= Dimonim Air =

Indonesian airline

IATA	ICAO	Call sign
—	—	—
- Founded: 2012
- Hubs: Sentani International Airport; Wamena Airport; Nabire Airport; Sultan Babullah Airport; Rahadi Osman Airport; Tanah Merah Airport
- Fleet size: 12
- Destinations: VIP Charters
- Parent company: PT Marta Buana Abadi
- Headquarters: Jakarta, Indonesia
- Key people: Capt. Vicoas T.B. Amalo (President Director); Capt. Wahudin Nugroho (VP)
- Website: Official website

Dimonim Air is a national airline in Indonesia, with services that are "chartered airlines." It has an air base at Sentani International Airport, and its head office is on Jl. Cidurian No.6 Cikini, Central Jakarta.

== History ==
The company began operating in 2008 using Korean Kamov Ka-32A helicopters.

== Destinations ==
Dimonim Air operates charter & freighter services with a focus on Indonesian destinations, providing transportation linkages in Indonesia. Scheduled destinations include:

Sumatra

- Batam - Hang Nadim Airport

Kalimantan

- Ketapang - Rahadi Osman Airport

Maluku

- Ternate - Sultan Babullah Airport

Papua

- Jayapura - Sentani International Airport
- Wamena - Wamena Airport
- Nabire - Nabire Airport
- Dekai - Nop Goliat Dekai Airport
- Elelim - Elelim Airport
- Karubaga - Karubaga Airport
- Sinak Sinak Airstrip
- Ilaga - Ilaga Airport
- Beoga - Beoga Airfield
- Mulia - Mulia-Puncak Jaya Airport
- Ilu - Ilu Airport
- Mamit - Mamit Landing Strip
- Bokondini - Bokondini Airport
- Kobakma - Kobakma Airport
- Pasema - Pasema Airport
- Anggruk - Anggruk Airport
- Faowi - Faowi Airport
- Kenyam - Kenyam Airport
- Paro - Paro Airfield

=== Future destinations ===
- Pangandaran - Cijulang Nusawiru Airport
- Palopo - Bua Airport
- Kepulauan Aru - Benjina Airport
- Rokan Hulu - Tuanku Tambusai Airport
- Mandailing Natal - Bukit Malintang Airport
- Muara Bungo - Muara Bungo Airport
- Samarinda - Aji Pangeran Tumenggung Pranoto International Airport
- Sabu Raijua - Tardamu Airport
- Maumere - Frans Seda Airport
- Sumbawa Besar - Sultan Muhammad Kaharuddin III Airport
- Gorontalo - Jalaluddin Airport
- Rengat - Japura Airport
- Jember - Notohadinegoro Airport
- Sumenep - Trunojoyo Airport

== Fleet ==
Dimonim Air has several aircraft, including:

Dimonim Air fleet
Aircraft	Total	Notes
Cessna 208B Grand Caravan EX	2	Passenger and Cargo
Cessna 208B Grand Caravan	3	Passenger and Cargo
DHC-6-300	2	Passenger and Cargo
PAC 750XL	1	Passenger and Cargo
Kamov Ka-32A	1	Cargo
Eurocopter AS350 B2	2	Passenger and Cargo
Eurocopter AS350 BA	1	Passenger and Cargo

== Accidents and incidents ==
- August 11, 2018 - A PAC 750XL aircraft of Dimonim Air registration PK-HVQ is reported missing on a flight between Tanah Merah Airport and Oksibil Airport, Papua, Indonesia. The flight should have a duration of 42 minutes but failed to arrive at Oksibil. Search operations are being conducted. Some people in a village reported they heard loud sounds and an explosion. There were two pilots and seven passengers aboard. The wreckage of the plane was located near Oksibil Airport. Eight occupants died in the crash, a boy was the only survivor.
