= Mopah Airport =

Airport in Merauke, Papua, Indonesia

Mopah Airport Bandar Udara Mopah
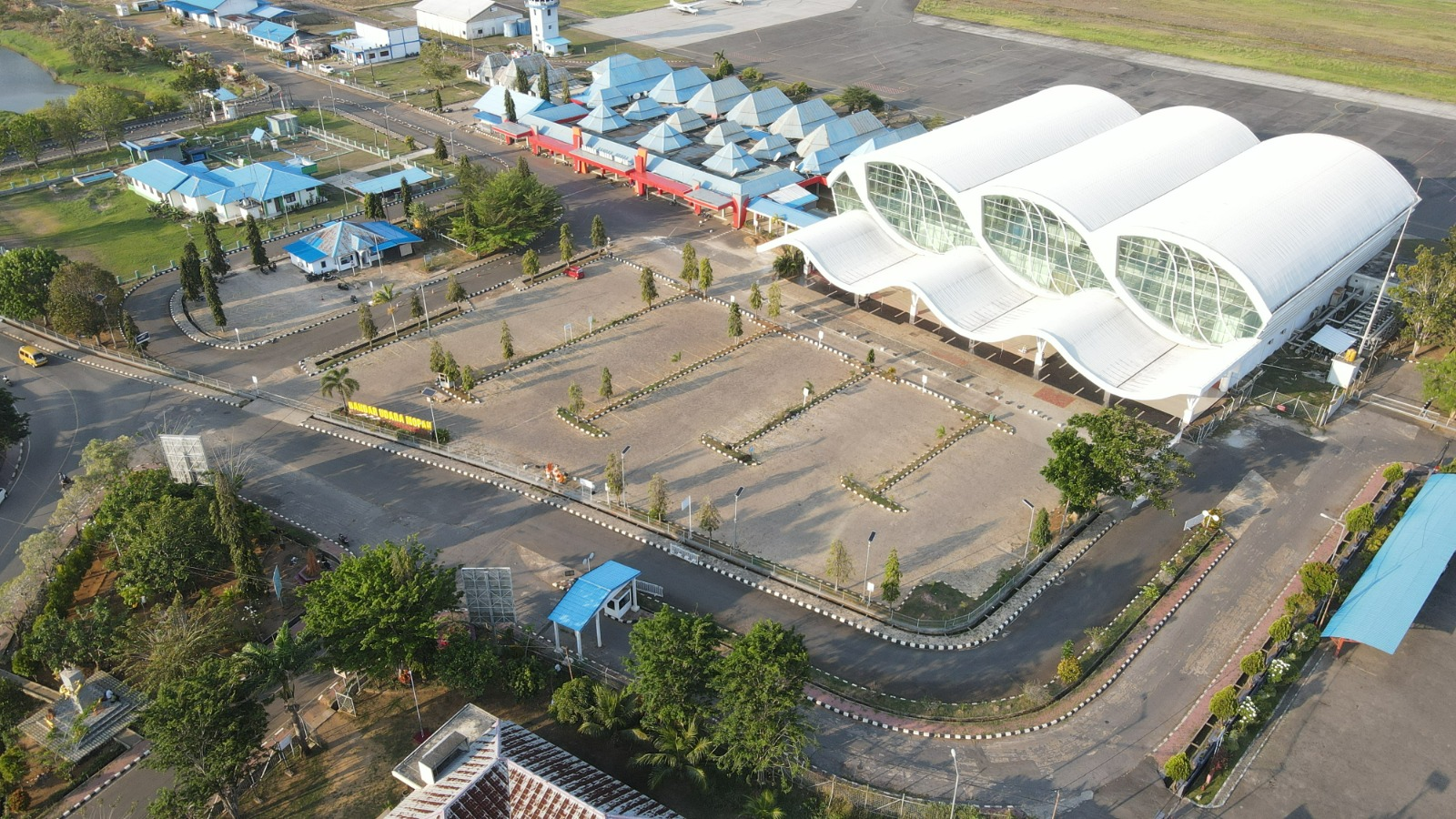
- IATA: MKQ; ICAO: WAKK; WMO: 97980

Summary
- Airport type: Public / Military
- Owner: Government of Indonesia
- Operator: Directorate General of Civil Aviation
- Serves: Merauke
- Location: Merauke, South Papua, Indonesia
- Opened: 28 June 1943; 83 years ago
- Time zone: WIT (UTC+09:00)
- Elevation AMSL: 10 ft (3.0 m)
- Coordinates: 08°31′13″S 140°25′06″E

Map
- Location in South Papua Location in Indonesia

Runways
Direction	Length		Surface
Direction	m	ft	Surface
16/34	2,500	8,202	Asphalt

Statistics (2024)
- Passengers: 351,714 (▲15.33%)
- Cargo (tonnes): 3,896.91 (▲38.64%)
- Aircraft movements: 8,835 (▲8.10%)
- Source: DGCA

Mopah Airport (IATA: MKQ, ICAO: WAKK) is a domestic airport located in Merauke, the largest town in South Papua province, Indonesia. It is the second easternmost airport in Indonesia after Sentani International Airport in Jayapura. Situated approximately 3 km (1.86 miles) from the town center, it is the largest and busiest airport in South Papua, serving as the primary gateway to Merauke and the province as a whole. The airport also provides access to nearby tourist destinations, most notably Wasur National Park. At present, scheduled services are limited to flights to Makassar and Jayapura, along with pioneer flights to smaller towns and villages in the interior of South Papua. Although the airport holds international status, it does not currently handle scheduled international flights, despite having previously served routes to Papua New Guinea.

In addition to serving civilian flights, the airport shares its facilities with Johannes Abraham Dimara Air Force Base, a Type-B installation of the Indonesian Air Force. The airbase is located southwest of the passenger terminal, across the runway.

== History ==
=== World War II ===
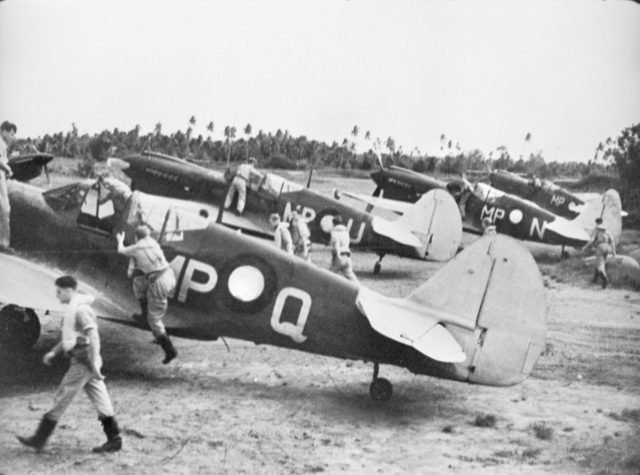
Members of No. 86 Squadron RAAF prepare to take off in their Curtiss P-40 Kittyhawk fighters from Merauke Airfield in 1944

In mid-1942, at the height of the Pacific War during World War II, Merauke, located on the southern coast of Dutch New Guinea, was among the few areas of the Dutch East Indies that remained unoccupied by Japanese forces, as the region's difficult terrain hindered further advances. The town was garrisoned by a company of infantry from the Royal Netherlands East Indies Army (KNIL), equipped with most of the force's available heavy weapons. Owing to its strategic position on the western flank of Allied operations in Papua, Allied commanders ordered the construction of an airfield at Merauke. On 6 August 1942, a company-sized detachment, Company F, of the United States Army's 46th Engineer Battalion arrived to commence construction.

Construction of the airstrip, measuring 150 by 6,000 feet (46 m × 1,829 m), commenced on 28 June 1943 by the Seabees of the 55th Naval Construction Battalion as part of Naval Base Merauke. Within eight days, it was able to accommodate its first aircraft. The strip was capable of supporting one squadron of fighter aircraft and several medium bombers. Approximately 20 miles of roads were constructed to connect the airstrip with the town, as well as with gasoline and fuel storage facilities. As Merauke lay within easy range of enemy air bases at the time, it was subjected to frequent strafing and bombing raids. On 11 May, just three days after their arrival, the Seabees experienced their first air raid. Although there were no casualties, some equipment was damaged or lost. Numerous alerts and attempted attacks followed, but no further bombing occurred until 9 September, by which time construction had been completed. Both the harbor and airfield were subsequently used extensively, with daily reconnaissance missions and bombing operations conducted from the strip. The airfield had a No. 86 Squadron RAAF and a few bombers assigned to do daily reconnaissance and bombing missions.

After the Surrender of Japan in 1945, Allied forces departed the airfield, and military control of the airport was handed over to the government of Dutch East Indies.

=== Contemporary history ===
Following the war, the airport was taken over and managed by the Netherlands Indies Civil Administration (NICA). After the Dutch East Indies gained independence as Indonesia in 1949, Dutch New Guinea remained under Dutch control as a separate colony, and the airport came under the administration of the colonial government. During this period, De Kroonduif, a subsidiary of the Dutch carrier KLM, operated flights from its hub in Biak to Merauke via Tanahmerah in Boven Digoel using Douglas C-47/DC-3 Dakota aircraft. Control of the airport was transferred to the Indonesian government in 1962, following the signing of the New York Agreement and the Dutch withdrawal from New Guinea.

In the 1990s, Papua New Guinea’s flag carrier, Air Niugini, operated direct international flights between Merauke and Daru Island; however, the service was discontinued seven years later due to the 1997 Asian financial crisis.

Due to the prolonged absence of international flights to the airport, its international status was revoked in May 2024. The status was later reinstated in August 2025.

== Facilities and development ==
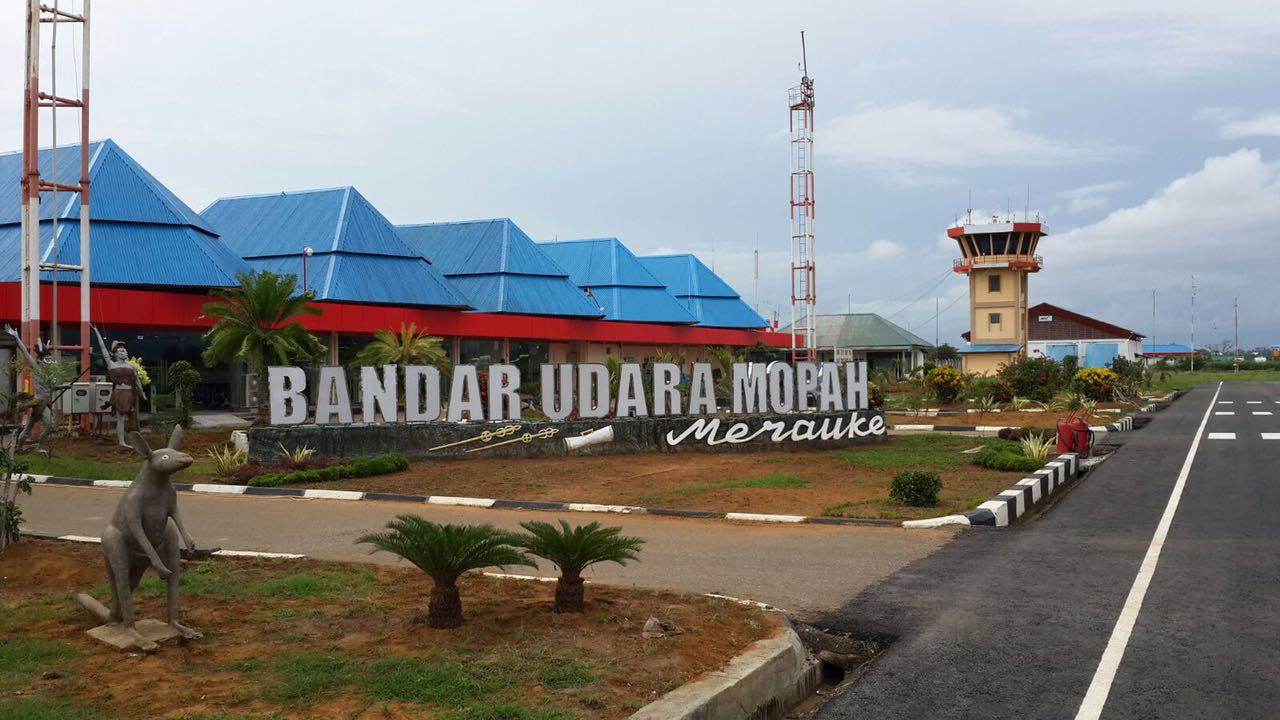
Mopah Airport after first phase renovation in 2016

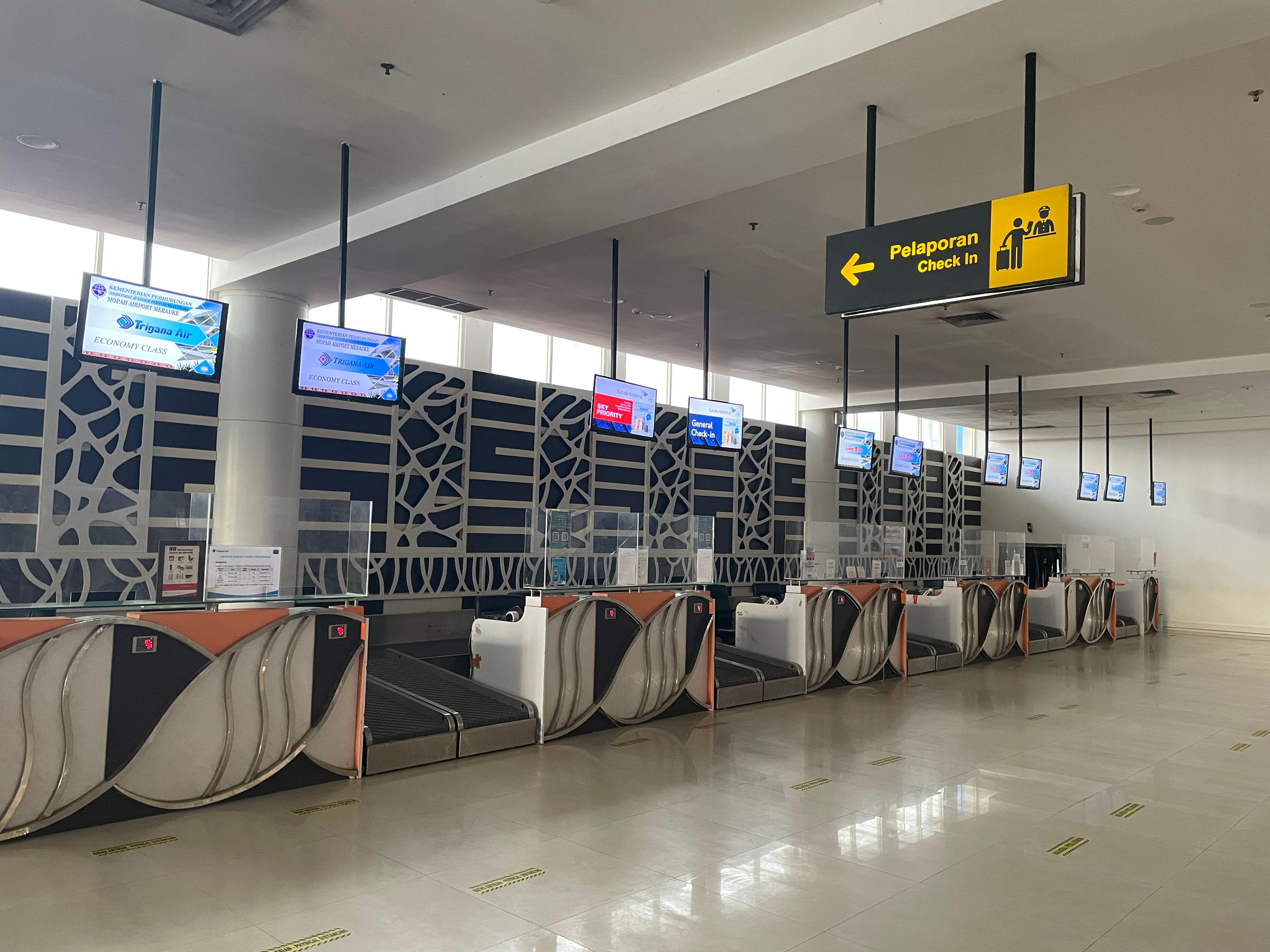
Check-in area

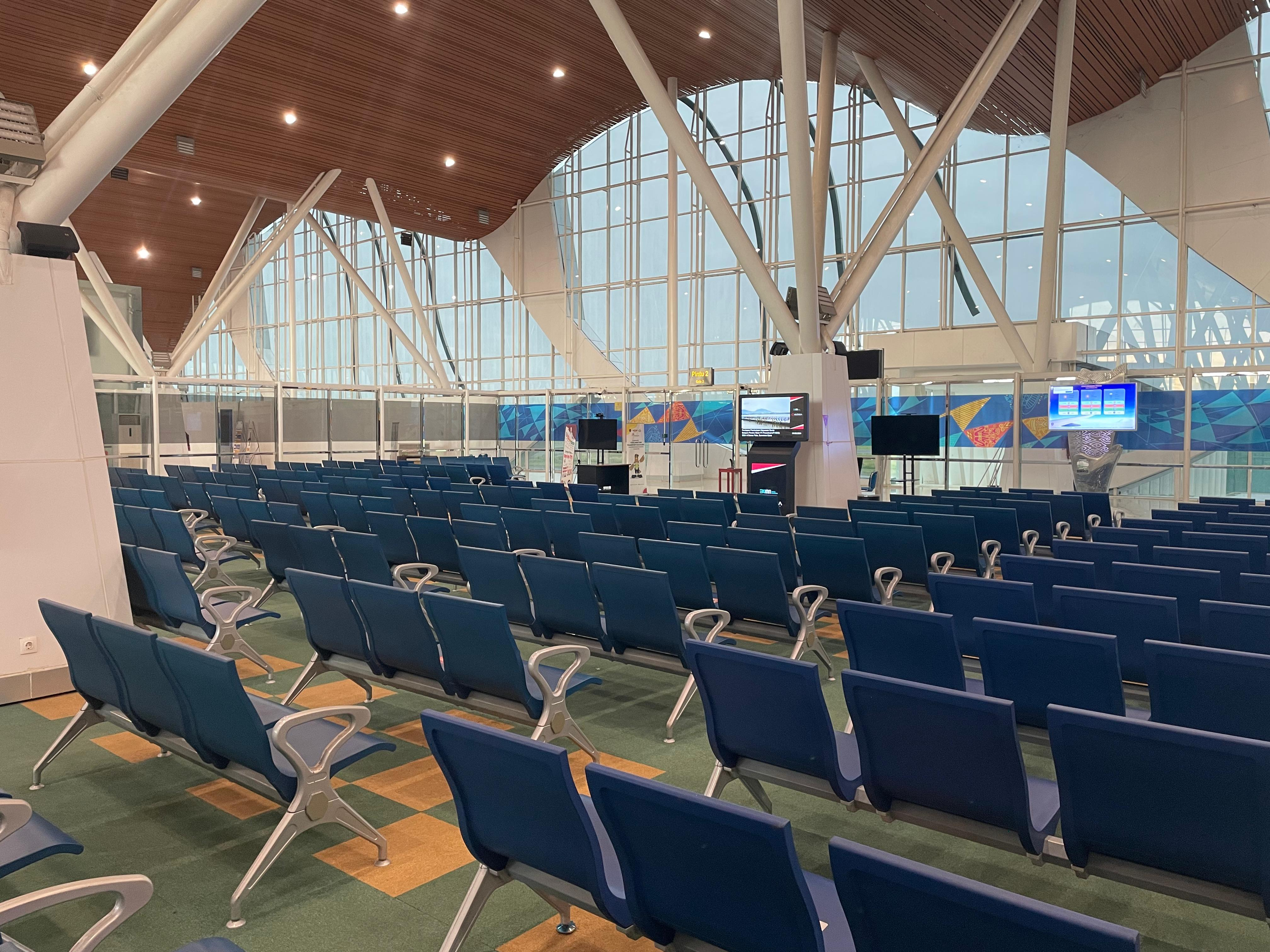
Boarding hall

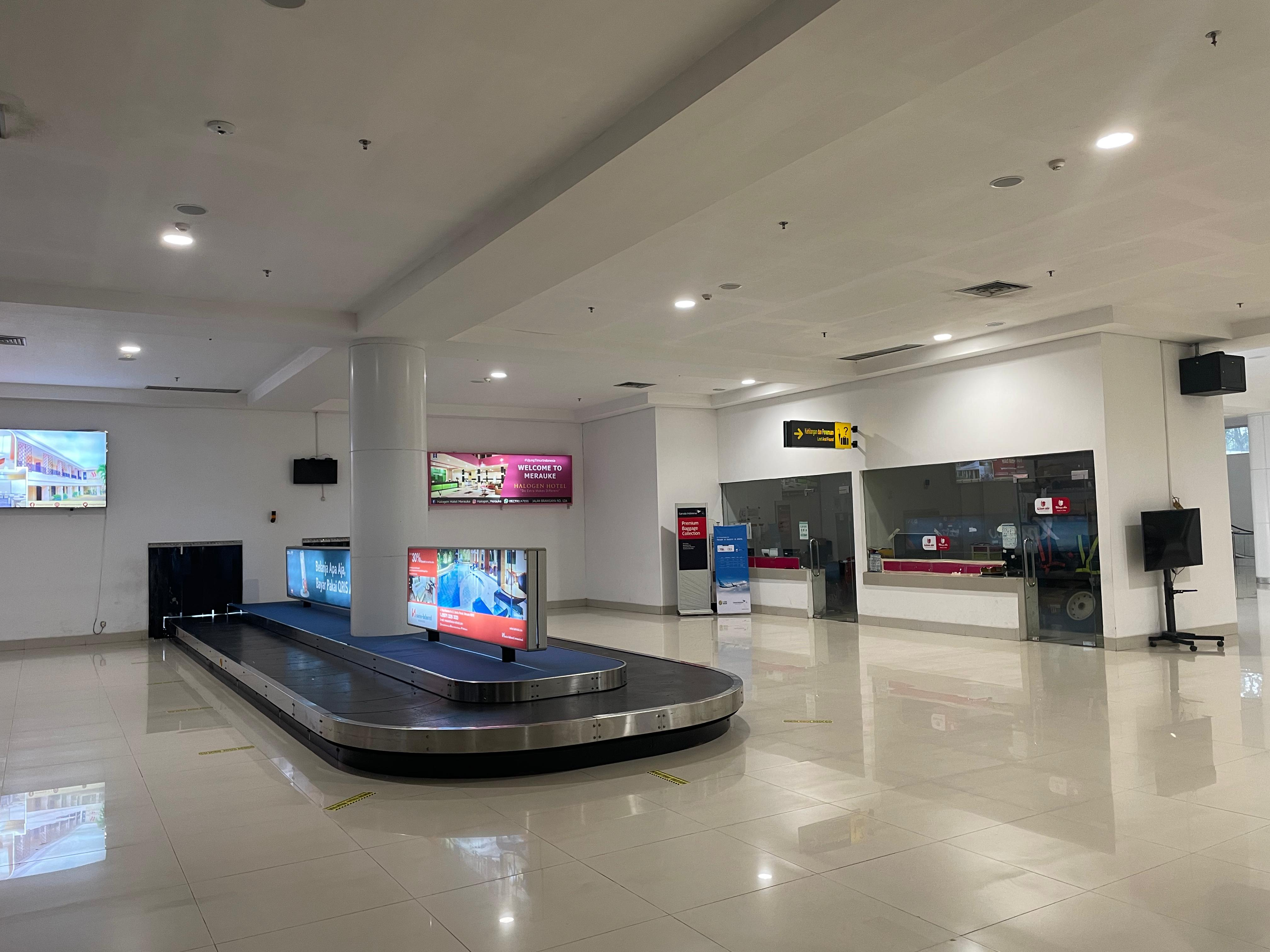
Baggage claim area

With the continued increase in tourist visits, the activity of airlines using the airport also increased. The terminal building was extensively renovated in 2015 to increase its capacity. The airport terminal was expanded from just 1,972 square metres (21,230 ft^{2}) to 4,634 square metres (49,880 ft^{2}). It can now carry around 200,000 passengers annually. The new check-in counter and baggage claim area has a more minimalist interior than the old one. The airport's parking lot was also expanded to cater more vehicles. The airport's toilet was also renovated extensively. The boarding lounge was also expanded and now contains 381 seats for passengers. Outside the terminal building, a canopy has now been installed at the drop off location so that passengers avoid the heat and rain when they arrive. In one corner of the terminal, an ATM and a food court were built. To add to the beauty and comfort for the passengers, the area around the terminal has been planted with trees and green grass. In total, the rehabilitation and expansion of the terminal building cost around Rp 16 billion (US $1,200,000).

Construction of a new terminal began in 2016 and is planned to be carried out in three phases. The first phase, completed in 2021, was inaugurated by then-President Joko Widodo on 3 October 2021. The project cost IDR 141 billion and was funded through the state budget (APBN). The passenger terminal at Mopah Airport currently covers an area of 7,200 square metres and has a capacity of up to 638,850 passengers annually. On the airside, the airport is currently equipped with a runway measuring 2,500 by 45 metres, capable of accommodating narrow-body jet aircraft such as the Boeing 737-900ER and Airbus A320.

== Airlines and destinations ==
=== Passenger ===
Airlines	Destinations
Garuda Indonesia	Jakarta–Soekarno-Hatta, (Note: Jakarta–Soekarno-Hatta is continuation of Jayapura flight with the same flight number.) Jayapura
Lion Air	Jakarta–Soekarno-Hatta, (Note: Jakarta–Soekarno-Hatta is continuation of Makassar flight with the same flight number.) Jayapura, Makassar
Trigana Air	Agats, Kepi, Oksibil, Tanahmerah

== Statistics ==
Annual passenger numbers and aircraft statistics
Year	Passengers handled	Passenger % change	Cargo (tonnes)	Cargo % change	Aircraft movements	Aircraft % change
2007	138,233	Steady	1,184.95	Steady	5,075	Steady
2008	136,181	▼1.48	958.00	▼19.15	4,714	▼7.11
2009	136,726	▲0.40	858.07	▼10.43	4,220	▼10.48
2010	144,887	▲5.97	849.04	▼1.05	4,807	▲13.91
2011	244,960	▲69.07	1,242.37	▲46.33	6,445	▲34.08
2012	271,031	▲10.64	1,854.42	▲49.26	5,617	▼12.85
2013	264,169	▼2.53	1,985.25	▲7.06	4,852	▼13.62
2014	306,513	▲16.03	2,162.98	▲8.95	6,584	▲35.70
2015	333,136	▲8.69	2,546.68	▲17.74	7,463	▲13.35
2016	365,256	▲9.64	3,179.78	▲24.86	7,028	▼5.83
2017	412,613	▲12.97	3,497.42	▲9.99	7,760	▲10.42
2018	443,433	▲7.47	3,351.21	▼4.18	8,359	▲7.72
2019	335,836	▼24.26	2,170.42	▼35.23	6,604	▼21.00
2020	156,755	▼53.32	1,138.63	▼47.54	3,956	▼40.10
2021	214,512	▲36.85	2,573.41	▲126.01	6,383	▲61.35
2022	262,065	▲22.17	2,764.18	▲7.41	6,901	▲8.12
2023	304,964	▲16.37	2,810.85	▲1.69	8,173	▲18.43
2024	351,714	▲15.33	3,896.91	▲38.64	8,835	▲8.10
^{Source: DGCA, BPS}

== Accidents and incidents ==
- On 26 January 2023, Lion Air Flight 797 was damaged when the right wing hit a jet bridge when the aircraft is taxiing to the runway for takeoff. The police stated that the pilot likely couldn't see the jet bridge because of the size of the aircraft.
