= WAJB =

WAJB may refer to:

- WAJB-LP, a low-power radio station formerly licensed to Wellston, Ohio.
- the ICAO code for Bokondini Airport, Indonesia
