= Jayawijaya Dirgantara =

Indonesian cargo airline

IATA	ICAO	Call sign
-	JWD	-
- Founded: 2012; 14 years ago
- Hubs: Sentani International Airport; Wamena Airport
- Fleet size: 3
- Headquarters: Jakarta, Indonesia
- Website: ptjayawijayadirgantara.co

Jayawijaya Dirgantara is an airline based in Jakarta, Indonesia. It operates domestic and regional cargo flights in the territory of the province of Papua. Its main base is at Halim Perdanakusuma Airport.

== History ==
Jayawijaya Dirgantara established in 2012, and began operations in 2013 and based in Jakarta. Initially the airline was only a Boeing 737-200 aircraft with PK-JRB registration. This airline serves the transportation of goods and cargo from Jayapura to Wamena, Papua, Indonesia.

On 18 August 2018, Garuda Indonesia signed an MoU agreement with this airline relating to the distribution of cargo from Jayapura to Wamena.

== Destinations ==
Jayawijaya Dirgantara operates freighter services with a focus on East Indonesia destinations, providing transportation linkages in East Indonesia. Scheduled destinations include:

Indonesia

- Jayapura - Sentani International Airport (DJJ)
- Wamena - Wamena Airport (WMX)

== Fleet ==
=== Current fleet ===
As of July 2026, Jayawijaya Dirgantara operates the following aircraft:

Jayawijaya Dirgantara fleet
Aircraft	In fleet	Orders	Notes
Boeing 737-200C	2	—	
Boeing 737-300SF	1	—	
Total	3	—	

=== Former fleet ===
As of August 2025, Jayawijaya Dirgantara operated 2 Boeing 737-200C and 1 Boeing 737-300SSF.

== Accidents and incidents ==
- May 25, 2018 - A Boeing 737-200 cargo aircraft operated by Jayawijaya Dirgantara Air with PK-JRM registration, carrying rice and cement, slipped while landing on runway 15 at Wamena Airport, Papua, Indonesia. Part of engine number 2 broke onto the runway. There were no fatalities. The aircraft removed from the airline's fleet.
