= Wamena Airport =

Indonesian Airport

Wamena Airport Bandar Udara Wamena
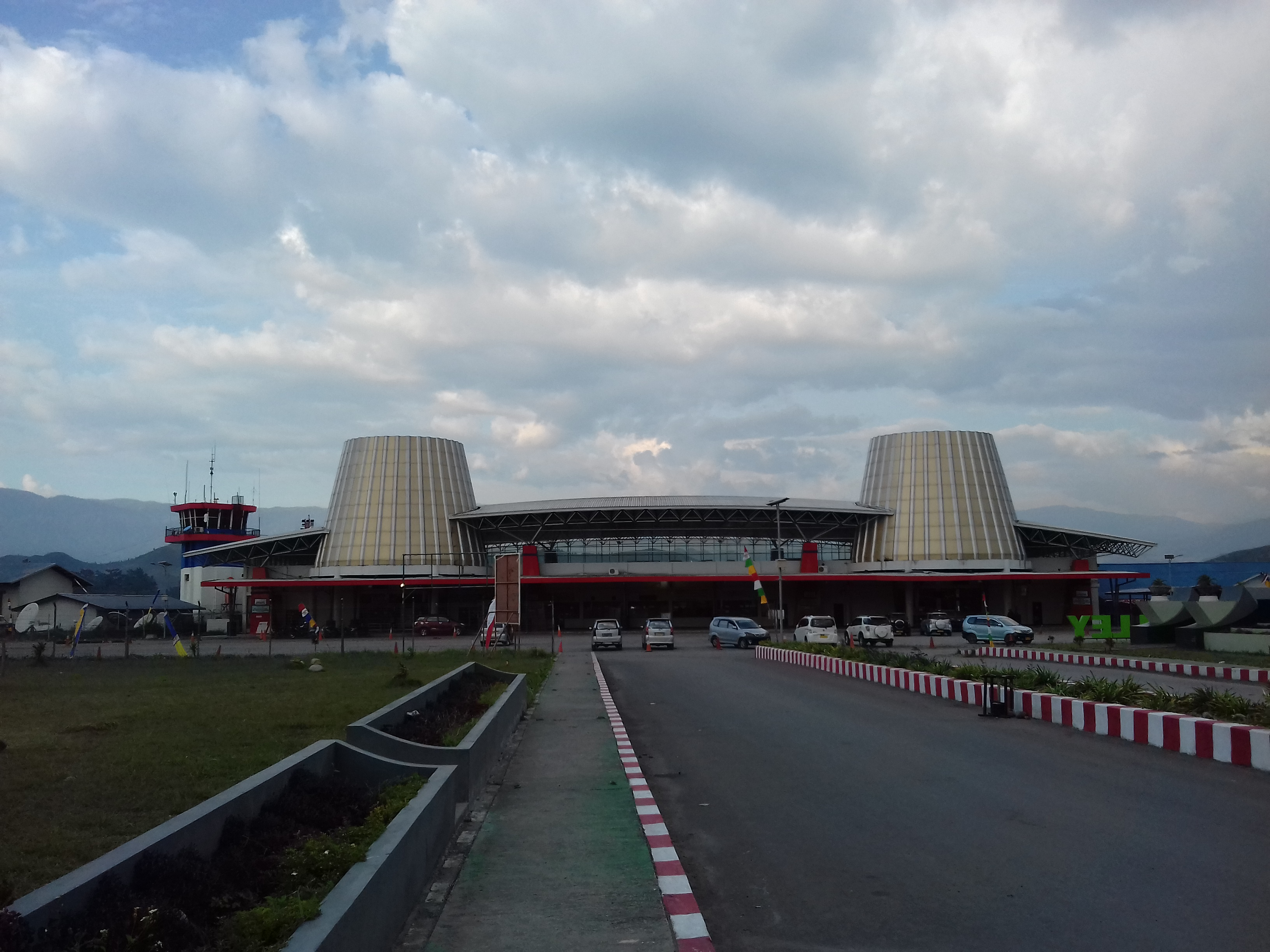
- IATA: WMX; ICAO: WAVV

Summary
- Airport type: Public
- Owner: Government of Indonesia
- Operator: Directorate General of Civil Aviation
- Serves: Wamena, Tolikara, Yahukimo, Yalimo
- Location: Wamena, Jayawijaya Regency, Highland Papua, Indonesia
- Operating base for: Susi Air
- Time zone: WIT (UTC+09:00)
- Elevation AMSL: 5,435 ft (1,657 m)
- Coordinates: 4°05′54″S 138°57′05.98″E

Map
- Location in Highland Papua Location in Western New Guinea Location in Indonesia

Runways
Direction	Length		Surface
Direction	ft	m	Surface
15/33	7,136	2,435	Asphalt

Statistics (2024)
- Passengers: 342,927 (▲16.71%)
- Cargo (tonnes): 123,094.18 (▲1.24%)
- Aircraft movements: 31,705 (▲11.81%)
- Source: DGCA

Wamena Airport (IATA: WMX, ICAO: WAVV) is a domestic airport serving the town of Wamena in Jayawijaya Regency, Highland Papua, Indonesia. The airport is located about 1 km (0.62 miles) from Wamena’s town center. The airport is the largest and busiest in the Papuan highlands and serves as the primary gateway for both passenger and cargo traffic to the region, particularly Jayawijaya Regency, as well as the neighboring regencies of Lanny Jaya and Tolikara. It also serves as the main point of entry to the Baliem Valley, where the annual Baliem Valley Festival is held. It is currently the only airport in the highlands capable of accommodating narrow-body aircraft such as the Airbus A320, Boeing 737, and C-130 Hercules, and functions as the primary aviation hub for the region. At present, the airport handles scheduled flights to cities such as Jayapura and Timika, in addition to pioneer routes serving remote areas across the highland.

== History ==
=== Colonial era ===
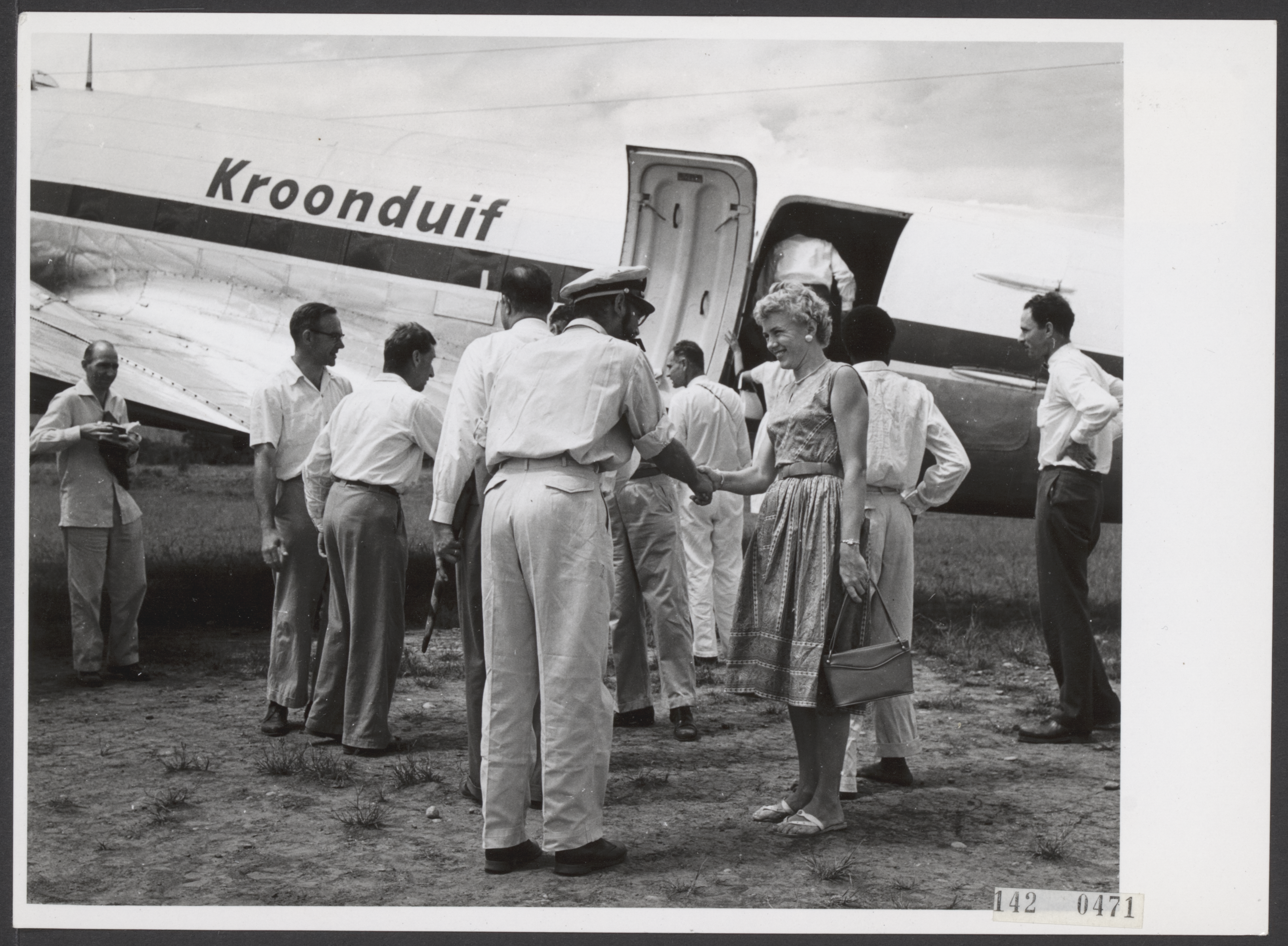
A De Kroonduif Douglas DC-3 aircraft at Wamena Airstrip, 1959.

On 20 April 1954, a group of missionaries from the United States arrived in the Baliem Valley, which was then part of Netherlands New Guinea. The missionary team traveled by light aircraft, landing on the Baliem River, specifically in Minimo village, with the primary mission of introducing Christianity to the Dani people of the Baliem Valley. The first missionary station was subsequently established in Hitigima. Over the following seven months, they constructed the first airstrip in the area. Some time later, the missionaries identified a more suitable site for an airfield. This site, located near the territory of the Mukoko people, became the location where a new airstrip was developed, which would later evolve into present-day Wamena Airport. The early airstrip was built by missionaries and local residents using basic tools and had minimal infrastructure, with a simple grass or compacted earth runway and no fencing.

In 1958, the Dutch colonial administration formally established its presence in the Baliem Valley, constructing a government post in the vicinity of the airstrip. In 1960, the Dutch authorities established regular air services to Wamena in response to the increasing number of tourists visiting the Baliem Valley. By 1961, De Kroonduif, a subsidiary of KLM operating in Netherlands New Guinea, operated four weekly flights between Hollandia (now Jayapura) and Wamena using Douglas DC-3 Dakota aircraft. Following the New York Agreement in 1963, the Dutch withdrew from New Guinea, and control of the airfield was transferred to the Indonesian government. The Jayapura–Wamena route was subsequently taken over by the Indonesian state-owned airline Merpati Nusantara Airlines.

=== Contemporary history ===
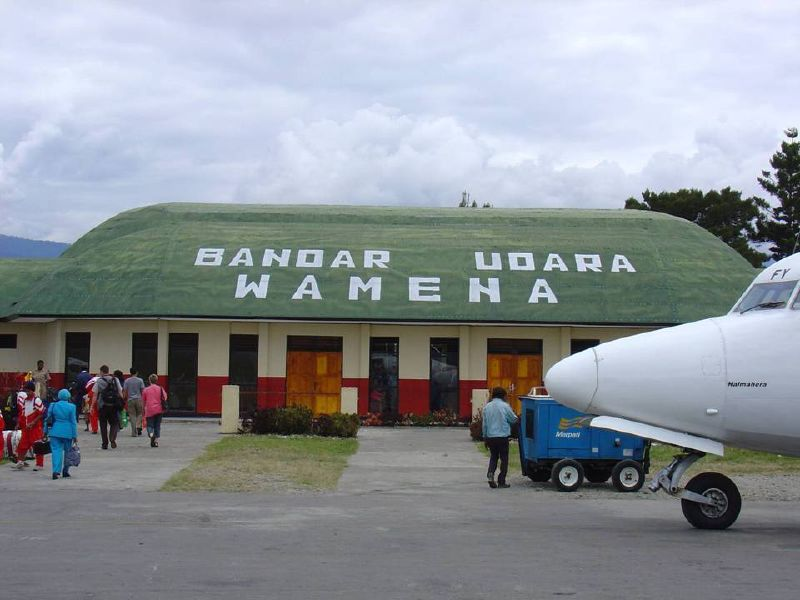
Wamena Airport terminal in 2006, before it was destroyed by fire in 2011

Following the Indonesian annexation of Western New Guinea, President Suharto ordered the upgrade of Wamena Airport to accommodate larger aircraft such as the C-130 Hercules as part of broader efforts to develop West Irian. The project, supported by the Indonesian Navy, Air Force, and the Army Corps of Engineers under Kodam XVII/Cenderawasih, aimed to improve regional connectivity and support economic activities, particularly the distribution of agricultural products from the Baliem Valley. The runway was extended from 1,400 meters to 1,900 meters, with completion originally planned for June 1971, but, the first C-130 Hercules successfully landed on 22 August 1970.

On 2 April 1977, management of the airport was transferred from the Ministry of Home Affairs to the Ministry of Transportation. At that time, Wamena Airport was already capable of accommodating aircraft such as the Fokker F27.

On 1 August 2000, approximately 100 members of the Papua Task Force (PTF), a pro-independence civilian militia, seized control of Wamena Airport after rumors circulated that refugees fleeing violence in the Maluku Islands would arrive there. Armed with bows, arrows, and clubs, they forced their way past security, set up their own guards, and took control of key areas of the airport. During the takeover, PTF members searched passengers and ransacked luggage, particularly those bound for Jayapura, while also preventing some travelers from departing. The disruption lasted several days until police forces regained control of the airport on 5 August 2000.

In the early morning of 26 September 2011, the terminal at Wamena Airport was destroyed by fire, which was suspected to have been caused by a short circuit. There were no casualties in the incident. The fire destroyed the terminal facilities, including the airport medical room, baggage area, and ticket counters. The losses were estimated at up to nine billion rupiah.

== Facilities and development ==
=== Facilities ===
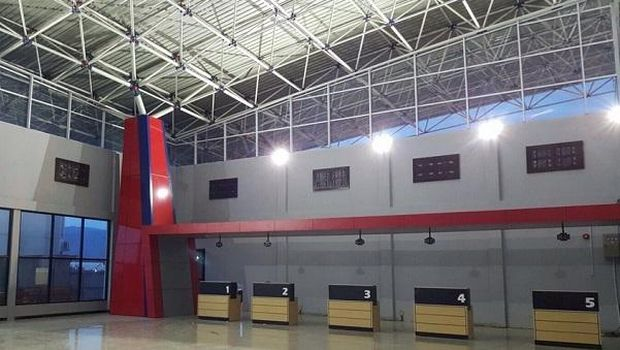
Check-in area

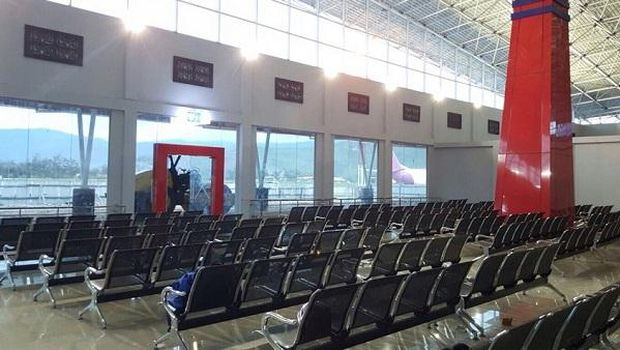
Boarding hall

To replace the terminal that was destroyed by fire in 2011, the government began airport terminal in 2014, funded through the 2014 State Budget (DIPA) for Phase I of the terminal building. Construction continued in 2015 with Phase II, with a total budget of IDR 54.03 billion. The airport upgrade and development were completed and formally inaugurated by then-President Joko Widodo on 30 December 2015.

The development included a new passenger terminal with a total area of 4,000 m² (43,056 sq ft), significantly larger than the previous 965 m² (10,387 sq ft) terminal. Designed in a local architectural style inspired by the traditional honai house, the new terminal has a departure capacity of up to 228 passengers per hour. The facilities include five check-in counters, passenger seating in the boarding area, air-conditioned rooms, and restrooms. Other facilities include baggage carousels, an ATM center, a food court, a canteen, prayer rooms, and a vehicle parking area. In addition to the passenger terminal, the airport is equipped with a cargo terminal measuring 360 m² (3,875 sq ft), an administrative building measuring 420 m² (4,521 sq ft), an AirNav Indonesia office building measuring 100 m² (1,076 sq ft), a powerhouse building measuring 336 m² (3,617 sq ft), and a aircraft rescue and firefighting (PKP-PK) building measuring 300 m² (3,229 sq ft). The airport is also enclosed by a perimeter fence measuring 2,638 m² (28,395 sq ft).

On the airside, the airport's runway was extended to 2,175 m × 30 m (7,136 ft × 98 ft) in 2015, enabling it to accommodate narrow-body aircraft such as the Boeing 737-300. In 2019, the runway was further extended from 2,175 m × 30 m (7,136 ft × 98 ft) to 2,275 m × 30 m (7,464 ft × 98 ft). In 2024, it was extended and widened to 2,435 m × 45 m (7,989 ft × 148 ft), allowing the airport to accommodate larger narrow-body aircraft such as the Airbus A320 and Boeing 737-800. In addition to the runway, Wamena Airport has two aircraft aprons measuring 180 m × 45 m (591 ft × 148 ft) and 356 m × 45 m (1,168 ft × 148 ft), respectively, as well as five taxiways measuring 55 m × 15 m (180 ft × 49 ft), 53 m × 15.5 m (174 ft × 51 ft), 54 m × 13 m (177 ft × 43 ft), 66.5 m × 24 m (218 ft × 79 ft), and 71 m × 29 m (233 ft × 95 ft).

=== Development ===
In the future, the runway is planned to be extended to 2,800 m (9,186 ft), with an additional 60 m (197 ft) stopway and a 150 m (492 ft) runway end safety area (RESA) at each end. A new 800 m parallel taxiway is also planned for construction.

== Airlines and destinations ==
=== Passenger ===
Airlines	Destinations
Sriwijaya Air	Jayapura
Susi Air	Anggruk, Balinggama, Bikgunulingge, Denema, Enggolok, Gingginem, Holuwon, Ilaga, Illu, Kenyam, Koropun, Kweapbel, Mulia, Nalca, Oksibil, Owitlep, Pasema, Silimo
Trigana Air	Jayapura, Timika
Wings Air	Jayapura

=== Cargo ===
Airlines	Destinations
Cardig Air	Jayapura
Jayawijaya Dirgantara	Jayapura, Timika
My Indo Airlines	Jayapura
Tri-MG Intra Asia Airlines	Timika

== Statistics ==
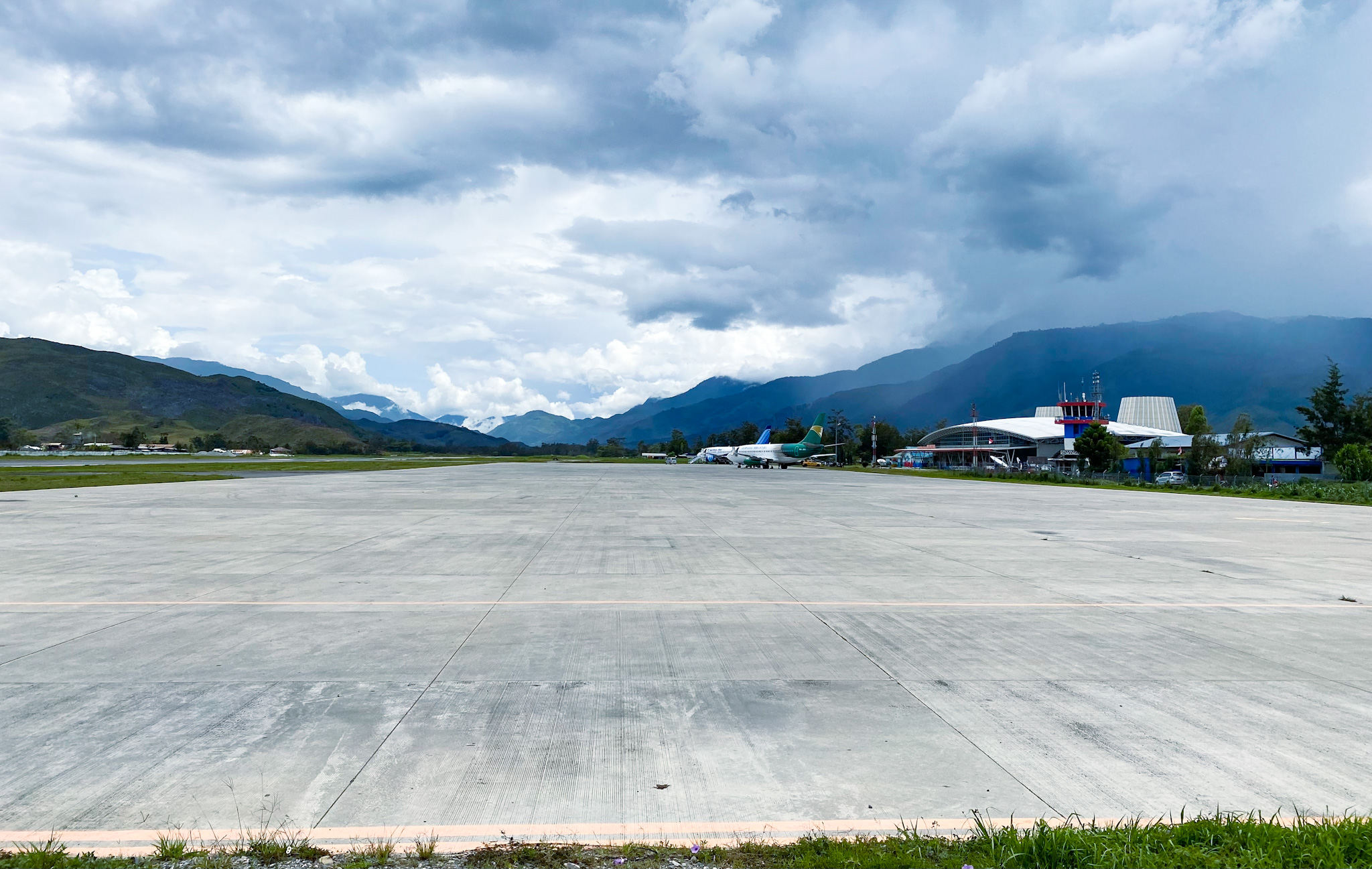
Apron view of Wamena Airport

Annual passenger numbers and aircraft statistics
Year	Passengers handled	Passenger % change	Cargo (tonnes)	Cargo % change	Aircraft movements	Aircraft % change
2006	76,802	Steady	9,058.30	Steady	20,898	Steady
2007	122,456	▲59.44	34,980.03	▲286.17	22,823	▲9.21
2008	217,664	▲77.75	41,947.83	▲19.92	23,476	▲2.86
2009	191,124	▼12.19	35,310.15	▼15.82	26,822	▲14.25
2010	201,710	▲5.54	66,597.74	▲88.61	29,368	▲9.49
2011	254,286	▲26.07	94,817.98	▲42.37	34,472	▲17.38
2012	225,295	▼11.40	12,574.88	▼86.74	34,189	▼0.82
2013	227,957	▲1.18	83,916.84	▲567.34	33,354	▼2.44
2014	280,533	▲23.06	17,958.97	▼78.60	39,361	▲18.01
2015	312,356	▲11.34	122,365.78	▲581.36	39,400	▲0.10
2016	375,663	▲20.27	54,864.04	▼55.16	44,253	▲12.32
2017	399,383	▲6.31	142,367.78	▲159.49	39,963	▼9.69
2018	364,638	▼8.70	93,388.15	▼34.40	38,374	▼3.98
2019	337,564	▼7.42	132,617.46	▲42.01	37,107	▼3.30
2020	136,257	▼59.64	124,341.21	▼6.24	27,976	▼24.61
2021	132,618	▼2.67	118,459.68	▼4.73	26,491	▼5.31
2022	199,813	▲50.67	87,614.58	▼26.04	20,666	▼21.99
2023	293,829	▲47.05	121,591.81	▲38.78	28,356	▲37.21
2024	342,927	▲16.71	123,094.18	▲1.24	31,705	▲11.81
^{Source: DGCA, BPS}

== Accidents and incidents ==
- On 14 May 1963, a Garuda Indonesian Airways Scottish Aviation Twin Pioneer 3, with the registration PK-GTC crashed during takeoff. There were no fatalities.
- On 15 August 1984, an Airfast Indonesia Douglas C-47A PK-OBC crashed into a mountain near Wamena. Two of the three people on board were killed.
- On 21 April 2002, an Antonov An-72 (ES-NOP) of Estonian airline Enimex was damaged in a hard landing at Wamena Airport; a minor fire broke out. Due to the dead battery of the fire truck some firefighters ran to the accident scene with hand-held fire extinguishers. After some 20 minutes the truck's battery was charged, but the aircraft had to be written off. There were no fatalities.
- On 9 April 2009, an Aviastar BAe 146-300 PK-BRD, flew into a mountain near Wamena, after a failed second approach for landing at Wamena Airport. All six occupants died,
- On 26 September 2011, the airport was razed by fire; all buildings including the departure and arrival terminals were engulfed by fire.
- On 18 December 2016, an Indonesian Air Force C-130H Hercules flew into hills 1700 m southeast of the runway threshold while attempting to land in poor visibility, killing all 13 people on board.
- On 18 July 2017, a Boeing 737-300F (Freighter) (PK-YGG) of Indonesian airline Tri-MG Intra Asia Airlines sustained substantial damage after a hard landing and subsequent runway excursion. The aircraft came to a stop on rough terrain. No injuries were reported.
