= 1996 Timika shooting =

Mass shooting in Indonesia

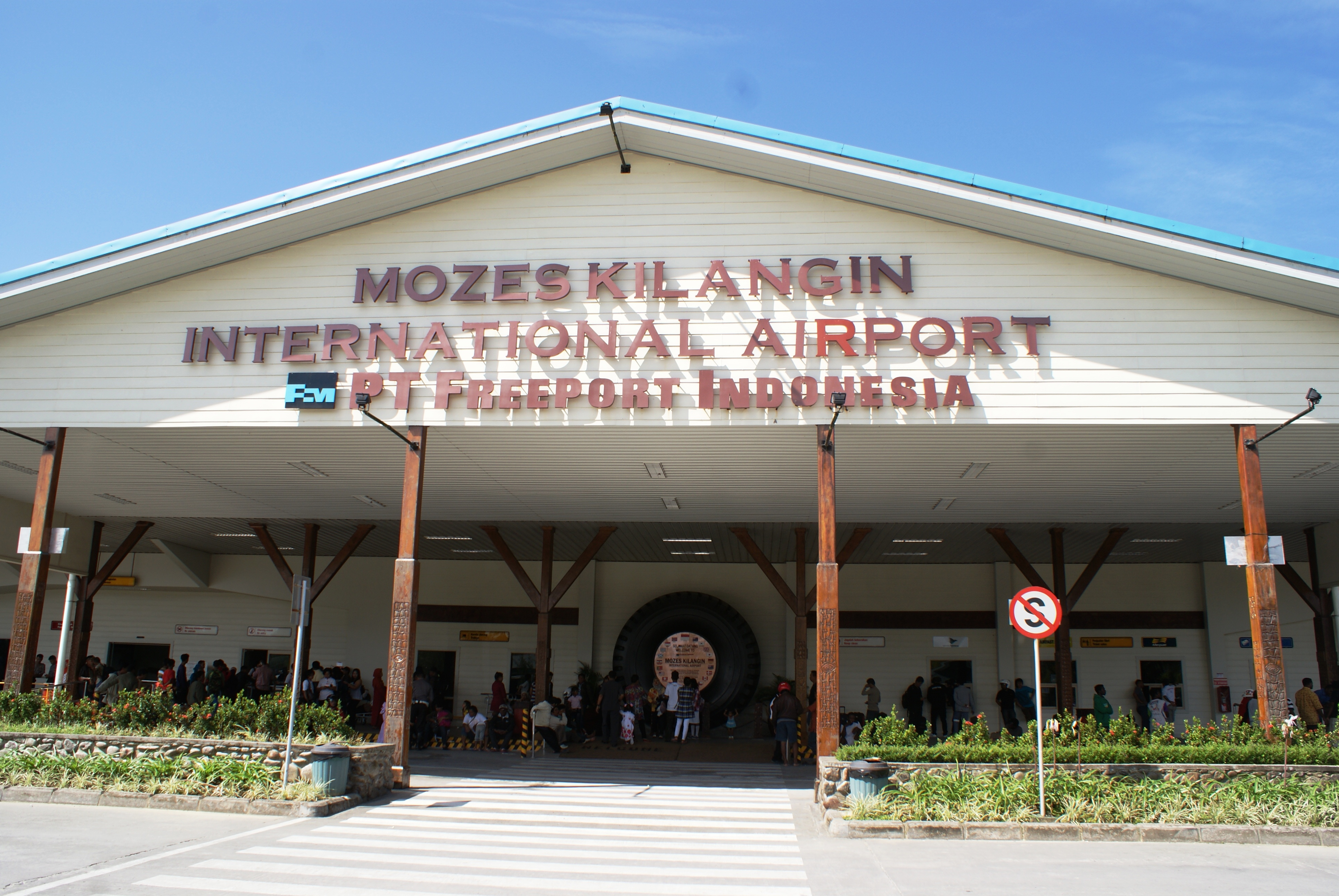
- Entrance to the airport in 2011

- Mozes Kilangin Airport (Western New Guinea)
- Location: Mozes Kilangin Airport, Timika, Irian Jaya, Indonesia
- Date: 15 April 1996; 7:00 a.m. – 9:00 a.m. (WIT)
- Target: People in the Mozes Kilangin Airport
- Attack type: Mass shooting, workplace shooting
- Weapon: Assault rifle (Pindad SS1?)
- Deaths: 16
- Injuries: 12 (including the perpetrator)
- Perpetrator: Second Lieutenant Sanurip
- Motive: Unclear, possibly: Severe depression and neurological disorder; Bereavement after a friend's death; Disillusion over not being deployed

The 1996 Timika shooting (Indonesian: Insiden Penembakan Timika 1996) was a mass shooting that took place on 15 April 1996 at the Mozes Kilangin Airport, Timika, Irian Jaya (now Central Papua), Indonesia, by a 36-year-old member of Kopassus Sec. Lt. Sanurip. Sixteen people were killed and eleven others were injured.

== Chronology ==
According to military spokesmen, Sanurip was reprimanded by another officer for being noisy and causing a scene when he awoke in a hangar that was used by the military as a commando post since the riots in Timika had erupted. Right after this Sanurip began firing with his assault rifle at about 7 a.m. He first shot five other military personnel, including Lieutenant Colonel Adel Gustinigo, commander of Detachment 81, the counter-terrorist arm of the Indonesian army's elite special forces, as well as a major and captain, and then shot indiscriminately at anyone, while running out of the hangar.

Within seconds he killed 16 people – five Kopassus officers, six ABRI soldiers and five civilians, one of them New Zealander Michael Findlay, a helicopter pilot working for Airfast – and injuring another 13 people, ten ABRI officers and three civilians. Sanurip was ultimately subdued by other soldiers after being shot in the leg.

The shooting lasted about 2 hours. It is believed that he fired 52 shots in total during his attack on the Airport.

== Motive ==
The motive behind the rampage was not immediately known, though it was suggested that Sanurip was suffering from depression and was not in a healthy state, perhaps due to a malaria infection.

It was further reported that an army transporter, carrying two soldiers killed in Mapenduma, made a fuel stop at Timika airport that morning, and that Sanurip began shooting after seeing their remains and realising that one of them was a friend of his, though it was stated by military spokesmen this information was not true and that there was no connection between the arrival of the bodies and the mass murder.

Also repudiated were initial reports that there was a heated argument between Sanurip and his superiors prior to the shooting.

== Victims ==
Among those who were killed:

- Lieutenant Colonel Adel Gustimigo, 37, Detachment 81/Kopassus
- Major Gunawan, Detachment 81/Kopassus
- Captain Djatmiko, 328th Airborne Infantry/Kostrad
- Sergeant Major Yaswanto, Kopassus
- First Sergeant Manasye, Komando Rayon Militer
- Sergeant 2nd class Joko, 752nd Battalion/Kodam VIII/Trikora
- Private Kasiyanto, 752nd Battalion/Kodam VIII/Trikora
- Private Misdiyono, 752nd Battalion/Kodam VIII/Trikora
- Private Mochtar, 752nd Battalion/Kodam VIII/Trikora
- Private Rudy, 752nd Battalion/Kodam VIII/Trikora
- Private Triyono, 752nd Battalion/Kodam VIII/Trikora
- Antonio Budi Afianto, Airfast technician
- Darmanto
- Michael Findlay, Airfast pilot
- Jimmy Watusile
- Unnamed civilian

Among those wounded was Airfast employee Sarjito.

Two Kopassus and one Kostrad treated in Gatot Subroto Civilian in Pondok Indah Four in Jakarta.

== Aftermath ==
A military tribunal rejected the defence that Second Lieutenant Sanurip was suffering from malaria-induced depression. Sanurip was sentenced to death by a military tribunal in Jayapura on 23 April 1997. After the decision was made public, Amnesty International uttered concerns, because the court had rejected evidence regarding Sanurip's mental health.

The Military High Court in Surabaya dismissed his appeal on 18 June 1997, and also discharged him from the Indonesian Armed Forces and ordered him to pay a nominal court fee, whereupon he lodged an appeal to the Indonesian Supreme Court. He later died in a hospital or comitted suicide in his jail cell.

The shooting is one of the deadliest workplace shootings in modern history.

== See also ==
- Papua conflict
- Fort Lauderdale airport shooting
