= My Indo Airlines =

Cargo airline of Indonesia

MY Indo Airlines
IATA	ICAO	Call sign
3Y	MYU	MYINDO
- Commenced operations: August 2014; 12 years ago
- Hubs: Soekarno–Hatta International Airport
- Fleet size: 10
- Destinations: 7
- Headquarters: Jakarta, Indonesia
- Key people: Mohammed Yunos Ishak (CEO)
- Website: www.myindoairlines.com

My Indo Airlines is an Indonesian cargo and passenger airline based in Soekarno–Hatta International Airport near Jakarta. It is a scheduled and charter cargo airlines which focuses on the domestic and international cargo sector.

Established in 2014, the airline's inaugural route connecting Jakarta, Indonesia and Singapore. Due to the safety issues of Indonesia's aviation industry, My Indo Airlines is one of 59 airlines banned from operating in European airspace.

During the COVID-19 pandemic, the airline operate some flights to Bangkok, Thailand.

== Destinations ==
- China
  - Shenzhen – Shenzhen Bao'an International Airport
  - Haikou – Haikou Meilan International Airport
- India
  - Kolkata – Netaji Subhas Chandra Bose International Airport
- Sri Lanka
  - Colombo – Bandaranaike International Airport
- Indonesia
  - Balikpapan – Sultan Aji Muhammad Sulaiman Sepinggan Airport
  - Jakarta – Soekarno–Hatta International Airport (Hub)
  - Semarang – Jenderal Ahmad Yani International Airport
  - Jayapura – Sentani International Airport
  - Wamena – Wamena Airport
- Philippines
  - Manila – Ninoy Aquino International Airport
- Singapore
  - Changi Airport
- Thailand
  - Bangkok – Suvarnabhumi Airport
- Australia
  - Cairns – Cairns Airport
- Cambodia
  - Siemreap – Siem Reap–Angkor International Airport

== Fleet ==
=== Current fleet ===
As of July 2026, My Indo Airlines operates the following aircraft:

My Indo Airlines fleet
Aircraft	In Fleet	Orders	Notes
Boeing 737-300SF	5	-	
Boeing 737-400F	4	-	
Boeing 737-800BCF	1	-	First 737-800BCF Operator in Indonesia
Total	10		

=== Former fleet ===
As of August 2025, My Indo Airlines operated 4 Boeing 737-300SF, 3 Boeing 737-400F and 1 Boeing 737-800BCF.
