= Mozes Kilangin Airport =

Airport in Timika, Central Papua, Indonesia

Mozes Kilangin Airport Bandar Udara Mozes Kilangin
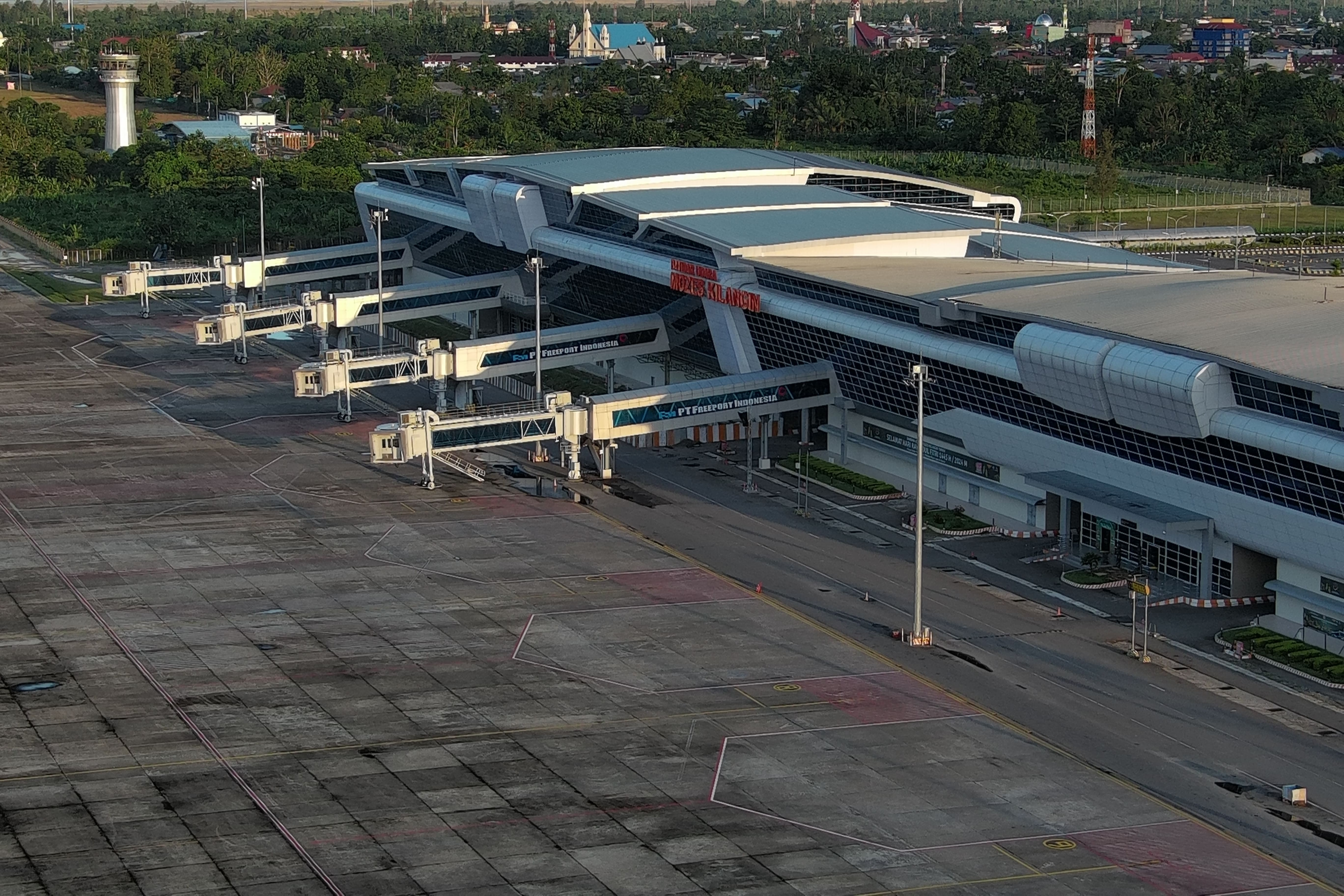
- IATA: TIM; ICAO: WAYY (formerly WABP)

Summary
- Airport type: Public / Military
- Owner: Government of Indonesia; Freeport Indonesia
- Operator: Directorate General of Civil Aviation; Freeport Indonesia
- Serves: Timika
- Location: Timika, Mimika Regency, Central Papua, Indonesia
- Operating base for: Airfast Indonesia; Asian One Air
- Time zone: WIT (UTC+09:00)
- Elevation AMSL: 90.3 ft (27.5 m)
- Coordinates: 04°31′44.76″S 136°53′11.76″E

Map
- Location in Papua Location in Indonesia

Runways
Direction	Length		Surface
Direction	ft	m	Surface
12/30	7,677	2,340	Asphalt

Statistics (2024)
- Passengers: 761,339 (▲127.7)
- Cargo (tonnes): 21,686 (▲224.1%)
- Aircraft movements: 27,643 (▲84.7)
- Source: DGCA

Mozes Kilangin Airport (IATA: TIM, ICAO: WAYY) is a domestic airport located in Timika, the capital of Mimika Regency in Central Papua, Indonesia. The airport serves as the primary gateway to Timika, the largest town in Central Papua, and the Grasberg Mine, the world's largest gold mine, operated by Freeport-McMoRan. The airport is jointly operated by the Indonesian government and Freeport. The airport is named after Mozes Kilangin, a prominent figure from the Amungme tribe who played a significant role in the development of Freeport’s operations in Indonesia. The airport primarily serves inter-Papuan flights to cities such as Jayapura and Sorong, along with rural flights, as well as connections to other cities across Indonesia, including Makassar. In addition, the airport serves as the operating base for Airfast Indonesia, which primarily operates charter flights between Timika and other parts of Indonesia for Freeport employees.

The airport area and runway are shared with Yohanis Kapiyau Air Force Base, a Type C airbase of the TNI-AU (Indonesian Air Force). The airbase is named after Yohanis Kapiyau, a Papuan politician and pro-integration leader from Timika.

== History ==
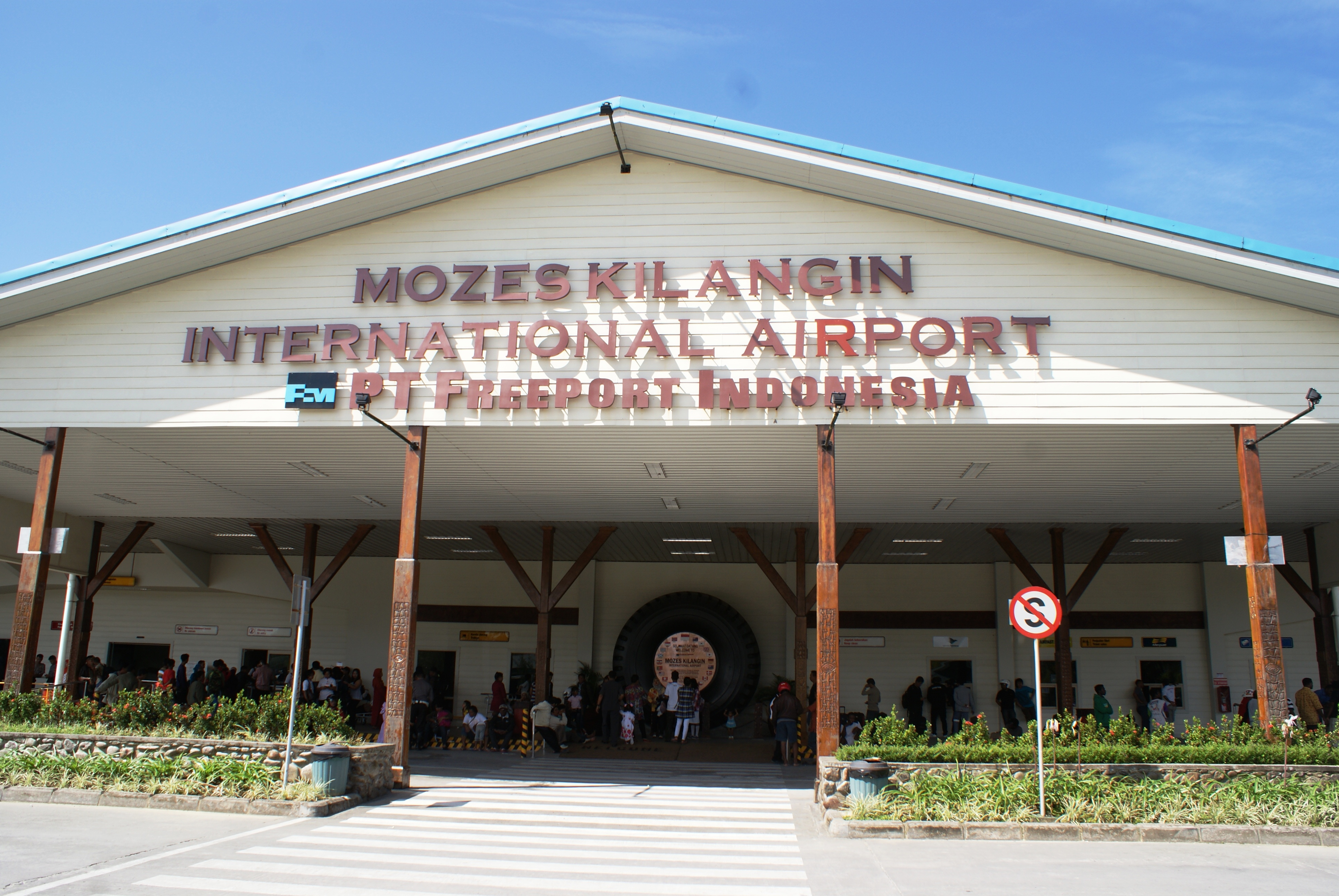
The old terminal, now primarily used for non-scheduled flights serving Freeport employees

Mozes Kilangin Airport, constructed in mid-1969 and officially inaugurated in 1971, was originally built by Freeport specifically to support the operations of the giant mining company at the Grasberg Mine. At its inception, the airport was designed solely for non-commercial flights, serving as a transport hub exclusively for Freeport employees. It was not until 2013 that the airport underwent a significant shift in ownership, with a partial transfer to the Indonesian government, which allowed for the expansion of services to include commercial flights. As of 2022, negotiations are underway to fully transfer the ownership of the airport to the Indonesian government.

In spring 1974, Merpati Nusantara Airlines operating a flight from Kupang to Timika via Darwin, marking the first airport in Central Papua to gain international status.

On 18 July 2008, Minister of Transportation Jusman Syafii Djamal officiated the elevation of Mozes Kilangin Airport's status to that of an international airport, a move that was anticipated to boost regional connectivity. However, due to the lack of international flights, the airport’s international status was soon revoked. Efforts have been made by the local government to restore the airport's international status, but these have yet to materialize.

To increase the airport's capacity, two new terminals were constructed. The first terminal, Terminal A, commenced partial operations in 2021 and was fully inaugurated in 2022, replacing the old terminal. Terminal B is currently under construction and is expected to be completed by late 2025.

Due to its proximity to the Papuan highlands, Yohanis Kapiyau Air Force Base, the military airbase located at the airport is considered as a vital strategic asset for the Indonesian military. It has served as a forward operating base for various military operations against Papuan separatist groups as part of the ongoing insurgency in Papua. Notable missions launched from the base include the rescue of hostages during the Mapenduma hostage crisis in 1996 and the Nduga hostage crisis between 2023 and 2024, during which a New Zealand pilot was taken captive by separatist forces.

Despite its strategic importance, the airbase lacks several essential facilities. It is currently without a military apron, base operations center, aircraft and helicopter shelters, hangars, office buildings, and a dedicated military fuel station. Furthermore, accommodations (mess facilities) for standby operational crews remain limited.

In view of these shortcomings—and considering the increasing operational demands, the planned deployment of an air squadron, and the proposed upgrade of the base to Type B status—additional land is required to expand administrative and residential facilities. As part of these development efforts, Yohanis Kapiyau Air Force Base is set to receive a grant from the Mimika Regency Government for the construction of a new apron and taxiway.

== Facilities and development ==
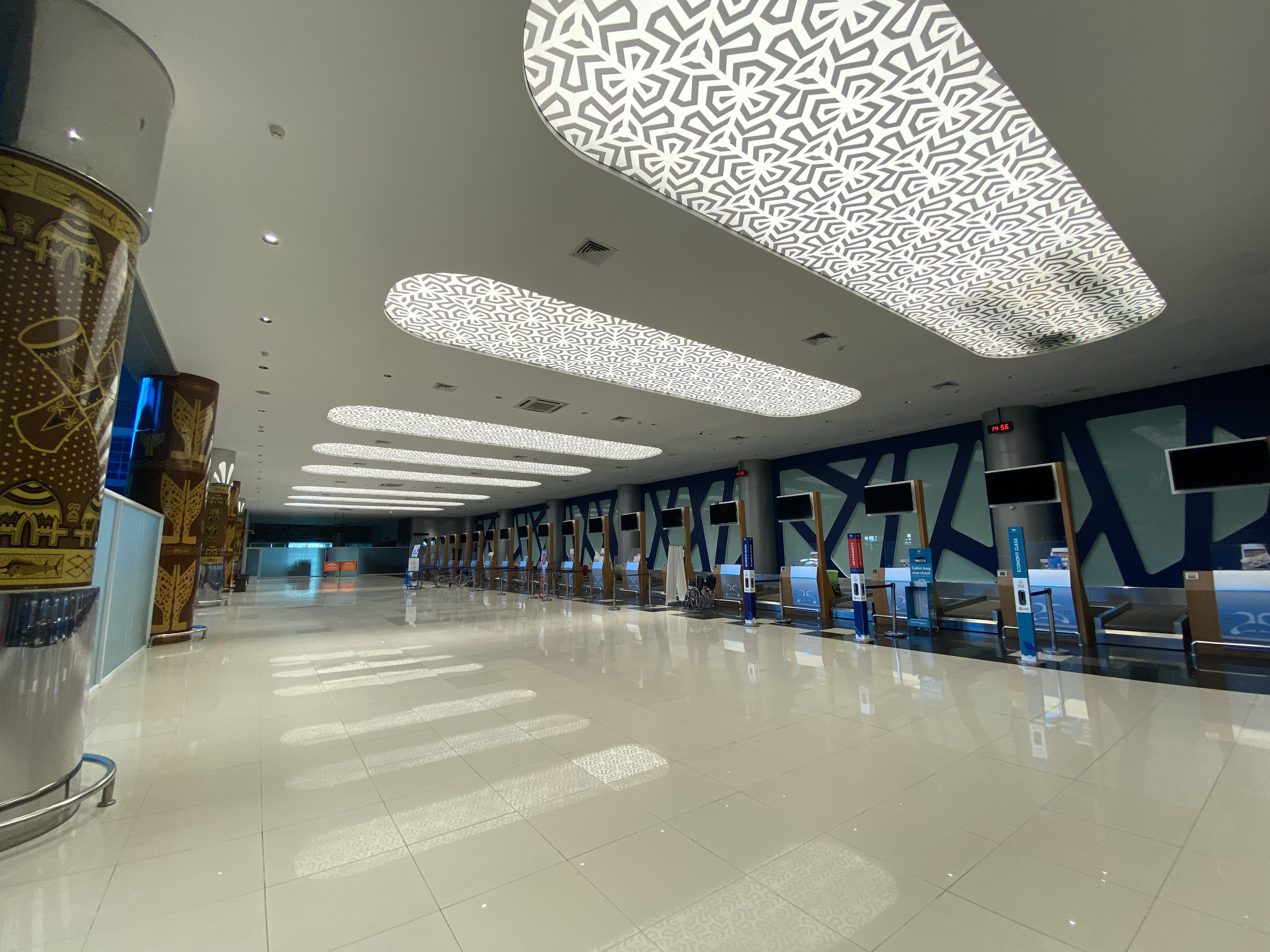
Terminal A check-in area

The airport has three terminals: Terminal A and Terminal B, both located on the south side of the runway, adjacent to each other. The old terminal, situated on the north side of the runway, is now exclusively used for non-scheduled charter flights, primarily operated by Airfast Indonesia for Freeport employees.

Terminal A began operations in July 2021, while Terminal B is still under construction and is expected to finish by the end of 2025. The two new terminals together cover a total area of 42,000 m², with each capable of accommodating up to 4,000 passengers daily. Terminal A features one airbridge, while Terminal B is equipped with three. Once Terminal B is completed, Terminal A will handle departures, while Terminal B will be dedicated to arrivals.

In addition to the construction of the terminals, the airport's runway has been upgraded to support night flights.

After its major expansion, Mozes Kilangin Airport is currently the largest airport in Western New Guinea. Future plans for the airport include extending the runway, widening the taxiway and apron, and constructing airplane hangars capable of accommodating aircraft such as the Cessna 208 Caravan, ATR-72, and even Boeing 737.

== Airlines and destinations ==
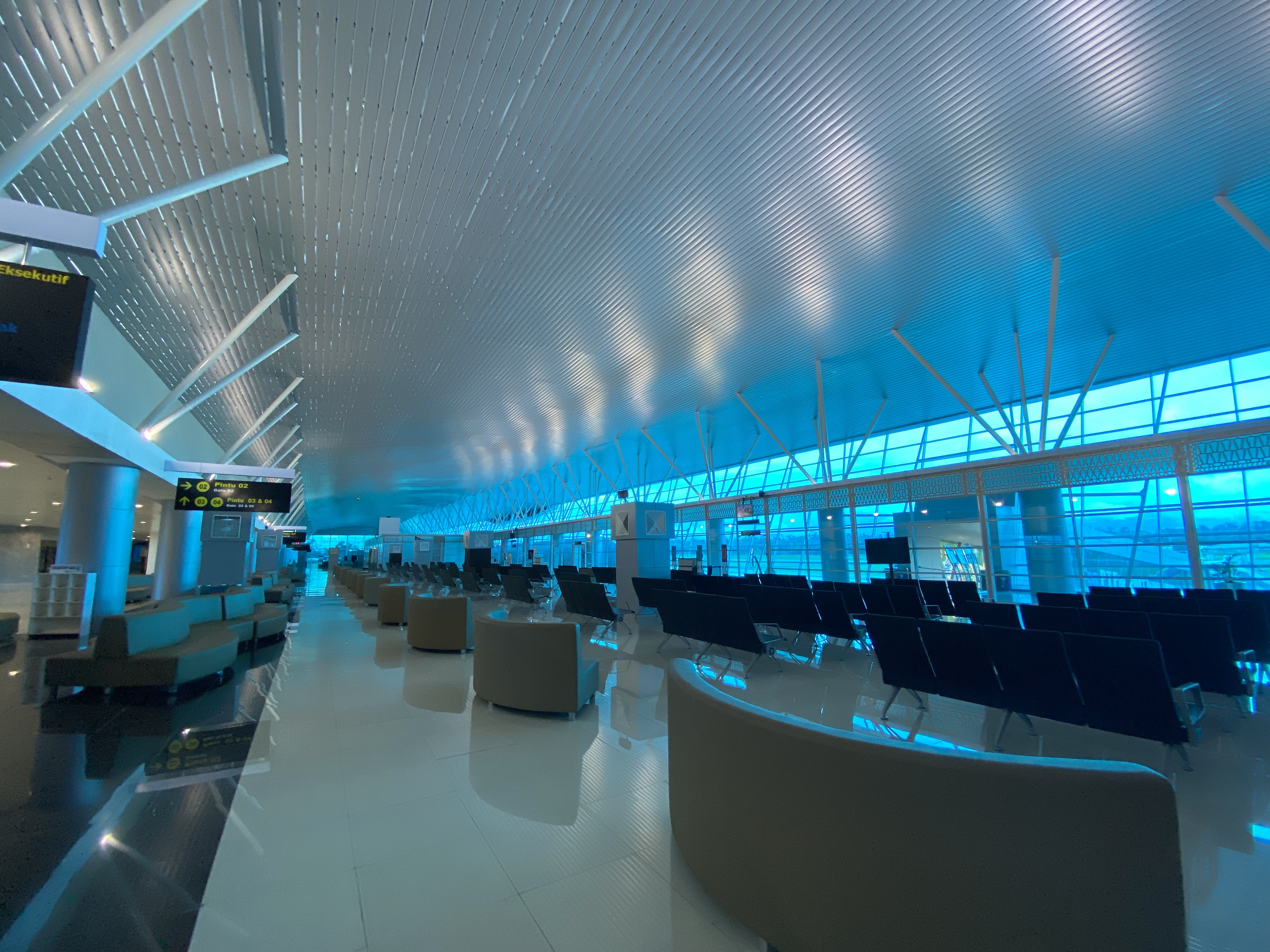
Boarding gate

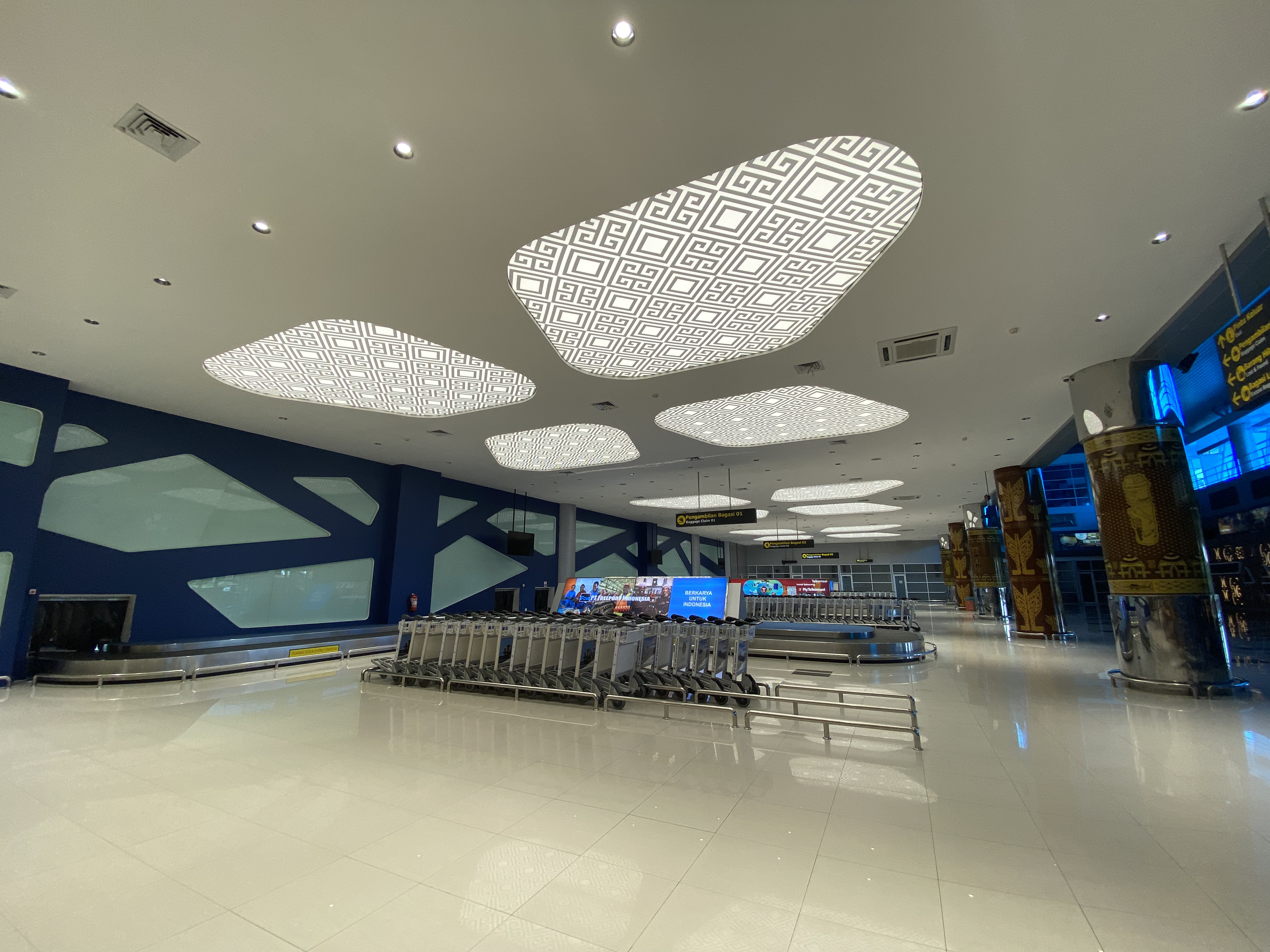
Baggage claim area

Airlines	Destinations
Airfast Indonesia	Charter: Denpasar, Jakarta–Soekarno-Hatta, Makassar, Manado, Solo, Surabaya, Yogyakarta–International
Asian One Air	Enarotali, Ilaga, Kaimana, Kepi, Kenyam, Moanemani, Mulia, Sinak, Waghete
Batik Air	Makassar, Sorong
Garuda Indonesia	Denpasar, Jakarta–Soekarno-Hatta, (Note: Jakarta–Soekarno-Hatta is continuation of Denpasar flight with the same flight number.) Jayapura
Lion Air	Jayapura, Makassar
Smart Aviation	Langgur
Sriwijaya Air	Jayapura, Makassar
TransNusa	Sorong
Trigana Air	Wamena
Wings Air	Agats, Nabire

== Statistics ==
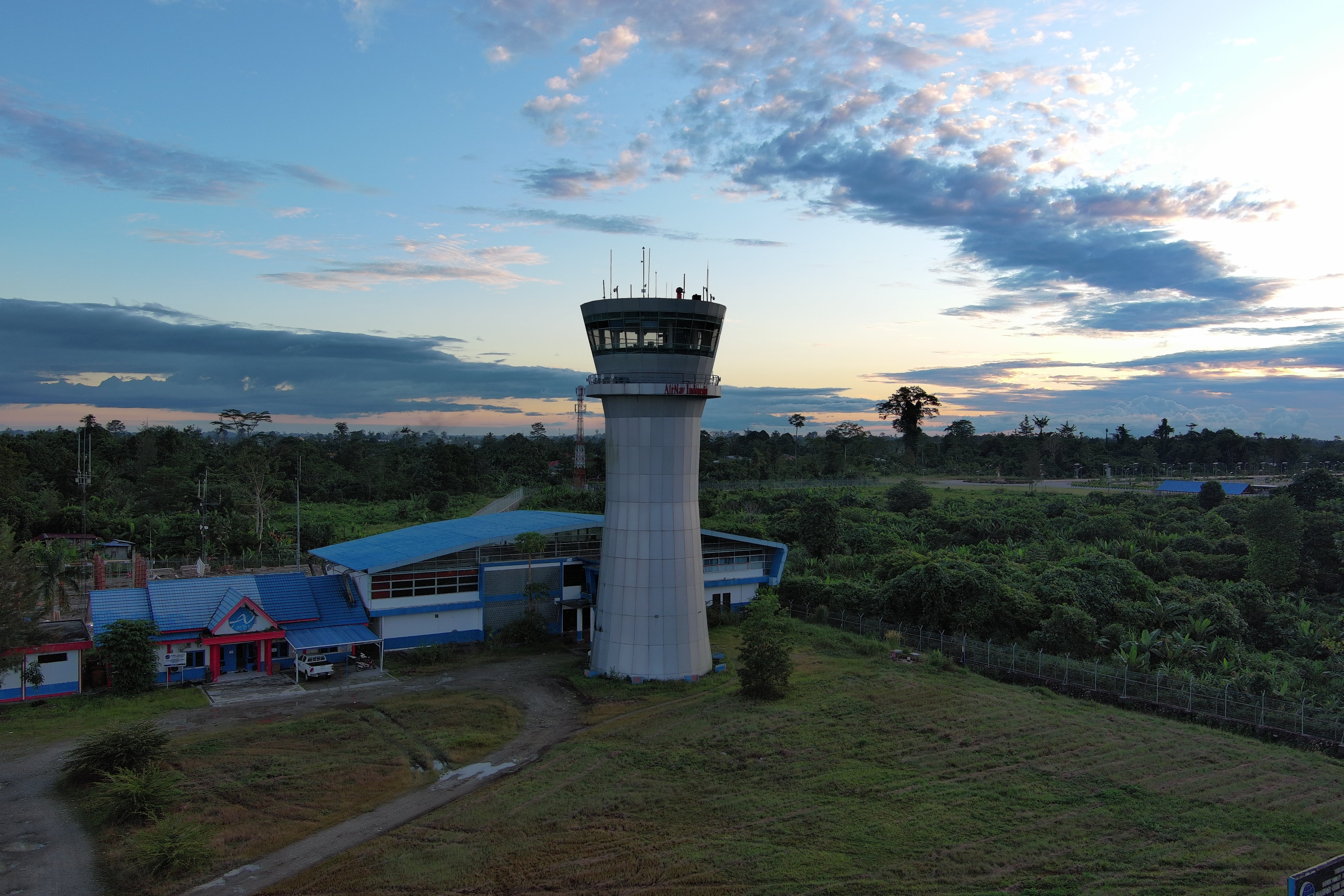
New ATC tower

Annual passenger numbers and aircraft statistics
Year	Passengers handled	Passenger % change	Cargo (tonnes)	Cargo % change	Aircraft movements	Aircraft % change
2006	258,282	Steady	1,998	Steady	11,042	Steady
2007	262,518	▲1.6	2,214	▲10.8	11,050	▲0.1
2008	289,152	▲10.1	3,953	▲78.5	14,280	▲29.2
2009	448,425	▲55.1	4,539	▲14.8	13,658	▼4.4
2010	463,854	▲3.4	4,199	▼7.5	21,202	▲55.2
2011	513,272	▲10.7	5,624	▲33.9	15,010	▼29.2
2012	363,303	▼29.2	4,449	▼20.9	10,822	▼27.9
2013	196,104	▼46.0	5,331	▲19.8	17,229	▲59.2
2014	225,190	▲14.8	3,800	▼28.7	9,137	▼47.0
2015	258,453	▲14.8	4,065	▲7.0	11,152	▲22.1
2016	470,634	▲82.1	8,754	▲115.4	23,508	▲110.8
2017	407,020	▼13.5	8,832	▲0.9	19,006	▼19.2
2018	845,185	▲107.7	25,830	▲192.5	40,173	▲111.4
2019	78,970	▼90.7	14,855	▼42.5	18,939	▼2.9
2020	195,339	▲147.4	18,391	▲23.8	18,215	▼3.8
2021	277,892	▲42.3	20,021	▲8.9	21,893	▲20.2
2022	149,294	▼46.3	4,062	▼79.7	8,718	▼60.2
2023	334,353	▲124.0	6,692	▲64.7	14,966	▲71.7
2024	761,339	▲127.7	21,686	▲224.1	27,643	▲84.7
^{Source: DGCA, BPS}

== Accidents and incidents ==
- The airport was the site of a mass shooting on 15 April 1996 by a member of Kopassus Sec. Lt. Sanurip. The shooting killed 16 people and injured 11 others.
- On 17 April 2023, an Indonesian Air Force Boeing 737-200 arriving from Ambon skidded off the runway while landing at Mozes Kilangin Airport in Timika. no fatalities were reported in the incident.
