= Sentani International Airport =

Airport in Jayapura, Papua, Indonesia

Sentani International Airport Bandar Udara Internasional Sentani
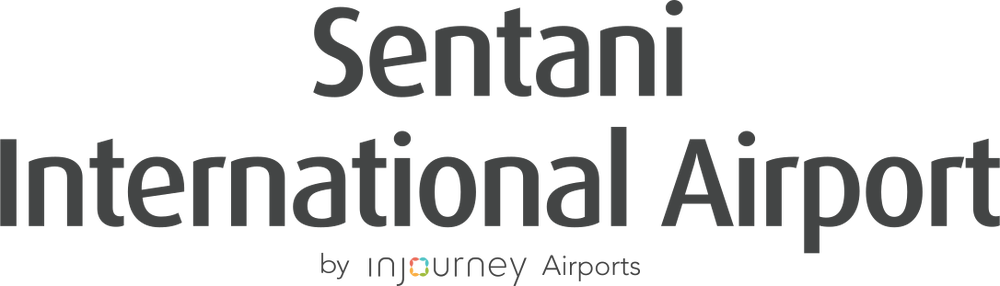

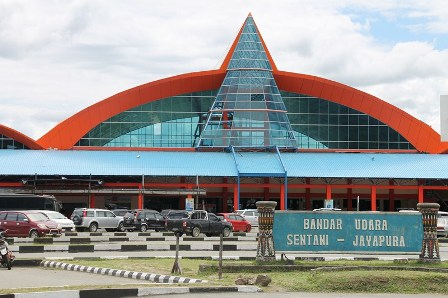
- IATA: DJJ; ICAO: WAJJ; WMO: 97690

Summary
- Airport type: Public / Military
- Owner: Government of Indonesia
- Operator: InJourney Airports
- Serves: Jayapura
- Location: Sentani, Jayapura Regency, Papua, Indonesia
- Operating base for: Jayawijaya Dirgantara; Susi Air; Trigana Air
- Time zone: WIT (UTC+09:00)
- Elevation AMSL: 289 ft (88 m)
- Coordinates: 2°34′37″S 140°30′58″E
- Website: www.sentani-airport.co.id/en

Maps
- Western New Guinea region in Indonesia

- Location in Papua Location in Western New Guinea Location in Indonesia DJJ/WAJJ (Southeast Asia) DJJ/WAJJ (Asia)

Runways
Direction	Length		Surface
Direction	m	ft	Surface
12/30	3,000	9,843	Asphalt

Statistics (2024)
- Passengers: 1,919,486 (▲11.09%)
- Cargo (tonnes): 127,409.20 (▼2.21%)
- Aircraft movements: 45,303 (▼1.59%)
- Source: DGCA

Sentani International Airport (IATA: DJJ, ICAO: WAJJ) — also known as Dortheys Hiyo Eluay International Airport — is an airport serving Jayapura, the capital of Papua province, Indonesia, on the island of New Guinea. It is located in the town (kelurahan) of Sentani, within Sentani District, approximately 40 km from downtown Jayapura. The name “Sentani” is derived from nearby Lake Sentani, while the airport's official name honors Theys Eluay (1937–2001), a Papuan politician from Sentani. The airport is the easternmost in Indonesia and serves as the main hub as well as the largest and busiest airport in Western New Guinea and on the island of New Guinea as a whole. It functions as the primary gateway to the region, with connections to major Indonesian cities such as Jakarta and Makassar, as well as other cities and towns in Western New Guinea including Biak, Sorong, and Merauke. In addition, it serves as a hub for pioneer routes to remote interior areas of Western New Guinea. Although designated as an international airport, it currently does not operate international flights, despite having previously served routes to Papua New Guinea.

In addition to its role as a civilian airport, Sentani International Airport also hosts Silas Papare Air Force Base, a Type-A base of the Indonesian Air Force. The airbase is located to the southwest of the passenger terminal.

== History ==
=== World War II ===
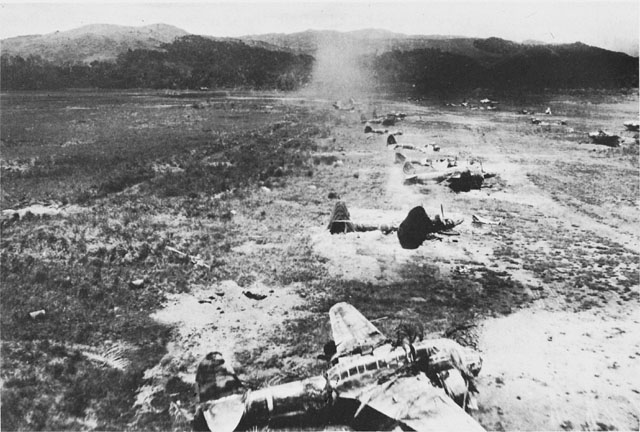
Destroyed Japanese aircraft at Hollandia Airfield following raids by the U.S. Fifth Air Force in April 1944

The Sentani area was occupied by Japanese forces in early 1942, following the invasion of the Dutch East Indies during the Pacific theater of World War II. Recognizing its strategic importance, the Japanese developed a major military base in the area. By 10 October 1943, a large airfield complex had been constructed, featuring two runways: a western runway measuring 4,500 ft and a southern runway measuring 6,200 ft. The facility included 24 large bomber revetments to the west of the strip and an additional 27 to the east, all connected by taxiways to the two runways. Air defenses initially consisted of four light anti-aircraft guns, which were later upgraded. Despite these defenses, the airfields were heavily cratered by American bombing raids. Originally built as a military airfield, construction was carried out rapidly and was primarily intended to accommodate Mitsubishi Zero fighter aircraft, which had a maximum takeoff weight of only 2.7 tons. As fighting with Allied forces intensified, the airfield was reinforced with hundreds of Japanese fighter aircraft.

By April 1944, the Japanese had developed several airfields in the area: three had been completed, while a fourth was still under construction. Of these, only one was considered fully operational. These bases were captured by American forces during the Battle of Hollandia on 26 April 1944. During these engagements, the Allies reportedly lost only four aircraft. However, the runway itself was constructed with minimal preparation and was only roughly compacted, which made operations challenging. Fully loaded Allied bombers, in particular, faced difficulty taking off safely without risking collision with the nearby Cyclops Mountains. American engineers were then assigned to construct a new runway on the site of the former Japanese airfield. This new runway had to be stronger and capable of supporting American aircraft that were up to ten times heavier than the Japanese Zero fighters. The runway was reinforced and widened to accommodate long-range heavy bombers such as the B-29 Superfortress.

Following their capture, the airfields were extensively reconstructed and transformed into a major command-and-control hub, supporting numerous operational units conducting combat missions with both fighter aircraft and heavy bombers. Under American control, the complex consisted of three principal military airfields: Hollandia, Sentani Airport, and Cyclops. By the end of the World War II, Hollandia Airfield had been abandoned and was gradually reclaimed by dense vegetation by the early 2010s. More recent aerial imagery indicates that a large-scale residential development is now underway on the site. Cyclops Airfield, a single-runway facility located to the northeast of Sentani and originally constructed by Japanese forces, was likewise abandoned and has since been absorbed into the expanding urban area of Sentani. The airfield is historically significant as it once served as the headquarters of Douglas MacArthur at Hollandia prior to the liberation of the Philippines. Sentani Airfield is the only part of the complex still in use as an airfield today.

==== Major USAAF units stationed at Hollandia ====
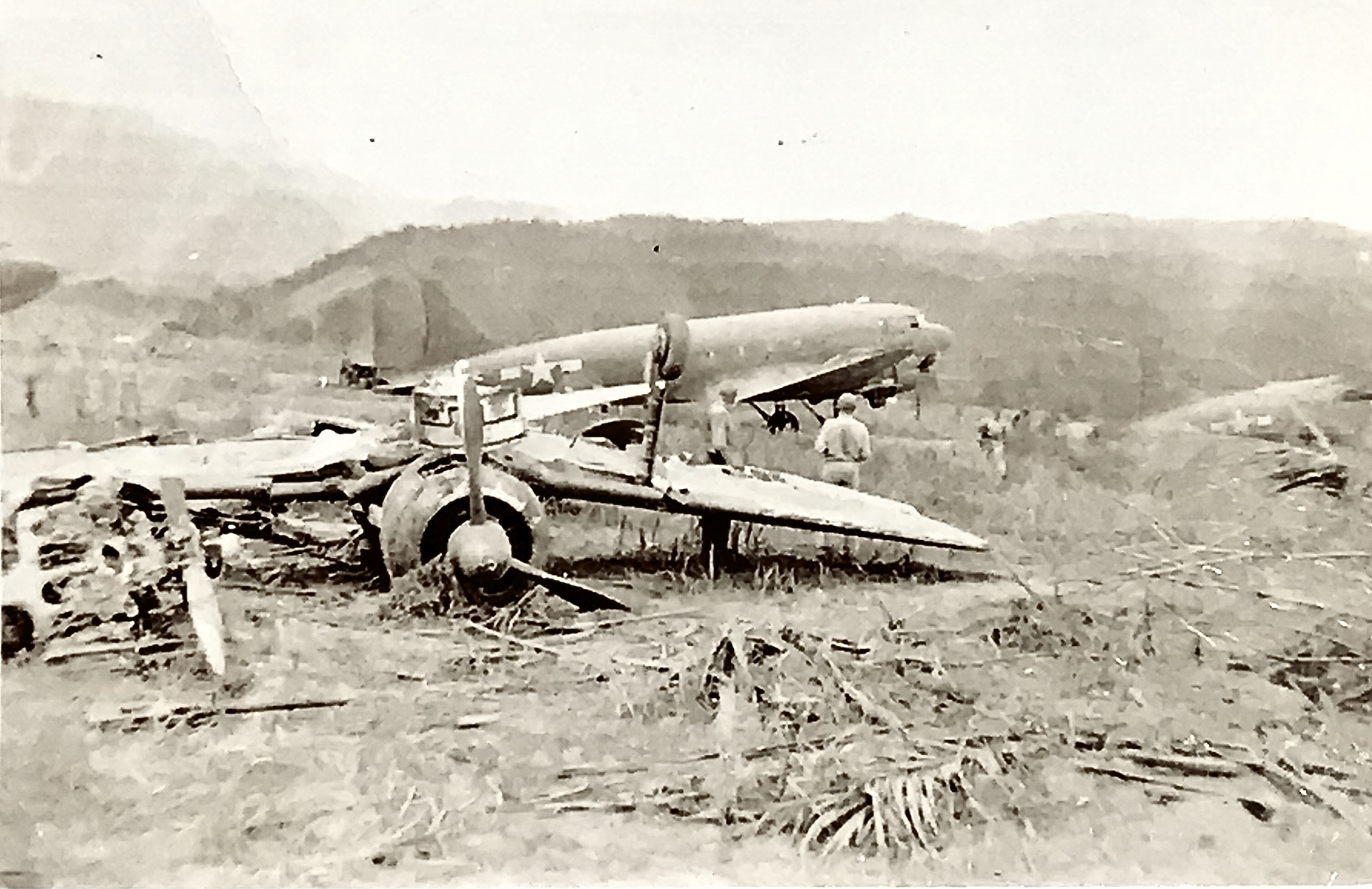
U.S. forces at Hollandia Airfield following its capture

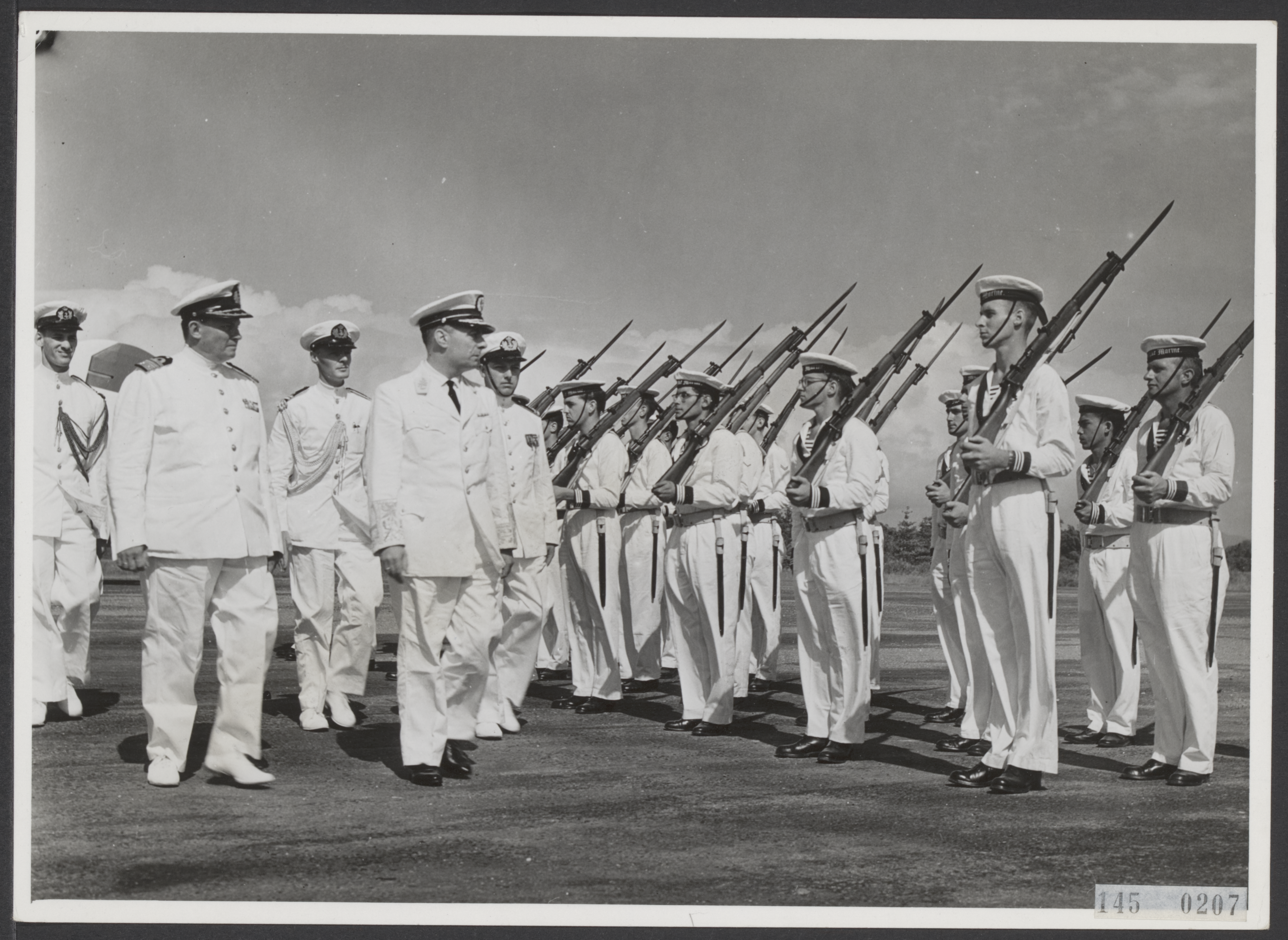
The new governor of Netherlands New Guinea, P. J. Platteel, is greeted by an honor guard upon arrival at Sentani Airport, 1958

- 308th Bombardment Wing (10 August-22 October 1944)
- 310th Bombardment Wing (6 May-18 September 1944)
- 85th Fighter Wing (24 July-24 October 1944)
- 3d Bombardment Group (12 May-16 November 1944)
- 312th Bombardment Group (June-19 November 1944)
- 49th Fighter Group (17 May-5 June 1944)
- 475th Fighter Group (15 May-14 July 1944)
- 317th Troop Carrier Group (June-17 November 1944)
- 418th Night Fighter Squadron (12 May-28 September 1944)

=== Contemporary history ===
After the World War II, the government of Netherlands New Guinea made use of the remaining infrastructure left behind by both Japanese and Allied forces. This included Sentani Airport, which served as the main airfield in the colonial capital during the Dutch administration. Subsequently, the Dutch established an aviation hub operated by KLM at Mokmer Airfield in Biak. KLM began its operations in Netherlands New Guinea on 14 July 1955 under the name Nederlands Nieuw Guinea Luchtvaart Maatschappij, more commonly known at the time as De Kroonduif NV, symbolized by the crowned pigeon (mambruk). In addition to the de Havilland Canada DHC-2 Beaver that served flights across Papua at the time, Douglas DC-3—commonly known as the Dakota—was also widely used. Its military variant, the Douglas C-47 Skytrain, operated routes from Sentani to Biak, as well as to Merauke and Wamena. Another aircraft type in use was the de Havilland Canada DHC-6 Twin Otter. Aside from functioning as a civilian airport, the airport at the time also hosted an airbase of the Royal Netherlands Air Force.

When Indonesia assumed control of Papua in 1963, both the Twin Otter and Dakota aircraft continued to be used. Around this period, Merpati Nusantara Airlines was established, utilizing aircraft inherited from the former Dutch operators. The airline operated Dakota aircraft provided through assistance from the Canadian government via a United Nations agency known as Fund West Irian (FUNDWI), aimed at supporting socio-economic development in the then West Irian Province. Through this program, Twin Otter aircraft were also procured to support pioneer flights across the region.

Sentani Airport features signs that read Dilarang makan pinang ("Consumption of betel nuts is prohibited") posted on walls throughout the terminal. A sight that often attracts the attention of foreign travelers, these were posted in the late 2000s as the airport management's response to the local population's tendencies to chew areca nuts then dispose of red residue (caused by chewing) by spitting on public ground, leaving an unsightly stain on the ground.

On 14 October 2019, the management of the airport was transferred from the Ministry of Transportation to Angkasa Pura I, which was later rebranded as InJourney Airports.

==== International flights ====
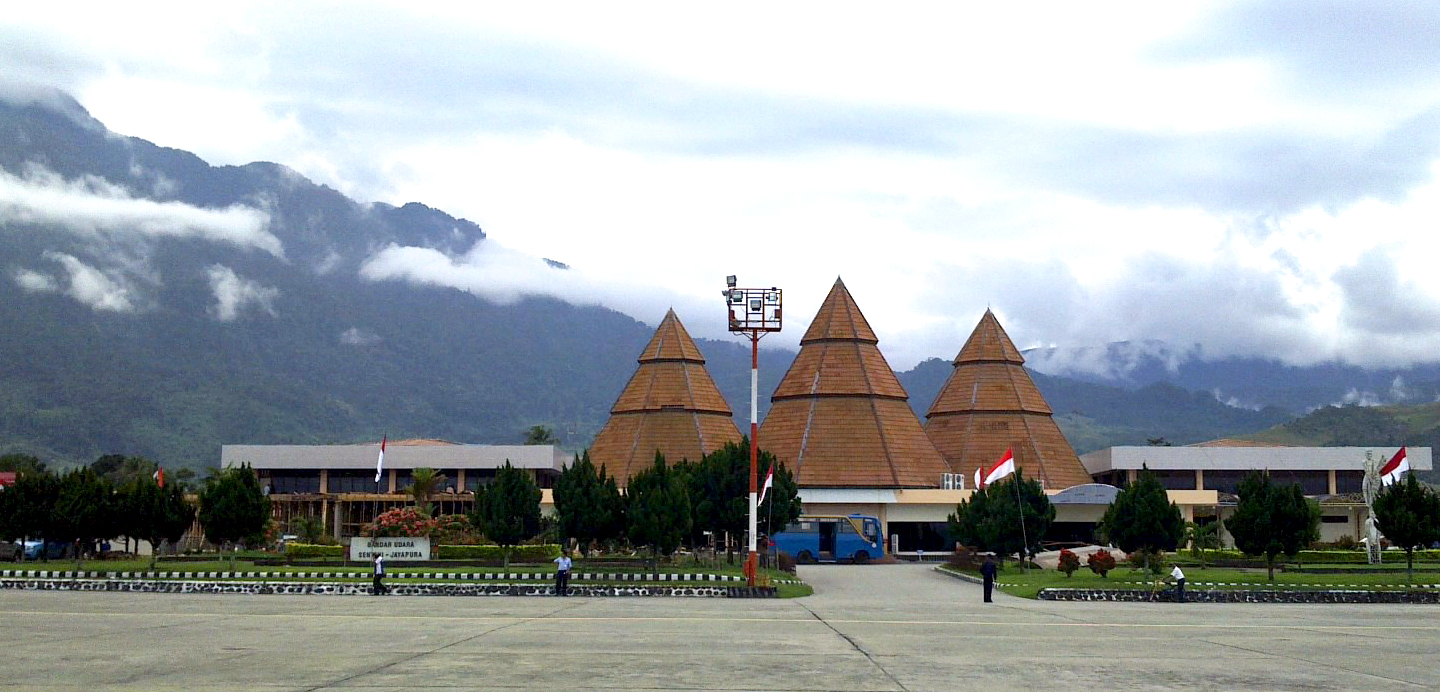
Sentani Airport terminal before its 2012 renovation

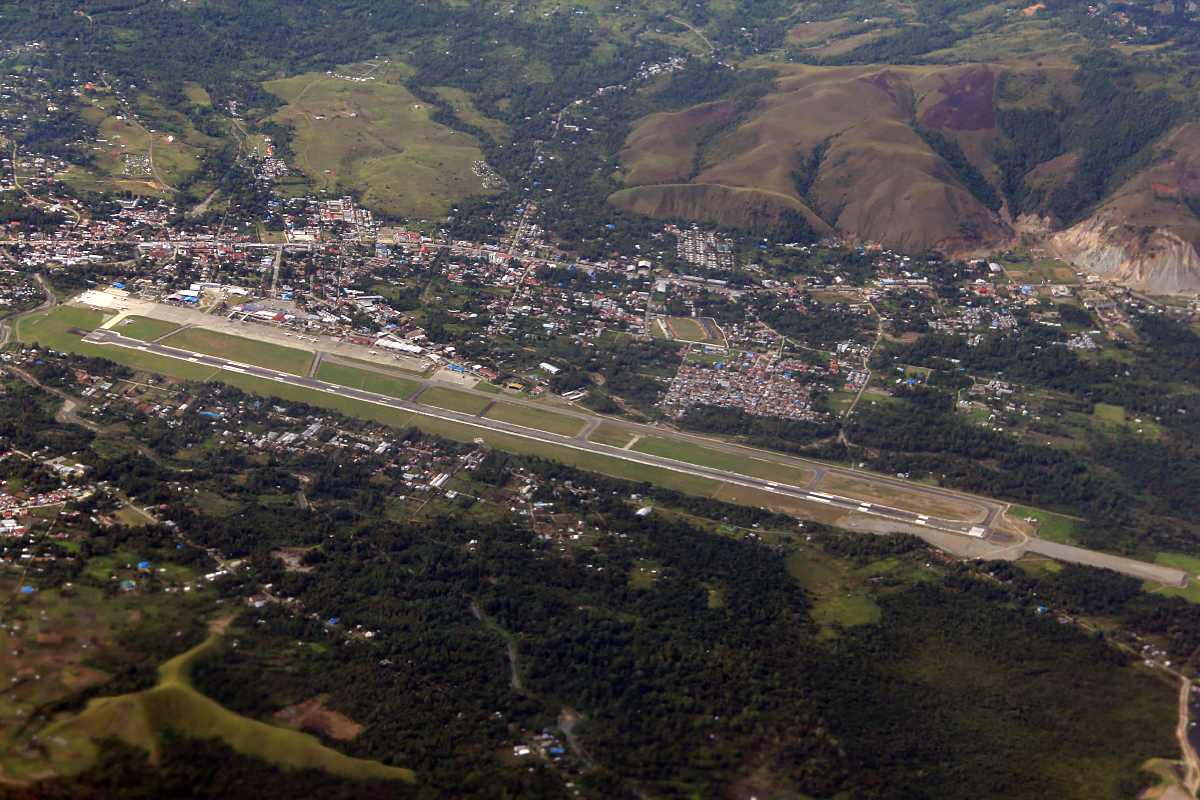
Aerial view of Sentani Airport, 2013

In July 1959, De Kroonduif, a subsidiary of KLM, launched its first and only international route from Hollandia to Lae, in what was then the Territory of New Guinea. The weekly service ended when Indonesia assumed control of Netherlands New Guinea, marking the only scheduled cross-border service between the two administrations. The route briefly resumed in the 1970s, this time operated by Merpati Nusantara Airlines, but was discontinued again shortly thereafter. Papua New Guinea’s flag carrier, Air Niugini, also operated routes between Jayapura and Madang in the 1970s, using Douglas DC-3 aircraft.

In the 1980s, there were weekly services to Port Moresby, Papua New Guinea, via Wewak and Vanimo, operated by Air Niugini.

Currently, there are no regular international flights to Jayapura, aside from occasional charter services to and from Australia. There have been proposals to resume regular international flights to Papua New Guinea, including a 2018 plan to launch a route between Jayapura and Mount Hagen to be operated by the Papua New Guinean carrier PNG Air; however, it has yet to materialize.

==== Name change ====
On 20 October 2020, Governor of Papua Lukas Enembe proposed to officially change the name of Sentani International Airport to Dortheys Hiyo Eluay International Airport. Enembe stated that the name, which stands for Papuan late former legislative member and activist Theys Hiyo Eluay, was a form of respect for "one of the charismatic Papuan figures" and a public figure of Sentani tribe, whose people is the owner of customary land rights of the airport. Furthermore, Regent of Jayapura Mathius Awoitauw says that he was the axis of change for all indigenous peoples in Papua, so that so he hoped the public "would not have to argue anymore" and "have the same perception". However, Tribal Council of Sentani (Dewan Adat Suku Sentani) rejects the name change, citing lack of consultation with Sentani people who owned the land. According to Yanto Eluay, son of Theys Eluay, the naming was in honour of Theys' effort as figure for PEPERA in 1969 to unite West New Guinea with Indonesia. Regional regulation on the name was passed by the legislative body of Jayapura Regency and was approved later by Ministry of Transportation. Although, as of 2022, the official name of the airport is still Sentani International Airport.

== Facilities and development ==
In October 2012, The Ministry of Transportation announced plans to extend the length of the airport's runway to 3,000 meters, add a parallel taxiway, and to expand the passenger terminal to accommodate jet bridges to board and disembark passengers. Following the renovation, the airside facilities at Sentani Airport include a runway measuring 3,000 m x 45 m, with apron capacity for 13 parking stands for narrow-body aircraft, 8 parking stands for cargo aircraft, and 11 parking stands for small propeller aircraft. Following the runway extension, Sentani Airport can accommodate narrow-body aircraft such as the Boeing 737-800 and 737-900ER, as well as wide-body aircraft such as the Airbus A330. The terminal building covers an area of 14,300 square meters across two floors, with a waiting area capacity of up to 2,045 passengers. The terminal is also equipped with three airbridges.

Due to limited land, which makes further expansion of airport facilities more challenging, and the steady increase in passenger numbers each year, there has been a proposal to relocate the airport to the opposite bank of Lake Sentani. However, this plan remains under consideration due to budget constraints.

== Airlines and destinations ==
=== Passenger ===
Airlines	Destinations
Batik Air	Jakarta–Soekarno-Hatta, Makassar
Citilink	Jakarta–Soekarno-Hatta, (Note: Jakarta–Soekarno-Hatta is continuation of Makassar flight as the same flight number) Makassar
Garuda Indonesia	Jakarta–Soekarno-Hatta, Merauke, Timika
Lion Air	Biak, Jakarta–Soekarno-Hatta, Makassar, Manokwari, Manado, (Note: Manado is continuation of Sorong flight as the same flight number) Merauke, Sorong, Timika
Sriwijaya Air	Biak, Makassar, Nabire, Sorong, Timika, Wamena
Susi Air	Apalapsili, Batom, Bokondini, Borme, Dabra, Diphikin, Dou, Elelim, Illu, Kanggime, Kasonaweja, Karubaga, Kiwirok, Kobakma, Luban, Mamit, Mararena, Mulia, Sarmi, Taria, Teraplu, Tiom, Wari
Trigana Air	Dekai, Oksibil, Serui, Tanah Merah, Wamena
Wings Air	Nabire, Wamena

=== Cargo ===
Airlines	Destinations
Cardig Air	Wamena
Jayawijaya Dirgantara	Wamena
My Indo Airlines	Wamena

== Statistics ==
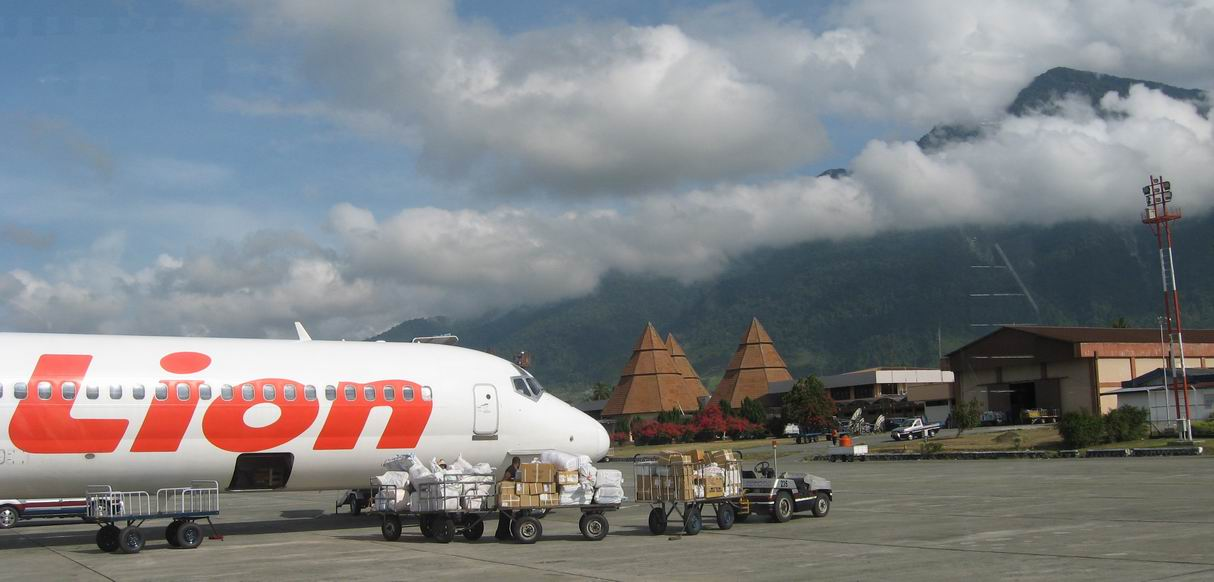
Lion Air MD-83 parked at Sentani Airport of Jayapura

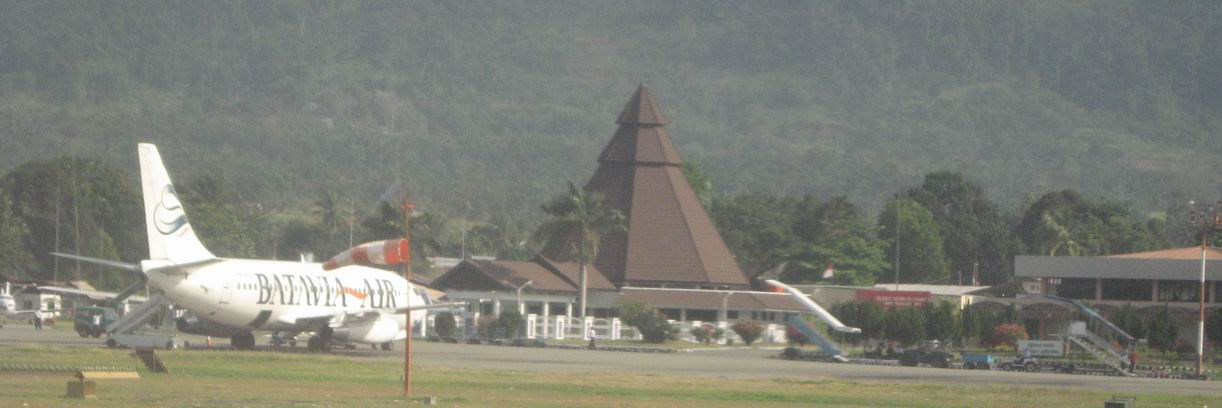
Batavia Air Boeing 737-200 parked at Sentani Airport of Jayapura

Annual passenger numbers and aircraft statistics
Year	Passengers handled	Passenger % change	Cargo (tonnes)	Cargo % change	Aircraft movements	Aircraft % change
2006	718,510	Steady	51,180.12	Steady	28,852	Steady
2007	774,689	▲7.82	32,694.32	▼36.12	33,419	▲15.83
2008	428,262	▼44.72	21,050.82	▼35.61	17,174	▼48.61
2009	942,526	▲120.08	18,845.17	▼10.48	41,350	▲140.77
2010	1,070,525	▲13.58	74,644.57	▲296.09	42,100	▲1.81
2011	997,897	▼6.78	48,795.76	▼34.63	38,930	▼7.53
2012	1,385,055	▲38.80	186,088.07	▲281.36	51,253	▲31.65
2013	1,727,926	▲24.76	92,455.82	▼50.32	55,248	▲7.79
2014	1,570,093	▼9.13	108,032.19	▲16.85	53,112	▼3.87
2015	1,754,075	▲11.72	169,272.07	▲56.69	57,862	▲8.94
2016	1,751,375	▼0.15	77,716.29	▼54.09	61,229	▲5.82
2017	2,207,439	▲26.04	70,500.86	▼9.28	62,072	▲1.38
2018	2,337,329	▲5.88	143,775.26	▲103.93	63,482	▲2.27
2019	1,860,382	▼20.41	129,163.66	▼10.16	60,113	▼5.31
2020	839,304	▼54.89	125,288.45	▼3.00	41,683	▼30.66
2021	1,367,907	▲62.98	112,145.94	▼10.49	43,903	▲5.33
2022	1,727,230	▲26.27	134,234.57	▲19.70	51,341	▲16.94
2023	1,727,865	▲0.04	130,287.64	▼2.94	46,037	▼10.33
2024	1,919,486	▲11.09	127,409.20	▼2.21	45,303	▼1.59
^{Source: DGCA, BPS}

== Ground transport ==
=== Bus ===
DAMRI buses provide a connection between the airport and Jayapura city center, with a journey time of approximately one hour. The route includes stops at the Jayapura DAMRI Pool, Hotel Horison Jayapura, Jayapura Mall, Argapura, Polimak, Entrop, Abepura, and Sentani Airport. From the Jayapura DAMRI Pool, buses depart daily from 4:30 a.m. to 11:30 a.m., operating at hourly intervals. From Sentani Airport, departures are also available daily, running from 7:00 a.m. to 2:00 p.m.

=== Rail ===
Proposals have been made to develop a light rail transit (LRT) system connecting Jayapura and Sentani Airport. The planned line would span approximately 37 km, with a minimum estimated cost of IDR 25 trillion as of 2016. The proposed LRT corridor from Mandala Stadium to Sentani Airport is expected to include 11 strategic stations for passenger boarding and alighting, located at Mandala Stadium, the Papua Governor's Office, Cenderawasih Sports Hall, Mesran Terminal, Hamadi Market, Entrop Terminal, Youtefa Market, Tanah Hitam (Abe Pantai), Waena Expo, Kampung Harapan, and Sentani Airport.

== Accidents and incidents ==
- On 25 February 2020, a Trigana Air Boeing 737-300 carrying cargo bound for Wamena skidded off the runway at Sentani Airport while preparing for takeoff. No occupants were injured, but the runway was temporarily closed to allow for the aircraft's evacuation.
- On 22 October 2021, a Jayawijaya Dirgantara Boeing 737-300SF skidded off the runway at Sentani Airport after landing from Wamena. No occupants were injured, and the aircraft was successfully removed from the runway a few hours later.
- On 18 December 2021, just three minutes after takeoff from Sentani Airport, a Jayawijaya Dirgantara Boeing 737-300SF bound for Wamena returned to base after experiencing issues with its right engine, which subsequently caught fire. All four occupants were uninjured. The incident was suspected to have been caused by overloading.
- On 5 November 2024, Trigana Air Flight 237, a Boeing 737-500, caught fire while taxiing at Sentani Airport in preparation for departure to Wamena. Of the 121 occupants, four sustained minor injuries. The aircraft was subsequently returned to the terminal, and passengers disembarked for further inspection.

== See also ==
- USAF in the Southwest Pacific
