= Asia Cargo Airlines =

Indonesian cargo airline

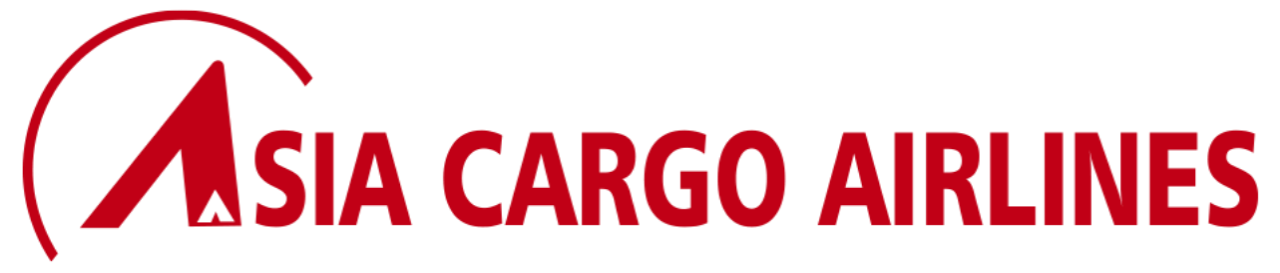
| IATA | ICAO | Call sign |
|---|---|---|
| GM | TMG | TRILINES |
- Founded: September 1990; 36 years ago
- Hubs: Halim Perdanakusuma International Airport
- Fleet size: 9
- Destinations: 7
- Headquarters: Jakarta, Indonesia
- Key people: Gibbrael Isaak (President Director) Marco Isaak (Managing Director)
- Website: trimgairlines.com

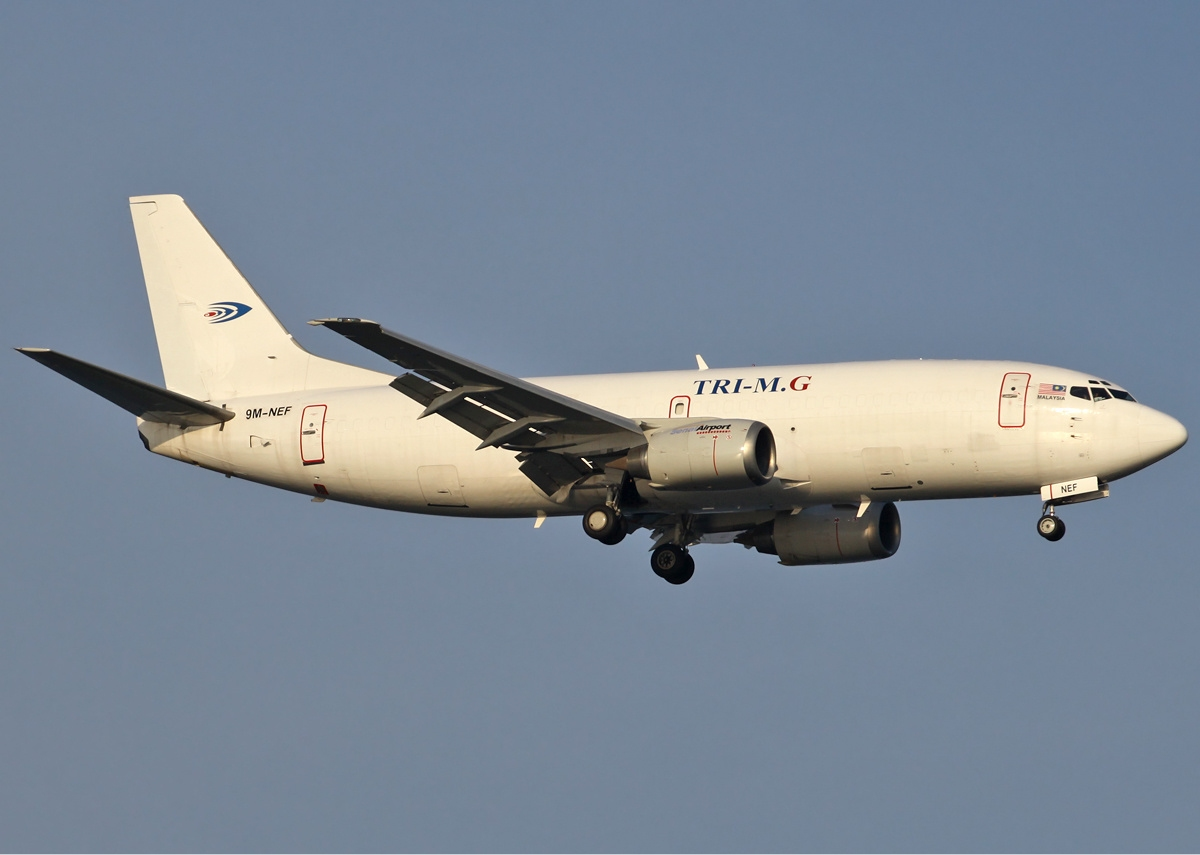
A Tri-MG Intra Asia Airlines Boeing 737-300F.

Asia Cargo Airlines (previously known as Tri-MG Intra Asia Airlines) is an airline that mainly operates cargo aircraft on scheduled routes for contract charters and non-scheduled routes for ad-hoc charters.

Tri-MG Airlines are based in Halim Perdanakusuma International Airport, Jakarta, Indonesia.

Apart from cargo flight operations, they operate light aircraft for passengers as well. They also provide medical evacuation services (Medivac) for patients who require to be airlifted on special charters for hospitalisation and associated treatment.

== History ==
The airline was founded in September 1990.

== Destinations ==
Asia Cargo Airlines serves the following destinations:

Indonesia

- Balikpapan – Sultan Aji Muhammad Sulaiman Sepinggan Airport
- Bandung – Kertajati International Airport
- Jakarta – Halim Perdanakusuma International Airport (Hub)
- Pekanbaru – Sultan Syarif Kasim II International Airport

Singapore

- Singapore – Changi Airport

During the COVID-19 pandemic, the airline operated cargo flights to Malaysia as well.

Malaysia

- Johor Bahru – Senai International Airport
- Kota Kinabalu – Kota Kinabalu International Airport
- Kuala Lumpur – Kuala Lumpur International Airport

== Fleet ==
The Asia Cargo Airlines fleet includes the following aircraft:

Asia Cargo Airlines fleet
| Aircraft | In service | Orders | Notes |
|---|---|---|---|
| Boeing 737-800SF | 1 | 1 | (as of July 2026) |
| Boeing 737-300F | 2 | | (as of July 2026) |
| Bombardier CRJ200 | 1 | | (as of July 2026) |
| Beechcraft Hawker 400XP | 2 | — | |
| Beechcraft Hawker 800XP | 1 | — | |
| Total | 9 | 2 | |

Tri-MG Intra Asia Airlines previously operated the following aircraft (as of September 2009):

Tri-MG Intra Asia Airlines fleet
| Aircraft | In service | Orders | Notes |
|---|---|---|---|
| Antonov An-12 | 1 | — | |
| Antonov An-26 | 1 | — | |
| Antonov An-32 | 1 | — | |
| Boeing 727-100F | 1 | — | |
| Boeing 727-200F | 4 | — | |
| Boeing 737-200QC | 2 | — | |
| Total | 10 | — | |

== Incidents and accidents ==
- On 4 January 2005, while carrying out a relief operation to the tsunami-stricken area of Banda Aceh, a Boeing 737-2A9C (PK-YGM) struck a water buffalo that had entered the runway just as it was making its landing at Sultan Iskandarmuda Airport (Banda Aceh). This resulted in the main gear on the port side collapsing which damaged the gear and port engine. There were no injuries and the aircraft was declared a write-off and scrapped several months later.
- On 18 July 2017, a Boeing 737-300F registered as PK-YGG bounced and slid off from Runway 15 of Wamena Airport, Wamena. Although no one was killed or injured in the incident, the incident caused substantial damage on the plane.
