= Tanah Merah Airport =

Airport in Papua, Indonesia

Tanah Merah Airport Bandar Udara Tanah Merah
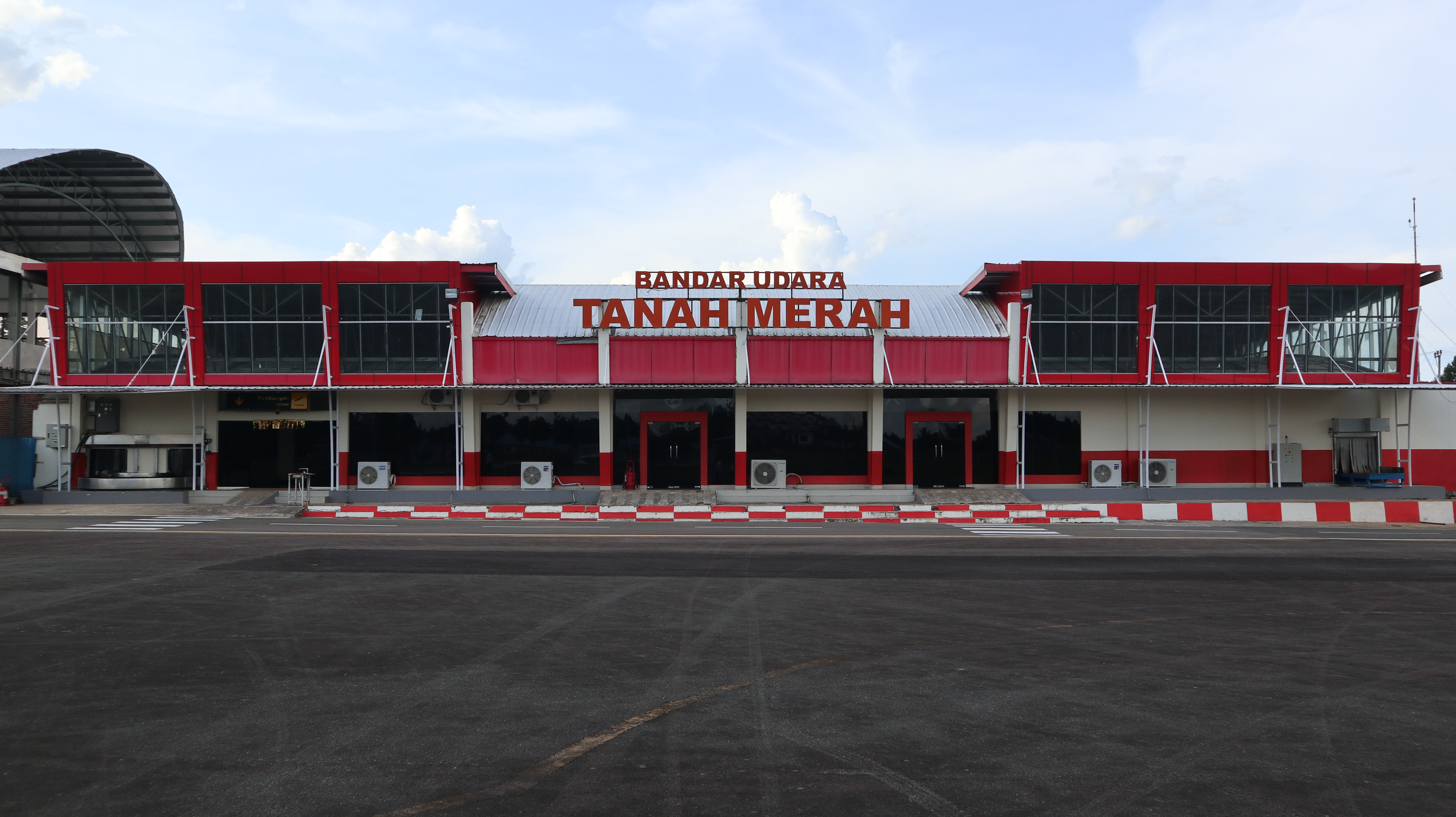
- IATA: TMH; ICAO: WAKT

Summary
- Airport type: Public
- Owner: Government of Indonesia
- Operator: Ministry of Transportation
- Serves: Tanahmerah and Mappi
- Location: Boven Digoel Regency, South Papua, Indonesia
- Time zone: WITA (UTC+09:00)
- Elevation AMSL: 25.4 m (83 ft)
- Coordinates: 6.096926°S 140.303564°E

Map
- Location in South Papua Location in Indonesia

Runways
Direction	Length		Surface
Direction	m	ft	Surface
07/25	1,400	4,593	Asphalt
- Sources: DJPU

Tanah Merah Airport (Indonesian: Bandar Udara Tanah Merah) (IATA: TMH, ICAO: WAKT) is one of the airports serving the Boven Digoel Regency, in the Indonesian province of South Papua. It is located in the regency's capital of Tanahmerah.

The airport served 2,200 passengers throughout 2016. It has serviced flights with the provincial capital at Jayapura (Dortheys Hiyo Eluay International Airport) and Merauke (Mopah Airport) to the south. Both routes are serviced by Trigana Air.

The airport was briefly closed during the eruption of the Manam volcano in Papua New Guinea in 2015.

== Incidents ==
- An XpressAir Dornier 328 with 33 passengers ran off the side of the runway on 14 June 2009, with the aircraft substantially damaged although there were no casualties.
