= Bokondini Airport =

Bokondini Airport Bandar Udara Bokondini
- IATA: BUI; ICAO: WAVB

Summary
- Location: Bokondini, Tolikara Regency, Highland Papua, Indonesia
- Time zone: WITA (UTC+09:00)
- Elevation AMSL: 4,593 ft (1,400 m)
- Coordinates: 3.684660°S 138.680030°E

Map
- Location in Western New Guinea Location in Indonesia

Runways
Direction	Length		Surface
Direction	ft	m	Surface
	3,050	930

Bokondini Airport (IATA: BUI, ICAO: WAVB) is an airport in Bokondini, Tolikara Regency, Highland Papua, Indonesia.

== Airlines and destinations ==
Airlines	Destinations
Susi Air	Jayapura, Wamena
