= De Kroonduif =

- Founded: 14 July 1955
- Ceased operations: 1 January 1963 (absorbed into GIA)
- Hubs: Biak-Mokmer Airport
- Fleet size: DC-3 and Twin Pioneer
- Destinations: 19 (in 1958)
- Parent company: KLM
- Headquarters: Biak, Netherlands New Guinea

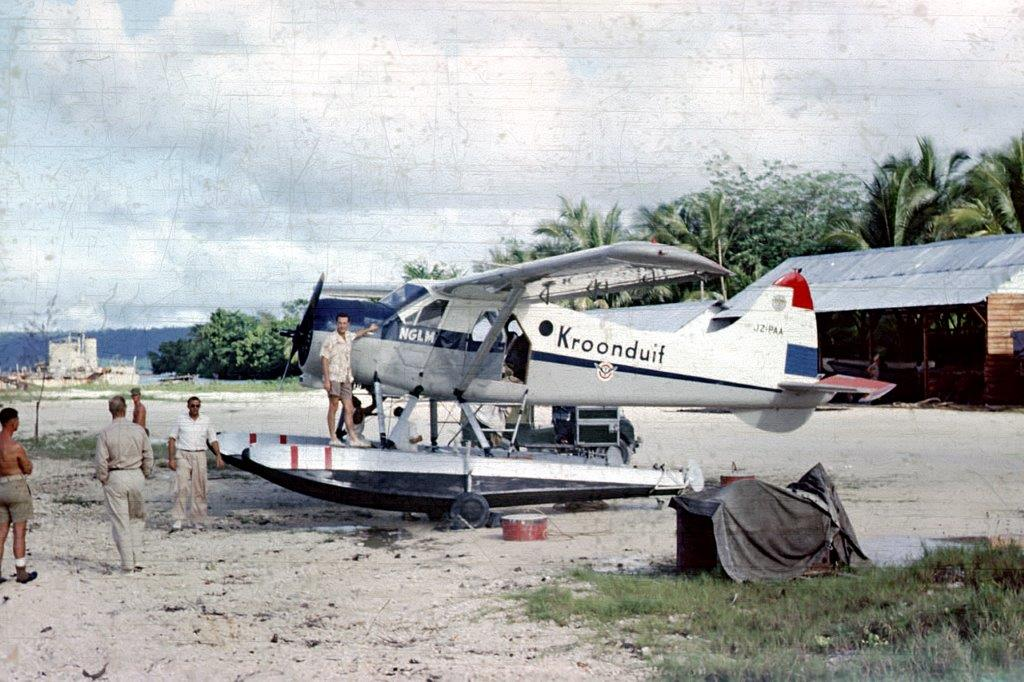
JZ-PAA

De Kroonduif, a former subsidiary of Dutch airline KLM, was the national carrier of Netherlands New Guinea between 1955 and 1963. The name 'kroonduif' is the Dutch term for the crowned pigeon endemic to New Guinea, which was assumed as the logo of the company.

== History ==
On 14 July 1955, the company Nederlands Nieuw Guinea Luchtvaart Maatschappij (NNGLM) was established as a subsidiary of Dutch airline KLM, to provide air services within the Dutch territory of Netherlands New Guinea. This new airline, operating under the name of De Kroonduif, was based at Biak, and operated several routes throughout the territory with two de Havilland Canada Beavers.

Later the fleet was also supplemented with Douglas DC-3 Dakotas and Twin Pioneers.

As Dutch New Guinea was being incorporated into Indonesian territory on 1 January 1963, the operations of De Kroonduif were absorbed by Indonesian airline Garuda Indonesian Airways, which shortly afterwards assigned them to Merpati Nusantara Airlines, a company that since 1978 was fully owned by Garuda.

== Destinations ==
According to the De Kroonduif timetable dated 1 December 1958, at the time the following destinations were served:

- Biak, Ajamaroe, Fak Fak, Hollandia, Kaimana, Kebar, Kokonao, Manawi, Manokwari, Merauke, Napan, Noemfoer, Ransiki, Sorong, Steenkool, Tanahmerah, Teminaboean, Wasior, Wisselmeren

== See also ==
- Merpati Nusantara destinations
- List of Garuda Indonesia destinations
