= List of defunct airlines of Indonesia =

This is a list of defunct airlines of Indonesia including the Dutch East Indies and Netherlands New Guinea.

Airline	Image	IATA	ICAO	Callsign	Commenced operations	Ceased operations	Notes
Adam Air		KI	DHI	ADAM SKY	2003	2008	AOC revoked after crash
Adi Wahana Angkasa Nusantara						2013	AOC revoked
Air Efata			EIJ	EFATA	2005	2006	Started operations on 9 January 2006. All aircraft repossessed mid-December 2006.
Air Maleo					2010	2015	
Air Paradise International		AD	PRZ	RADISAIR	2003	2005	
Air Regional		AR	ARI	AIREG	2001	2018	
Airfast Services Indonesia			AFE		1971	1981	Rebranded as Airfast Indonesia
Airmark Indonesia		AI	AIA	AIRMARK	1998	2010	AOC suspended
Angkasa Civil Air Transport			AFE		1969	1971	
Asia Avia Airlines			AVT	ASIAVIA	2003	2006	
Asia Avia Megatama						2008	Bankruptcy
Auvia Air			UVT	AUVIA	2004	2008	AOC suspended
Aviasi Upata Raksa Indonesia						2008	AOC suspended
Aviastar		MV	VIT	AVIASTAR	2007	2022	
Awair		QZ	AWQ	WAGON AIR	2000	2005	Rebranded as Indonesia AirAsia
Bali Air		JK	BLN	BIAR	1973	2005	Subsidiary of Bouraq Indonesia Airlines
Batavia Air		Y6	BTV	BATAVIA	2002	2013	Went bankrupt
Bayu Air Indonesia			BYU		2000	2003	
Bayu Indonesia		DD	BYU		1975	1990	Rebranded as Bayu Air Indonesia
Bouraq Indonesia Airlines		BO	BOU	BOURAQ	1970	2005	
Buay Air Service				BUAY		2009	
Caltex Indonesia					1970	1980	
Citra Air					1994	2000	
Daya Jasa Transindo Pratama						2009	AOC revoked
De Kroonduif					1955	1963	Subsidiary of KLM; absorbed into Garuda Indonesia
Dirgantara Air Service		AW	DIR	DIRGANTARA	1971	2009	
Eagle Transport Service						2009	AOC revoked
Efata Papua Airlines		W2	EIJ		2004	2004	Rebranded as Air Efata
Ekspres Air					1999	2005	Rebranded as Premiair (Indonesia)
Express Air		XN	XAR		2006	2012	Rebranded as Xpress Air
Fly Express		XN	XAR		2003	2006	Rebranded as Express Air
Garuda Indonesian Airways		GA	GIA		1950	1985	Rebranded as Garuda Indonesia
Golden Air						2009	AOC Revoked
GT Air		GT			1999	2007	Rebranded as Mimika Air
Indonesian Airlines		IO	IAA	INDO LINES	1999	2004	
Indonesian Airways					1949	1950	Rebranded as Garuda Indonesian Airways
Indonesia AirAsia X		XT	IDX	RED PHOENIX	2014	2019	
Janis Air Transport					2005	2009	Inactive
Jatayu Airlines		VJ	JTY	JATAYU	1998	2006	AOC revoked due to safety concerns
Kalimantan Air Service					2004	2011	AOC suspended
Kalstar Aviation		KD	KLS	KALSTAR	2000	2017	Suspended
Kaltim Airlines					2011	2013	Suspended
Kartika Airlines		3Y	KAE	KARTIKA	2001	2010	
KLM East Indies					1928	1942	Renamed/merged to KNILM
KLM Interinsulair Bedrijf					1947	1949	Subsidiary of KLM; renamed Garuda Indonesia
KNILM					1928	1947	
Layanan Air Kalimantan						2008	AOC revoked
Linus Airways			LAI	AIRLINUS	2008	2009	
Lorena Airlines					2007	2009	Never launched
Love Air Service						2009	Went bankrupt
Mandala Airlines		QH;RI	MDL	MANDALA	1969	2013	Rebranded as Tigerair Mandala
Manunggal Air Service			MNS	MANUNGGAL	1997	2015	
Megantara Air		9M	MKE	MEGANTARA	2007	2010	
Merpati Nusantara Airlines		MZ	MNA	MERPATI	1962	2014	
National Air Charter			NSR		1979	1996	
New Jatayu Air		JZ			2013	2015	
Nurman Avia			NIN	NURVINDO	1997	2007	
Nusantara Air Services					1970	1973	Renamed/merged to Bali Air
Nusantara Buana Air					2009	2011	AOC suspended after crash
Pacific Royale Airways		RY	PRQ	SKYRIDER	2011	2012	AOC revoked
Papua Indonesia Air System					2003	2008	AOC suspended
PD Prodexim				PRODEXIM		2009	Bankruptcy
Penas Air			PNS		2010	2012	
Pegasus Air Charter						2009	AOC revoked
Rajawali Air					1992	1999	Renamed/merged to Post Ekspres Prima
Riau Airlines		PK	RIU	RIAU AIR	2002	2012	
Republic Express Airlines		RH	RPH	PUBLIC EXPRESS	2001	2010	
Sabang Merauke Raya Air Charter (SMAC)			SMC	SAMER	1972	2011	AOC suspended after crash
Sempati Air		SG	SSR	SPIROW	1969	1998	
Seulawah Air Service						1972	Taken over by Mandala
Seulawah Nad Air			NAD	Seulawah	2002	2003	
Sky Aviation		SY	SYA		2010	2014	Suspended
Space Air					2011	2012	Rebranded as Batik Air
Star Air		5H	STQ	STAR	2001	2008	
Tigerair Mandala		RI	MDL		2013	2014	
Top Air			LKW		2004	2007	
Transair Buana					1998	2007	
Transindo					1990	2002	
Xpress Air		XN	XAR	XPRESS	2003	2021	Renamed/merged to Express Air
Zamrud Aviation Corporation		ZJ			1969	1982	Renamed/merged to Airfast Indonesia

== See also ==
- List of airlines of Indonesia
- List of airports in Indonesia
