= List of airlines of Indonesia =

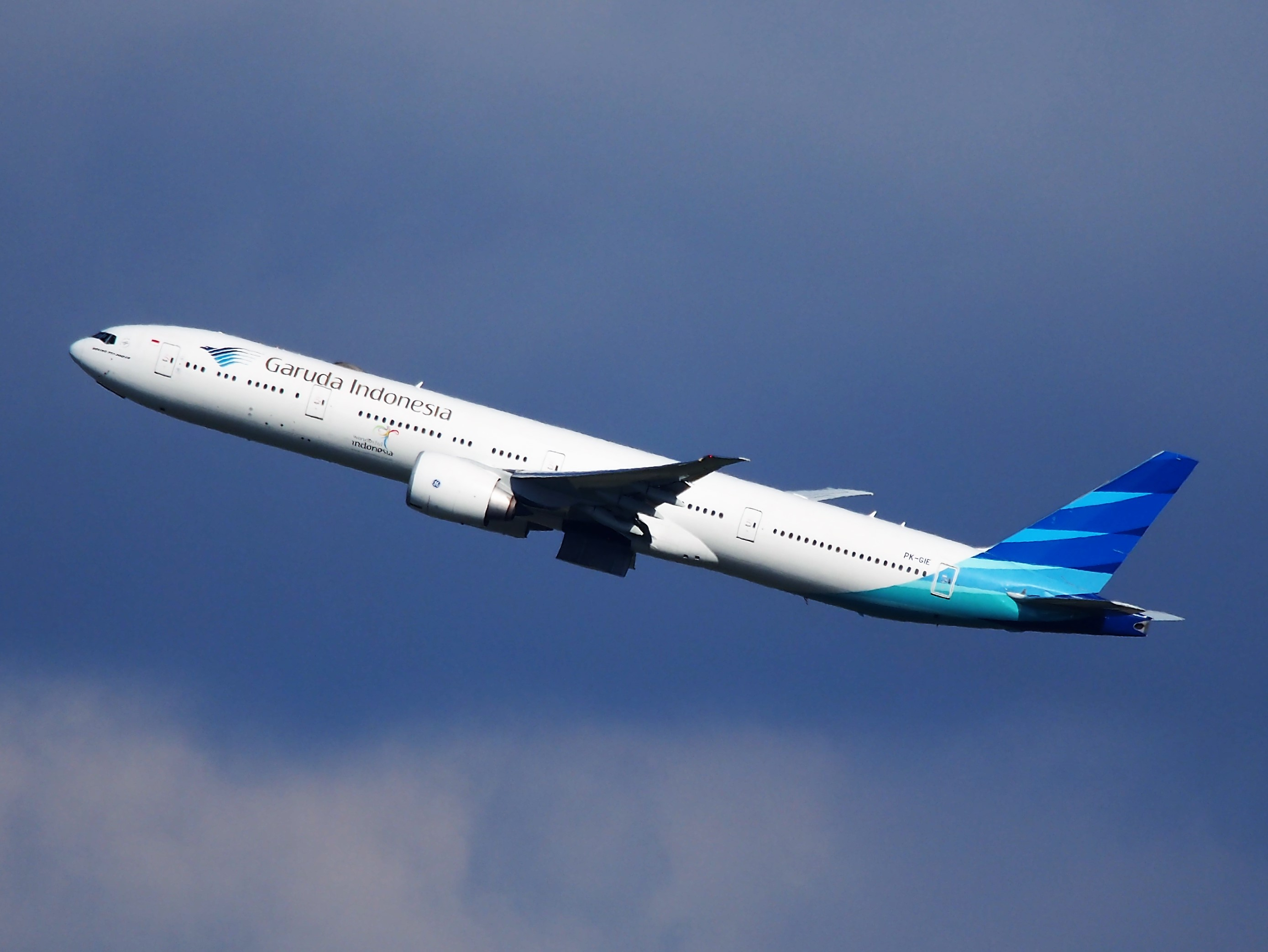
A Boeing 777 of Garuda Indonesia

Aviation market share in Indonesia (2021)
1. Lion Air 28.7 (28.4%)
2. Citilink 22.6 (22.3%)
3. Batik Air 21.8 (21.6%)
4. Garuda Indonesia 10.5 (10.4%)
5. Wings Air 7.9 (7.81%)
6. Sriwijaya Air 3.3 (3.26%)
7. Indonesia AirAsia 1.9 (1.88%)
8. BBN Airlines 1.9 (1.88%)
9. NAM Air 0.9 (0.89%)
10. Trigana Air 0.4 (0.40%)
11. Susi Air 0.03 (0.03%)
12. Others 1.19 (1.18%)

This is a list of airlines which have an Air Operator Certificate issued by the Civil Aviation Authority of Indonesia.

The following is a list of airlines operating in Indonesia:

== Aviation in Indonesia ==
There are two types of AOC in Indonesia, AOC 121 and AOC 135. AOC 121 is for commercial scheduled airlines with more than 30 passengers. AOC 135 is for commercial scheduled airlines with 30 or less passengers and chartered airlines. There are 22 AOC 121 holders and 32 AOC 135 holders.

By 12 January 2012, all Indonesian scheduled airlines have to operate with at least ten aircraft, and a minimum of five aircraft should be owned. The Ministry of Transport has the right to withdraw their operating certificate in case they do not comply with this regulation (Law Number 1, 2009 about air transport). The application of the regulation was postponed for one year, while in the postponed time the airlines should give a business plan and a contract letter for the leasing aircraft for at least one year ahead.

The largest low-cost carrier airlines include Lion Air, Indonesia AirAsia and Citilink, a subsidiary of Garuda Indonesia.

The safety-related ban on Indonesian airlines flying to European Union has been partially lifted since 2009 with Garuda Indonesia, Airfast Indonesia, Mandala Airlines, Express Transportasi Antarbenua, Indonesia AirAsia and Batavia Air being taken off the list. On 21 April 2011 the EU lifted the ban of Cardig Air, Republic Express, Asia Link and Air Maleo - all being cargo carriers. The ban had been imposed after a string of accidents.

On 14 June 2018, all Indonesian Airlines were removed from the list of air carriers banned in the EU.

There are three categories of On Time Performance (OTP) for commercial scheduled airlines in Indonesia (2017 average published by Indonesian Directorate General Of Civil Aviation):

- Green, more than 80 percent (the airlines in this category are NAM Air: 92.62 percent, Sriwijaya Air: 88.69 percent, Batik Air: 88.66 percent, Garuda Indonesia: 88.53 percent and Citilink: 88.33 percent)
- Yellow, 70 to 80 percent (Indonesia AirAsia: 75.94 percent, Susi Air: 72.65 percent, TransNusa: 71.36 percent and Lion Air: 71.32 percent)
- Red, below 70 percent (Wings Air: 65.47 percent and Trigana Air: 42.49 percent)

Since 1 January 2012, the airlines have to give a Rp300,000 ($22) voucher to each passenger as compensation for a delayed flight of more than four hours and the voucher should be able to be disbursed on that day or on the following day. Bad weather or operational and technical problems, such as refueling delays or a damaged runway are exempted from this requirement. For flights diverted to other destinations, the airlines have to make all necessary arrangements to get the passengers to their original destinations plus Rp.150,000 compensation. Any flight cancellations must be made seven days prior to a flight, and passengers will receive a full refund and cancellation within seven days of departure. The airlines have to pay compensation equal to the value of the ticket on top of the full refund. Batavia Air was the first airline with a delay more than four hours of Palangkaraya-Surabaya route due to operational problem on 2 January 2011. The airlines should pay a total of Rp42 million ($4,242) compensation to all passengers.

== Scheduled airlines ==
Airline	Image	IATA	ICAO	Callsign	Hub airport(s)	Fleet size	Notes
Batik Air		ID	BTK	BATIK	Soekarno–Hatta International Airport; Halim Perdanakusuma International Airport	72	Subsidiary and full service arm of Lion Air Group
Citilink		QG	CTV	SUPERGREEN	Juanda International Airport; Soekarno–Hatta International Airport; Halim Perdanakusuma International Airport	59	Subsidiary and LCC arm of Garuda Indonesia Group; AOC 121-046
FlyJaya		KS	FHS	SURYA	Halim Perdanakusuma International Airport; Adisutjipto Airport	2	AOC 121
Garuda Indonesia		GA	GIA	INDONESIA	Soekarno–Hatta International Airport; Ngurah Rai International Airport; Sultan Hasanuddin International Airport	81	National airline AOC 121
Indonesia AirAsia		QZ	AWQ	WAGON AIR	Soekarno–Hatta International Airport; Ngurah Rai International Airport	32	AOC 121
Lion Air		JT	LNI	LION INTER	Soekarno–Hatta International Airport; Juanda International Airport; Hang Nadim International Airport; Sultan Hasanuddin International Airport	109	AOC 121
NAM Air		IN	LKN	NAM	Soekarno–Hatta International Airport	11	Subsidiary and regional arm of Sriwijaya Air
Pelita Air		IP	PAS	PELITA	Soekarno–Hatta International Airport; Pondok Cabe Airport	23	AOC 121; AOC 135
Sriwijaya Air		SJ	SJY	SRIWIJAYA	Soekarno–Hatta International Airport; Sultan Hasanuddin International Airport	6	AOC 121
Super Air Jet		IU	SJV	PROSPER	Soekarno–Hatta International Airport	61	AOC 121-060
Susi Air		SI	SQS	SKY QUEEN	Cijulang Nusawiru Airport; Halim Perdanakusuma International Airport; Kualanamu International Airport; Aji Pangeran Tumenggung Pranoto International Airport; El Tari Airport	49	AOC 135
TransNusa		8B	TNU	TRANSNUSA	Soekarno-Hatta International Airport	8	
Trigana Air		IL	TGN	TRIGANA	Soekarno–Hatta International Airport	16	AOC 121
Wings Air		IW	WON	WINGS ABADI	Juanda International Airport	73	LCC subsidiary and regional arm of Lion Air Group; AOC 121

== Charter airlines ==
Airline	Image	IATA	ICAO	Callsign	Hub airport(s)	Notes
Airfast Indonesia		FS	AFE	AIRFAST	Soekarno–Hatta International Airport	AOC 135
BBN Airlines		7B	BBL	BLUE BIRD NORDIC	Soekarno–Hatta International Airport	
EastIndo			ESD	EASTINDO	Halim Perdanakusuma International Airport	AOC 135
Flash Jet					Halim Perdanakusuma International Airport	
Indonesia Air Transport		I8	IDA	INTRA	Halim Perdanakusuma International Airport	
Jhonlin Air Transport			JLB	JHONLIN	Syamsudin Noor International Airport	
Mukhtara Air			MUH	MUKHTARA AIR	Soekarno–Hatta International Airport	
Premiair			ETA	Express Transportasi Antarbenua	Halim Perdanakusuma International Airport	AOC 135
Travira Air		TR	TVV	PARAMITA	Halim Perdanakusuma International Airport	
Travya			CEO	JETSET	Halim Perdanakusuma International Airport	

== Cargo airlines ==
Airline	Image	IATA	ICAO	Callsign	Fleet size	Hub airport	Notes
Aero Nusantara Cargo					1	Halim Perdanakusuma International Airport	
AirNesia Royal Cargo					2	Soekarno–Hatta International Airport	
Asia Cargo Airlines		GY	TMG	TRILINES	10	Soekarno–Hatta International Airport	AOC 121
Cardig Air		8F	CAD	CARDIG AIR	3	Soekarno–Hatta International Airport	AOC 121
Express Cargo Airlines			JDE		2	Soekarno–Hatta International Airport	
Garuda Cargo		GA	GIA	INDONESIA CARGO	3	Soekarno–Hatta International Airport	
J&T Express					1	Soekarno–Hatta International Airport	
Jayawijaya Dirgantara			JWD	WIJAYA AIR	3	Halim Perdanakusuma International Airport	
JNE Express					1	Soekarno–Hatta International Airport	
My Indo Airlines		2Y	MYU	MYINDO	9	Soekarno–Hatta International Airport	AOC 121
Raindo United Services		R0	RBF	RAINDO	2	Soekarno–Hatta International Airport	AOC 075
Republic Express Airlines		RH	RPH	PUBLIC EXPRESS	3	Soekarno–Hatta International Airport	
RGA-Black Stone Airlines			RGM	BLACK STONE	2	Soekarno–Hatta International Airport	
Rimbun Air		RI	OEY	RIMBUN AIR	4	Soekarno–Hatta International Airport	

== Other airlines ==
- Air Born Indonesia
- Air Maleo
- Amman Mineral
- Asco Nusa Air
- Aviastar Mandiri
- CT Corp
- Dabi Air Nusantara
- Deraya Air Taxi
- Derazone Air Service
- Dirgantara Air Service
- Eastindo
- Ekspres Transportasi Antarbenua
- Gatari Air Service
- IMIP Aviation
- Intan Angkasa Air Service
- Kura-Kura Aviation
- Mimika Air
- Mission Aviation Fellowship
- Megantara Air
- National Utility Helicopter
- Nurman Avia
- Nusantara Buana Air
- Nyaman Air
- Pegasus Air Services
- Penerbangan Angkasa Semesta
- Premiair
- PT Freeport Indonesia
- Pura Wisata Baruna
- Sabang Merauke Raya Air Charter
- SAM Air
- Sayap Garuda Indah
- SLL Resources
- Smart Aviation
- Survai Udara Penas (Persero)
- Transwisata Prima Aviation

== See also ==
- List of airlines
- List of air carriers banned in the European Union
- List of defunct airlines of Asia
- List of defunct airlines of Indonesia
