= Karimunjawa long-tailed macaque =

Conservation status
- Critically Endangered (IUCN 3.1)

Scientific classification
- Kingdom: Animalia
- Phylum: Chordata
- Class: Mammalia
- Order: Primates
- Family: Cercopithecidae
- Genus: Macaca
- Species: M. fascicularis
- Subspecies: M. f. karimondjawae

Trinomial name
- Macaca fascicularis karimondjawae Sody, 1949
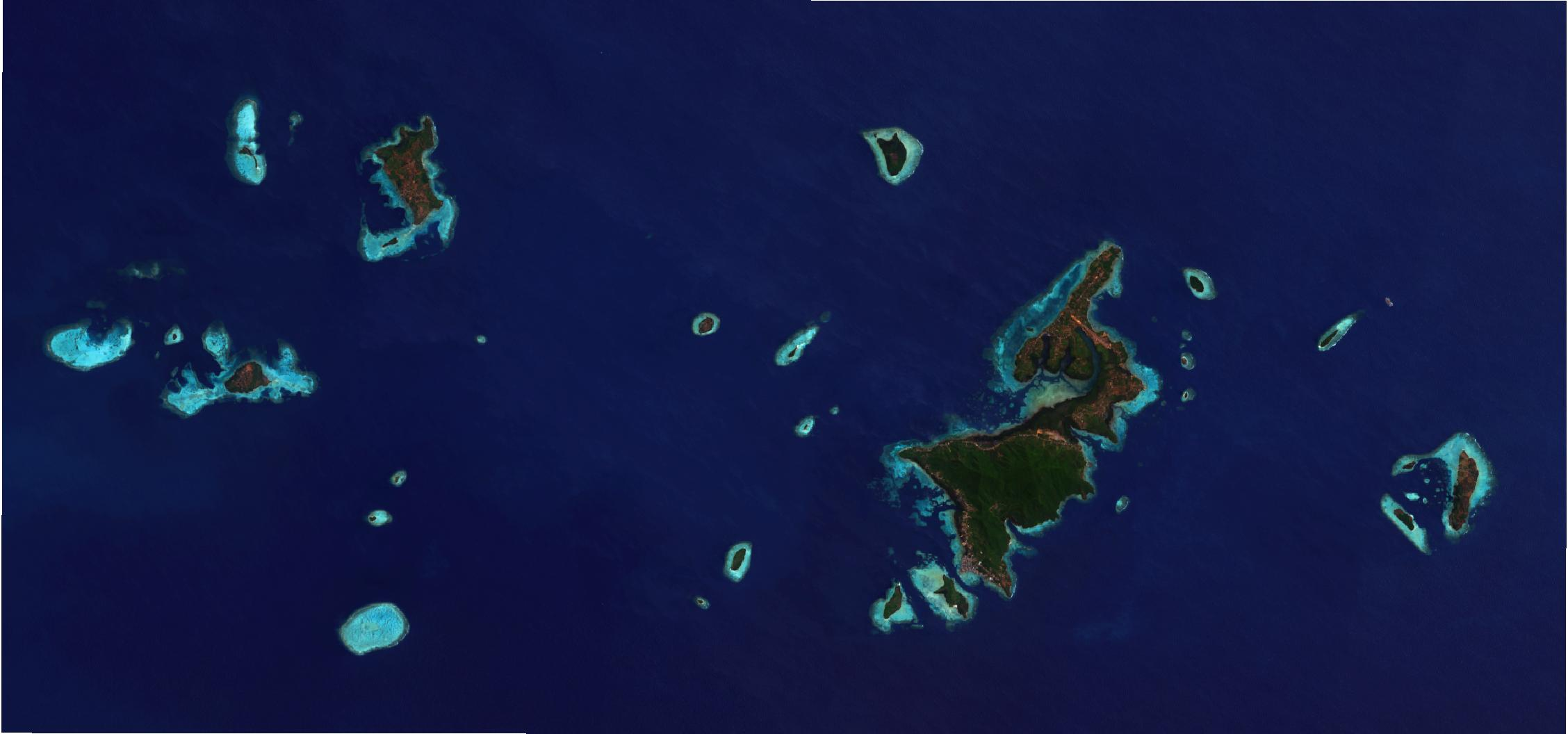
- Karimunjawa archipelago, north of Java, Indonesia

Subspecies of primate

The Karimunjawa long-tailed macaque (Macaca fascicularis karimondjawae) is one of the seven recognized island subspecies of crab-eating macaques (Macaca fascicularis). This subspecies is endemic to two islands in the Karimunjawa archipelago (i.e., Karimunjawa and Kemujan islands), located about 80 km (50 mi) north of Java, Indonesia. The Karimunjawa long-tailed macaque subspecies is distinguished by its dark dorsal pelage. Due to a decline in habitat and human-macaque conflict issues this subspecies is considered Critically Endangered by the International Union for Conservation of Nature (IUCN).

== Etymology ==
Macaca fascicularis karimondjawae is commonly known as the Karimunjawa long-tailed macaque, referring to the main island on which they occur. In Indonesia, this species is referred to as kera or monyet ekor panjang. M. f. karimondjawae was first described as a subspecies of Macaca irus (I. Geoffroy Saint-Hilaire, 1826), a synonym for Macaca fascicularis (Raffles, 1821).

== Characteristics and morphology ==
During the last glacial maximum 18 thousand years ago, sea levels were lower than present allowing Macaca fascicularis to disperse over dry land to what are now shallow-water islands (including the Karimunjawa archipelago). Between 18 and 5 thousand years ago, sea levels rose to present levels and populations became isolated. After isolation, the long-tailed macaque populations on shallow-water fringing-islands tended to become darker in color, with the M.f. karimondjawae population having the darkest pelage of shallow-water fringing-island populations. Their dorsal pelage tends to be dark grayish brown with pale yellowish annulations of dorsal hair and the crown tends to have a blackish wash.

== Population ==
At present, there is no published data on the size of the long-tailed macaque population on Kemujan island, but they are reported to be there and have been estimated to be between 30-50 individuals.

In 2008, a population survey of the long-tailed macaques was conducted on Karimunjawa island. The population was estimated at 269 individuals and found in three sites (i.e., Kemloko, Legon Lele, and Nyamplungan). At this time, the total population of M.f. karimondjawae was estimated to be less than 500 individuals.

Another population survey was conducted in 2017 by the Karimunjawa National Park staff and the population was estimated at 192 individuals in the same three locations as the 2008 assessment.

== Distribution ==
The Karimunjawa long-tailed macaque is only found on Karimunjawa and Kemujan islands, which are shallow-water islands that are part of the Karimunjawa archipelago, north of Java, Indonesia. Karimunjawa and Kemujan islands are connected by a short land bridge and the extent of occurrence was calculated as 27 km^{2} (10 sq mi). On these islands, long-tailed macaques are found in mangrove forests and coastal and lowland tropical rainforest.

Assessments indicate that the area of occupancy (AOO) of the Karimunjawa long-tailed macaque is shrinking; in 2008, the AOO was estimated to be 23.47 km^{2} (9.06 sq mi), yet in 2017 the AOO was estimated at 12.86 km^{2} (4.97 sq mi).

== Behavior ==
To preface, little information is written on the specific behavior of this particular subspecies of long-tailed macaque, long-tailed macaque subspecies share a lot of similarities, but they do exhibit quite a bit of variation as well. Long-tailed macaques live in matrilineal groups. The 2008 population survey of M.f. karimondjawae counted 23 groups and a total of 269 individuals. Because the 2017 survey indicated a decrease in population, the number of groups may have also decreased. Long-tailed macaque groups size varies considerably (<10>85), but smaller groups are found in mangrove forests, like those where the Karimunjawa subspecies exist. Groups often exhibit female philopatry with males emigrating from natal group at puberty. In long-tailed macaques, overlap of home ranges of adjacent groups is usually slight, but on smaller islands group overlap can be extensive. Long-tailed macaques living near water are known to be accomplished swimmers.

== Threats ==
Significant levels of human-macaque conflict have been reported on Karimunjawa island. The human inhabitants on the island are mainly farmers and fisherman, they depend on limited natural resources on the island which puts them in direct competition with the macaques.

== Conservation ==
In 2022, the Karimunjawa long-tailed macaque was assessed as Critically Endangered on the IUCN's Red List. This assessment was based on the fact that this subspecies is found only in a single location (as defined by the IUCN) and faces a decline in habitat quality, in addition to significant human-macaque conflict issues. From the 2017 population assessment, the total population is estimated to be less than 250 individuals. The previous IUCN listing for this subspecies in 2008 and 2020 was Data Deficient.
