= EIJ =

EIJ may refer to:

- Air Efata, an Indonesian airline
- Egyptian Islamic Jihad
- Eritrean Islamic Jihad
