= Flight 514 =

Flight 514 may refer to:

- American Airlines Flight 514, crashed on 15 August 1959
- TWA Flight 514, crashed on 1 December 1974
- Mimika Air Flight 514, crashed on 17 April 2009
- Alrosa Flight 514, crash-landed on 7 September 2010
