= KWB =

KWB could refer to:

- Dewadaru Airport, Karimunjawa, Indonesia, IATA code
- Kew Bridge railway station, London, England, National Rail code
- KWB, former branding for a cable-only service of KAUZ-TV in Wichita Falls, Texas
