= Ilaga (disambiguation) =

Ilaga is a Christian extremist paramilitary group based in southern Philippines.

Ilaga may also refer to:

- Ilaga, Indonesia, a small town and a farming valley in Papua, Indonesia

== See also ==
- Ilagan, city in the Philippines
- Ila, Georgia (Ila, GA), city in U.S.
- Llagas Creek
