= Nurman =

Nurman is a Turkic surname that may refer to the following notable people:

- Alua Nurman (born 2007), Kazakhstani chess Grandmaster
- Kadir Nurman (c.1933–2013), Turkish restaurateur

== See also ==
- Nurman Avia, defunct airline based in Indonesia
