= PremiAir =

PremiAir may refer to:

- Air Premia, a South Korean airline
- Kendell Airlines, an Australian regional airline 1967–2001
- MyTravel Airways, a British airline 1990–2008
- Premiair, an Indonesian airline
- PremiAir Aviation Services, a defunct UK airline formerly based at Blackbushe Airport, Yateley, Hampshire, England
- PremiAir Racing, an Australian motor racing team
- Sunclass Airlines, a Danish charter airline
