= Lorena (bus company) =

Organization

PT Eka Sari Lorena Transport Tbk
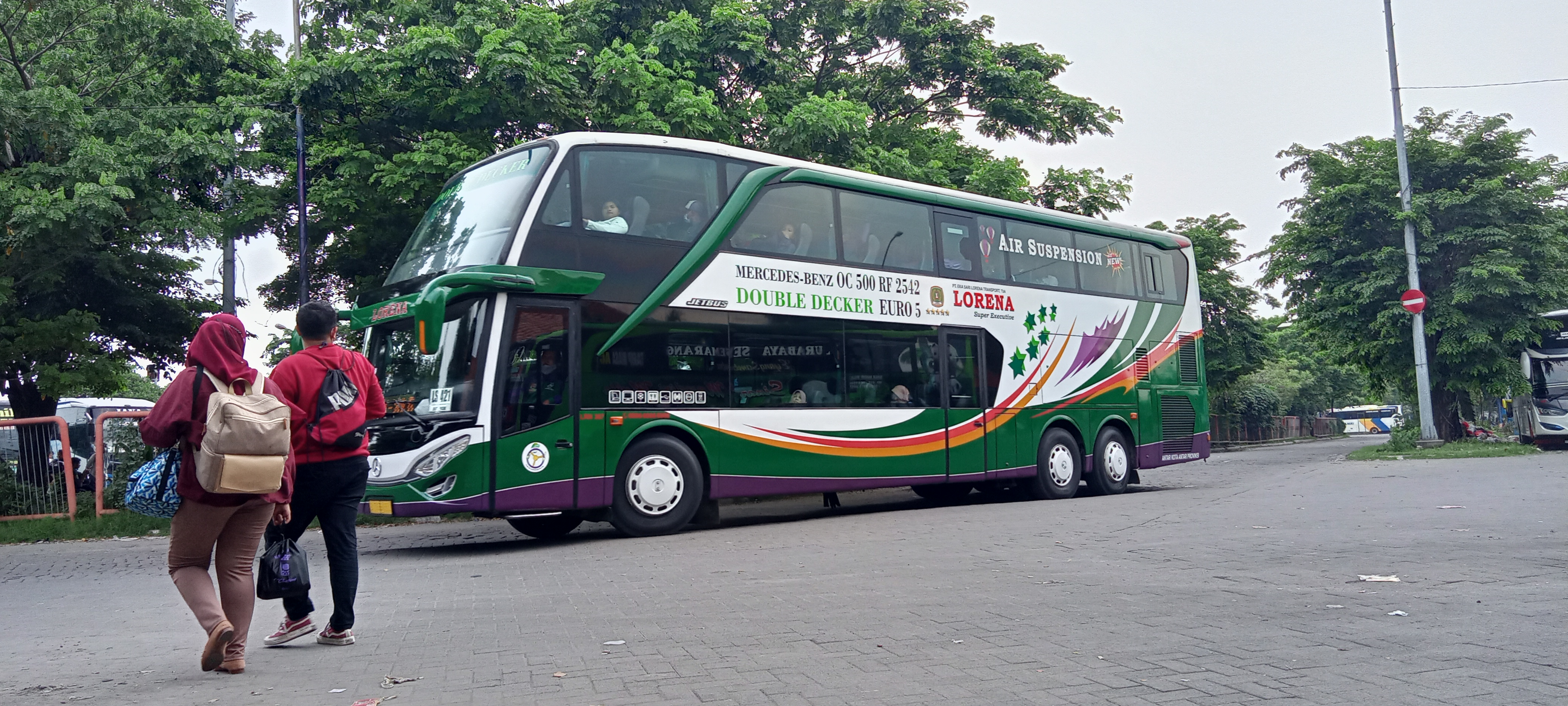
- Lorena's inter-city double decker bus that serves the route between Jakarta and Malang
- Parent: Lorena Holding Company
- Founded: 1970; 56 years ago
- Commenced operation: 1973
- Headquarters: Jl. K.H. Hasyim Ashari No. 15 C, Central Jakarta, Indonesia
- Service area: Sumatra, Java and Bali
- Service type: Intercity bus service
- Alliance: Karina Transport
- Stations: tes
- Depots: Jl. Tajur No.106, Bogor, West Java
- Fleet: 500
- Fuel type: Diesel fuel
- CEO: Eka Sari Lorena Soerbakti
- Website: lorena-transport.com

PT Eka Sari Lorena Transport Tbk is a publicly traded (IDX: LRNA) bus company providing inter-city transport buses with long distance routes in Indonesia.

== History ==
PO Lorena was founded by GT Soerbakti in 1970 under the name CV Lorena. At the beginning of its establishment CV Lorena only had 2 bus fleets with short distance routes, namely Bogor - Jakarta PP. Long distance routes were opened by PO Lorena in 1984 starting with the route Jakarta - Surabaya PP, followed by other cities on Java, Madura, Bali and Sumatra.

== Services ==
=== Inter-city buses between provinces ===
PO Lorena currently has long-distance routes between Bali, Java and Sumatra, being served by a 500 bus fleet with executive and business classes on single or level bus. The routes are:

Island	Route
Java
Java	Bogor – Banyuwangi
Java	Bogor – Ponorogo
Java	Bogor – Bobotsari
Java - Sumatra
Java - Sumatra	Bogor – Jambi
Java - Sumatra	Bogor – Padang
Java - Sumatra	Bogor – Palembang
Java - Sumatra	Bogor – Pekanbaru
Java - Sumatra	Bogor – Prabumulih
Java - Sumatra	Bandung – Pekanbaru
Java - Sumatra	Bandung – Bukittinggi
Java - Sumatra	Kotabumi – Banyuwangi
Java - Sumatra	Tulang Bawang – Malang
Java - Sumatra	Pringsewu – Blitar
Java - Bali	Bogor - Denpasar
Java - Madura	Bogor - Sumenep

Note: All routes are round trip.

=== Bus Rapid Transit ===
PO Lorena was an operator of TransJakarta Bus Rapid Transit from 2008 to 2018. PO Lorena had a fleet of 47 buses painted grey, consisting of 13 articulated locally made Komodo buses operated in Corridor 5 and 34 single Hino buses operated in Corridor 7. All buses were fueled with CNG.

== Gallery ==
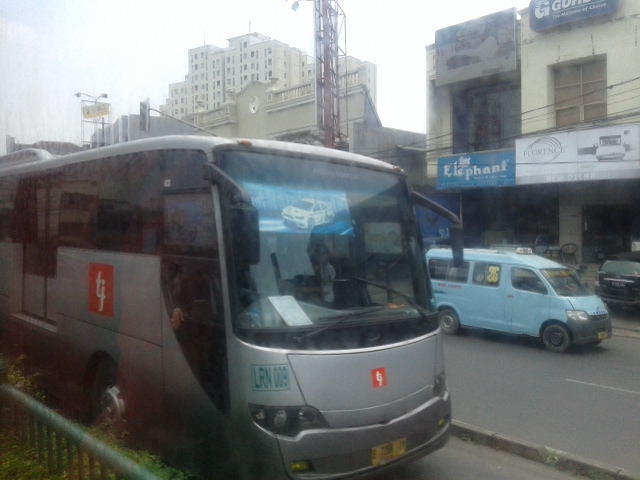
Lorena Hino bus operated as TransJakarta

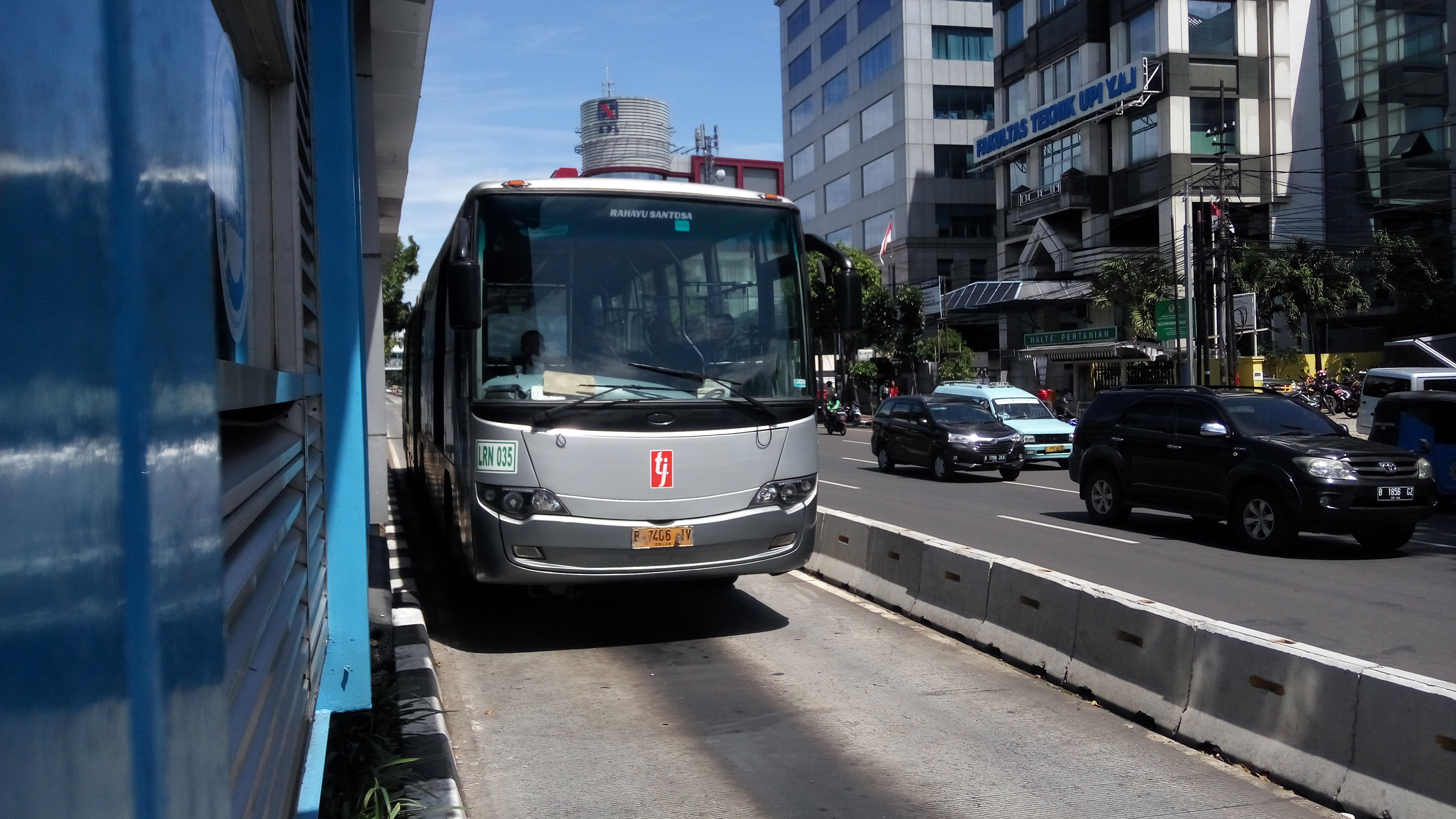
Lorena Komodo articulated bus

== See also ==
- Lorena Airlines
