= Air Regional =

Indonesian airline

IATA	ICAO	Call sign
AR	ARI	AIREG
- Founded: 2001
- Ceased operations: 2018
- AOC #: 135 # 027
- Operating bases: Sorong Airport; Nabire Airport
- Secondary hubs: Sentani Airport Wamena Airport Manokwari Airport Merauke Airport Timika Airport Kaimana Airport Fakfak Airport Biak Airport Serui Airport Raja Ampat Airport
- Fleet size: 7
- Destinations: 32
- Headquarters: Jakarta, Indonesia
- Website: www.airregional.flights

Air Regional was an airline based in Jakarta, Indonesia. It operated domestic and international air charter services in the Papua region, with principal bases in 2018 focussing at Sorong Airport (SOQ), serving the West Central Region and Nabire Airport (NBX) to handle the East Central Region.

== History ==
The airline was established on 13 August 2001, and began operations under Air Regional AOC 135 #027 on 16 October 2002. It was founded and is owned by Captain Pinky Firmansyah, President and Chief Executive Officer of the company. It had 50 employees as of March 2007.

=== Destinations ===
- Raja Ampat
- Sorong
- Fak Fak
- Kaimana
- Timika
- Faowi
- Beoga
- Magoda
- Apowo
- Kegata
- Bugalaga
- Komopa
- Bilai
- Timepa
- Modio
- Jila
- Agats
- Ewer
- Mapenduma
- Angguruk
- Wagethe
- Serui
- Ilaga
- Manokwari
- Zugapa
- Silimo
- Ninia
- Obano
- Mulia
- Ilu
- Pogapa
- Borme
- Kuyawagi
- Bokondini
- Biak
- Serui
- Elilim
- Yahukimo
- Abmisibil
- Sumtamon
- Borme
- Apalapsili
- Korupun
- Kenyam
- Timipa
- Epouto
- Tiom
- Nduga
- Modio
- Enarotali
- Holuwon
- Tanah Merah
- Kimaam
- Merauke

== Fleet ==
The Air Regional fleet includes the following aircraft as of March 2007:

- 3 De Havilland Canada DHC-6 Twin Otter Series 300 Papua, Indonesia

Air Regional will include following aircraft/s in its additional fleet plan (as of December 2018):

- 2 (DHC6) installed with Wipaire Amphibian Floats equipped with SAR and EMS Air Ambulance
- 1 Airbus AS350B3 helicopter (AS350B3) equipped with SAR and EMS Air Ambulance
