= Mokoni =

- Village
- Location in Western New Guinea and Indonesia Mokoni (Indonesia)
- Coordinates: 3°56′2.8068″S 138°16′7.3416″E
- Country: Indonesia
- Province: Highland Papua
- Regency: Lanny Jaya Regency
- District: Tiom District
- Elevation: 11,007 ft (3,355 m)

Population (2010)
  - Total: 1,655
- Time zone: UTC+9 (Indonesia Eastern Standard Time)

Mokoni is a village in Tiom district, Lanny Jaya Regency in Highland Papua province, Indonesia. Its population is 1655.

== Climate ==
Mokoni has a cold subtropical highland climate (Cfb) with heavy rainfall year-round.

Climate data for Mokoni
Month	Jan	Feb	Mar	Apr	May	Jun	Jul	Aug	Sep	Oct	Nov	Dec	Year
Mean daily maximum °C (°F)	17.2 (63.0)	17.2 (63.0)	16.6 (61.9)	16.1 (61.0)	15.3 (59.5)	14.4 (57.9)	13.6 (56.5)	13.5 (56.3)	14.7 (58.5)	16.4 (61.5)	17.0 (62.6)	17.2 (63.0)	15.8 (60.4)
Daily mean °C (°F)	11.2 (52.2)	11.3 (52.3)	11.1 (52.0)	10.8 (51.4)	10.4 (50.7)	9.8 (49.6)	9.3 (48.7)	9.1 (48.4)	9.5 (49.1)	10.5 (50.9)	10.8 (51.4)	11.3 (52.3)	10.4 (50.8)
Mean daily minimum °C (°F)	5.3 (41.5)	5.4 (41.7)	5.7 (42.3)	5.6 (42.1)	5.6 (42.1)	5.3 (41.5)	5.1 (41.2)	4.7 (40.5)	4.4 (39.9)	4.7 (40.5)	4.6 (40.3)	5.4 (41.7)	5.2 (41.3)
Average rainfall mm (inches)	300 (11.8)	327 (12.9)	304 (12.0)	288 (11.3)	282 (11.1)	278 (10.9)	283 (11.1)	270 (10.6)	264 (10.4)	284 (11.2)	260 (10.2)	288 (11.3)	3,428 (134.8)
Source: Climate-Data.org
