= Airfast Indonesia =

Indonesian airline

| IATA | ICAO | Call sign |
|---|---|---|
| FS | AFE | AIRFAST |
- Founded: 7 July 1971; 55 years ago
- Hubs: Soekarno–Hatta International Airport
- Fleet size: 14
- Destinations: 12
- Headquarters: Tangerang, Indonesia
- Website: www.airfastindonesia.com

PT. Airfast Indonesia is an air carrier based in Tangerang, Indonesia in Greater Jakarta. It specialises in contract operations, aviation management services and charter passenger and cargo services to the oil, mining and construction industries in Indonesia and other countries in the area. It is also involved in aerial mapping, survey flights, heli-logging and medical evacuation services. Its main base is Soekarno–Hatta International Airport, Jakarta. Airfast Indonesia is listed in Category 1 by Indonesian Civil Aviation Authority for airline safety quality. In 2009 Airfast Indonesia was one of five airlines taken off a blacklist of airlines not allowed in European airspace due to safety concerns.

== History ==
The airline was established and started operations in 1971. It was established to provide helicopters and fixed-wing aircraft to the oil exploration industry in Indonesia, initially as an Australian-Indonesian joint venture, but evolved into a fully Indonesian-owned and operated company in 1982 when it acquired Zamrud Aviation Corporation. It was owned by Frank Reuneker (53%) and other shareholders (47%).

== Services ==
- Helicopter services include onshore and offshore passenger transport, medical evacuation flights, internal and external load transport, drilling rig moves, construction support and aerial survey work.
- Fixed-wing services include passenger and cargo charters, medical evacuation flights, non-scheduled airline operations and aerial survey work.

== Destinations ==
| Country | City | Airport | Notes | Refs |
|---|---|---|---|---|
| Indonesia | Surabaya | Juanda International Airport | | |
| Indonesia | Makassar | Sultan Hasanuddin International Airport | | |
| Indonesia | Solo | Adisoemarmo International Airport | | |
| Indonesia | Timika | Mozes Kilangin Airport | | |
| Indonesia | Bawean | Harun Thohir Airport | | |
| Indonesia | Manado | Sam Ratulangi International Airport | | |
| Indonesia | Kupang | El Tari Airport | | |
| Indonesia | Ambon | Pattimura Airport | | |
| Indonesia | Karimunjawa | Dewadaru Airport | | |
| Indonesia | Kotabaru | Mekar Putih Airport | | |
| Indonesia | Banjarmasin | Syamsudin Noor International Airport | | |
| Indonesia | Banda Aceh | Sultan Iskandar Muda International Airport | Cargo | |
| Indonesia | Medan | Kualanamu International Airport | Cargo | |
| Indonesia | Tanjung | Warukin Airport | | |

== Fleet ==
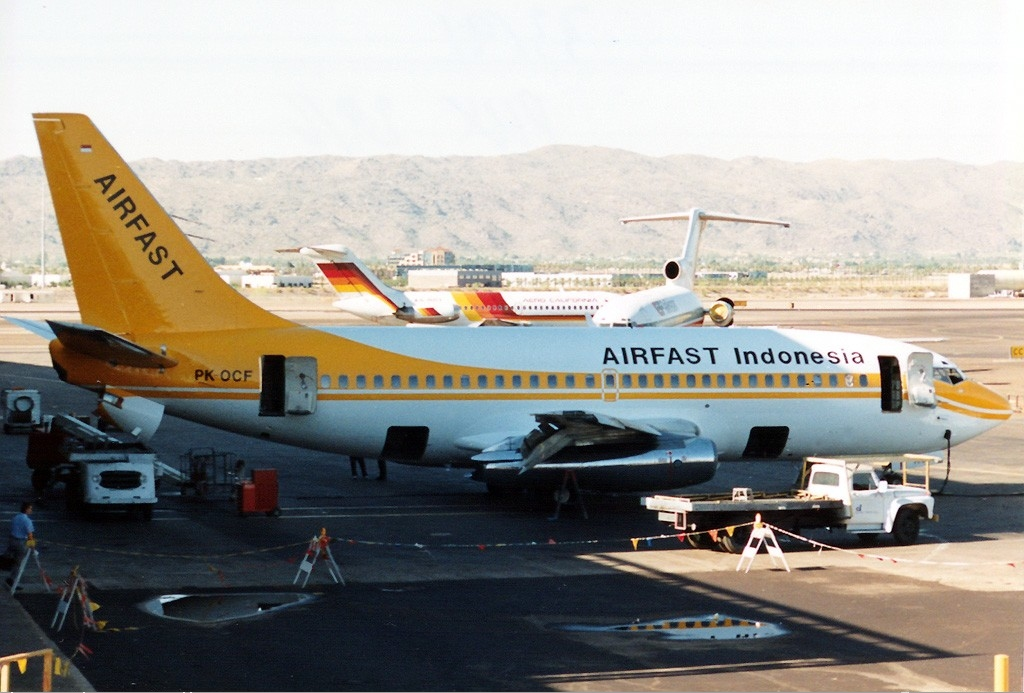
Airfast Boeing 737-247 PK-OCF in Sky Harbor International Airport in Phoenix, Arizona. The aircraft was reportedly scrapped in Kuala Lumpur in 2000.

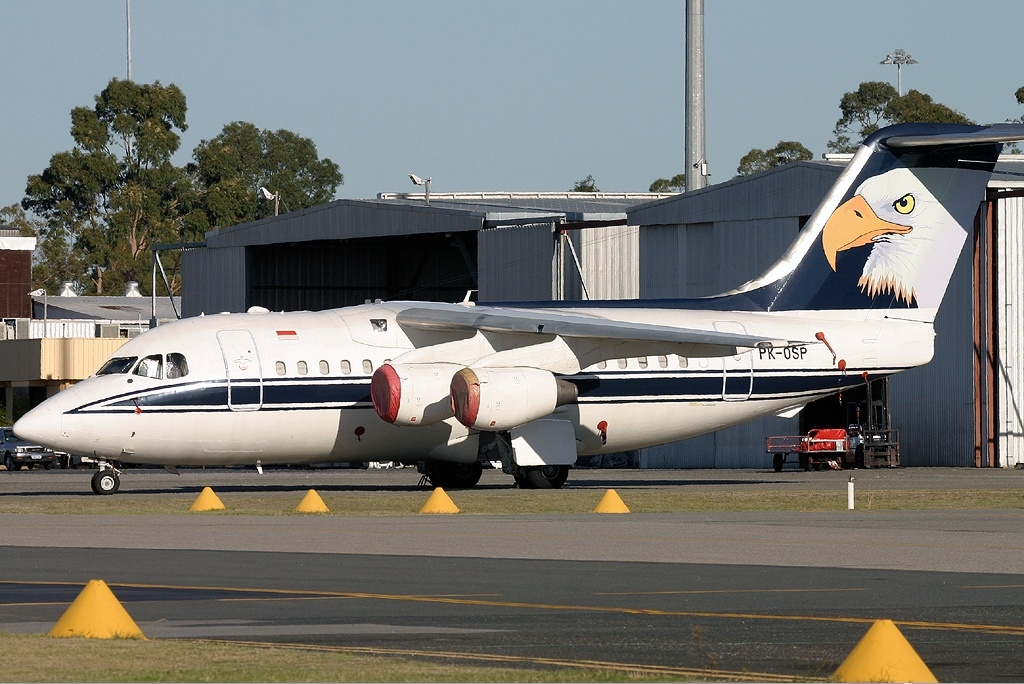
Airfast BAe 146 at Perth Airport (2004)

As of January 2025 the Airfast Indonesia fleet includes the following aircraft:

Airfast Indonesia fleet
| Aircraft | In service | Orders | Passengers | Notes |
|---|---|---|---|---|
| Eurocopter AS350 | 1 | — | 5 | |
| Bell 412 | 2 | — | 12 | |
| Mil Mi-171 | 2 | — | 29 | |
| Boeing 737 MAX 8 | 2 | — | 172/198 | As of July 2026 |
| de Havilland Canada DHC-6-300 Twin Otter | 3 | — | 12 | As of July 2026 |
| de Havilland Canada DHC-6-400 Twin Otter | 5 | — | 19 | As of July 2026 |
| Total | 15 | — | | |

== Accidents and incidents ==
- On 28 April 1981, Douglas C-47A PK-OBK crashed on approach to Simpang Tiga Airport, Pekanbaru, whilst on a non-scheduled passenger flight. Nine of the 17 people on board were killed.
- On 15 August 1984, Douglas C-47A PK-OBC crashed into a mountain near Wamena. Two of the three people on board were killed.
- On 25 January 1990, a Hawker Siddeley HS 748 registered PK-OBW struck Mount Rinjani during a diversion caused by bad weather, killing all 19 people on board.
- On 16 March 2012, a Eurocopter AS350B3 registered PK-ODA carrying 3 people slammed into a cliff while flying over Papua. Everyone on board, including the New Zealand pilot, were killed instantly in the crash. The crash was categorized as CFIT.
