= Guninggame =

- Village
- Location in Highland Papua and Indonesia Guninggame (Indonesia)
- Coordinates: 3°55′35.3244″S 138°18′3.4308″E
- Country: Indonesia
- Province: Highland Papua
- Regency: Lanny Jaya Regency
- District: Tiom District
- Elevation: 9,450 ft (2,880 m)

Population (2010)
  - Total: 885
- Time zone: UTC+9 (Indonesia Eastern Standard Time)

Guninggame is a village in Tiom district, Lanny Jaya Regency in Highland Papua province, Indonesia. Its population is 885.

== Climate ==
Guninggame has a cold subtropical highland climate (Cfb) with heavy rainfall year-round.

Climate data for Guninggame
Month	Jan	Feb	Mar	Apr	May	Jun	Jul	Aug	Sep	Oct	Nov	Dec	Year
Mean daily maximum °C (°F)	19.6 (67.3)	19.5 (67.1)	19.1 (66.4)	18.7 (65.7)	18.1 (64.6)	17.2 (63.0)	16.5 (61.7)	16.4 (61.5)	17.5 (63.5)	18.9 (66.0)	19.4 (66.9)	19.5 (67.1)	18.4 (65.1)
Daily mean °C (°F)	13.7 (56.7)	13.7 (56.7)	13.7 (56.7)	13.4 (56.1)	13.1 (55.6)	12.5 (54.5)	12.0 (53.6)	11.8 (53.2)	12.2 (54.0)	13.1 (55.6)	13.3 (55.9)	13.7 (56.7)	13.0 (55.4)
Mean daily minimum °C (°F)	7.8 (46.0)	7.9 (46.2)	8.3 (46.9)	8.1 (46.6)	8.1 (46.6)	7.8 (46.0)	7.5 (45.5)	7.2 (45.0)	7.0 (44.6)	7.3 (45.1)	7.2 (45.0)	7.9 (46.2)	7.7 (45.8)
Average precipitation mm (inches)	277 (10.9)	304 (12.0)	287 (11.3)	268 (10.6)	255 (10.0)	247 (9.7)	250 (9.8)	244 (9.6)	240 (9.4)	258 (10.2)	233 (9.2)	261 (10.3)	3,124 (123)
Source: Climate-Data.org
