= Papua Indonesia Air System =

Cargo airline of Indonesia

IATA	ICAO	Call sign
-	-	-
- Founded: 2003
- Commenced operations: 1 February 2003
- Ceased operations: 2006
- Destinations: Jayapura and Wamena
- Headquarters: Biak, Papua, Indonesia

Papua Indonesia Air System was a cargo airline based in Biak, Papua, Indonesia. It was established in 2003 and started operations on 1 February 2003 and operated a cargo service between Jayapura and Wamena.

== Future Destinations ==
- Karawang - Karawang International Airport
- Tasikmalaya - Tasikmalaya Airport
- Yahukimo - Nop Goliat Dekai Airport
