= Raindo United Services =

Cargo airline of Indonesia

IATA	ICAO	Call sign
R0	RBF	Raindo
- Founded: 13 December 2022; 3 years ago
- Commenced operations: January 2024; 2 years ago
- AOC #: 075
- Fleet size: 2
- Destinations: 10
- Headquarters: Indonesia
- Key people: Raindo United Services

Raindo United Services was a start-up cargo airline based in Indonesia. Founded on 13 December 2022, the airline received an initial investment of $USD 100 million. The airline planned to launch services by August 2023 on both domestic and international routes to neighboring cities using a fleet of Boeing 737-800BCF freighters.
