= Penas Air =

Airline in Indonesia

IATA	ICAO	Call sign
—	PNS	—
- Founded: 2010
- Ceased operations: 2012
- Fleet size: 2

Penas Air was a regional airline service in Indonesia.

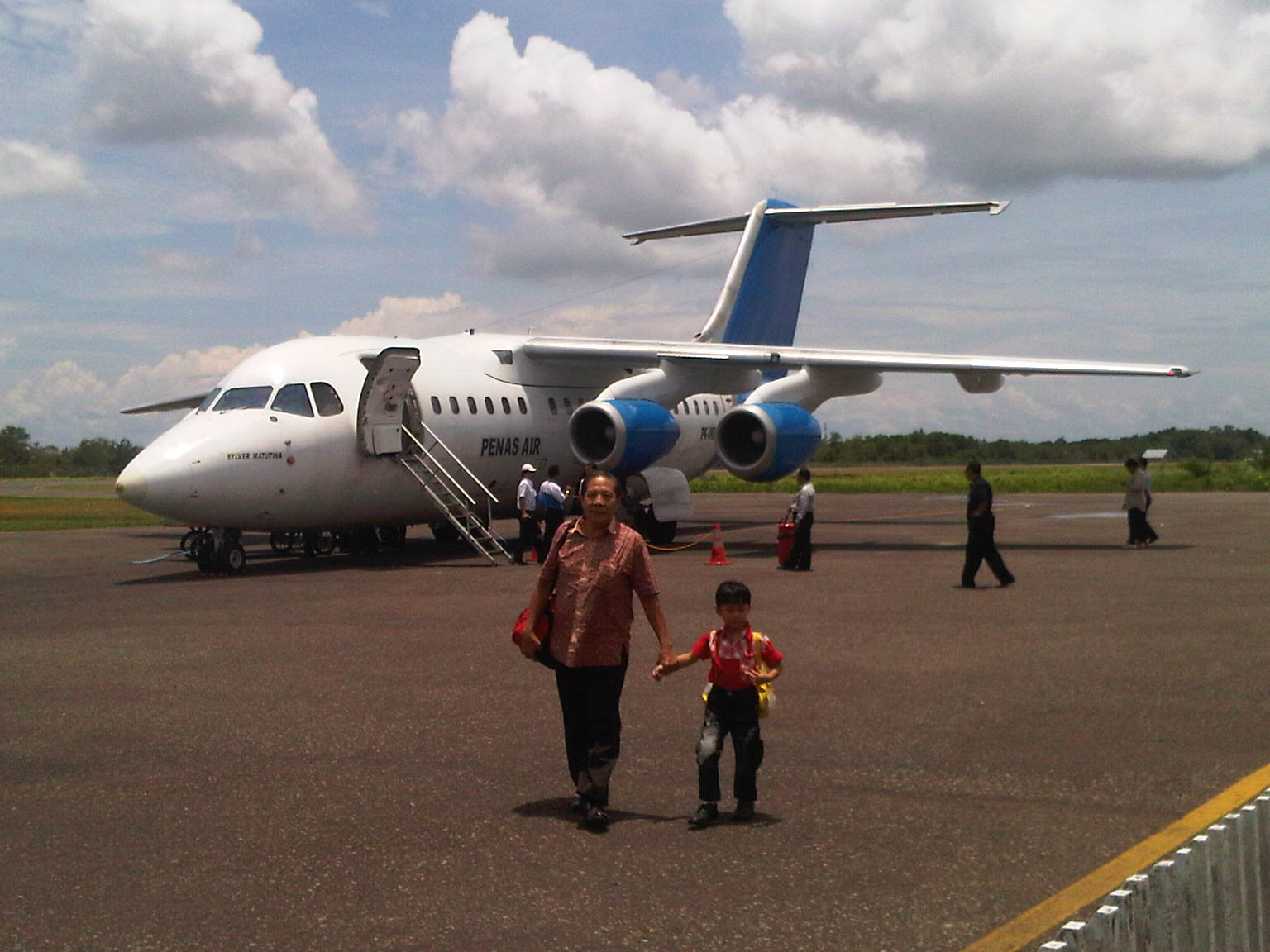
A Penas Air jet landed in Ketapang from Jakarta.

== Destination ==
The airline served the following destinations :

- Jakarta - Soekarno-Hatta International Airport
- Ketapang - Ketapang Airport
- Sibolga - Ferdinand Lumban Tobing Airport
- Lubuklinggau - Silampari Airport

== Fleet ==
Penas Air fleet
Aircraft	Total	Passengers
British Aerospace 146	1	75
