= Tiom =

- District
- Location of the district in Highland Papua Location of the district in Western New Guinea
- Coordinates: 3°55′28.6248″S 138°27′7.9524″E
- Country: Indonesia
- Province: Highland Papua
- Regency: Lanny Jaya
- District seat: Bokon

Area
  - Total: 281.10 km^{2} (108.53 sq mi)

Population (2020)
  - Total: 10,369
  - Density: 36.887/km^{2} (95.537/sq mi)
- Time zone: UTC+9 (WIT)
- Postal Code: 99593
- Climate: Cfb
- Villages: 11

Tiom is an administrative district in Lanny Jaya Regency, Highland Papua, Indonesia. Situated in the central mountainous region with hilly topography and cool climate, the district serves as the region's main administrative and economic center. To support connectivity, Tiom is equipped with Tiom Airport, which serves pioneer flights and is accessible by land.

== Geography ==
Tiom district consists of 11 villages (kampung), namely:

- Dura
- Oyi
- Olume
- Longgalo
- Palunggame
- Yilondum
- Gurika
- Bokon
- Kuapur
- Wandinalome
- Ginime
