= Kemujan Island =

Island in Central Java, Indonesia

Native name: Pulau Kemujan
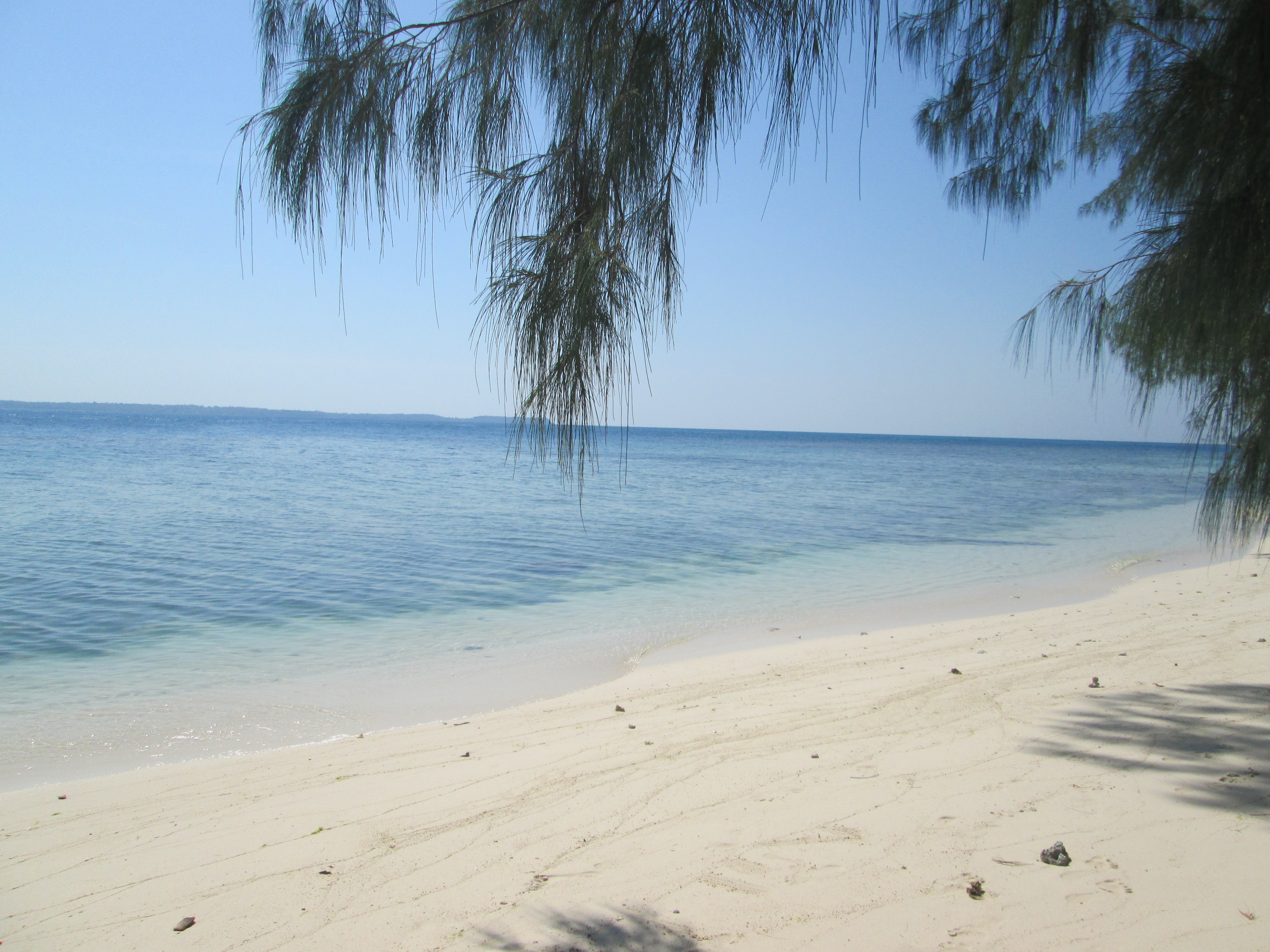
- Beach on Kemujan
- Interactive map of Kemujan Island

Geography
- Coordinates: 5°48′S 110°28′E
- Archipelago: Karimunjawa Islands
- Adjacent to: Java Sea

Kemujan Island (Indonesian: Pulau Kemujan) is an island in the Karimunjawa Islands of Indonesia. It is administered as part of the Jepara Regency, Central Java. Kemujan is the second largest of the Karinmunjawas, and is less forested than the larger Karimun Island. The island is serviced by Dewadaru Airport.

The economy of the island is based around fishing and tourism. Kemujan island also contains rare, naturally-exposed iron ore deposits.
