= Zamrud Aviation Corporation =

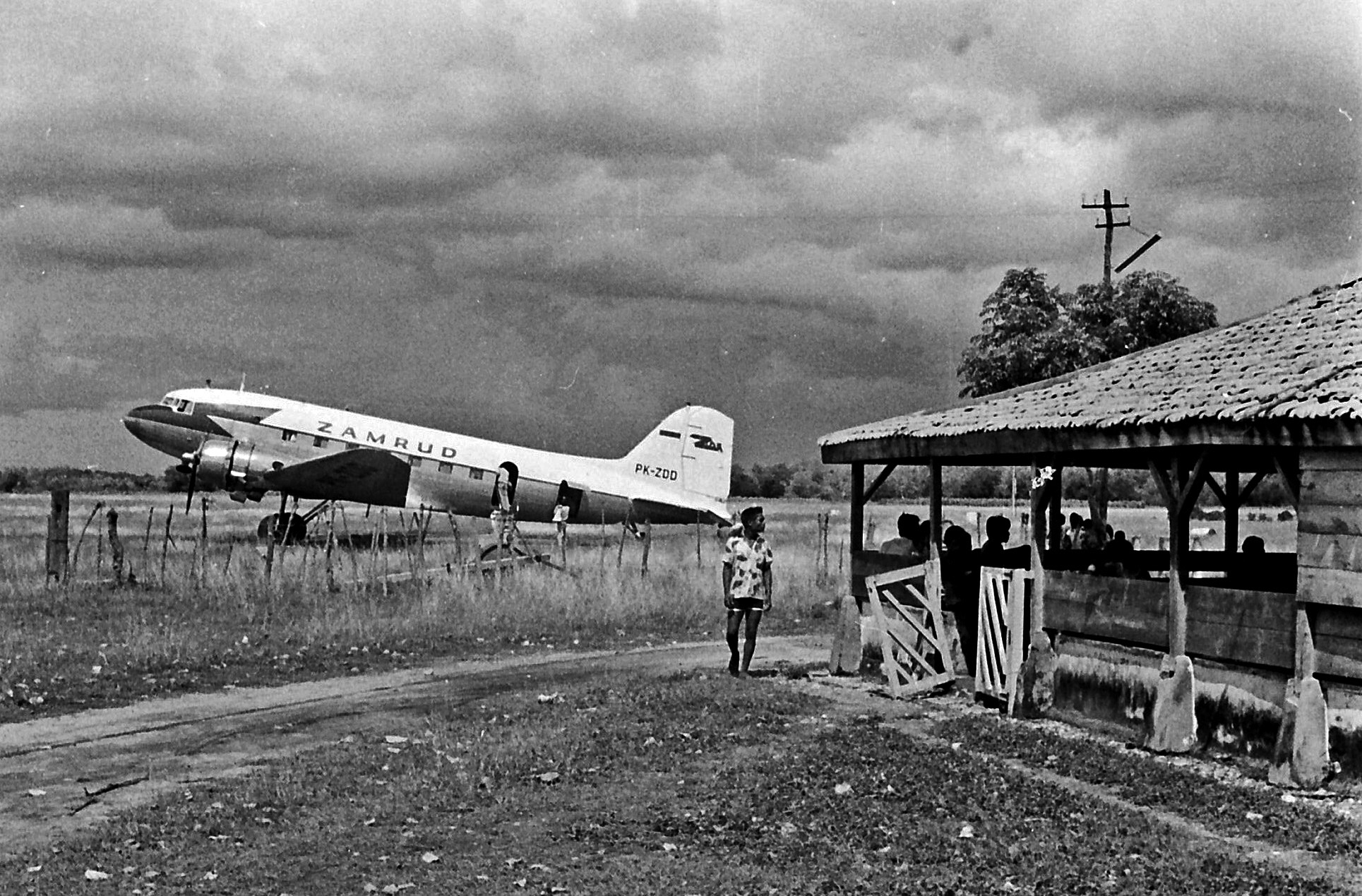
IATA	ICAO	Call sign
ZJ	—	—
- Founded: 1969
- Ceased operations: 1982 (Merged into Airfast Indonesia)
- Operating bases: Ngurah Rai International Airport
- Fleet size: 6
- Destinations: Bima, Sumbawa Besar, Ampenan, Surabaya, Tambolaka, Waingapu, Kupang, Maumere and Dili.
- Headquarters: Indonesia

PT AOA Zamrud Aviation Corporation was an Indonesian airline established in 1969 by the merger of PT Zamrud Airlines and PT Aircraft Owners' Association.

== Destinations ==
From its base at Ngurah Rai International Airport, Denpasar, Zamrud flew to Bima, Sumbawa Besar, Ampenan, Surabaya, Tambolaka, Waingapu, Kupang, Maumere and Dili.

== Fleet ==
The Zamrud fleet consisted of:

- 5 Douglas DC-3
- 1 Douglas DC-6

== Accidents and Incidents ==
Zamrud had 3 accidents:

- 1969 in Lake, Sea, Ocean, River (N65134).
- 1970 in Manado (PK-ZDF).
- 1972 in Sumbawa Besar (PK-ZDD).

Zamrud stopped operating in 1982 and merged into the airline Airfast Indonesia.

== Sources ==
- Aviation Safety Network
- WORLD AIRLINE DIRECTORY
- "Zamrud Aviation | Bureau of Aircraft Accidents Archives"
