= Kalimantan Air Service =

IATA	ICAO	Call sign
n/a	n/a	n/a
- Founded: not launched
- Commenced operations: January 2011
- Headquarters: Kalimantan, Indonesia

Kalimantan Air Service was a planned airline based in Kalimantan, Indonesia. The airline planned to operate scheduled domestic passenger services linking towns and cities on the island of Kalimantan.

== History ==
The airline was established in January 2011 following an agreement between Merpati Nusantara Airlines and the four Kalimantan provincial governments.
