= Lorena Airlines =

IATA	ICAO	Call sign
none	none	—
- Founded: Eka Sari Lorena Surbakti
- Operating bases: Soekarno-Hatta International Airport

PT Eka Sari Lorena Airlines – formerly trading as Lorena Air – was created to be an Indonesian airline which would use two Boeing 737-300 aircraft for scheduled flights from Jakarta to Palembang, Pekanbaru and Surabaya. It was to be based at Soekarno-Hatta International Airport, which existed between 2007 and 2009. It never became operational. Eka Sari Lorena Surbakti – daughter of the owner of bus operating company Lorena Group – was company CEO. The airline's owners claimed to be the first Indonesian airline with an integrated transport system.

== See Also ==
- Lorena (bus company)
