= Mimika Air Flight 514 =

2009 aviation accident

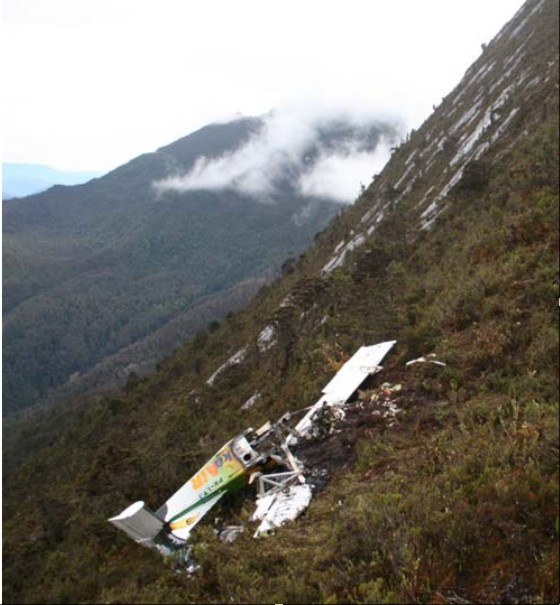
- The wreck of the plane in the mountain

Accident
- Date: 17 April 2009
- Summary: Loss of control
- Site: Mount Gergaji, Papua, Indonesia

Aircraft
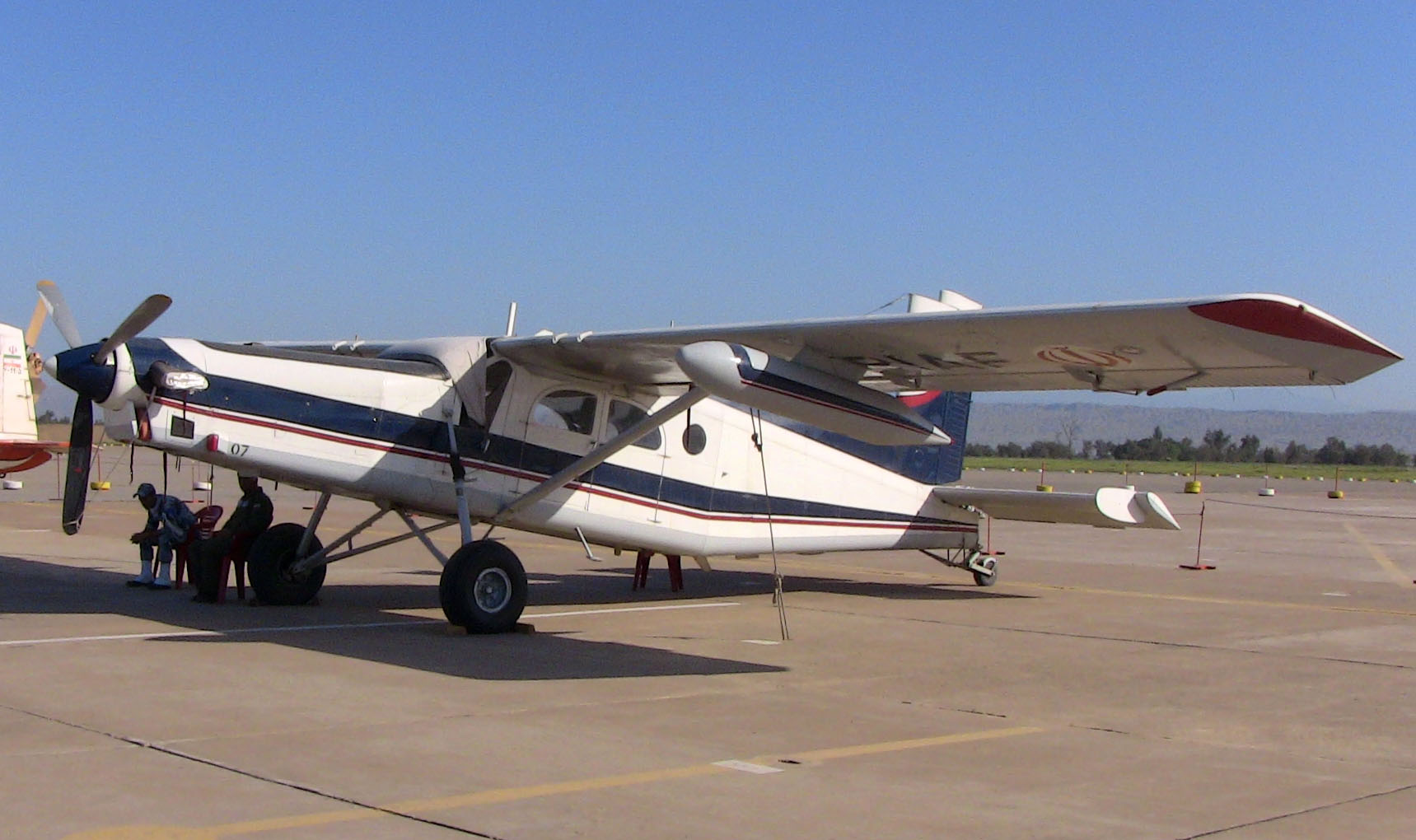
- A Pilatus PC-6 Porter similar to the one involved in the incident.
- Aircraft type: Pilatus PC-6
- Operator: Mimika Air
- Registration: PK-LTJ
- Flight origin: Ilaga, Papua, Indonesia
- Destination: Mulia
- Occupants: 11
- Passengers: 9
- Crew: 2
- Fatalities: 11
- Survivors: 0

Mimika Air Flight 514 was a chartered passenger flight operated by Mimika Air with a Pilatus PC-6 Porter from Ilaga, Papua to Mulia, a town nearby. On the morning of 17 April 2009, while en route to Mulia, the aircraft impacted Mount Gergaji, killing all eleven people on board.

The Mimika Air crash was the second fatal aviation accident in Papua, and the third in Indonesia, in less than two weeks. A cargo aircraft had also crashed in Papua on April 9, killing six people, and an Indonesian Air Force aircraft had crashed in West Java on April 6, killing 24 people.

The Indonesian National Transportation Safety Committee released a report that concluded the crash was due to the pilot's lack of familiarization with the route, coupled with spatial disorientation occurring after the aircraft entered clouds.

== Flight route ==
The Ilaga-Mulia route is at a high elevation among numerous mountain peaks. Pilots familiar with the route and the aircraft type reported that it was impossible for a Pilatus Porter to depart from Ilaga and climb over Mount Gergaji without making a series of circles in flight. Such maneuvering necessarily increases the route's required time beyond the planned 18 minutes.

Aboard the flight were one pilot, one observer, and nine passengers: eight adults and one infant. The aircraft was also carrying a voting box and paper for the country's upcoming national legislative election. The pilot operating the flight had logged 2,664 hours of flying experience, of which 1,412 were on the Porter. He held a current commercial pilot license from Myanmar. A validation certificate was also received by the Indonesian Directorate General of Civil Aviation (DGCA) on 12 February 2009.

== Crash ==
The plane departed from Ilaga Airport at 10:00 AM local time, under visual flight rules. According to records, there was no radio contact between Flight 514 and the tower. Twenty-three minutes after departure, the control tower tried to make contact with the plane, but there were no response, and a search operation was commenced. Later, the search operation was scaled up when a signal from the crashed aircraft's electronic locator transmitter was picked up by search aircraft.

Indonesian search teams discovered the crash site the following day, during an air search. The location of the accident was not on the route normally flown by the flight. The wreckage, which showed the plane had crashed inverted, was still smoking when found. The engine, both propellers, cockpit, and wings was destroyed by the post-impact fire. The forward fuselage was also burned down, along with the main landing gear.

The Porter had gone down about 12,000 ft (3,658 m) up Mount Gergaji, close to the site of a 2006 Trigana Air Service aircraft crash which had killed nine people. None of the eleven people on board the Porter survived. At the time of the accident, the weather in the area, as observed by the Indonesian Agency for Meteorology, Climatology and Geophysics, was mostly clear, with some clouds near the impact area.

Findings by the NTSC concluded that Flight 514 crashed due to pilot error. The pilot joined Mimika Air on 12 February, and lacked knowledge about the route. The pilot attempted to fly a direct route to Mulia using GPS, and tried flying over Mount Gergaji without any circling attempts. When the flight entered clouds, the pilot became spatially disorientated and lost control of the aircraft.

== See also ==
- Santa Barbara Airlines Flight 518
- Trigana Air Service Flight 267
