= BBN Airlines =

Indonesian airline

IATA	ICAO	Call sign
0B	BBL	IRON BIRD
- Founded: 2022; 4 years ago
- Commenced operations: 2024; 2 years ago (scheduled flights only); January 2025; 1 year ago (charter flights only)
- Ceased operations: 28 February 2025; 18 months ago (scheduled flights only)
- Subsidiaries: BBN Airlines Türkiye; BBN Airlines Thailand
- Fleet size: 4
- Destinations: 4
- Parent company: PT BBN Airlines Indonesia
- Headquarters: Jakarta, Indonesia
- Key people: Martynas Grigas (chairman), Brendan Martin (CEO)
- Website: bbnairlines.id

BBN Airlines Indonesia is an Indonesian airline which specialises in aircraft wet leasing and conducts domestic scheduled flights. It is part of Ireland's Avia Solutions Group and classifies itself as offering a mid-range service.

== History ==
BBN Airlines Indonesia is a subsidiary of Avia Solutions Group, an aviation company from Ireland, which is an ACMI (aircraft, crew, maintenance and insurance) provider.

BBN Airlines officially launched in August 2022. BBN Airlines obtained AOC for cargo flights in August 2023 and for passenger flights in March 2024.

BBN Airlines began scheduled passenger flights on September 27, 2024, with the first flight between Jakarta and Surabaya.

As of March 2025, the airline only focuses on charter flights since all scheduled passenger flights were suspended following its last flight on 28 February 2025.

== Destinations ==
As of March 2025, the scheduled flights were terminated. The airline only focuses on charter flights, which have been operated by Sriwijaya Air since January in the same year.

Country	City	Airport	Notes	Refs
Indonesia	Balikpapan	Sultan Aji Muhammad Sulaiman Sepinggan Airport	Terminated	
Indonesia	Biak	Frans Kaisiepo Airport	Charter	
Indonesia	Jayapura	Sentani International Airport	Charter	
Indonesia	Denpasar	Ngurah Rai International Airport	Terminated	
Indonesia	Timika	Mozes Kilangin Airport	Charter	
Indonesia	Ternate	Sultan Babullah Airport	Charter	
Indonesia	Makassar	Sultan Hasanuddin International Airport	Charter	
Indonesia	Manado	Sam Ratulangi International Airport	Charter	
Indonesia	Jakarta	Soekarno–Hatta International Airport	Base	
Indonesia	Pontianak	Supadio International Airport	Terminated	
Indonesia	Surabaya	Juanda International Airport	Terminated	

== Fleet ==
=== Current fleet ===
As of July 2026, BBN Airlines operates the following aircraft:

BBN Airlines fleet
Aircraft	In service	Orders	Passengers	Notes
Boeing 737-800	3	38	186	—
Cargo BBN Airlines fleet
Boeing 737-800BCF	1	—	Cargo	—
Total	4	38		

=== Former fleet ===
As of August 2025, BBN Airlines Indonesia operated 3 Boeing 737-800, 1 Boeing 737-900ER, 1 Boeing 737-400SF and 1 Boeing 737-800BCF.
