= Post Ekspres Prima =

Airline based in Jakarta, Indonesia

IATA	ICAO	Call sign
-	-	-
- Commenced operations: 1992
- Operating bases: Halim Perdanakusuma International Airport
- Fleet size: See Fleet below
- Headquarters: Jakarta, Java, Indonesia

Post Ekspres Prima is an airline based in Jakarta, Indonesia. It operates passenger services and its main base is Halim Perdanakusuma International Airport, Jakarta.

== History ==
The airline was established and started operations in 1992 as Rajawali Air.

== Fleet ==
As of March 2007 the Post Express Prima fleet includes:

- 1 Grumman Gulfstream I

=== Previously operated ===
In August 2006 the airline also operated:

- 1 Fokker F28-1000
