= Ilaga, Central Papua =

Ilaga
- Town
- Location in Central Papua Location in Indonesian Papua Location in Indonesia
- Coordinates: 3°58′39″S 137°37′1″E
- Country: Indonesia
- Province: Central Papua
- Elevation: 2,286 m (7,500 ft)
- Time zone: UTC+9 (WIT)

Ilaga is the name of a small town and a farming valley in Central Papua, Indonesia, with an elevation of 2,286 m (7,500 ft). It is also the capital of a government district (kecamatan) of the same name, and of the newly created (2008) Puncak Regency. Most of the residents of the area belong to the Lani tribe. It has a small airport and a tiny community of non-Papuan traders and government officials from other parts of Indonesia. A river of the same name runs through the valley, and is a tributary of the Ilorong. The valley lies about midway between the Enarotali and Baliem valleys.

== Air crash ==
In April 2009 a small plane travelling from Mulia (Puncak Jaya Regency) to Ilaga - (Mimika Air Flight 514) - crashed, killing all 10 aboard. Recovery operations and identification of remains were carried out from Ilaga, which is the administrative centre of Indonesia's Puncak Regency.

== Outside encounters ==
The Western Dani of Ilaga's first extensive contacts with the non-Papuan world began in 1950, when missionaries began to use planes to extend their contacts into the highland areas of the region. The region was not entirely "isolated" or "cut-off" from the outside world before the European arrival as is sometimes reported. Ilaga traditionally was along the main trade routes from the agricultural highland valleys, whose pigs and farm produce were traded for shells, salt and other goods with coastal tribes.

The Ilaga area has been at times a center of support for the Free Papua Movement (Organisasi Papua Merdeka, OPM). In October 2001 OPM fighters briefly took and held the town from Indonesian forces.

== Administrative area ==
Ilaga District is divided into 9 villages, namely:

- Kago
- Kimak
- Wuloni
- Nipuralome
- Kibogolome
- Tagaloa
- Jenggerpaga
- Kalebut
- Ilmabet
