= Asian One Air =

Indonesian airline

Mimika Air
IATA	ICAO	Call sign
GT	GTA	GTA
- Founded: 1998
- Operating bases: Timika
- Fleet size: 3
- Key people: CEO Dolf Latumahina
- Website: https://asianoneair.id/

Asian One Air, formerly known as PT Mimika Air and GT Air (Germania Trisila Air) is a charter airline founded in 1988, which currently serves charter and pioneer flights from Timika to other cities.

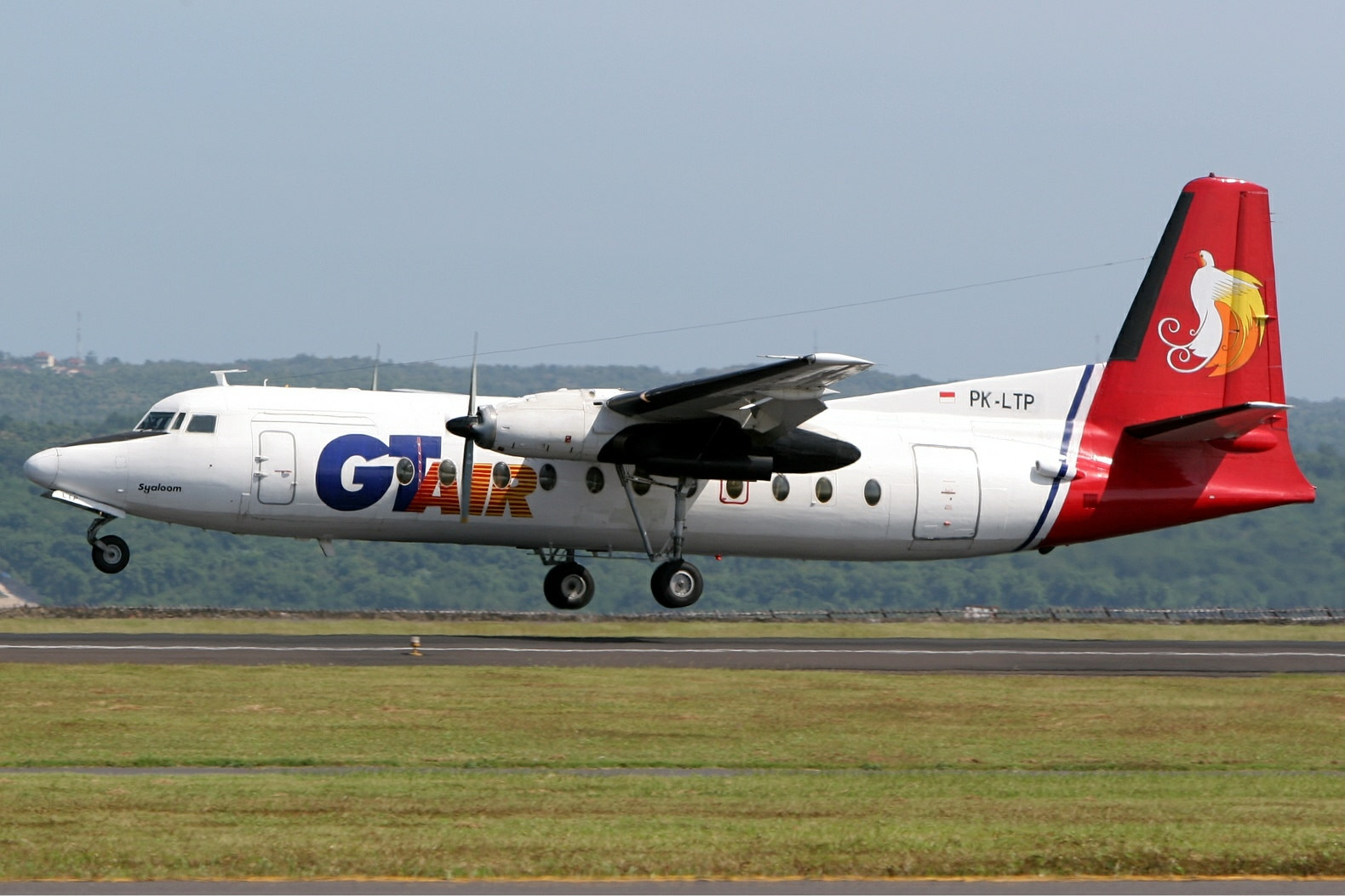
A GT Air Fokker F-27-500 Friendship

== History ==
GT Air was established in 1998. Its official name is Germania Trisila Air. From November 2004 to mid-2006, GT Air operated scheduled flights between Denpasar (Bali) and Lombok.

In 2006, a DHC-6 Twin Otter was chartered to transport aid workers to Aceh and North Sumatra provinces in the aftermath of the 2004 Indian Ocean earthquake. In July 2007, the Directorate General of Civil Aviation revoked the air operator's certificate of Germania Trisila Air, along with another eight Indonesian airlines, citing safety concerns.

In 2019 the airline was rebranded as Asian One Air.

As of July 2025, the airline currently serves pioneer flights from its base in Timika to other cities including Kaimana, Fakfak, Babo, Kenyam, Paro and others.

== Fleet ==
As of August 2006, the Asian One Air fleet comprised the following aircraft:

Mimika Air fleet
Aircraft	Total
Cessna 208B	2
Cessna 208B EX	1
Total	3

== Accidents and incidents ==
- On 23 February 2005, DHC-6 Twin Otter PK-LTY of GT Air struck a fence on landing at Enarotali Airport on a flight from Timika.
- On 12 April 2005, DHC-6 Twin Otter PK-LTZ of GT Air crashed near Enarotali while on a scheduled passenger flight from Timika to Enarotali. The wreckage was not discovered until 17 April. All three crew and fourteen passengers were killed.
- On 17 April 2009, Mimika Air Flight 514, operated by Pilatus PC-6 PK-LTJ crashed into Mount Gergaji, Papua, killing all 11 people on board.
