= Karimunjawa =

Archipelago in Central Java, Indonesia

Karimunjawa Islands Kepulauan Karimunjawa
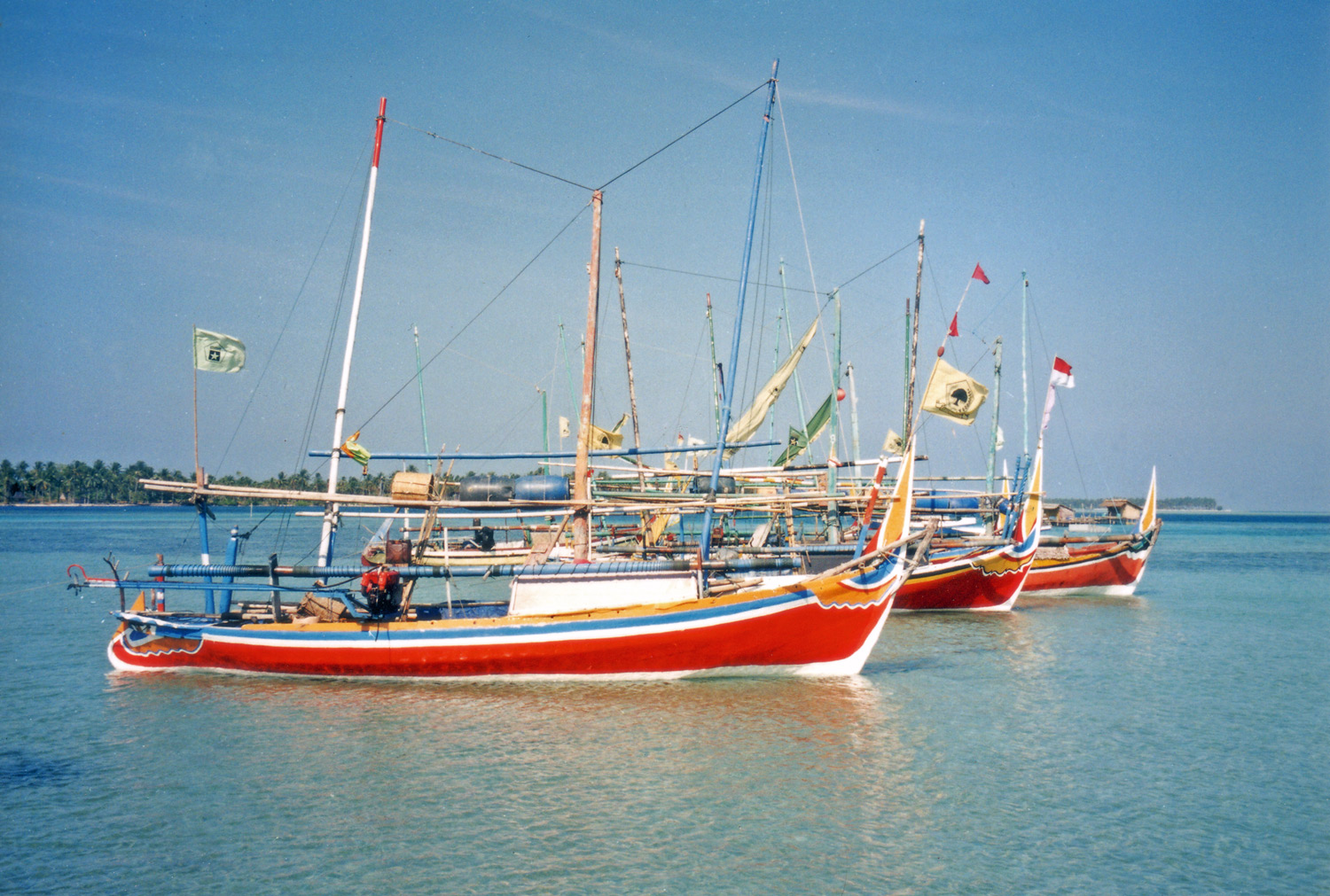
- Fishing boats in the main harbour
- Nicknames: The Paradise of Java, Caribbean van Java
- Location within Indonesia
- Coordinates: 5°49′09″S 110°27′32″E
- Country: Indonesia
- Province: Central Java
- Regency: Jepara
- District: Karimunjawa
- Village: 5

Government
  - District Head: Budi Krisnanto

Area
  - Total: 45.62 km^{2} (17.61 sq mi)

Population (mid 2024 estimate)
  - Total: 10,800
  - Density: 237/km^{2} (613/sq mi)
- Time zone: UTC+7 (WIB)
- Website: www.karimunjawa.go.id

Karimunjawa Islands or Karimunjava Islands (Indonesian: Kepulauan Karimunjawa) is an archipelago of 27 islands in the Java Sea, Indonesia, approximately 80 kilometres northwest of Jepara. They have a total land area of 45.62 km^{2}. The main island is known as Karimun (2,700 ha), while the second-largest island is Kemujan (1,400 ha).

As of the 2020 Census, the population of the island group was 9,789 which lived on five of the islands. The official estimate as at mid 2024 was 10,800. The population is largely Javanese, with pockets of Bugis and Madurese inhabitants. Javanese culture is dominant in the islands which are the only islands off Java where Javanese is the lingua franca.

Twenty-two of the islands have been declared in 2001 as a marine reserve, the Karimunjawa National Park. Five more islands are either privately owned or are under the control of the Indonesian Navy.

The archipelago is served by Dewadaru Airport which provides scheduled airline services to Semarang and Surabaya.

== Islands and administration ==
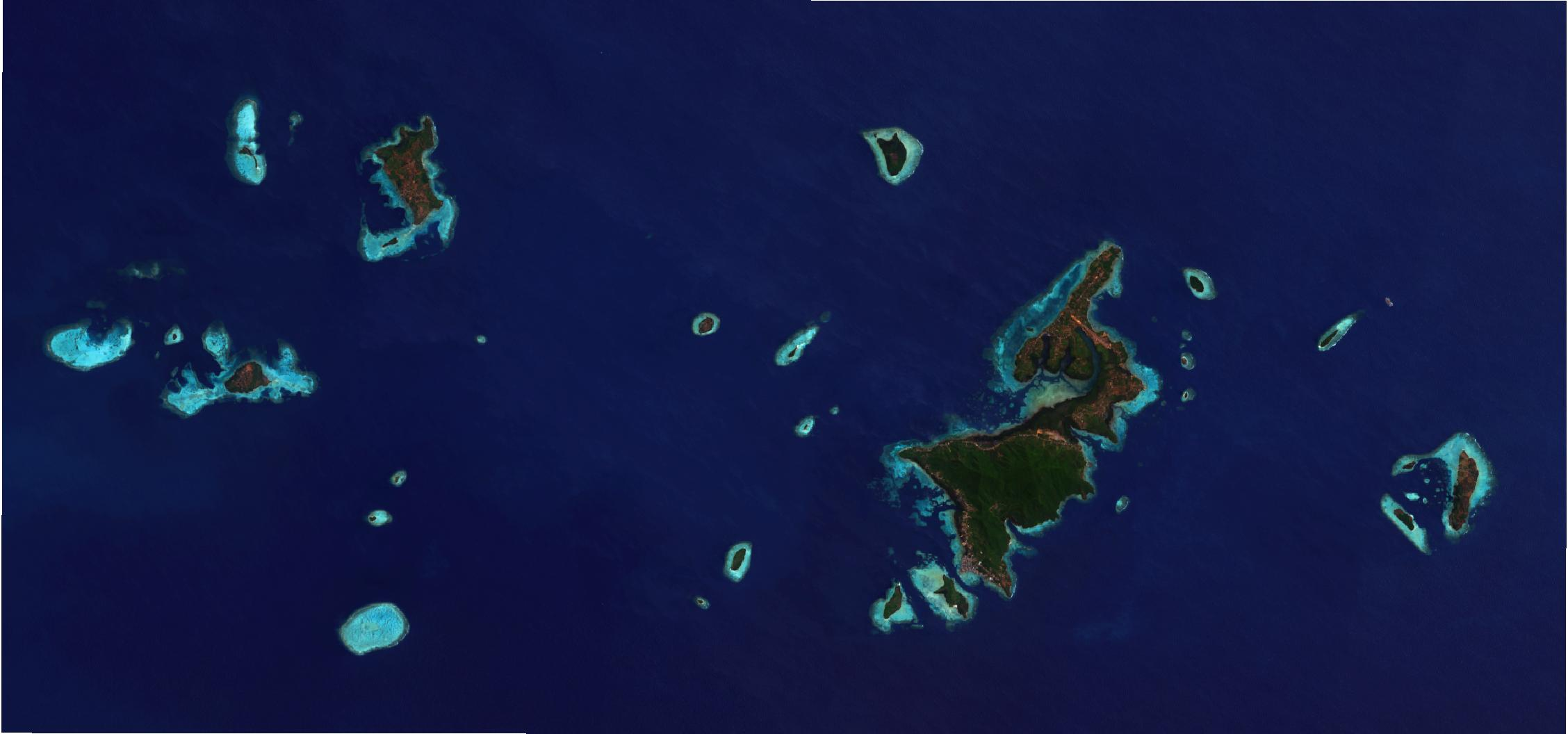
Satellite image of the Karimunjawa Islands

The Karimunjawa islands comprise a district (kecamatan) which is made up of three villages (Karimun, Kemujan, and Parang) and forms a part of the Jepara Regency (kabupaten) of Central Java province. The island of Bawean lies east of this group, and is part of Gresik Regency, in East Java province.

== History ==
According to local folklore, the archipelago was discovered by Sunan Nyamplungan (Amir Hasan), a son of one of the Wali Songo, the nine saints who brought Islam to Java. He is said to have settled on the main island to spread his father’s teachings. His tomb on Karimunjawa is an important place of pilgrimage.

Archeological finds of Chinese ceramics on the seabed near the islands which date from around the 13th century suggest that the islands were once part of a trade route to Java. Apart from use as a pirate base, the islands are believed to have been uninhabited until a penal settlement was established during the British occupation of Java in the early nineteenth century.

In 1818, the Netherlands appointed a Prussian nobleman named Carel Rudolph von Michalofski (1792–1854) as post holder of the islands. His first task was to drive out the pirates who were rife there. He then had to establish a nagari on the islands with 1,100 convicts. Within fifteen years, he managed to transform the notorious pirate’s den into a thriving archipelago. The settlement was temporarily abandoned by the Dutch during the Java War of 1825–1830, but the former convicts remained as settlers. Coconut plantations set up during the convict period became a major source of income, as did fishing.

The islands were declared a national park in 1988.

== Geology and climate ==
The archipelago consists predominantly of pre-Tertiary continental islands primarily of quartzites and shales covered by basaltic lava. Geologically, the islands are part of Sundaland. The islands have extensive fringing and patchy coral reefs. The best time to visit the islands is during the dry season, generally from April to October.

== Economy ==
The main source of income for the local population is fishing, followed by services and commerce. Travel to the islands from Java is sometimes limited during the rainy season around the January–March period during bad weather which can bring large waves to the area.

There are a number of snorkeling spots. There is pressure on local environmental resources because of the rapidly expanding tourist industry.

== Gallery ==
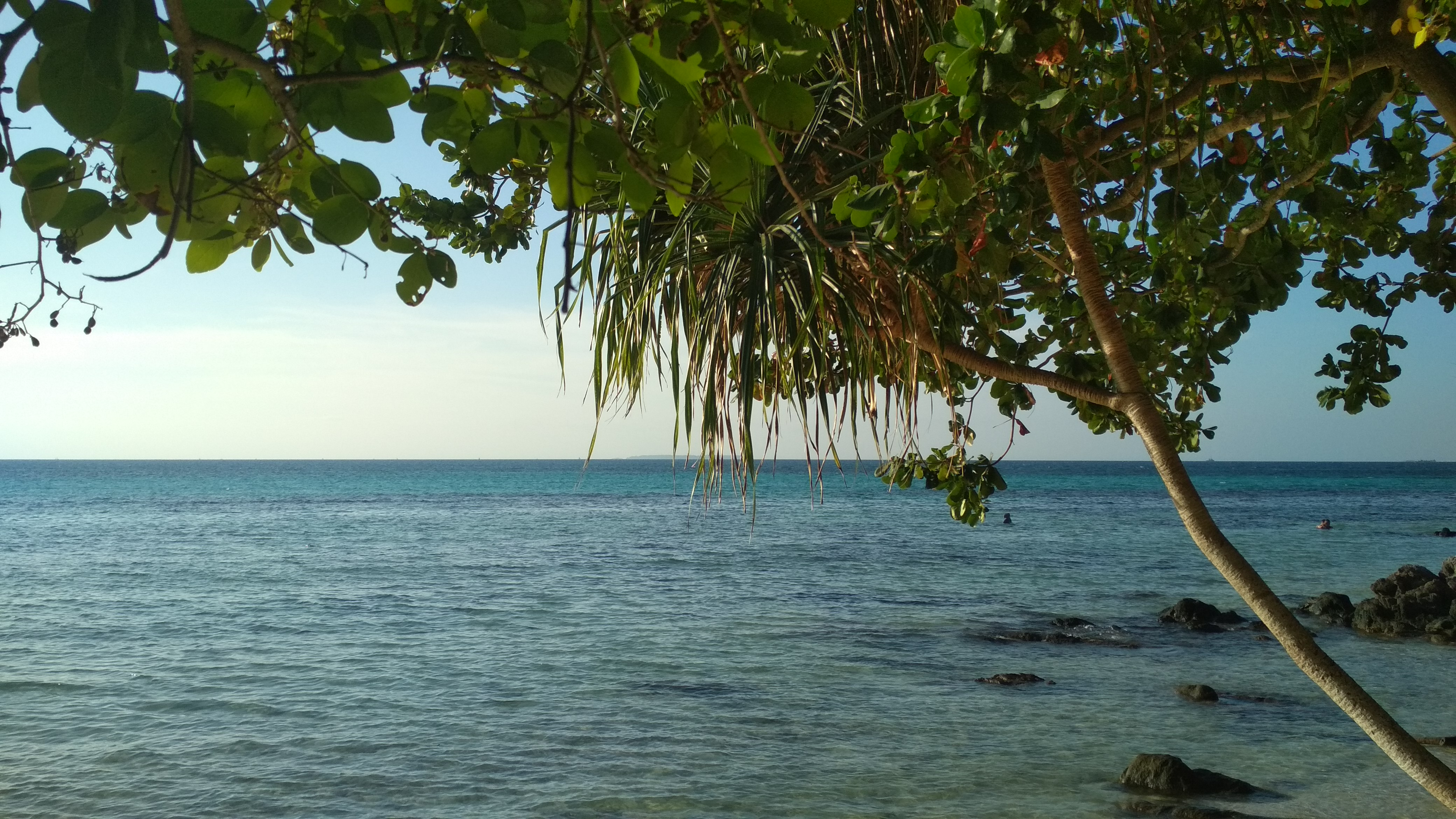

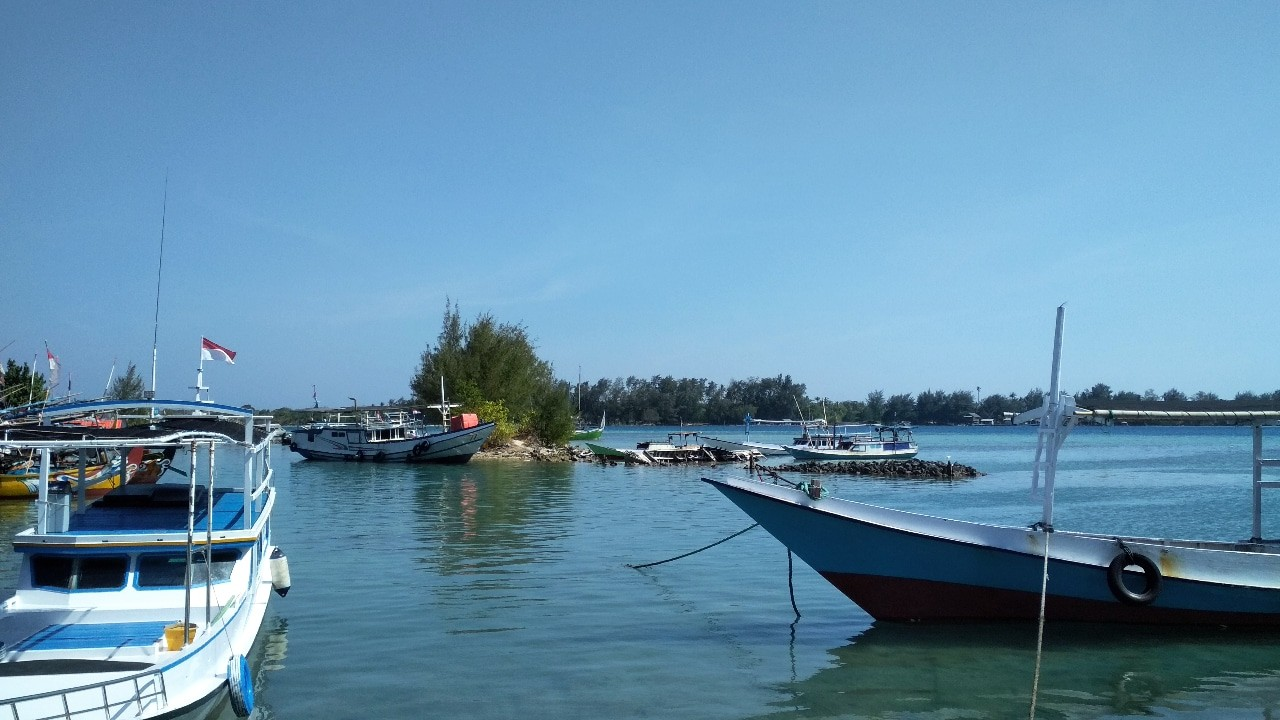

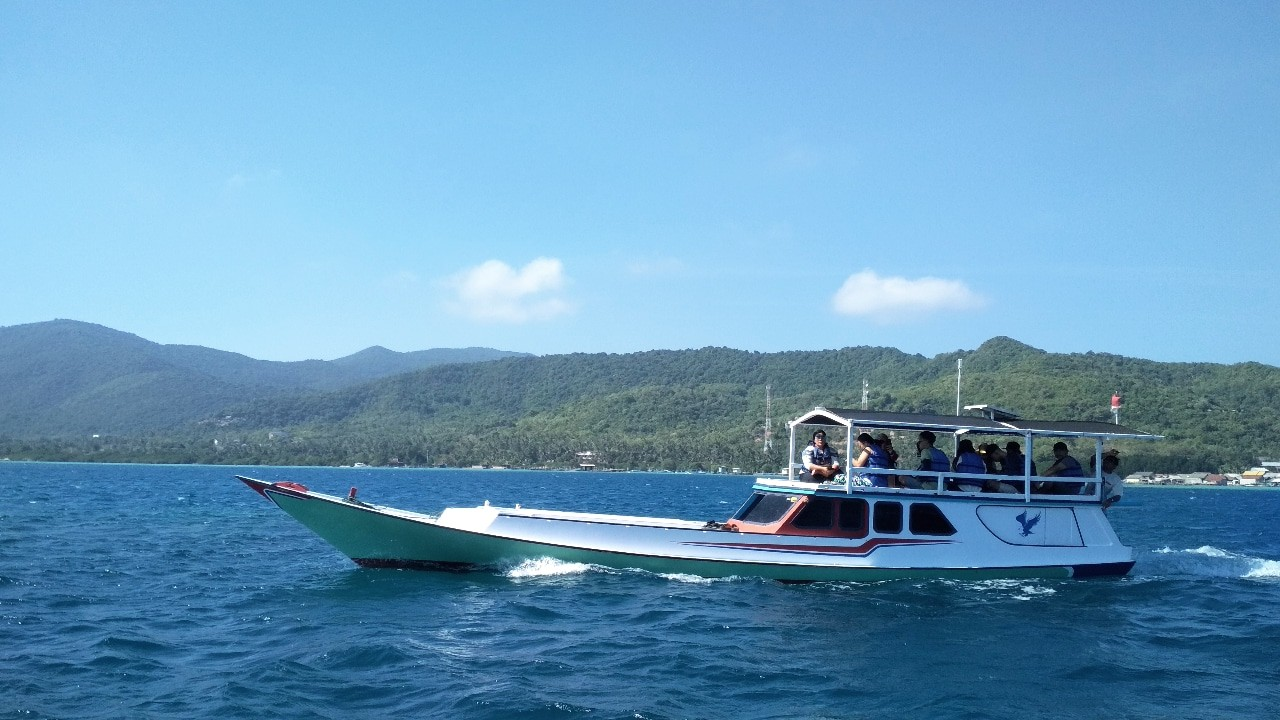

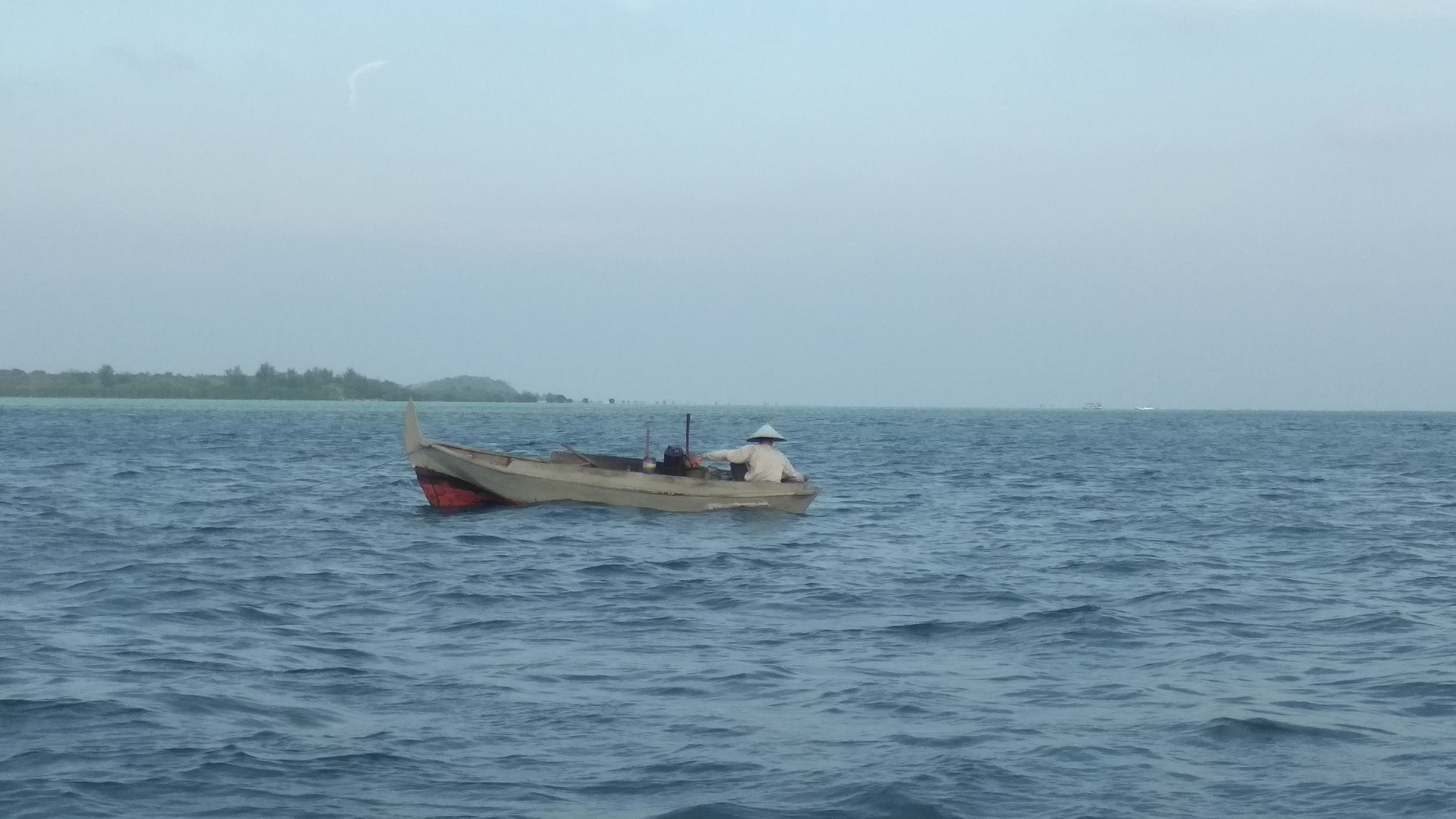

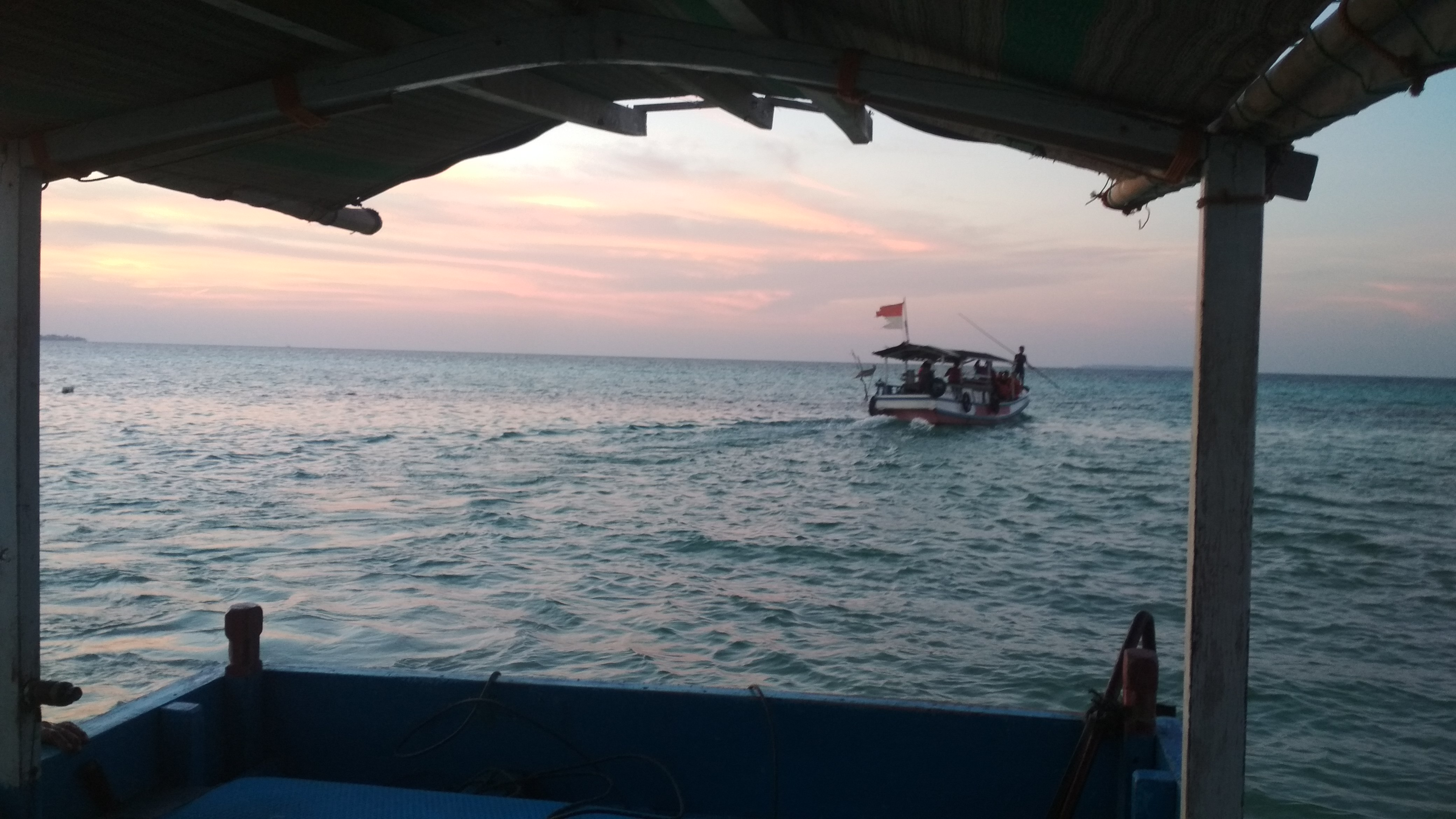

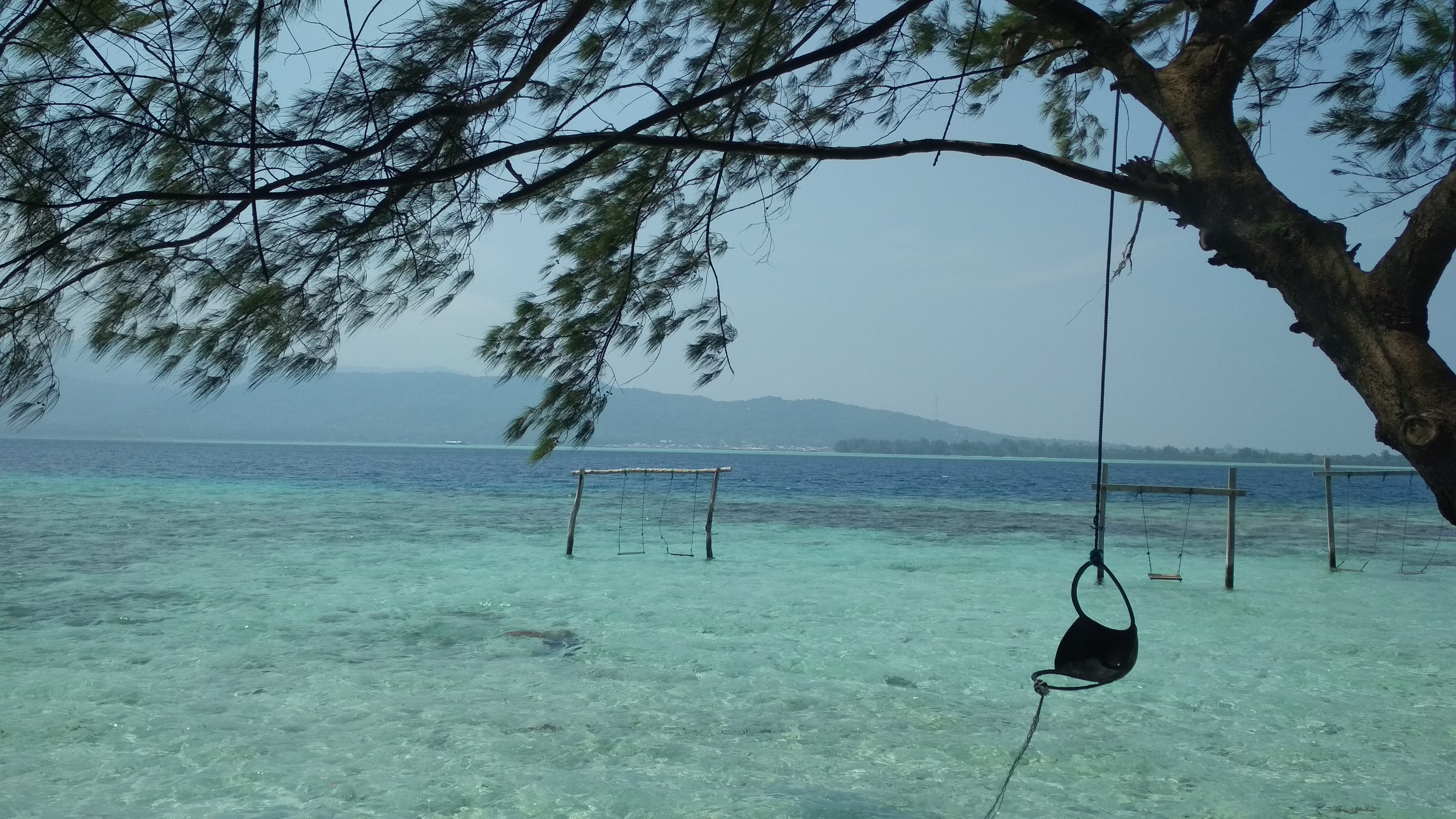

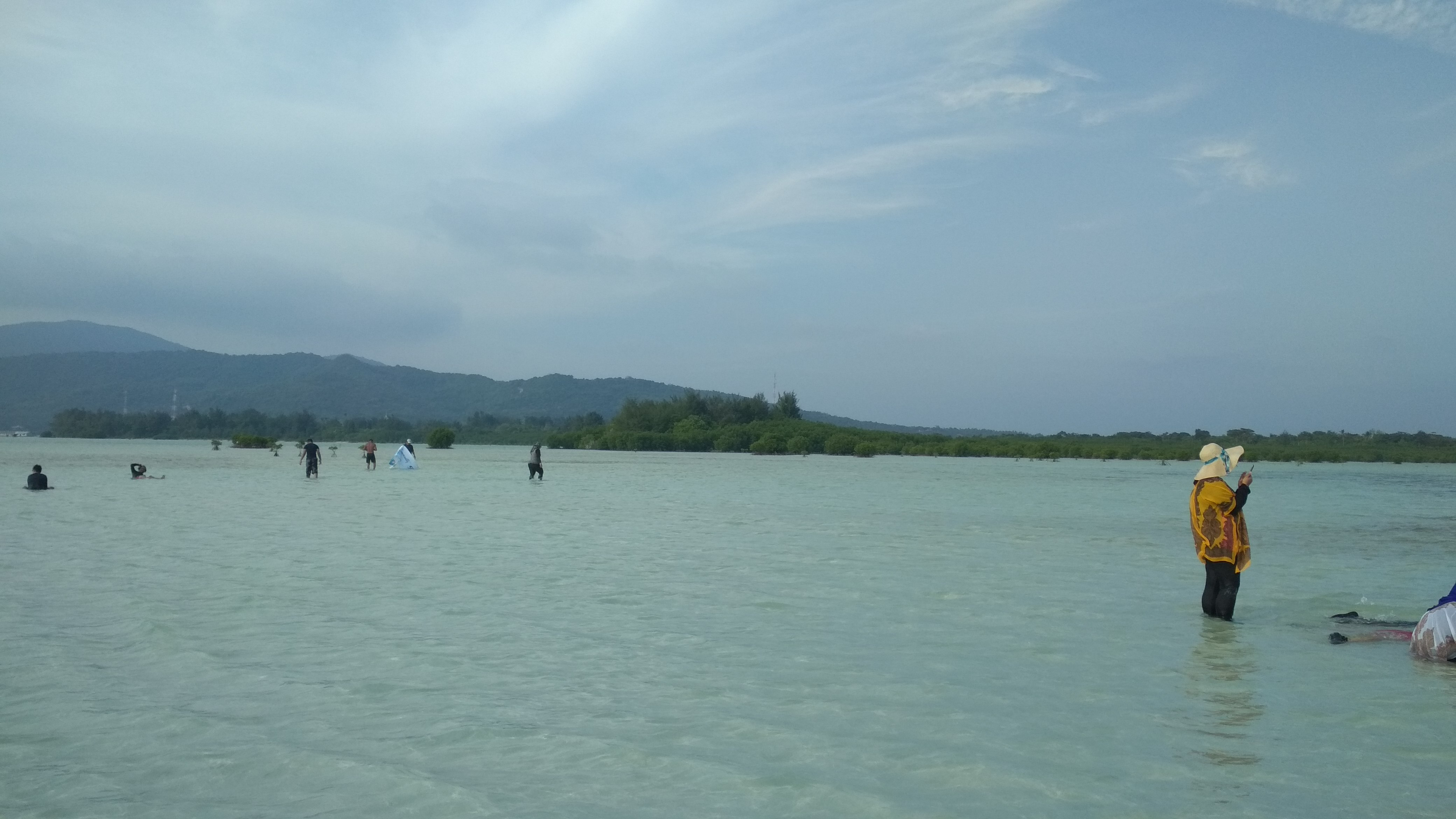

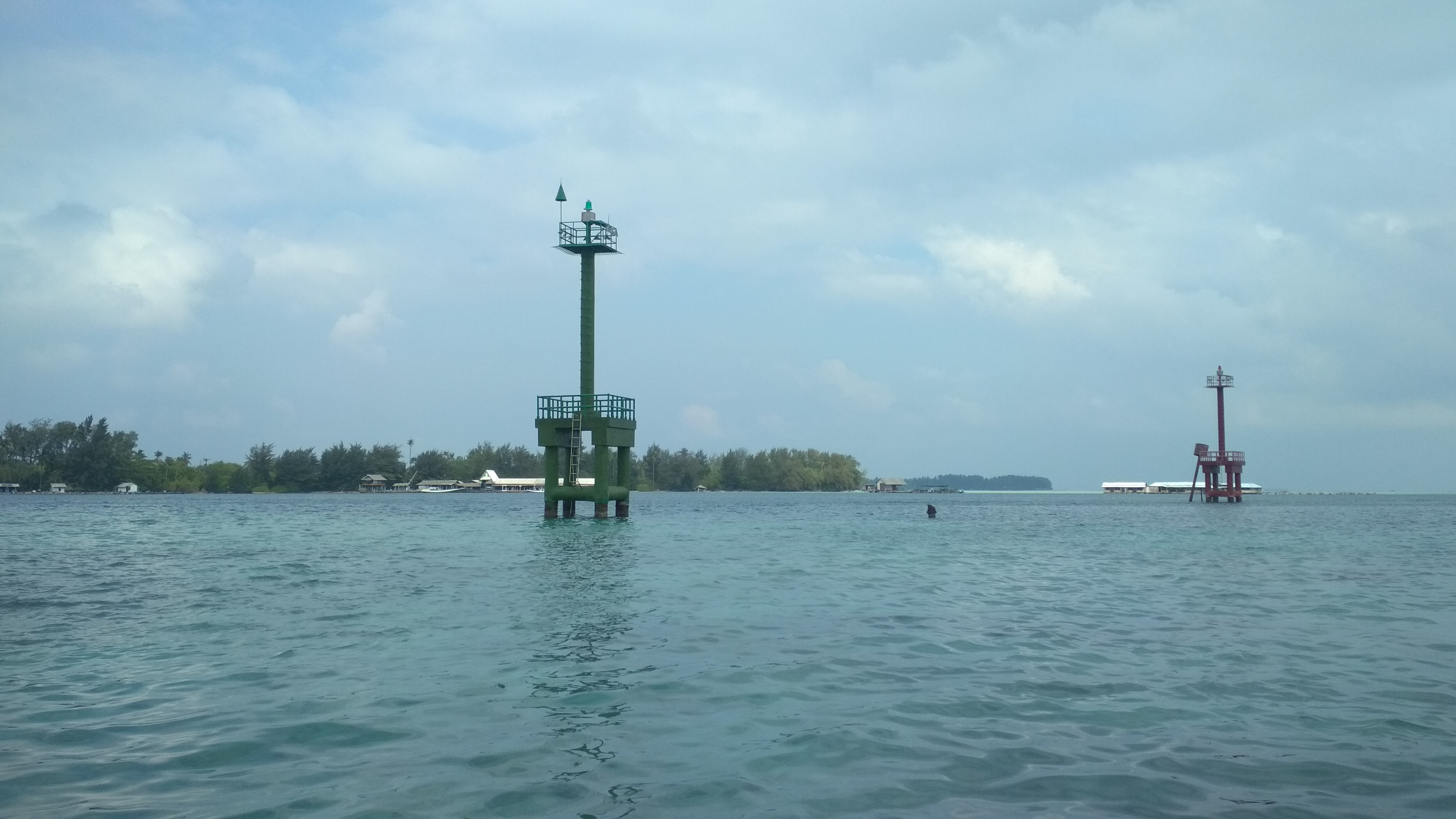

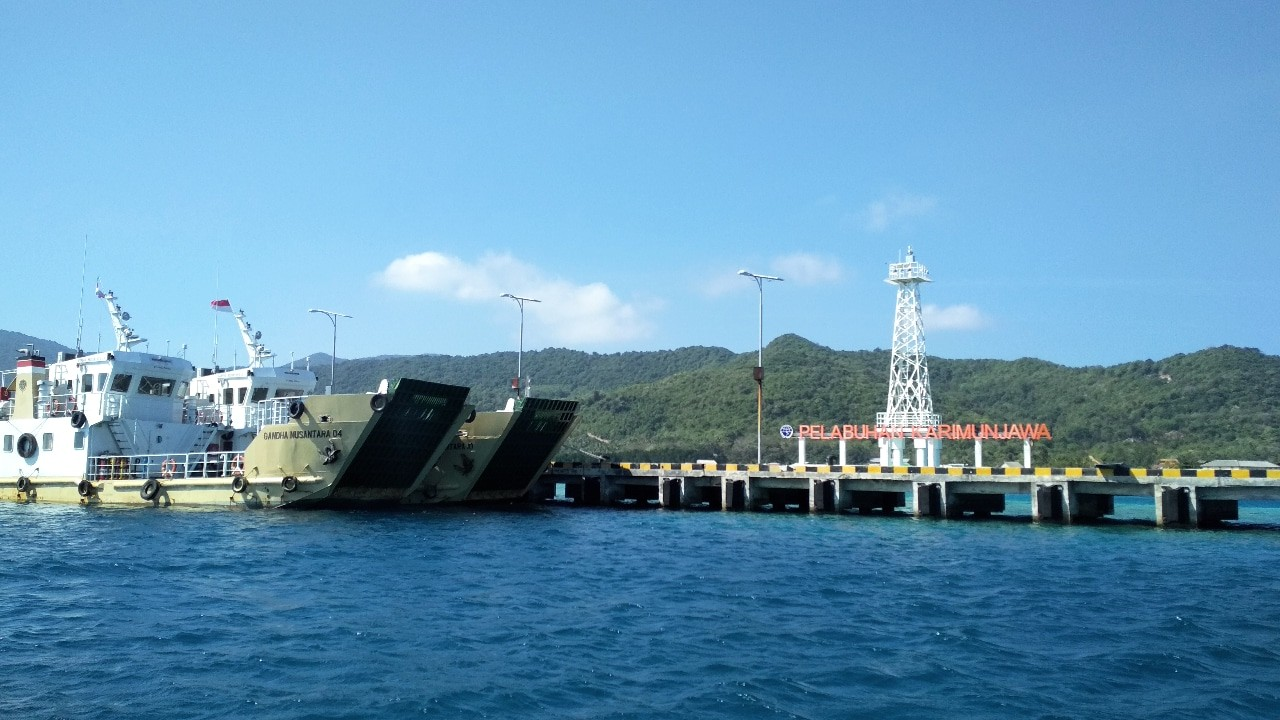
