= Air Efata =

Indonesian airline

IATA	ICAO	Call sign
W2	EIJ	EFATA
- Founded: 2004
- Commenced operations: 9 January 2006
- Ceased operations: February 2007
- Operating bases: Soekarno-Hatta International Airport
- Focus cities: Surabaya Juanda International Airport
- Destinations: 8
- Parent company: Efata Papua Airlines
- Headquarters: Jakarta, Indonesia

Air Efata (ICAO: EIJ, call sign: EFATA), previously known as Efata Papua Airlines early in its operations, was an airline based in Indonesia. Air Efata was a full-service airline, offering a choice of Deluxe Class and Economy Class, and serving hot meals on flights. E-ticketing was available.

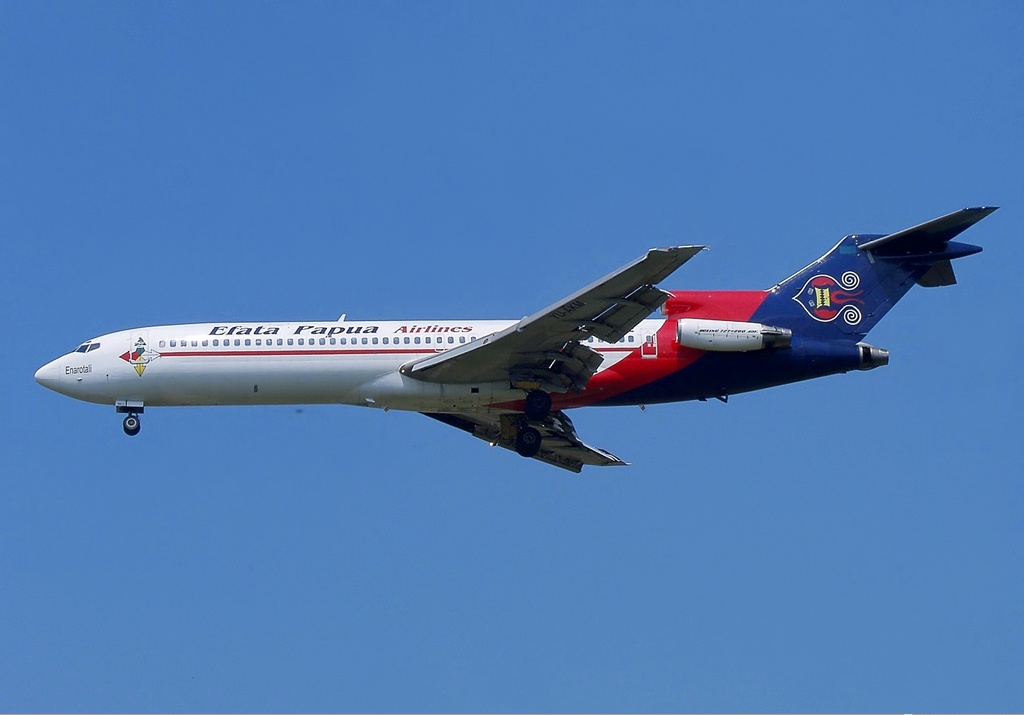
Efata Papua Airlines Boeing 727

== History ==
Air Efata was founded in 2004. Its first flight commenced in early 2004 with one 727-200 from Jakarta to Jayapura. The airline was unable to continue its operations after the aircraft returned to Jakarta. After two years of inactivity, Air Efata recommenced operations on 9 January 2006 with a fleet of MD-83s and MD-88s. Only surviving for a short time, the company had to suspend all service again, and its licence was withdrawn. The CEO and owner of Air Efata then committed suicide in January 2007.

In February 2007, the Transportation Ministry delayed license revocation of 11 idle airlines, including PT Efata Papua Airlines, to give restructuring opportunities to the operators. This did not have any outcome for Air Efata.

== Destinations ==
Air Efata served:

- Jakarta
- Surabaya
- Malang
- Makassar
- Ambon
- Timika
- Biak
- Jayapura

== Fleet ==
As of August 2006 the Efata Papua Airlines fleet included:

- 1 McDonnell Douglas MD-83
- 2 McDonnell Douglas MD-88

On its first ever operation (which was abortive), the airline used

- 1 Boeing 727-2H9 from Aviogenex in 04/2005 in full colors. The aircraft was previously registered as YU-AKM, then re-registered as PK-EPV.

Air Efata leased the three Boeing-MD83/88 aircraft with a two-class passenger seat configuration from GECAS. Component support was provided by SAS Component Group A/S (a joint venture between ST Aerospace and SAS Technical Services - now named ST Aerospace Solutions (Europe) A/S) of Scandinavia, with engine support by Pratt & Whitney and major maintenance by Garuda Maintenance Facility (GMF).
