= Dewadaru Airport =

Airport in Karimunjawa, Central Java, Indonesia

Dewandaru Airport Bandar Udara Dewandaru
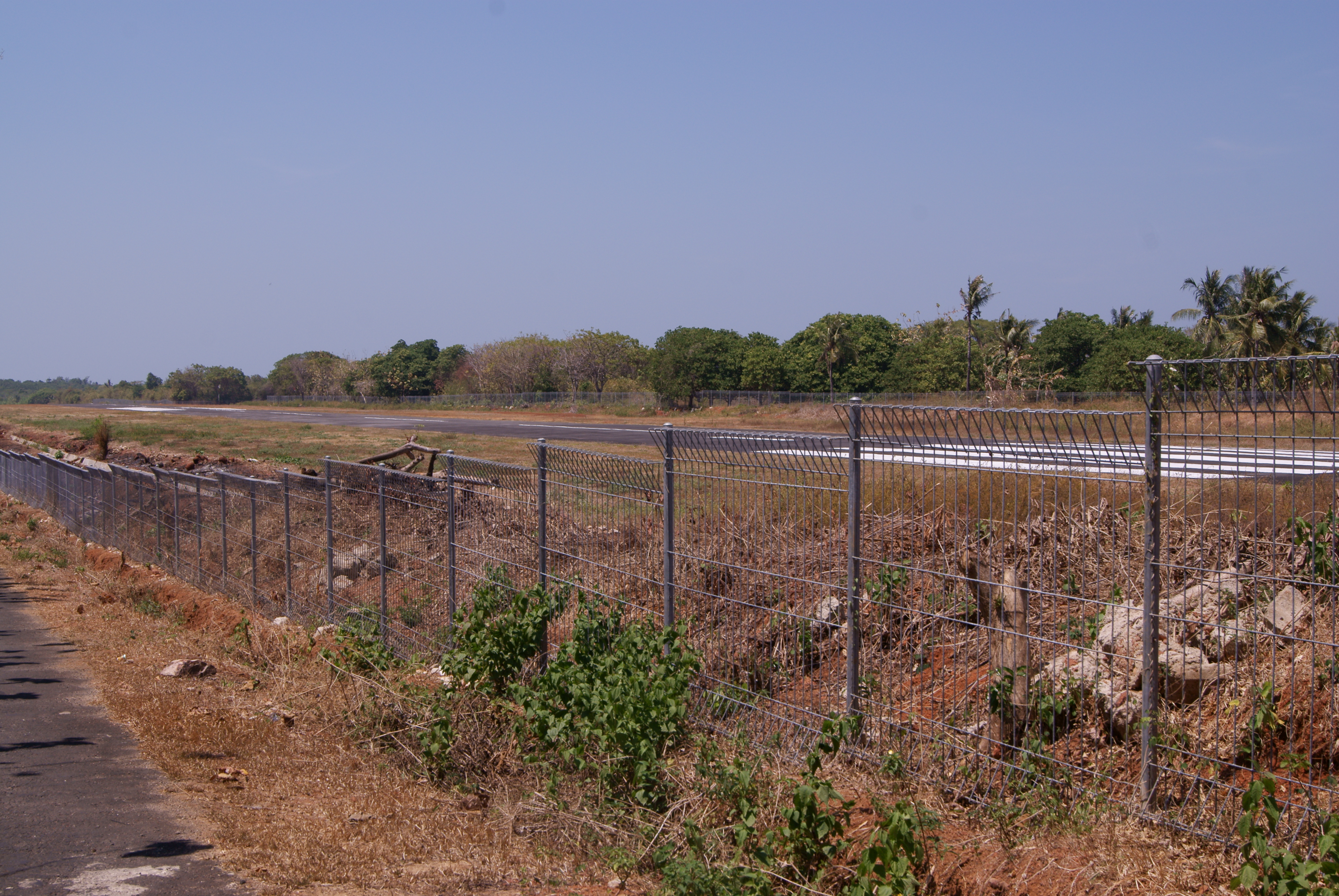
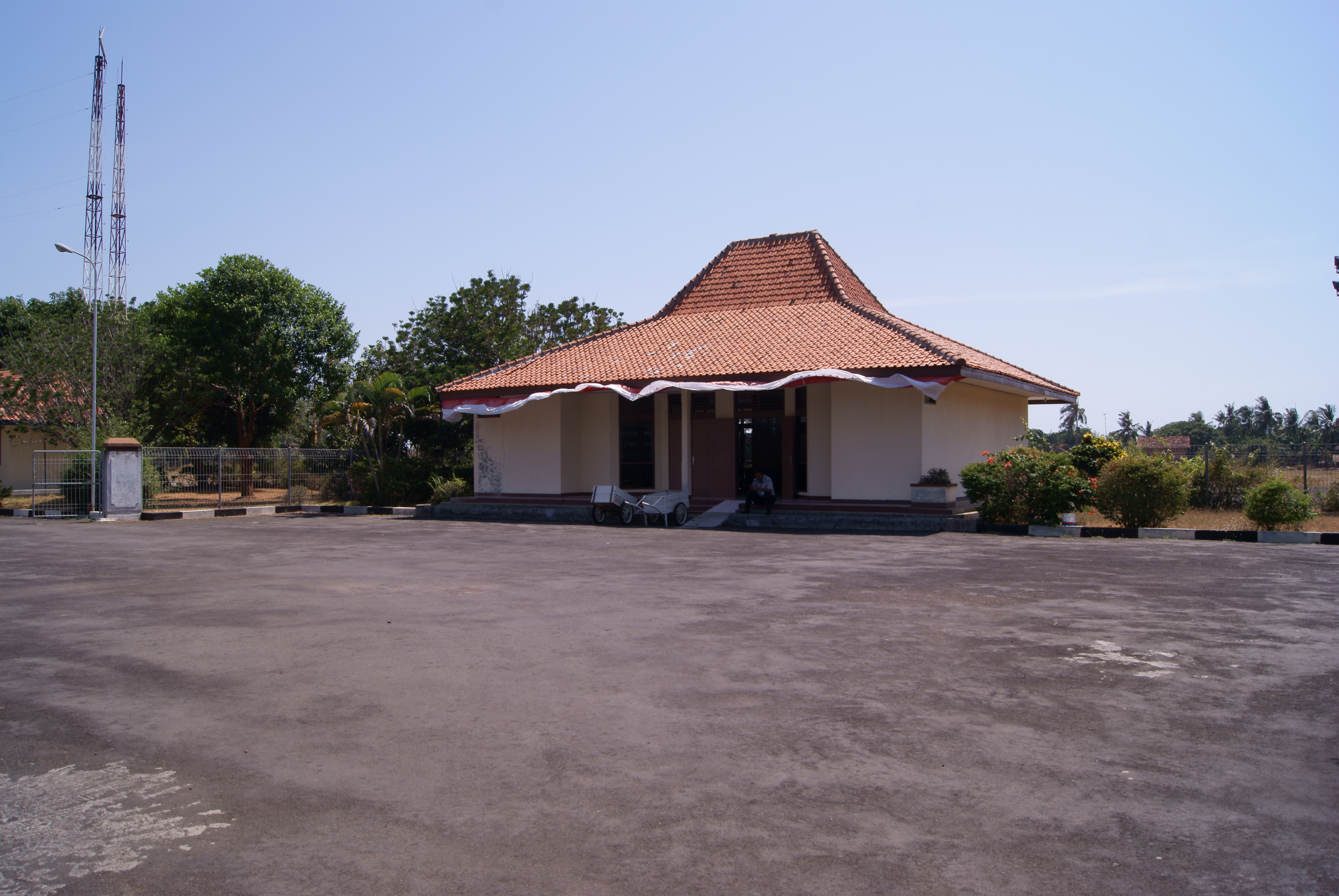
- IATA: KWB; ICAO: WAHU

Summary
- Airport type: Public
- Owner: Indonesian Government
- Serves: Karimunjawa
- Location: Karimunjawa, Central Java, Indonesia
- Time zone: WIB (UTC+07:00)
- Elevation AMSL: 15.0 ft / 5 m
- Coordinates: 05°48′04″S 110°28′43″E

Map

Runways
Direction	Length		Surface
Direction	m	ft	Surface
13/31	1,400	4,593	Asphalt

Dewandaru Airport (IATA: KWB, ICAO: WAHU) is an airport serving Karimunjawa, an archipelago in Central Java province of Indonesia. It is located on Kemujan Island in Karimunjawa. Kemujan Island is considered to be a part of Karimun Island, the largest island in Karimunjawa, as both islands are only separated by a small river. The distance from the airport to the city centre at Karimun Island is 22 kilometres. Dewandaru Airport has one runway, with dimensions of 1,400 metres (4,593 ft) by 30 metres (98 ft), which allows the operation of aircraft up to ATR 72-600.

== Etymology ==
The name of this airport comes from the endemic tree of Karimunjawa, called Dewandaru. According to a local belief, the ship of anyone who takes the wood of this tree would sink on leaving Karimunjawa, although taking just a little part of it.

== Airlines and destinations ==
The following airlines offer scheduled passenger service:

Airlines	Destinations
Susi Air	Semarang, Yogyakarta–Adisucipto
