= Premiair =

Indonesian airline

Premiair (PT Ekspres Transportasi Antarbenua)
IATA	ICAO	Call sign
-	-	PREMIAIR
- Founded: 1989; 37 years ago
- Operating bases: Halim Perdanakusuma International Airport
- Subsidiaries: PT. Wira Adirajasa Dirgantara (WIRA); PT. Wira Jasa Angkasa (WJA); PT. Mitra Adirajasa Dirgantara (MAD)
- Fleet size: 2
- Destinations: VIP charters
- Parent company: PT. Ekspres Transportasi Antarbenua
- Headquarters: Jakarta, Indonesia
- Key people: Tony Dwihastanto Hadi (President Director); Lingga Sadoko Bijoyo (Managing Director); Tjandra Susanto Putra (Chief Financial Officer)
- Website: www.flypremiair.com

Premiair is an aviation services and aircraft management operator based in Indonesia, serving domestic and international markets. The company is headquartered at Halim Perdanakusuma International Airport in Jakarta.

In 2008, Premiair earned to Indonesia's top safety rank. It is one of only four Indonesian airlines that is allowed to fly to the European Union.

== Business line ==
The airport offers VIP and corporate charter services, aircraft management services, ground handling and fixed-base operation services, hangar services, aircraft sales, oil and gas producers services.

== Premiair subsidiaries ==
Premiair has several subsidiaries:

- PT. Wira Jasa Angkasa (WJA), focusing io aircraft maintenance and supplies
- PT. Wira Adirajasa Dirgantara (WAD), focusing its business on fixed-base operations
- PT. Mitra Adirajasa Dirgantara (MAD), focusing on aviation consultancy and advising
