= Nurman Avia =

Airline based in Jakarta, Indonesia

IATA	ICAO	Call sign
-	NIN	NURVINDO
- Founded: 1997
- Ceased operations: 2007
- Hubs: Soekarno-Hatta International Airport
- Fleet size: 1 (at closure)
- Headquarters: Jakarta, Indonesia

PT Nurman Avia Indopura was an airline based in Jakarta, Indonesia. It operated passenger and cargo charters out of Soekarno-Hatta International Airport, Jakarta.

== History ==
The airline was established in 1997 as a sister company to HeavyLift Indonesia, operating charter flights on behalf of Bouraq Indonesia Airlines and Sempati Air. In 2007, the airline was shut down.

== Fleet ==
As of March 2007 the Nurman Avia fleet included the following aircraft:

1. Fokker F28 Mk4000
