= List of aviation accidents and incidents in Indonesia =

This is a list of aviation accidents and incidents in Indonesia.

== Death toll (50 fatalities or more) ==
=== Table key ===
Table key (deaths, type)
Column	Abbreviation	Definition
Deaths	Tot	Total
Deaths	C	Crew
Deaths	P	Passenger
Deaths	G	Ground
Deaths	N	Notes
Deaths	†	No survivors
Deaths	‡	No occupants
Deaths	1*	Sole survivor
T abv. for Type	COM	Commercial (accident/incident)
T abv. for Type	MIL	Military (accident/incident)
T abv. for Type	INB	Bombing
T abv. for Type	INH	Hijacking
T abv. for Type	EXG	Attacked using ground-based weapons
T abv. for Type	EXS	Attacked by other aircraft

Table key (location, phase of flight)
Column	Abbreviation	Definition
Location	(none)	< 20 km (12.5 mi)
Location	"off"	< 20 km (12.5 mi) (water impact)
Location	"near"	20 km (12.5 mi) to 50 km (31 mi)
Location	"area of"	> 50 km (31 mi)
Phase	STD	Standing
Phase	TXI	Taxi
Phase	TOF	Take off
Phase	ICL	Initial climb
Phase	ENR	En route
Phase	MNV	Maneuvering
Phase	APR	Approach
Phase	LDG	Landing
Phase	UNK	Unknown
Airport	***	Active or decommissioned military bases; closed/reassigned civil airports

=== Table ===
List of aircraft accidents and incidents resulting in 50 or more fatalities in Indonesia. Initial sort order is by total fatalities (descending) and then by date (most recent to most distant).
Deaths					T	Incident (Note: In cases where specific flight numbers do not exist or are not provided in supporting records, the aircraft's registration number appears in parentheses.)	Aircraft	Location	Phase	Airport	Distance	Date
Tot	C	P	G	N	T	Incident	Aircraft	Location	Phase	Airport	Distance	Date
234	14	220	0	†	COM	Garuda Indonesia Flight 152	Airbus A300B4-220	near Medan, Indonesia	APR	MES	32 km (20 mi)	1997-09-26
189	8	181	0	†	COM	Lion Air Flight 610	Boeing 737 MAX 8	Java Sea, near Karawang Regency, Indonesia	ENR	CGK		2018-10-29
162	7	155	0	†	COM	Indonesia AirAsia Flight 8501	Airbus A320-216	Karimata Strait, between Belitung and Borneo, Java Sea, Indonesia	ENR	SUB		2014-12-28
149	5	95	49		COM	Mandala Airlines Flight 91	Boeing 737-230	Medan, Indonesia	ICL	MES	c. 1 km (0.6 mi)	2005-09-05
139	12	109	22	†	MIL	Indonesian Air Force (A-1310)	Lockheed C-130 Hercules	Medan, Indonesia	ICL	MES	1 km (0.6 mi)	2015-06-30
135	12	121	2	1*	MIL	Indonesian Air Force (A-1324)	Lockheed C-130H-30 Hercules	East Jakarta, Indonesia	ICL	HLP	3 km (1.9 mi)	1991-10-05
107	11	96	0	†	COM	Pan Am Flight 812	Boeing 707-321B	area of Negara, Bali, Indonesia	APR	DPS	68 km (42 mi)	1974-04-22
104	7	97	0	†	COM	SilkAir Flight 185	Boeing 737-36N	Musi River, Indonesia	ENR	CGK		1997-12-19
102	6	96	0	†	COM	Adam Air Flight 574	Boeing 737-4Q8	Makassar Strait, Indonesia	ENR	MDC		2007-01-01
99	(Note: It is not known how many passengers or crew were killed in the incident. However, it is known that there were 112 people on the aircraft, including 98 passengers and 14 crew.)	(Note: It is not known how many passengers or crew were killed in the incident. However, it is known that there were 112 people on the aircraft, including 98 passengers and 14 crew.)	2		MIL	Indonesian Air Force (A-1325)	Lockheed C-130H Hercules	near Madiun, Indonesia	APR	MDN	9 km (5.6 mi)	2009-05-20
70	7	63	0	†	COM	Mandala Airlines Flight 660	Vickers Viscount 816	Mt. Lalaboy, Ambon Island, Indonesia	APR	AMQ	15 km (9.3 mi)	1992-07-24
69	7	62	0	†	COM	Merpati Nusantara Airlines (PK-MVS)	Vickers Viscount 828	Mentawai Strait, off Padang, Indonesia	ENR	WIMG		1971-11-10
62	12	50	0	†	COM	Sriwijaya Air Flight 182	Boeing 737-524	Java Sea, near Thousand Islands	ENR	CGK		2021-01-09
61	4	57	0	†	COM	Garuda Indonesia (PK-GVE)	Fokker F28-1000 Fellowship	Mount Sibayak, Berastagi, Indonesia	ENR	MES		1979-07-11
58	9	49	0		COM	KLM Flight 844	Lockheed 1049E	Biak Island, Indonesia	ENR	BIK		1957-07-16
54	5	49	0	†	COM	Trigana Air Flight 267	ATR 42-300	Mount Tangok, Oksibil District, Pegunungan Bintang Regency, Papua, Indonesia	ENR	OKL		2015-08-16

=== Notes regarding table data columns ===
==== Deaths ====
- Total (Tot): The total number of fatalities associated with the accident or incident.
- Crew (C): The number of crew fatalities.1
- Passenger (P): The number of passenger fatalities.
- Ground (G): The number of ground (non-flying) fatalities.
- Notes (N): The presence of a cross (†) denotes that all passengers and crew were killed. The presence of a one with an asterisk (1*) indicates the accident or incident had a sole survivor.

==== Type ====
Occurrences have been coded to allow for identification and sorting by group membership (accidents and related incidents versus attacks).

===== Accidents and related incidents =====
- "COM": Commercial aircraft
- "MIL": Military aircraft

Any collision between a commercial and military aircraft is coded COM.

===== Attacks and related incidents =====
- "INB": Internal attack involving a pre-planned bomb (without hijacking).
- "INH": Internal attack to commandeer of aircraft. Use of weapons (including a bomb or other explosives) for this purpose is coded in this category.
- "EXG": External attack originating on the ground (e.g., ground to air missiles, destruction of the aircraft while on the runway).
- "EXS": External attack originating in the sky (e.g., intentional downing by a military aircraft).

(Note: Categories adapted from RAND Corporation aviation research.)

==== Location ====
To provide some indication of distance between the site and the nearest location, the following three descriptors are applied:

- none: No descriptor appears before the location name. The site was within 20 km (12.5 mi) of the location.
- "off": Used only for those aquatic crash sites within 20 km (12.5 mi) of the location.
- "near": The site was approximately 20 km to 50 km (12.5 mi to 31 mi) from the location.
- "area of": The crash site was over 50 km (31 mi) from the location provided.

The names of occurrence locations are based on their present-day names.

==== Phases of flight ====
The phases of flight are those defined by the joint Commercial Aviation Safety Team/ICAO Common Taxonomy Team.

- Standing (STD): Prior to pushback/taxi, after gate arrival, or stationary and parked.
- Taxi (TXI): Moving under own power, prior to takeoff or after landing.
- Take off (TOF): Initiation of takeoff power, pulling back on controls, through to 10 m (35 ft) altitude.
- Initial climb (ICL): End of TOF to the first of: initial prescribed power reduction, 300 m (1000 ft) altitude, or VFR pattern.
- En route (ENR): End of ICL, through descent, to initial approach (IFR) or 300 m (1000 ft) above runway elevation (VFR).
- Maneuvering (MNV): Only for low altitude flight (observation, photography) or aerobatics.
- Approach (APR): From IAF or 300 m (1000 ft) elevation to landing flare.
- Landing (LDG): Landing flare through to exit from runway.
- Unknown (UNK): Unable to determine phase of flight.

==== Airports and distance ====
Airports associated with occurrences at all phases of flight (except ENR) are represented by their three-letter IATA airport code. In some cases, no IATA code is reported/assigned in which case the four-letter ICAO code is used. In rare instances (e.g., active or decommissioned military bases or closed airports whose civil codes have been reassigned), no codes exist. These airports are represented with three asterisks "***" in place of letters. Distance from the point of impact to the airport runway is provided for occurrences during the initial climb (ICL) and approach (APR) phases. On occasion, distance is provided for occurrences during takeoff (TOF) and landing (LDG) if the aircraft impacted within the aerodrome, but not on the runway.

== 1930s ==
- 6 October 1937: a KLM Douglas DC-3-194B "Specht" (PH-ALS) crashed just after takeoff from Talang Betoetoe Airport, killing four of 12 on board. The number one engine failed, causing a fire. Although the pilot cut fuel to the engine, the aircraft could not gain altitude on the remaining engine.

== 1940s ==
- 22 January 1940: a KNILM Lockheed 14-WF62 Super Electra (PK-AFO) lost altitude after takeoff from Denpasar Airport in Bali and crashed into the Indian Ocean after a wingtip struck the water, killing 8 occupants and leaving only 1 survivor.
- 6 December 1941: Dutch Navy Consolidated PBY-5 Catalina Y-44 crashed at Tandjong Pandan, killing five.
- 29 December 1941: a KNILM Douglas DC-3-194B "Nandoe" (PK-ALN) was destroyed on the ground by Japanese fighters while parked at Polonia Airport.
- 29 December 1941: a BOAC Short Empire Mk.I "Cassiopeia" (G-ADUX) crashed on takeoff off Sabang after it struck debris, killing four.
- 30 January 1942: a Qantas (leased from Imperial Airways) Short Empire "Corio" (G-AEUH) was shot down by seven Japanese Mitsubishi A6M Zero aircraft and crashed 3 nmi from the mouth of the Noelmini River; 13 of 18 on board died in the attack.
- 3 March 1942: a KNILM Douglas DC-3-194B "Pelikaan" (PK-AFV) was attacked and shot down by three Japanese Mitsubishi A6M2 Zero aircraft, whom returning to base after attacking Broome in Western Australia, causing the evacuation flight from Bandung to force-land at Carnot Bay, 90 kilometers north of Broome; three passengers and one crew member (J.F.M. Blaauw, mechanic) died during a later strafing attack.
- August 1943: an Imperial Japanese Airways Nakajima L2D (J-BIOA) was shot down near Sulawesi.
- 24 January 1945: an Imperial Japanese Airways Nakajima L2D (J-BKOA) disappeared between Denpasar and Surabaya.
- 29 July 1947: an Orissa State Government Douglas C-47B (VT-CLA) was shot down by a Royal Dutch East Indies Air Force Curtiss P-40. The C-47 went into a dive, crashing into trees and later into rice paddies in Ngoto, Bantul and broke up, killing eight of nine on board; only the tail remained intact. The C-47 was chartered by the Indonesian government to deliver Malayan Red Cross supplies. Dutch authorities claimed that they were not informed of the flight and that the aircraft had no Red Cross markings.
- 25 October 1948: a Pacific Overseas Airlines C-47 (HS-PC103) crashed off Sumatra; the aircraft was probably shot down by Dutch pilots.
- 2 December 1949: a Bataafse Petroleum Maatschappij (BPM) Boeing-Canada Canso B (PK-AKC) crashed on landing at Muntok Bay during a survey flight, killing six of 11 on board.

== 1950s ==
- 17 November 1950: a Garuda Indonesian Airways Douglas C-47A-65-DL (DC-3) overran the runway into a ditch while landing at Juanda Airport, killing 2 crew aboard, while 20 passengers and a crew member survived.
- 11 April 1955: An Air India Lockheed L-749A Constellation was en route from Hong Kong to Jakarta when it exploded in mid-air and crashed into the waters off the coast of the Natuna Islands; 16 people were killed in the crash and three survived. A time bomb had been placed on the aircraft in an attempt to assassinate Chinese Premier Zhou Enlai.
- 16 July 1957: KLM Flight 844 was taking off from Biak Airport in Dutch New Guinea when it plunged into Cenderawasih Bay. Out of 68 people on board, only 10 people survived the accident. The cause of the crash was never determined.
- 24 December 1959: Garuda Indonesian Airways Flight 330, a Douglas C-47A-25DK operating a flight from Palembang to Pangkal Pinang, crashed in a swamp while returning to Palembang following engine failure; killing the captain.

== 1960s ==
- 24 January 1961: Garuda Indonesian Airways Flight 424, a Douglas C-47A (PK-GDI), struck the western slope of Mount Burangrang, (15 km north of Bandung), killing all 21 occupants aboard. The DC-3 took off from Jakarta for a flight to Bandung, Yogyakarta and Surabaya; wreckage was found four days later.
- 3 February 1961: Garuda Indonesian Airways Flight 542 Douglas C-47 went missing while flying over the Java Sea. All 5 crew and 21 passengers on board were believed to have perished.
- 3 September 1964: An Indonesian Air Force C-130B Hercules (T-1307), piloted by Lt Col Djalaludin Tantu, crashed into the Strait of Malacca while trying to evade interception by a Royal Air Force Gloster Javelin during Operation Dwikora. The aircraft were carrying 47 Pasukan Gerak Tjepat troops.
- 16 September 1965: An Indonesian Air Force C-130B Hercules (T-1306), piloted by Maj Soehardjo and Capt Erwin Santoso, was shot down by an AA gun of the Indonesian Army in a friendly fire incident while trying to land at Long Bawan airfield, then in East Kalimantan. The pilot managed to land the burning aircraft on an open field. The aircraft was carrying 36 RPKAD troops. At least 17 crew and passengers were saved.
- 1 January 1966: The first known mid air collision in Indonesia, two Garuda Indonesian Airways C-47As collided in mid-air near Palembang, killing all 34 on board both aircraft.
- 16 February 1967: Garuda Indonesian Airways Flight 708 crashed on landing at Manado due to pilot error, killing 22 of 92 on board.

== 1970s ==
=== 1971 ===
- 10 November: A Merpati Nusantara Vickers Viscount 828 (PK-MVS) "Sabang" crashed into the sea 75 miles (121 km) off Sumatra killing all 69 people on board.

=== 1972 ===
- 5 April: a Merpati Nusantara Vickers Viscount was the subject of an attempted hijacking. The hijacker was killed.

=== 1973 ===
- 28 February: A Merpati Nusantara Airlines DHC-6 crashed into terrain near Nabire, Papua, killing all 13 on board.

=== 1974 ===
- 22 April: Pan Am Flight 812 crashed into a hillside at Grogek, North Bali. The flight was a scheduled international flight from Hong Kong to Sydney, Australia, with an intermediate stop at Denpasar, Bali, Indonesia. All of the 96 passengers and 11 crew on board were killed.
- 7 September: a Garuda Indonesian Airways Fokker F-27 PK-GFJ 'Semeru' crashed on approach to Tanjung Karang-Branti Airport. The aircraft crashed short of the runway while on approach in limited visibility. The aircraft eventually struck buildings near the runway and caught fire. 33 out of 36 people on board perished.

=== 1975 ===
- 24 September 1975: Garuda Indonesian Airways Flight 150 crashed on approach to Palembang Airport. The accident, which was attributed to poor weather and fog, killed 25 out of 61 passengers and one person on the ground.

=== 1976 ===
- 4 November 1976: a Bali International Air Service Fokker F-27 was landing at Banjarmasin Airport when one of its propellers auto-feathered due to crew error. The plane crashed into the side of the runway and burst into flames. 29 out of 38 people on board were killed in the crash.

=== 1977 ===
- 7 February 1977: a Merpati Nusantara Douglas C-47A PK-NDH was damaged beyond economic repair in a landing accident at Tanjung Santan Airport.
- 29 March 1977: A Merpati Nusantara DHC-6 Twin Otter stalled and crashed into the woods in Sulawesi after the pilot made an erroneous maneuver to evade an imminent collision with terrain. 13 people out of 23 people on board were killed.

=== 1978 ===
- 5 October 1978: A Merpati Nusantara Douglas C-47A (PK-NDI) burned out while parked at Ngurah Rai International Airport, Bali.

=== 1979 ===
- 11 July 1979: a Garuda Indonesian Airways Fokker F-28 on a domestic flight hit a volcano on approach to Polonia Airport, Medan, Indonesia. All 61 people on board were killed.

== 1980s ==
=== 1980 ===
- 23 January: a Pelita Air Service CASA C-212 Aviocar carrying 13 passengers and crews crashed onto a hill after being cleared to descent to 4,500 ft while on approach to Jakarta. All aboard were killed.
- 26 August: a Bouraq Indonesia Airlines Vickers Viscount 812 carrying 37 passengers and crews was en route to Jakarta's Kemayoran Airport when a sudden shaking caused the pilots to issue a mayday call. The plane's right elevator malfunctioned and the aircraft turned to the left. The right elevator then detached from the plane and the plane went out of control. It crashed onto the ground in Karawang, killing all aboard. The investigation concluded that a fracture on the plane's spigot caused the elevator to fail.

=== 1981 ===
- 12 January: a Garuda Indonesian Airways Douglas DC-10-30 PK-GIB overran the runway on landing at Ujung Pandang Airport, Sulawesi and was substantially damaged. The aircraft subsequently returned to service.
- 28 March: Garuda Indonesian Airways Flight 206, a McDonnell Douglas DC-9-32, PK-GNJ "Woyla", was hijacked on a domestic flight from Palembang to Medan by five heavily armed hijackers. The hijackers diverted the flight to Penang, and then to Bangkok. The hijackers demanded the release of 84 political prisoners in Indonesia. On the third day of the hijacking (31 March 1981) the airplane parked in Bangkok Don Muang International Airport was stormed by Indonesian commandos. One of the commandos was shot, probably by his comrades, as was the pilot, also probably by Indonesian commandos. The rest of the hostages were released unharmed. Two of the hijackers surrendered to the Thai commandos, but they were killed by the Indonesian commandos on the plane taking them back to Jakarta.

=== 1982 ===
- 20 March: a Garuda Indonesian Airways Fokker F-28 on a domestic flight overran the runway at Tanjung Karang-Branti Airport in bad weather. The aircraft subsequently burst into flames killing all 27 people on board.
- 24 June: British Airways Flight 9 from Kuala Lumpur to Perth, flew into a cloud of volcanic ash thrown up by the eruption of Mount Galunggung in West Java while flying over Indian Ocean, resulting in the failure of all four engines. The aircraft was diverted to Jakarta while gliding out the ash cloud. All engines were successfully restarted, although one failed again soon after, allowing the aircraft to land safely at the Halim Perdanakusuma Airport in Jakarta.

=== 1983 ===
- 2 June: a Garuda Indonesian Airways Fokker F-28 was taking off from Tanjung-Karang Branti Airport, when it failed to lift off as a result of a crew error and overran the runway by 138 meters; killing 3 passengers.

=== 1984 ===
- 30 December: a Garuda Indonesian Airways DC-9-30 (flight 409) on a domestic flight touched down too late and overran through a ditch, trees and a fence at Ngurah Rai International Airport. The aircraft broke in 3 and caught fire. All 75 on board survived, but 14 were injured 5 seriously.

=== 1985 ===
- 21 November: an Indonesian Air Force C-130H Hercules (A-1322) crashed into Mount Sibayak in North Sumatra. The aircraft crashed while flying from Medan to Padang. All 10 crew were killed.

=== 1986 ===
- 3 October: a Short SC.7 Skyvan operated by charter airline East Indonesia Air Taxi carrying 13 passengers and crews crashed onto Mount Takawirang while on approach to Manado's Sam Ratulangi Airport in North Sulawesi. All aboard were killed.

=== 1987 ===
- 4 April: Garuda Indonesia Flight 035, a Douglas DC-9-30, struck power lines and crashed short of the runway at Polonia International Airport due to possible windshear, killing 23 of 45 on board.
- 30 November: a Merpati Nusantara Airlines de Havilland Canada DHC-6 Twin Otter, named as Serui, carrying 17 passengers and crew members crashed while en route to Berau Regency in East Kalimantan. All aboard were killed.

=== 1989 ===
- 15 September: a Merpati Nusantara Airlines DHC-6 crashed while on approach to Bintuni's Steenkool Airport, killing all 22 passengers and crew on board.

== 1990s ==
=== 1990 ===
- 2 January: a CASA C-212 Aviocar operated by Pelita Air Service suffered an engine failure shortly after taking off from Jakarta's Halim Perdanakusuma Airport. The overloaded condition of the plane made it difficult to turn back to Jakarta. The aircraft was forced to ditch in the Java Sea. The plane touched down at Banten Bay and sank. At least 9 out of 16 people on board were killed in the incident.
- 25 January: a Hawker Siddeley HS 748 operated by regional airliner Airfast Indonesia carrying 19 passengers and crews struck Mount Rinjani while on approach to Mataram Selaparang Airport. All aboard were killed.

=== 1991 ===
- 9 May: Merpati Nusantara Airlines Flight 7533, the Fokker F-27 plane was carrying 13 passengers and crew members when it struck Mount Klabat during its approach to Sam Ratulangi Airport in Manado, North Sulawesi in bad weather. All aboard were killed in the accident.
- 5 October: an Indonesian Air Force C-130H Hercules (A-1324), piloted by Maj Syamsul Aminullah and Capt Bambang Soegeng, crashed into a building in Condet, East Jakarta. The aircraft were carrying 123 Paskhas troops that just took part in Indonesian National Armed Forces Day celebration in Jakarta. The crash killed 136 people, consisting of 12 crew, 123 troops and a security guard on the ground.
- 25 October: a Bali International Air Service Britten-Norman Trislander carrying 17 passengers and crews went missing above the Bornean jungle while circling over Sampit in Central Kalimantan.

=== 1992 ===
- 24 July: Mandala Airlines Flight 660 – PK-RVU, a Vickers Viscount 816, was flying from Makassar, South Sulawesi to Ambon, Maluku. Suddenly a strong gust of wind from above caused the plane to lose altitude rapidly. It slammed into the side of Inahau Hill in Mount Lalaboy. All 70 people on board perished. Investigators concluded the strong wind and pilot error were the cause of the crash.
- 18 October 1992: Merpati Nusantara Airlines Flight 5601, an IPTN/CASA CN-235-10 (PK-MNN) struck the side of Mount Papandayan while on approach to Bandung, killing all 31 people on board. The plane lost contact with control tower while above Mount Puntang. A search and rescue team found the debris of the plane and no survivors. Merpati's sole female pilot was among the dead.

=== 1993 ===
- 9 January: a Bouraq Airlines Hawker Siddeley HS 748 carrying 44 passengers and crews crashed onto a swamp shortly after taking off from Surabaya's Juanda International Airport after the crews reported a malfunction on one of the plane's engines. At least 15 people were killed in the crash.
- 31 January: a Short SC.7 Skyvan operated by Pan Malaysian Air Transport carrying 16 passengers and crew members went missing above northern Sumatra while en route to Banda Aceh, Aceh. The wreckage was found approximately 17 years later by the Indonesian police. No survivors were found.
- 1 July: Merpati Nusantara Airlines Flight 724, a Fokker F28 Friendship, smashed into a hill and impacted on water after the crew lost control of the plane whilst on final approach to Jefman Airport in Sorong, Papua. 41 people were killed.

=== 1994 ===
- 25 April: a Dirgantara Air Service Britten-Norman BN-2 Islander carrying 11 passengers and crews crashed onto Mount Saran Kayulapis in West Kalimantan while on approach to Nanga Pinoh Airport in Melawi Regency. Only one person survived.
- 18 June:, a Merpati Nusantara Airlines Fokker F27 carrying 12 passengers and crews crashed onto a mountain at an altitude of 2,295 ft while on approach to Palu's Mutiara Airport in Central Sulawesi. All aboard were killed.
- 30 November: Merpati Nusantara Airlines Flight 422, a Fokker F28 overran the runway at Achmad Yani International Airport with no casualties among the 85 on board.

=== 1995 ===
- 10 January: Merpati Nusantara Airlines Flight 6715, a de Havilland Canada DHC-6 (PK-NUK) "Sangihe", disappeared over the Molo Strait between Flores and Rinca islands. All 14 people on board were presumed dead.
- 9 August: a Bouraq Indonesia Airlines Hawker Siddeley HS 748 carrying 13 passengers and crews crashed onto Mount Kumawa during its descent to Kaimana Airport in Kaimana, Papua. All on board were killed in the crash.

=== 1996 ===
- 7 December: Dirgantara Air Service Flight 5940, a CASA C-212 Aviocar was taking off from Banjarmasin when one of its engine suddenly malfunctioned. The pilot had attempted to return to airport. However, it failed to reach its intended destination and crashed into an industrial factory, killing 18 people including 3 on the ground. 1 passenger survived the crash.

=== 1997 ===
- 10 March: Indonesian Air Force, F-16A Fighting Falcon with tail number TS-1607 part of the Elang Biru aerobatic team crashed in Halim Perdanakusuma International Airport in Jakarta while attempting to land during bad weather. The pilot was killed.
- 19 April: Merpati Nusantara Airlines Flight 106 – The plane was on approach to Buluh Tumbang Airport in Belitung when it suddenly stalled and banked to the left. It then crashed into the ground, killing 15 people. Investigators concluded pilot error was the cause of the accident.
- 17 July: Sempati Air Flight 304 – A Fokker F27 crashed onto a residential area near Bandung after one of its engines caught fire and failed in flight. 28 people were killed.
- 26 September: Garuda Indonesia Flight 152, an Airbus A300B4-220 flying from Jakarta to Medan, crashed in Sibolangit, 18 miles (29 km) short of Medan airport in low visibility, killing all 234 people on board. The plane impacted terrain due to ATC error, and didn't aware that the plane was in close proximity to terrain as there were no visual references due to 1997 Southeast Asian haze. It is the deadliest aviation incident in Indonesia.
- 19 December: SilkAir Flight 185, operated by a Boeing 737-300 plunged into the Musi River in Sumatra during a routine flight from Jakarta to Singapore, killing all 104 people on board. The US NTSB concluded that the crash resulted from an intentional act by a pilot, most likely the captain. NTSB stated that the plane crashed due to suicide by pilot, while Indonesian investigators couldn't determined the cause as because of lack of evidence. The Los Angeles County Superior Court suggested that the cause of crash was due to rudder failure.

== 2000s ==
=== 2000 ===
- 18 November: Dirgantara Air Service Flight 3130 failed to take off from Datah Dawai Airport in East Kalimantan and crashed into a nearby forest due to overloading. No passengers or crew were killed however everyone was injured. Investigation found an astonishing fact that the pilot voluntarily endangered the occupants by accepting bribes to let a handful of passengers board the already fully loaded aircraft.

=== 2001 ===
- 20 December: an Indonesian Air Force L-100 Hercules (A-1329), piloted by Capt Rida Hermawan, overshoot the runway and then burned while landing on Malikus Saleh Airport in Aceh. The aircraft were carrying 80 passengers. There were no fatalities in this incident.

=== 2002 ===
- 14 January: Lion Air Flight 386, a Boeing 737-200 crashed on take-off and was written off at Sultan Syarif Kasim II International Airport. Everyone on board survived.
- 16 January: Garuda Indonesia Flight 421 en route from Lombok to Yogyakarta was forced to make an emergency landing in poor weather on the Bengawan Solo River, due to an engine flameout caused by water and hail ingestion. In the process, the cabin floor suddenly ripped, causing two flight attendants to be sucked out. One person, a stewardess, was killed in the accident. The remaining 59 people survived.
- 28 March: two Indonesian Air Force Hawk Mk.53s from 15th Air Squadron collided mid air during an aerobatic exercise at Iswahyudi Air Force Base, East Java. The Hawk TT-5310 piloted by Capt Andis Solichin and Capt Weko Nartomo while TT-5311 piloted by Maj Syahbudin Nur Hutasuhut and Capt Masrial. Both aircraft collided while doing victory roll maneuver during an exercise.
- 16 July: a Britten-Norman BN-2 Islander operated by Sabang Merauke Raya Air Charter crashed onto a mountain near Nunukan while approaching Long Bawang Airport. A total of 9 passengers and crews on board were killed in the crash. The sole survivor, Bangau, managed to walk through the forest for 5 days before finally being found by local villagers.
- 7 November: a Britten-Norman BN-2 Islander operated by Dirgantara Air Services crashed onto a swamp after a reported in-flight engine failure, shortly after taking off from Tarakan's Juwata Airport. At least 7 people on board were killed and 3 others survived the crash.

=== 2004 ===
- 7 September: human rights activist Munir Said Thalib was murdered on Garuda Indonesia Flight 974. Garuda's CEO at the time, Indra Setiawan, his deputy Rohainil Aini, and pilot Pollycarpus Priyanto were all convicted of his murder. Garuda was found negligent in refusing to perform an emergency landing and was ordered to pay compensation to Munir's widow. The airline then failed to pay the compensation.
- 30 November: Lion Air Flight 583, a McDonnell Douglas MD-82, was landing during a rainy condition at Adisumarmo International Airport when it overran the runway and crashed onto an embankment and a cemetery. 25 people died.

=== 2005 ===
- 1 April: a DHC-6 Twin Otter operated by Germania Trisila (GT) Air went missing above the Papuan jungle just 10 minutes after taking off from Timika Airport with 14 passengers and 3 crew members. Search and rescue team eventually found the wreckage of the plane 5 days later at a ravine with no survivors.
- 21 July: an Indonesian Air Force CN-235 (A-2301) crashed while on landing approach to Malikus Saleh Airport, Aceh. 3 Indonesian Army officers were killed, while 11 passengers including 2 flight crew were seriously injured.
- 5 September: Mandala Airlines Flight 91 shook violently, stalled and crashed into a residential neighborhood in Medan, North Sumatra. A total of 149 people were killed in Indonesia's deadliest air disaster involving ground fatalities. Flight crew took-off with flaps and slats retracted.

=== 2006 ===
- 11 February: Adam Air Flight 589A, registration number PK-kkx(c/n 23773), lost navigational and communications systems twenty minutes into a flight from Jakarta to Makassar, Sulawesi. The plane was subsequently flown into a radar "black spot" and was lost for several hours, eventually making an emergency landing at Tambolaka Airport, Sumba.
- 4 March: Lion Air Flight 8987, a McDonnell Douglas MD-82, crashed after landing at Juanda International Airport. Reverse thrust was used during landing, although the left thrust reverser was stated to be out of service. This caused the aircraft to veer to the right and skid off the runway, coming to rest about 7,000 feet (2,100 m) from the approach end of the runway. There were no fatalities, but the aircraft was badly damaged.
- 17 November: A Trigana Air Service de Havilland Canada DHC-6 carrying 12 passengers and crew members went missing above Papua while en route to Ilaga. The wreckage was eventually found on the next day, located in the mountainous Puncak Jaya region, with no survivors.
- 24 December: Lion Air Flight 792, a Boeing 737-400, landed with an incorrect flap configuration and was not aligned with the runway. The plane landed hard and skidded along the runway causing the right main landing gear to detach, the left gear to protrude through the wing and some of the aircraft fuselage to be wrinkled. There were no fatalities, but the aircraft was written off.

=== 2007 ===
- 1 January: ATC lost contact with Adam Air Flight 574 en route from Surabaya (SUB) to Manado (MDC). The aircraft, a Boeing 737-400 with registration code of PK-KKW (c/n 24070), had 96 passengers and 6 crew. On 10 January, parts of the aircraft's tail stabilizer were found 300 meters offshore in Makassar Strait. All 102 people were killed. The crash was attributed to pilot error after the pilots failed to properly fly the plane in response to the failure of the aircraft's inertial navigation system.

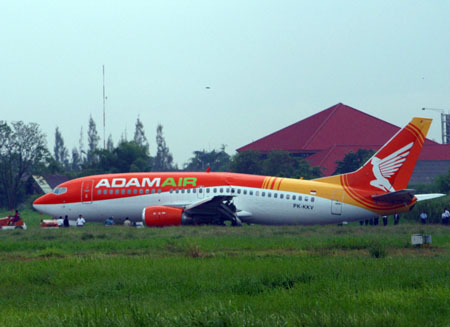
Adam Air Flight 172.

- 21 February: Adam Air Flight 172, a Boeing 737-300 aircraft flying from Jakarta to Surabaya with registration PK-KKV (c/n 27284), had a hard landing at Juanda International Airport. The incident caused the fuselage of the plane to crack and bend at the middle, with the tail of the plane drooping towards the ground. There were no reports of serious injuries from the incident.
- 7 March: Garuda Indonesia Flight 200, a Boeing 737-400 flying from Jakarta to Yogyakarta, bounced three times after suffering a hard landing at Adisucipto International Airport, Yogyakarta. The aircraft overran the runway and crashed onto a nearby embankment. 21 people were killed. Investigators found the pilot did not extend the flaps to the recommended position and was fixated on landing the aircraft immediately, even though it was traveling too fast.
- 28 June: Concerns on Indonesia's poor aviation safety record, particularly after the crash of Adam Air Flight 574 and Garuda Indonesia Flight 200 earlier in the year, caused the European Union to issue a ban on every Indonesian airliner from entering European airspace.

=== 2008 ===
- 10 March: an Adam Air Boeing 737-400 aircraft flying from Jakarta to Batam with registration PK-KKT (c/n 24353), skidded 75 metres off the end of the runway while landing in Batam. All passengers survived and two were treated for shock. The plane sustained damage to one wing.
- 26 June: an Indonesian Air Force NC-212-200 (A-2106) crashed into Mount Salak while en route from Halim Perdanakusuma International Airport to Atang Senjaya Airport. 13 passengers and 5 crew were killed.
- 27 August: Sriwijaya Air Flight 62, a Boeing 737-200 (PK-CJG) overran the runway when landing at Sultan Thaha Airport after a hydraulic leak caused the brakes to fail. A total of 26 people were injured, including one person on the ground who later succumbed to his injuries.

=== 2009 ===
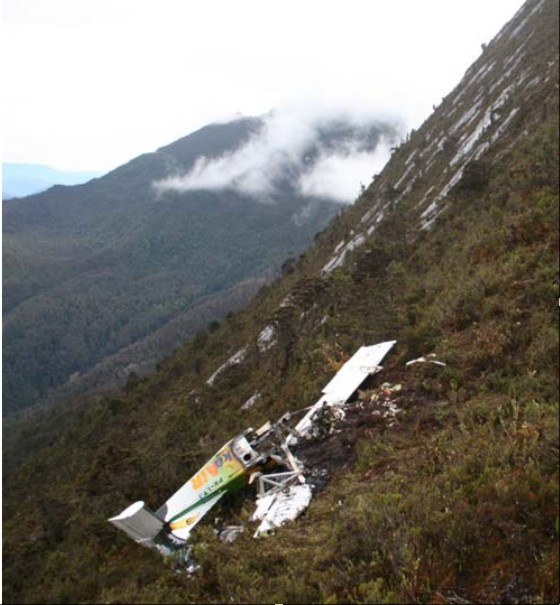
The wreckage of Mimika Air Flight 514, seen on the slope of Mt. Gergaji

- 23 February: Lion Air Flight 972, a McDonnell Douglas MD-82 landed without the nose gear at Hang Nadim International Airport, Batam.
- 9 March: Lion Air Flight 793, a McDonnell Douglas MD-90-30 (registration PK-LIL) ran off the runway at Soekarno–Hatta International Airport. No-one was injured.
- 6 April: an Indonesian Air Force Fokker F27-400M crashed into a hangar at Husein Sastranegara International Airport, Bandung. 6 crew and 18 passengers were killed.
- 17 April 2009: Mimika Air Flight 514, a Pilatus PC-6 Porter crashed upside down into Mount Gergaji in Papua due to pilot disorientation, killing all 11 people on board. Investigators blamed the pilot for the crash.
- 11 May: an Indonesian Air Force C-130B Hercules (A-1302) skidded off the runway as one of its landing gear is detached while landing at Wamena Airport, Papua. There were no fatalities, but two people were injured as the result of the accident.
- 20 May: an Indonesian Air Force L-100-30 Hercules (A-1325), piloted by Maj Danu Setiawan, crashed into paddy field near residential area in Magetan, East Java. The aircraft crashed while preparing to land at Iswahyudi Air Force Base. The aircraft were carrying Armed Forces members and their families. 98 passengers and 2 people on the ground were killed, while at least 15 people were injured.
- 2 August: Merpati Nusantara Airlines Flight 9760, a de Havilland Canada DHC-6 crashed on the island of New Guinea, about 14 miles (23 km) north of Oksibil. All 16 people on board were killed. Pilot error was blamed for the controlled flight into terrain (CFIT).
- 3 December: a Merpati Nusantara Fokker 100 PK-MJD made an emergency landing at El Tari Airport, Kupang when the left main gear failed to extend. There were no injuries among the passengers and crew.

== 2010s ==
=== 2010 ===
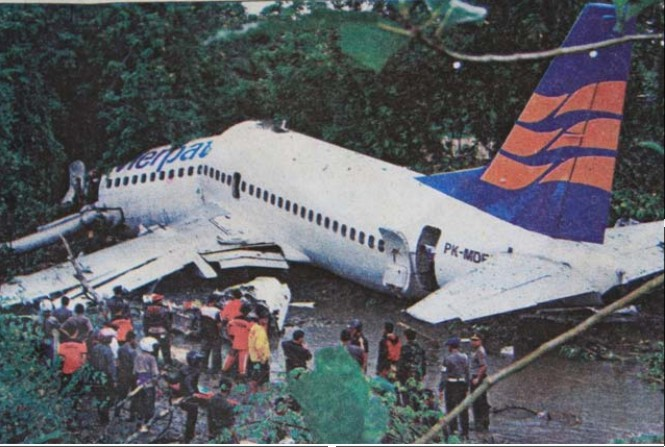
Merpati Flight 836 overran the runway in Manokwari, crashed and split into two in April 2010

- 13 April: Merpati Nusantara Airlines Flight 836 – A Boeing 737 overran the runway in Manokwari with 109 people on board. The plane impacted terrain and broke up into three pieces. All 109 people on board survived; 44 people suffered minor injuries.
- 2 November: Lion Air Flight 712, a Boeing 737-400 (registration PK-LIQ) overran the runway on landing at Supadio Airport, Pontianak, coming to rest on its belly and sustaining damage to its nose gear. All 174 passengers and crew evacuated by the emergency slides, with few injuries.

=== 2011 ===
- 7 May: Merpati Nusantara Airlines Flight 8968- a Merpati Nusantara Xian MA60 PK-MZK, operating on the Sorong-Kaimana route, crashed the sea while attempting to land at Kaimana Airport in Papua. The aircraft was on approach when it impacted water 500 meters from the runway. 25 people were killed in the incident. The Captain chose to abort landing and performed a sharp left turn. It was also revealed that the Captain did not retract the flaps properly causing the plane to lose altitude rapidly.
- 29 September: Nusantara Buana Air Flight 823 - As the aircraft flew low over Gunung Leuser National Park, the crews encountered a thick cloud. As there were no gaps in between, the pilots were forced to fly into the cloud. But without any visual reference, the plane lost altitude and impacted terrain. All 18 people were killed.
- 3 December: a Merpati Nusantara CASA C-212 Aviocar passenger plane sustained substantial damage in a landing accident at Larat-Watidar Airport. There were three crew members and 19 passengers on board. Two passengers suffered minor injuries.

=== 2012 ===
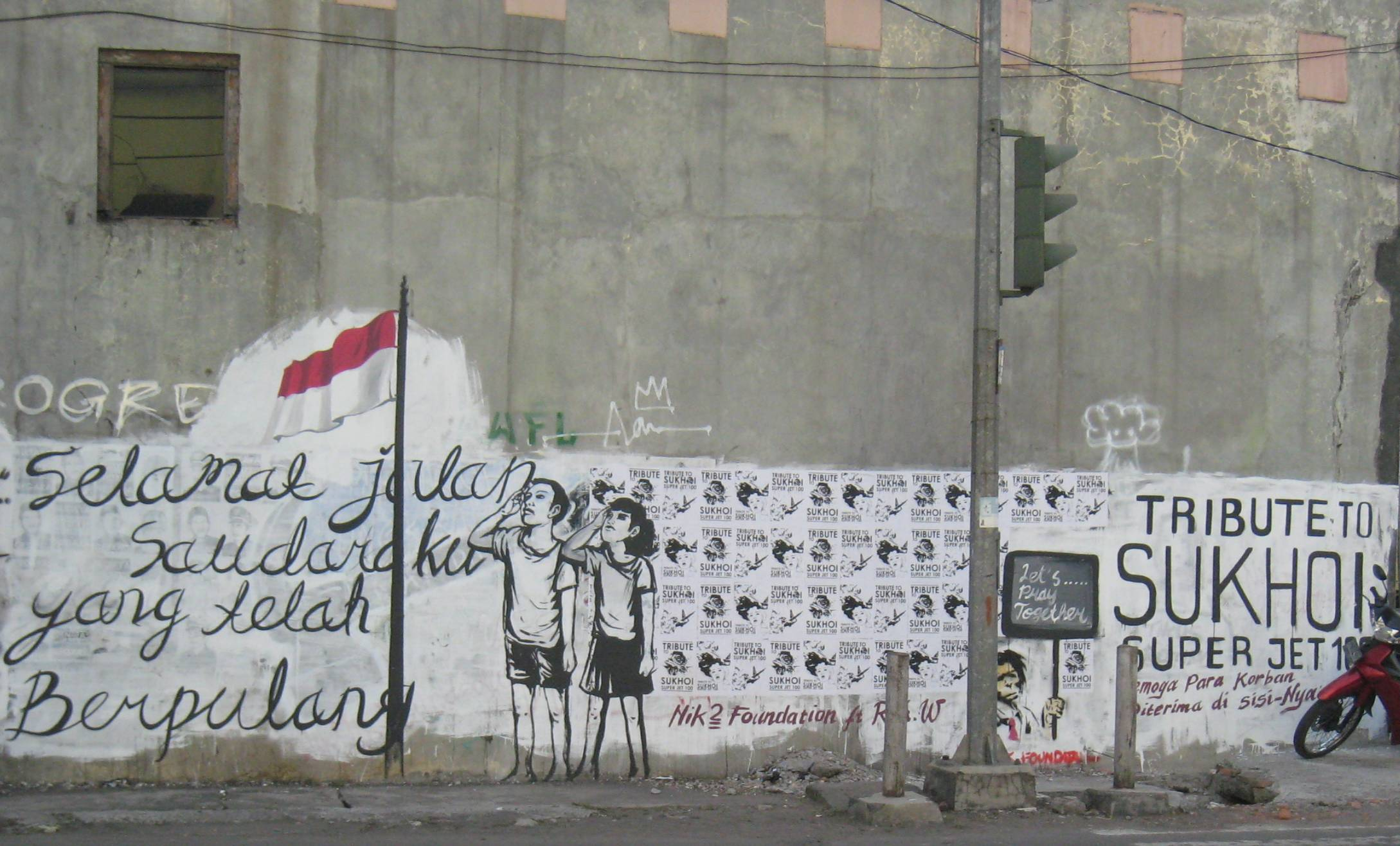
A graffiti in Solo regarding the Mount Salak Sukhoi Superjet 100 crash

- 9 May: a Sukhoi Superjet 100 aircraft crashed on a demonstration flight operating from Halim Perdanakusuma Airport, Jakarta. The aircraft hit the cliff in Mount Salak, a volcano in West Java, killing all 37 passengers and 8 crew aboard. The plane was on a demonstration flight, carrying potential customers and reporters. Final reports indicated that the crews ignored the Terrain Warning System. They thought that the warning system was broken so they turned off the warning system while engaging in a conversation with a potential customer. Unbeknownst to them that the plane was in extreme proximity with terrain.
- 21 June: an Indonesian Air Force Fokker F27 (A-2708) crashed into residential area near Halim Perdanakusuma International Airport, Jakarta. 11 people were killed, consisting of 7 occupants and 4 people on the ground. 11 people on the ground were also injured.

=== 2013 ===
- 13 April: Lion Air Flight 904, a Boeing 737-800 (registration PK-LKS; c/n 38728) from Bandung to Denpasar with 108 people on board, crashed into the water near Ngurah Rai International Airport, Bali, while attempting to land. The aircraft's fuselage broke into two parts. While Indonesian officials reported the aircraft crashed short of the runway, reporters and photographers from Reuters and the Associated Press indicated that the plane overshot the runway. All passengers and crew were evacuated from the aircraft and there were no fatalities.
- 10 June: a Xian MA60 PK-MZO, operating Merpati Nusantara Airlines Flight 6517 from Bajawa to Kupang with 50 people on board, crash-landed at Kupang airport in East Nusa Tenggara. Twenty five passengers were injured. The aircraft, which has been damaged beyond repair, lay on its belly on the runway with its engines jammed face down into the tarmac and its wings bent forward.
- 6 August: Lion Air Flight 892, a Boeing 737-800 (registration PK-LKH; c/n 37297) from Makassar to Gorontalo with 117 passengers and crew on board, collided into a cow in Jalaluddin Airport. All people on board survived.

=== 2014 ===
- 1 February: Lion Air Flight 361, a Boeing 737-900ER (registration PK-LFH; c/n 35710), from Balikpapan Sultan Aji Muhammad Sulaiman Airport to Ngurah Rai International Airport in Denpasar, Bali via Juanda International Airport in Surabaya, with 222 passengers and crew on board, landed hard and bounced four times on the runway, causing a tail strike and substantial damage to the plane. There were no casualties, but two passengers were seriously injured and three others had minor injuries.

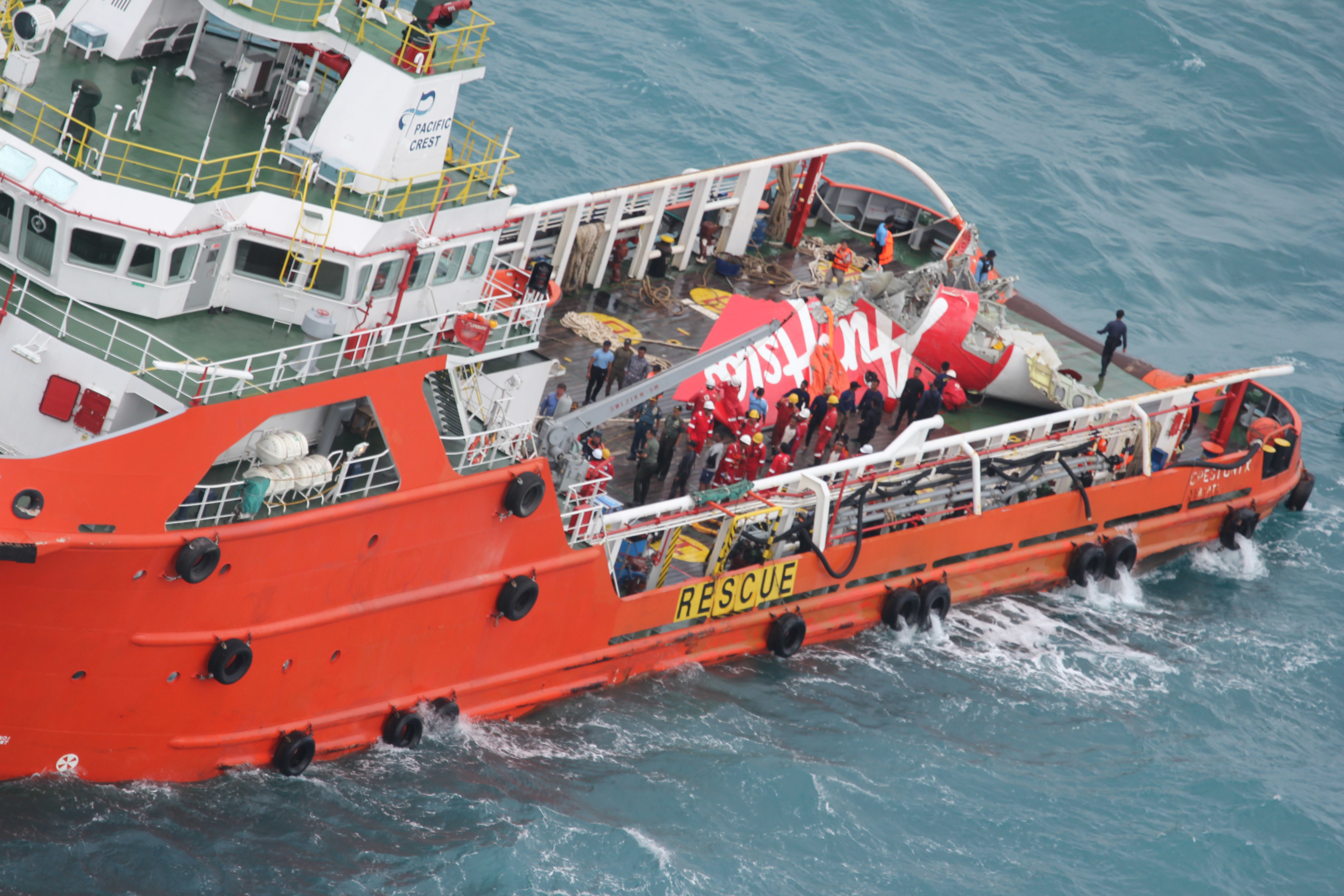
Tail section of Indonesia AirAsia Flight 8501

- 28 December: The Indonesia AirAsia Flight 8501 aircraft, operating the route from Surabaya to Singapore, crashed into the Java Sea during bad weather, killing all 155 passengers and seven crew on board. A little crack in a solder caused a significant electrical interruption to the rudder travel limiter. The crews tried to fix the problem, but just aggravated it as they pulled the circuit breakers off, causing the protection system to go off. Subsequent miscommunication later caused the plane to plunge into the Java Sea. It remains the third deadliest aviation accident in Indonesia.

=== 2015 ===
- 30 June: an Indonesian Air Force Lockheed C-130 Hercules crashed near a residential neighborhood with 12 crew and 109 passengers on board shortly after taking off from Medan, killing all aboard, along with 22 people on the ground.
- 16 August: Trigana Air Service Flight 267 – The ATR 42 was on final leg to Oksibil Airport when it suddenly slammed into Tangok Mountain, a few miles from the airport. Search and rescue teams found that none of the 54 people on board survived the crash. Both black boxes were retrieved by the National Transportation Safety Committee (KNKT). A preliminary report indicated the plane hit the terrain instantaneously, indicating a CFIT.

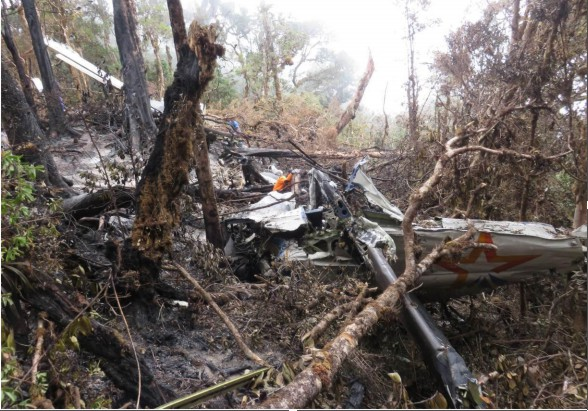
Crash site of Aviastar Flight 7503

- 2 October: Aviastar Flight 7503 – Missing over Sulawesi, SAR team later found debris in Latimojong Mountain and no survivors among the 10 people on board.

=== 2016 ===
- 4 April: Batik Air Flight 7703 – While taking off from Halim Perdanakusuma Airport in Jakarta, the Boeing 737-800's left wingtip collided with a towed (across the active runway) TransNusa Air Services ATR 42-600. The wingtip sliced off the ATR 42's left wing and vertical stabilizer, destroying it. The Boeing's left wing then caught fire. All passengers and crew were evacuated unharmed.
- 14 June: A Cessna Citation 208 Grand Caravan belonging to Associated Mission Aviation (AMA) crashed into three traditional honai houses in Papua. Seven people were injured, including the American pilot.
- 18 December: an Indonesian Air Force C-130H (A-1334) crashed into Mount Lisuwa while preparing to land at Wamena Airport, Papua. 13 people perished, consisting of 12 crew and a passenger.

=== 2017 ===
- 14 March: Indonesian Air Force – An F-16B Fighting Falcon with tail number TS-1603 skidded off the runway after a braking malfunctionin in Roesmin Nurjadin air force base in Pekanbaru, the aircraft was rolled over, destroying its vertical stabilizer and the canopy. Both pilots safe and the aircraft will be returned to service after being upgraded.

=== 2018 ===
- 29 October: Lion Air Flight 610 – Less than 15 minutes after taking off from Soekarno–Hatta International Airport, the Boeing 737 MAX 8 crashed into the Java Sea. 189 people were pronounced dead, making it the second-deadliest air disaster in the country's history.

=== 2019 ===
- 28 June: Indonesian Army – A military Mi-17 helicopter with registration number HA-5138 carrying twelve people crashed on a flight from Oksibil to Jayapura in Papua province, killing all on board and their military weapons and ammunitions were seized by the Free Papua Movement rebels.

== 2020s ==
=== 2020 ===
- 23 March: Indonesian Air Force - A CASA/IPTN CN-235 with registration number A-2909 cargo plane was shot with five bullets from an M-16 assault rifle by a faction of the Free Papua Movement while flying over Serambakon district in Oksibil, Bintang regency, Papua, from Sentani, Jayapura. The Free Papua Movement took responsibility through its spokesperson, Sebby Sambom.
- 12 May: Mission Aviation Fellowship – American pilot Joyce Chaisin Lin, 40, died when her plane malfunctioned while she was on her way to deliver COVID-19 rapid test kits to a remote village in Mamit Sentani, in Papua province, in a Quest Kodiak aircraft. She was a missionary with the Mission Aviation Fellowship, in an effort to bring test kits to the local clinic. Within minutes of takeoff, she reported an emergency but the aircraft fell into Lake Sentani.
- 6 June: Indonesian Army – A Russian-built Mi-17 helicopter of the Indonesian military on a training mission, about an hour after taking off from Semarang crashed into an industrial area in Kendal, Central Java, killing 4 people, five others were hospitalized with serious injuries.
- 15 June: Indonesian Air Force - A Hawk 209 registration TT-0209, piloted by 1st Lt Apriyanto, crashed into a residential area near Roesmin Nurjadin Air Force Base, Pekanbaru while on landing approach. The pilot ejected safely and there was no casualty.

=== 2021 ===
- 9 January: Sriwijaya Air Flight 182 - Shortly after taking off from Soekarno–Hatta International Airport, the Boeing 737-500 went missing and debris was later found amid the Kepulauan Seribu islands off Jakarta. All 62 passengers and crew on board were killed. The accident was caused by a loss of control during its climb as a result of autothrottle failure.
- 20 March: A Trigana Air Boeing 737-400, registration PK-YSF, had a landing gear issue while departing from Halim Perdanakusuma International Airport. When attempting to make an emergency landing, the landing gear collapsed, causing significant damage, and the plane skidded off the runway.
- 15 September: A Rimbun Air de Havilland DHC-6 Twin Otter operating a freight flight from Nabire to Intan Jaya, crashed into trees on approach to Intan Jaya in a heavy fog; all 3 crew members perished.
- 25 October: A Smart Air Cessna 208 Caravan crashed on landing at Ilaga Airport; killing one pilot.

=== 2022 ===
- 19 July: A KAI T-50 Golden Eagle with registration number TT-5009 owned by Indonesian Air Force crashed in Blora, Central Java. Two flight crew members were killed.
- 7 September: A Bonanza G-36 aircraft with registration number T-2503 belonging to the Indonesian Navy crashed in Madura Strait, East Java. Two flight crew members were killed.

=== 2023 ===
- 23 June: A Cessna 208 Caravan operated by Semuwa Aviasi Mandiri (SAM AIR) carrying four passengers and two crew members crashed in Yalimo Regency, Highland Papua. Killing all people on board.
- 16 November: Two Indonesian Air Force Embraer EMB 314 Super Tucanos crashed on the slopes of Mount Bromo, near Keduwung Village, Puspo District, Pasuruan, East Java. The aircraft (TT-3103 and TT-3111) were part of four-aircraft formation with another two Super Tucanos, and on training flight under cloudy weather conditions. The four aircraft were flying in a box formation when they suddenly encountered heavy clouds, obstructing visibility; TT-3103 and TT-3111 allegedly collided with a mountain slope when the four aircraft broke the formation and attempted to get out of the clouds. Another two Super Tucanos landed safely on Abdul Rachman Saleh Air Base. All four pilots of both planes died in the accident.

=== 2024 ===
- 8 March: A Pilatus PC-6 Turbo-Porter operated by Smart Cakrawala Aviation, crashed near Krayan Tengah District, North Kalimantan, killing the flight engineer and severely injuring the pilot aboard the plane. The flight was carrying food supplies to Binuang. Rescue teams were dispatched by the NTSC and the wreckage was located on 9th March and the captain was escorted safely.
- 19 May: A training plane Tecnam P2006T with registration PK-IFP had an air accident in the Sunburst Field area, Bumi Serpong Damai (BSD), Serpong District, South Tangerang, killing the three people on board. The cause of the trainer plane crash in BSD is still being investigated, suspected to be due to the weather.
- 20 October: A de Havilland Canada DHC-6 Twin Otter registered as PK-SMH, operated by SAM Air, crashed during a flight from Gorontalo-Jalaluddin to Bumi Panua Pohuwato killing all 4 people on board.

=== 2025 ===
- 3 August: A Quicksilver GT500 training aircraft, registered PK-S216, belonging to the Indonesian Aero Sport Federation (FASI), crashed in Ciampea District, Bogor, West Java. The aircraft had taken off from Atang Sendjaja Air Force Base in Bogor and then lost contact. The aircraft was carrying two people, a pilot and a passenger. The pilot, an Indonesian Air Force officer, reportedly died at the scene.

=== 2026 ===
- 17 January: An ATR 42-500 operated by Indonesia Air Transport carrying 3 passengers and seven crew members loses contact with air traffic control at about 1:17 local time 20 kilometres northeast of an airport close to Makassar. The wreckage has since been found through only one victim has been recovered.
- 27 January: A Smart Cakrawala Aviation Cessna 208 Caravan, registered PK-SNS, made an emergency landing on the shoreline of Nabire Airport in Central Papua after experiencing engine trouble shortly after takeoff. The aircraft was carrying 13 people, all of whom survived.

== See also ==
- Aviation in Indonesia
- List of accidents and incidents involving airliners by location
- List of disasters in Indonesia

== Notes ==
All accident and incident references to the Aviation Safety Network database are sub-pages of their main website, http://aviation-safety.net.
