= Medan International Airport =

Medan International Airport may refer to:

- Kualanamu International Airport, Medan, Indonesia
- Soewondo Air Force Base, Medan, Indonesia, previously commercial international airport Polonia International Airport
