= Pan Am Flight 812 =

1974 aviation accident in Indonesia

Pan American Flight 812
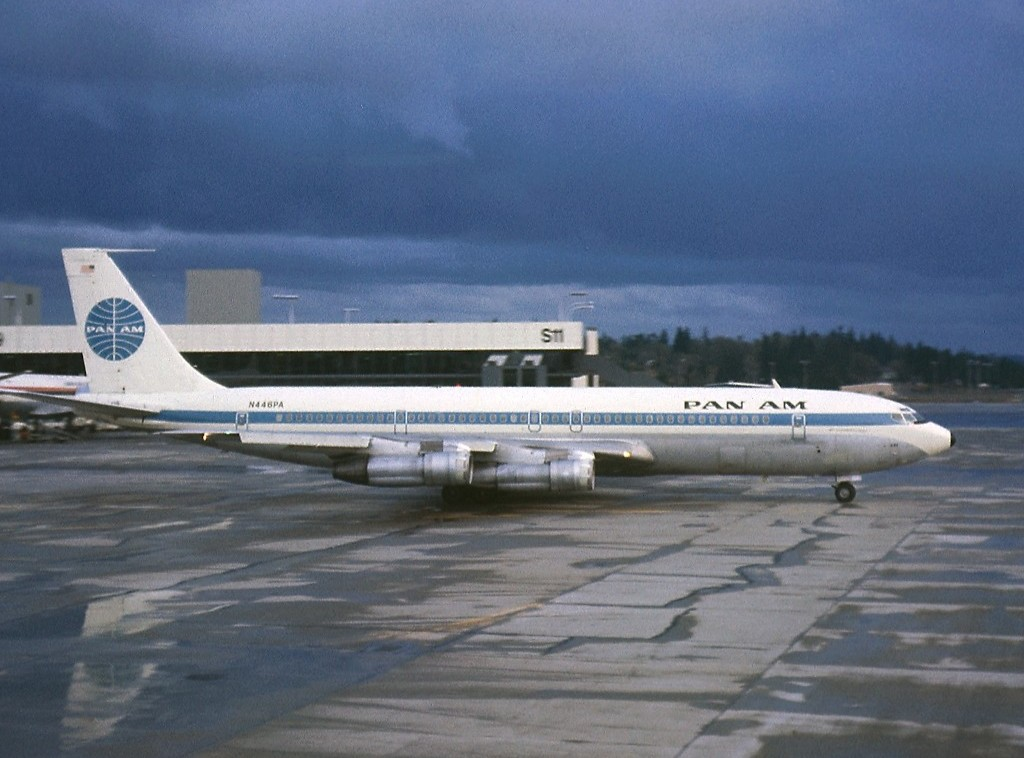
- N446PA, the aircraft involved in the accident

Accident
- Date: April 22, 1974
- Summary: Controlled flight into terrain, instrument failure, pilot error
- Site: Mesehe Mountain, Buleleng, 42.5 nmi (48.9 mi; 78.7 km) northwest of Ngurah Rai International Airport, Denpasar, Bali, Indonesia; 8.391°S 114.929°E

Aircraft
- Aircraft type: Boeing 707-321B
- Aircraft name: Clipper Climax
- Operator: Pan American World Airways
- IATA flight No.: PA812
- ICAO flight No.: PAA812
- Call sign: CLIPPER 812
- Registration: N446PA
- Flight origin: Kai Tak International Airport, British Hong Kong
- 1st stopover: Ngurah Rai International Airport, Denpasar, Indonesia
- 2nd stopover: Sydney (Kingsford-Smith) Airport, Australia
- 3rd stopover: Nadi International Airport, Fiji
- Last stopover: Honolulu International Airport, United States
- Destination: Los Angeles International Airport, United States
- Occupants: 107
- Passengers: 96
- Crew: 11
- Fatalities: 107
- Survivors: 0

Pan Am Flight 812, operated by a Pan Am Boeing 707 registered N446PA and named Clipper Climax, was a scheduled international flight from Hong Kong to Los Angeles, California, with intermediate stops at Denpasar, Sydney, Nadi, and Honolulu. On April 22, 1974, the aircraft crashed into rough mountainous terrain while preparing for a runway 09 approach to Denpasar after a 4-hour 20-minute flight from Hong Kong. All 107 people on board perished. The location of the accident was about 42.5 nautical miles (48.9 mi; 78.7 km) northwest of Ngurah Rai International Airport. Until the 1991 Jakarta Indonesian Air Force C-130 crash, it was the deadliest aviation accident to happen on Indonesian soil.

== Accident ==
Flight 812, a regularly scheduled flight from Hong Kong to Los Angeles via Bali, Sydney, Nadi, and Honolulu, departed Hong Kong on April 22, 1974, at 11:08 UTC (7:08 pm Hong Kong time). The estimated flying time to Bali was 4 hours and 23 minutes. At 15:23 UTC (12:23 am Bali time in 1974), Flight 812 was on final approach to Bali. The aircraft reported reaching 2,500 feet (760 m). The Bali Tower gave instructions to continue the approach and to report when the runway was in sight. Acknowledgement was made by Flight 812 by saying, "Check inbound". At 15:26 the pilot-in-command requested the visibility by calling, "Hey – Tower, what is your visibility out there now?"

However, according to the transcription of Air Traffic Control voice recorder this message was never received by the Bali Tower. Apparently this was the last message transmitted by the aircraft. The Bali Tower kept trying to contact the aircraft by calling, "Clipper eight one two, Bali Tower", and "Clipper eight one two, Bali Tower, how do you read", several times. However, no answer was received from the aircraft. It was subsequently found that the aircraft had hit a mountain approximately 37 miles (60 km) northwest of the Bali airport.

== Search and rescue ==
Once Bali control tower lost contact with the plane and declared that the plane was missing, Indonesian paratroops and authorities were immediately deployed to the area. The last contact established by Flight 812 was at Mesehe Mountain, a dormant volcano located near the airport.

The wreckage was found a day later by two local villagers. They reported that there were no survivors.

Evacuation of the bodies was hampered due to the terrain of the crash site. Indonesian Army officers stated that the rescue operation would take four or five days. On April 25, around 300 rescuers were deployed onto the crash site. The Army later stated that they had recovered around 43 bodies.

== Aircraft ==
The aircraft involved was a Boeing 707-321B, registered as N446PA, which was manufactured by Boeing Commercial Airplanes in 1965. It had logged about 28000 total airframe hours and 9150 takeoff and landing cycles and was equipped with four Pratt & Whitney JT3D-3B engines.

The aircraft was briefly featured in Willy Wonka and the Chocolate Factory, shown offloading Wonka Bars under armed guard.

== Passengers and crews ==
There were 96 passengers from 9 countries on board. 70 passengers were bound for Bali. 24 were bound for Sydney. 2 were bound for Nadi. Pan Am reported that about seventy passengers were tourists bound for a holiday in Bali.

Nationalities on board Flight 812
Nationality	Passengers	Crew	Total
United States	17	9	26
Sweden	0	1	1
Denmark	0	1	1
Japan	29	0	29
Indonesia	18	0	18
Australia	16	0	16
West Germany	4	0	4
Canada	3	0	3
India	6	0	6
Philippines	2	0	2
Taiwan (Republic of China)	1	0	1
Total	96	11	107

Several memorial plaques are to be found for this crash in Jl. Padang Galak, next to the beach Temple, Kesiman, Denpasar East, Indonesia.

The pilot in command was 52-year old Captain Donald Zinke. He had flown a total of 18,247 hours including 7,192 hours in Boeing 707/720 aircraft. He held a DC-4 aircraft rating and a Boeing 707 aircraft rating. The co-pilot was 40-year-old First Officer John Schroeder. He held a valid Boeing 707 rating and had a total flying hours of 6,312 hours including 4,776 hours in Boeing 707/720 aircraft. The other pilot was 38-year old Third Officer Melvin Pratt, held a valid Commercial pilot's licence and a current instrument rating. At the time of the accident, he had flown a total of 4,255 hours including 3,964 hours in Boeing 707/720 aircraft. The other cockpit crew members were 48-year-old Flight Engineer Timothy Crowley and 43-year old Flight Engineer Edward Keating.

== Investigation ==
Multiple eyewitnesses stated that the plane was on fire before it struck the Mesehe Mountain. Others stated that Captain Zinke was trying to land from the northwest, where the mountains were located, rather than the usual route (from the east). The east side didn't have any steep terrain. They also stated that the plane exploded shortly after it struck the mountain. There were also reports that the plane was circling during the accident. Pan American Airways initially declined to comment on the cause of the crash, saying that they would wait for the result of the investigation.

As the aircraft was registered in the United States, the NTSB was called in to investigate the crash. The FBI also assisted in the identification of the victims.

The FBI set up a crisis camp in a hangar in Denpasar. At the time, only 10 percent of Americans were fingerprinted. The identifications were hampered by the Indonesian Government's decision to stop the identification of the victims and the investigation of the crash.

The flight data recorder was recovered on 16 July and the cockpit voice recorder was found on 18 July 1974. The CVR was recovered in good condition, while the FDR had some damage on its outer case due to the crash.

Examination on the wreckage of Flight 812 concluded that the plane didn't break up in flight, as the debris of the plane were concentrated in a specific area, rather than dispersed. The NTSB didn't find engine malfunctions, and added that they didn't find evidence that may indicate that the plane was not airworthy.

=== Sequence of events based on the final report ===
The following sequence of events were based on the final report: The crew were trying to contact Bali Air Traffic Control, but they encountered several difficulties in doing so. First contact between the aircraft and Bali Tower was established at 15:06 UTC, whereupon Bali Tower instructed Flight 812 to contact Bali Control on frequency 128.3 MHz, because the aircraft was still within the jurisdiction area of Bali Control. That was acknowledged by Flight 812 accordingly. Subsequently, communication between the aircraft and the ground was normal.

Captain Zinke didn't encounter any difficulties on the approach procedure to Denpasar's Ngurah Rai Airport. The procedure stated that before it could land at the airport, the flight should maintain 12,000 feet (3,700 m) and should then execute the full ADF let-down procedure. The pilots were aware that there was mountainous terrain on the north of the airport and that flight level 120 would clear the mountains. The crew then informed the controllers of the ETA of Flight 812, and stated their intention to make a right turn within 25 miles (40 km) from the beacon for a track out on 261 degrees, descending to 1,500 feet (460 m) followed by a procedure to turn over the water for final approach on Runway 09.

An Automatic direction finder (ADF). The ADF pointer points to the direction of an NDB (non-directional beacon)

At 15:18 UTC, the crew noticed that the number one ADF was "swinging" while ADF number two remained steady. A few seconds later, the crew of Flight 812 reported to Bali Control that the plane was over the station turning outbound descending to flight level 120. That was acknowledged by Bali Control and Flight 812 was then instructed to change over to Bali Tower. After establishing contact with Bali Tower, Flight 812 reported that they were making outbound procedure at flight level 110 (approximately 11,000 feet (3,400 m)) and requested for lower altitude. The plane was later cleared for lower altitude.

The crew of Flight 812 then decided to execute an early right turn on 263 degrees. The early execution of the right turn was caused by the malfunctioning ADF number one. The input was made since the crew assumed that they were nearing the NDB (Non-directional beacon). Investigators stated that the right hand turn was made at a position approximately 30 NM North of the beacon.

Several attempts were made to regain proper indication on the ADFs after the turn, but that couldn't be done because the plane was "shielded" by the mountain. The crew continued their approach and the plane subsequently crashed into the terrain.

=== Conclusion ===
It was determined that the premature execution of a right-hand turn to join the 263-degree outbound track, which was based on the indication given by only one of the radio direction finders while the other one was still in steady condition, is the most probable cause of the accident.

== Aftermath ==
Flight 812 was the third 707 the airline had lost in the Pacific in less than a year, after Pan Am Flight 806 in Pago Pago on January 30, 1974 and Pan Am Flight 816 in Papeete on July 22, 1973. Following the crash, Pan Am addressed the issue and encouraged an early form of Crew Resource Management. Flight 812 was the final 707 lost following the safety improvements.

Due to the crash of Flight 812, the Federal Aviation Administration ordered an in-depth inspection of the airline's worldwide flight operations including pilot training, area qualification, operational procedures, pilot supervision and scheduling, line-check procedures, and other related matters of safety. The FAA did not criticize Pan American Airways or imply unsafe operations.

On May 8, 1974, Pan American Airways ordered the installation of a new cockpit warning device designed to prevent crashes such as the April 22 incident on all 140 planes in its fleet. The ground proximity warning system provided additional indications, for example if a plane was heading for a mountain slope or if it was too low for a landing. This was an automatic supplement to more conventional altitude warning systems, already installed on most Pan Am aircraft.

In the aftermath of the crash, Pan Am stopped its Hong Kong to Sydney flights via Bali. A monument was erected by the Regent of Badung Regency Wayan Dana and Bali Governor Soekarmen, with the names of 107 victims inscribed on it.

== See also ==
- Invicta International Airlines Flight 435
- Alitalia Flight 404
- Trigana Air Flight 267
- Santa Barbara Airlines Flight 518
- Intercontinental de Aviación Flight 256
- Turkish Airlines Flight 6491
- Korean Air Flight 801
