= 2009 Indonesian Air Force L-100 crash =

Aviation accident in Indonesia

- The aftermath of the accident

Accident
- Date: 20 May 2009
- Summary: Controlled flight into terrain during approach
- Site: Iswahyudi Air Force Base, Magetan, East Java, Indonesia; 7°39′S 111°22′E
- Total fatalities: 99
- Total survivors: 15

Aircraft
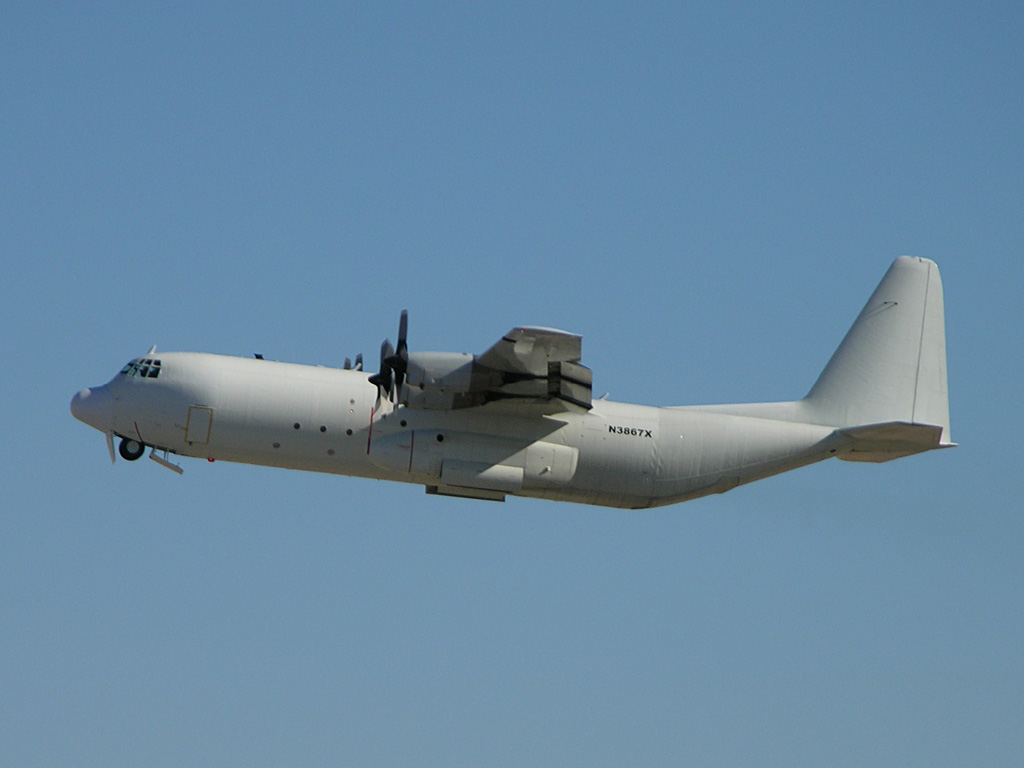
- A Lockheed L-100 similar to the aircraft involved
- Aircraft type: Lockheed L-100-30(P) Hercules
- Operator: Indonesian Air Force
- Registration: A-1325
- Flight origin: Halim Perdana Kusuma Airport, Jakarta, Indonesia
- Destination: Iswahyudi Air Force Base, Magetan Regency, Indonesia
- Occupants: 112
- Passengers: 98
- Crew: 14
- Fatalities: 97
- Injuries: 15
- Survivors: 15

Ground casualties
- Ground fatalities: 2

On 20 May 2009, an Indonesian Air Force Lockheed L-100-30(P) Hercules carrying 112 people (98 passengers and 14 crew) crashed at about 6:30 local time (23:30 UTC), while flying from Jakarta to eastern Java. The crash resulted in 99 deaths, 2 of which occurred on impact when the aircraft struck at least four houses before skidding into a rice paddy in the village of Geplak. and at least 70 others were taken to a local hospital. This is considered among the worst air disasters in Indonesian history and was the first Air Force crash since the 1991 Jakarta Indonesian Air Force C-130 crash, which also involved a Hercules.

The airplane, a civilian Lockheed L-100-30(P) version of the Lockheed C-130 Hercules, registration A-1325 had been on a normal flight transporting military personnel and their families to Iswahyudi Air Force Base. The plane prepared to land on base but instead crashed about 5.5 kilometres (3.4 mi) northwest of the north end of the runway, bursting into flames upon impact. Flying conditions were good and the weather was clear at the time of the crash. Air control communicated with the crew minutes before the accident and indicated no issues. 11 of the 15 survivors were treated at Dr. Soedono Hospital and 4 at the base's hospital. All deceased were identified by the evening of May 22.

The Indonesian Air Force said it was unlikely that the cause of the plane crash would be shared publicly, a practice said to be a military standard around the world. The plane had passed inspection the day before the crash. Witnesses variously claimed seeing fire inside the plane; hearing two explosions; nuts and bolts falling to the ground up to 2km away from the crash site; and a wing snapping off the aircraft. A survivor said that "it felt like the plane's engines just stopped and then the aircraft began to break apart in mid-air." Others speculate that the Hercules series is poorly designed but the Air Force is too underfunded to afford safer planes or spare parts for aircraft they do have.
