= 2016 Indonesian Air Force C-130 crash =

Plane Crash in Indonesia

Indonesian Air Force Lockheed C-130 Hercules crash
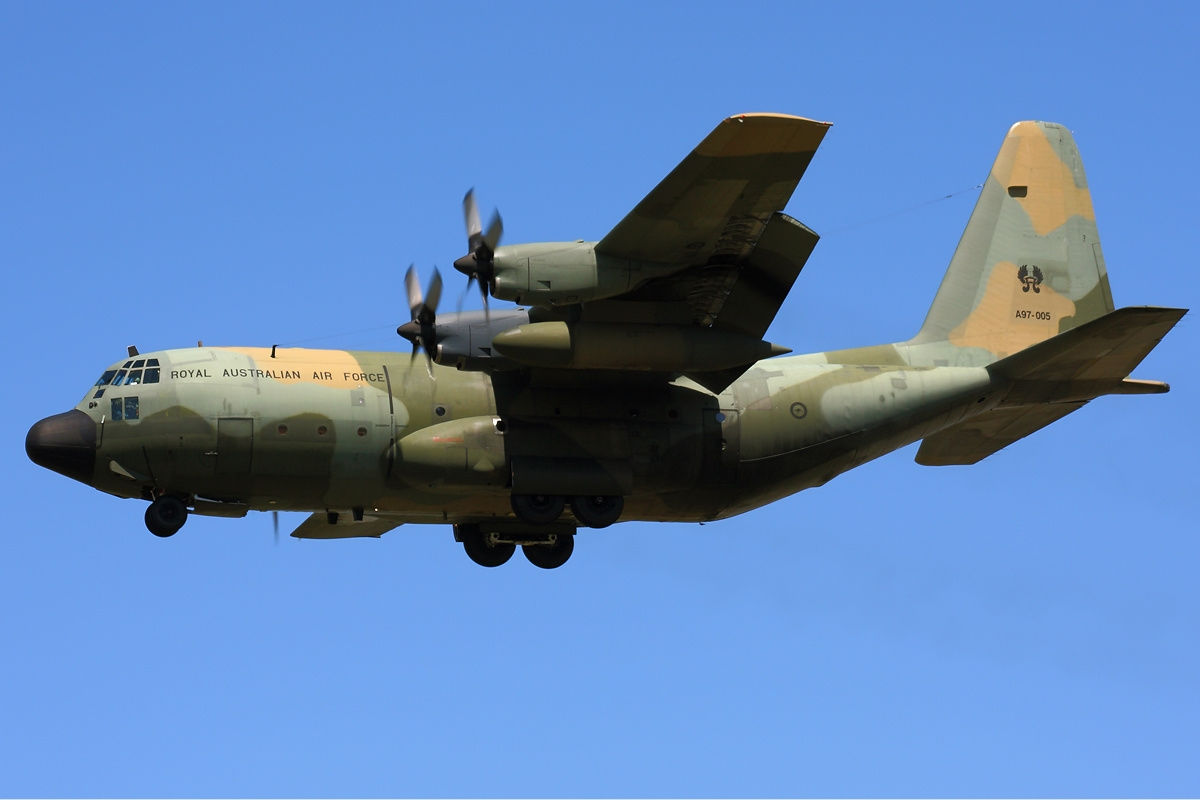
- The aircraft involved in the incident, photographed when it was still in service with the Royal Australian Air Force as A97-005.

Accident
- Date: 18 December 2016
- Summary: Controlled flight into terrain
- Site: Mount Lisuwa, Maima District, Jayawijaya Regency, Papua, Indonesia; 4°6′53″S 138°58′8″E

Aircraft
- Aircraft type: Lockheed C-130H Hercules
- Operator: Indonesian Air Force
- Registration: A-1334
- Flight origin: Mozes Kilangin Airport, Timika, Indonesia
- Destination: Wamena Airport, Wamena, Indonesia
- Occupants: 13
- Passengers: 1
- Crew: 12
- Fatalities: 13
- Injuries: 0
- Survivors: 0

On 18 December 2016, an Indonesian Air Force Lockheed C-130H Hercules crashed on Mount Lisuwa while approaching Wamena Airport in Wamena, Papua, Indonesia. The aircraft, which was flying a co-pilot training mission, was carrying twelve crew members of the Indonesian Air Force and one passenger. The aircraft was destroyed on impact; all thirteen occupants died.

== Aircraft ==
According to Hadiyan Sumintaatmadja, Vice Chief of the Indonesian Air Force Staff, the aircraft involved was airworthy and had accumulated 9,000 flight hours during its lifespan. He added that the aircraft had received routine maintenance checks, scheduled to be performed every 50 hours. The aircraft itself was newly delivered to the fleet. Delivered in March 2016 from Australia, it was the first of five ex-RAAF C-130H Hercules purchased from the Royal Australian Air Force. The Indonesian Air Force was planning to add up to 16 Hercules to its fleet.

== Accident ==
The aircraft, a Lockheed C-130 Hercules carrying 12 crew members, a passenger, and 12 tonnes of logistics, took off at 05:35 local time (UTC +9) from Mimika Regency's capital Timika, bound for Wamena Airport in Wamena. The aircraft was piloted by Major Marlon A Kawer, and according to a military statement in Halim, the flight was also acting as a training mission for the co-pilot. It was scheduled to land in Wamena at 06:13 local time, before continuing to Jayapura.

The aircraft had contacted Wamena Tower at 06:02, prior to a planned landing on Runway 15. However, due to poor visibility, Wamena Tower suggested that the aircraft should move to another runway, and the pilot accordingly changed to Runway 33. Wamena Tower obtained visual contact with the aircraft at 06:08, but a minute later lost all contact with the plane.

Following the crash, a crisis center was set up at Sentani Airport and 30 military personnel were deployed to the area. Search and rescue teams immediately found the wreckage on Mount Lisuwa, near Runway 33. Officials stated that the wreckage was burnt, with the tail section detached from the main body of the aircraft. No survivors were found at the crash site, and bodies were discovered in mutilated and disfigured condition. Military officials stated that the bodies of all thirteen of the victims had been found at the crash site and were transported to the nearest airport. By noon on 18 December, ten bodies had been identified. The bodies were repatriated to Malang, East Java. A ceremony was held during the repatriation.

== Investigation ==
The Indonesian Air Force sent a team of investigators to the site of the crash and stated that it planned to analyse several factors possibly contributing to the crash. Eyewitness reports stated that the area surrounding the crash was covered with thick fog, and it was possible that the crew had lost their orientation due to the poor visibility.

== Aftermath ==
A massive public outcry occurred after the crash, with most people criticizing the ageing fleets on the Indonesian Air Force. Several people asked to stop the operation of every Lockheed C-130 Hercules aircraft in Indonesia due to its old age and recent crashes that involved the aircraft. However, the commander of the Indonesian Armed Forces Gatot Nurmantyo stated that it will continue to operate the aircraft. He added that due to the large number of islands in Indonesia, only the Lockheed C-130 Hercules could reach all the islands in Indonesia.

Government officials were asked to review the aging fleets in the Indonesian Air Force. The Head of the People's Consultative Assembly Zulkifli Hasan stated that the Indonesian Government needs to review and renew its fleet. Indonesian President Joko Widodo had also asked the same thing and ordered to observe the maintenance of every aircraft of the Indonesian Armed Forces.

After the crash, the Indonesian Air Force would renew the engines of every Hercules on their fleet. Members of the Indonesian People's Representatives will call the Indonesian Defense Minister Ryamizard Ryacudu for his responsibility on the crash.

== See also ==
- 2015 Indonesian Air Force Lockheed C-130 Hercules crash
