= 1979 Garuda Indonesian Airways Fokker F28 crash =

Aviation accident in Indonesia

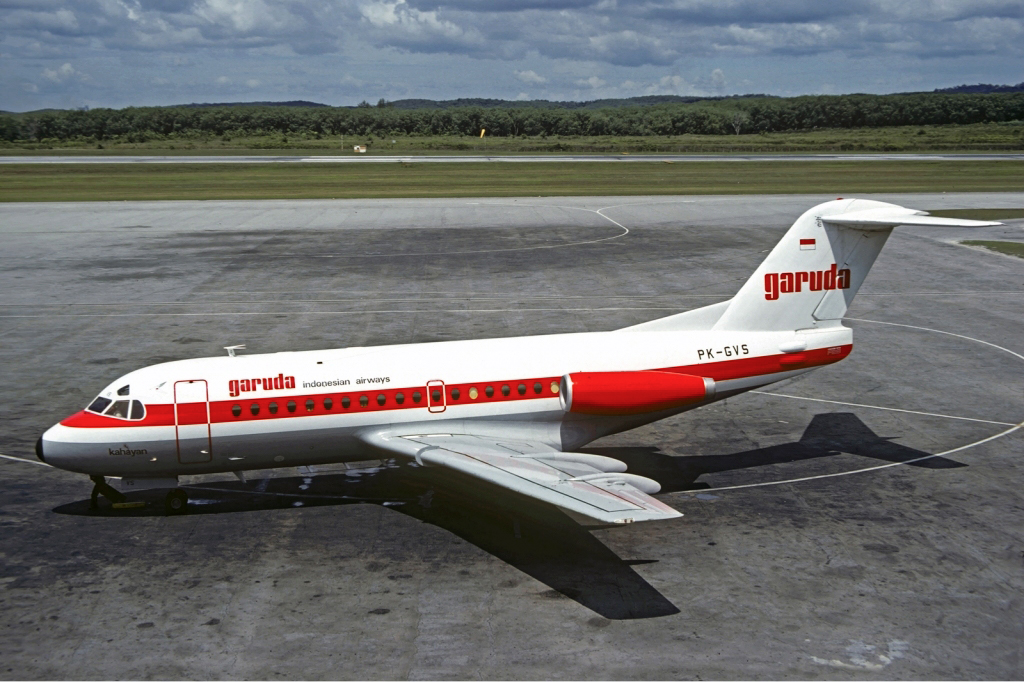
- A Garuda Indonesia Fokker F28, similar to the one involved.

Accident
- Date: 11 July 1979
- Summary: Controlled flight into terrain
- Site: Mount Sibayak, Indonesia; 3.25°N 98.5°E

Aircraft
- Aircraft type: Fokker F28 Mk-1000
- Aircraft name: Mamberamo
- Operator: Garuda Indonesian Airways
- Registration: PK-GVE
- Flight origin: Talang Betutu Airport. Palembang, Indonesia
- Destination: Polonia International Airport, Medan, Indonesia
- Occupants: 61
- Passengers: 57
- Crew: 4
- Fatalities: 61
- Survivors: 0

On 11 July 1979, a Garuda Indonesian Airways Fokker F28 airliner on a domestic flight in Indonesia from Talang Betutu Airport, Palembang, to Polonia International Airport (now Soewondo Air Force Base), Medan, struck Mount Sibayak at 5,560 feet (1,690 m) on approach to landing, with no survivors.

== Background ==
=== Aircraft ===
The aircraft involved, manufactured on 25 August 1972, was a 7-year-old Fokker F28-1000 registered as PK-GVE with serial number 11055. It was previously registered as PK-GJV before being re-registered as PK-GVE in July 1974. It had a total of 14,154 flight hours in 14,084 flight cycles. The aircraft was named Mamberamo after the Mamberamo River in Western New Guinea. It was purchased by Garuda Indonesia Airways in 1972 for less than US$5,000,000. By March in 1979, the airline owned 30 Fokker F28s before losing one that crashed into Mount Bromo.

=== Crew ===
There were four crew members on board the flight. The captain of the flight was AE Lontoh with around 7,000 hours of flying experience who had first joined Garuda Indonesian Airways in May 1969. The first officer was 26-year-old Moh Nurtjahjo. The flight attendants included 21-year-old Netty Meriyati Pittal Uli br Simatupang who had completed her flight attendant education in December 1978 before starting to work in early 1979 and 20-year-old Raflesiawati Anwar Zen who started working at the airline in April 1979.

== Accident ==
The aircraft, operating with an unknown flight number, had departed Palembang 80 minutes earlier and had been cleared for an approach to runway 05 at Medan Airport. The aircraft was asked to report passing the nondirectional beacon (NDB) "ON" at 2,500 feet (760 m). The pilot then reported he was maintaining a height of 9,300 feet (2,800 m) as the NDB was unreliable. The approach controller then asked them to maintain that height until after they had passed the NDB. The pilot then reported they were at 6,000 feet (1,800 m). The aircraft struck the 7,200-foot-high (2,200 m) volcano Mount Sibayak at 5,560 feet (1,690 m).

== Aftermath ==
The crash was officially announced the following day. According to Reuters, local villagers reached the crash site at 2 a.m. and a search party was subsequently sent from Medan. According to Agence France-Presse, a search and rescue (SAR) aircraft spotted the wreckage of the plane. No survivors were found. An SAR team headed to the crash site to investigate the cause of the crash. Additionally, Minister of Transportation Roesmin Noerjadin flew to Medan to investigate the accident.

A reporter for Analisa reported that villagers who witnessed the accident reported hearing a boom before seeing a fire at the crash site. He also reported that villagers who participated in the search and rescue at the crash site only found "broken pieces of metal and huge chunks of wreckage". The wings and the tail of the aircraft were the only pieces of wreckage that were still recognizable.

The airline provided the families of the victims with Rp 3.4 million in compensation in addition to compensating the passengers' baggages with Rp 2,000 per kilogram.

Forty-eight unidentified bodies from the crash of Garuda Indonesia Flight 152 were buried in a cemetery outside of Polonia International Airport where 57 occupants of this crash were already buried.

== Investigation ==
By afternoon the following day, Roesmin Noerjadin said that although a member of the search and rescue team had said that they had found the aircraft's cockpit voice recorder and flight data recorder, it hadn't been confirmed by their experts. On 14 July, he stated that bad weather and low clouds were probably the cause of the crash.

== See also ==
- 1982 Garuda Fokker F28 crash, involving the same type of plane and airline
