= 2015 Sumatra Indonesian Air Force C-130 crash =

Fatal aircraft crash in Medan, Indonesia

2015 Indonesian Air Force KC-130 Hercules crash
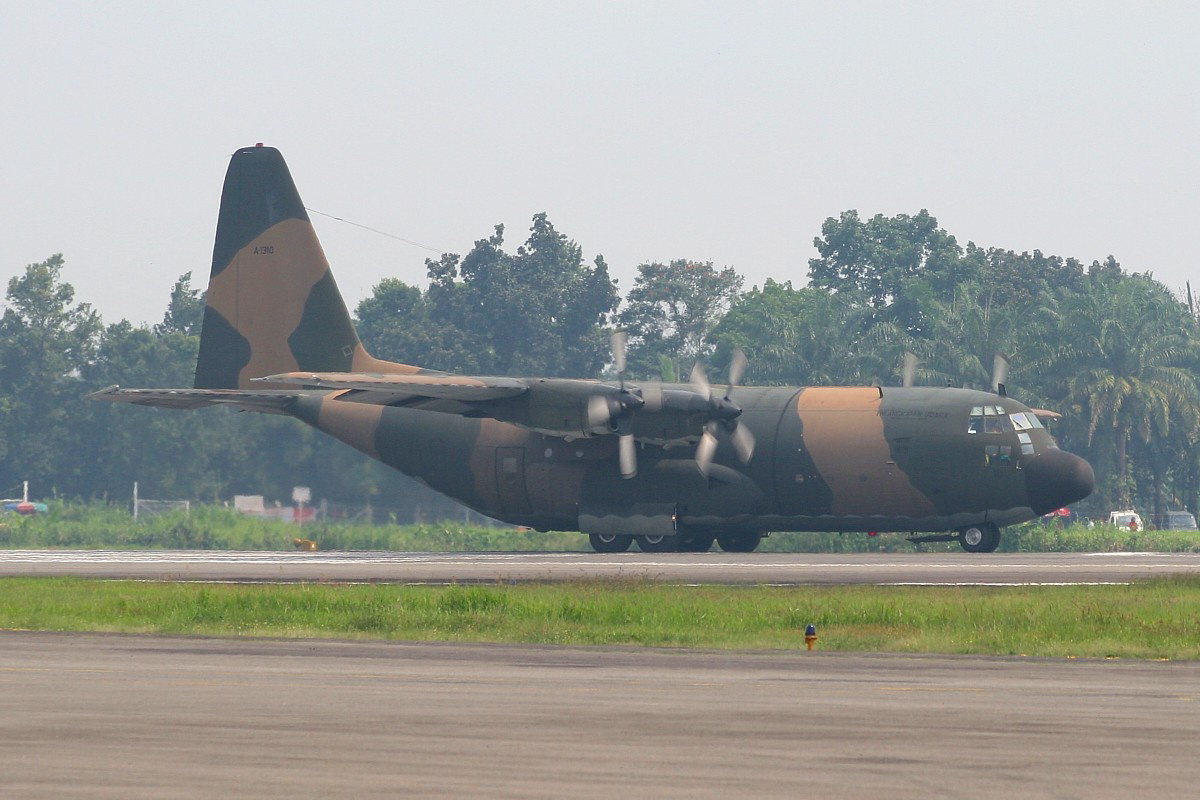
- A-1310, the aircraft involved in the crash, photographed in 2005

Accident
- Date: 30 June 2015
- Summary: Engine failure on take-off
- Site: Medan, North Sumatra, Indonesia; 3°31′31″N 98°37′50″E
- Total fatalities: 139
- Total injuries: 3

Aircraft
- Aircraft type: Lockheed KC-130B Hercules
- Operator: Indonesian Air Force
- Registration: A-1310
- Flight origin: Malang, Jakarta, Indonesia
- Stopover: Soewondo Air Force Base, Medan, Indonesia
- Destination: Raja Haji Fisabilillah Airport, Tanjung Pinang, Indonesia
- Occupants: 122
- Passengers: 110
- Crew: 12
- Fatalities: 122
- Survivors: 0

Ground casualties
- Ground fatalities: 17
- Ground injuries: 3

On 30 June 2015, a Lockheed KC-130B Hercules (registration number A-1310) operated by the Indonesian Air Force with 12 crew and 110 passengers on board, crashed near a residential neighbourhood shortly after taking off from Medan, Indonesia, going to Tanjung Pinang. All 122 people on board were killed, along with 17 people on the ground.

At the time of the crash, the aircraft was transporting military personnel and their families, and possibly some civilian passengers.

Shortly after the crash, the Chief of Staff of the Indonesian Air Force grounded their entire C-130 fleet for inspection at Abdul Rachman Saleh Airport, from which the aircraft involved originated.

== Accident ==
The aircraft took off at 12:08 pm (05:08 UTC) from Soewondo Air Force Base, after refuelling and taking on passengers. It crashed near Djamin Ginting Road in Medan about two minutes later. The crash site was approximately 5 km (3 mi) from the base. According to the Chief of Staff of the Indonesian Air Force, air chief marshal Agus Supriana, before crashing, the pilot had requested permission to return to base.

According to eyewitnesses and Indonesian media, after the pilot indicated the aircraft would return to base, it drastically rolled to the right. An eyewitness reported that after the aircraft rolled, it then clipped a radio tower belonging to Joy FM, dived toward the ground, and then exploded. After it dived, multiple explosions were heard from as far as 1 kilometre (0.62 miles) away. The aircraft became inverted, and the nose clipped the Golden Eleven Hotel. It then struck three other buildings, one of which was a crowded massage parlour, at a nearly perpendicular angle. It finally exploded in what onlookers described as "a hell-like scene", with bodies ejected onto the street.

It was the deadliest C-130 Hercules crash in Indonesian history, surpassing the 1991 Hercules crash in East Jakarta, the third-deadliest air disaster in the province of North Sumatra, after Garuda Indonesia Flight 152 and Mandala Airlines Flight 091, and the second air disaster in Indonesia within six months, after Indonesia AirAsia Flight 8501 in December 2014. The crash site was located only 2 kilometres (1.2 miles) away from the previous crash site of Mandala Airlines Flight 091, which also crashed minutes after takeoff.

== Passengers and crew ==
The aircraft was transporting military personnel and their families for duty rotations. The passengers included those who boarded the aircraft from Malang, Jakarta, and Pekanbaru; the aircraft was scheduled to continue to Tanjung Pinang, Natuna, and Pontianak, before returning to Malang. Such flights are common in Indonesia, and it is common for families to be transported together in military aircraft.

There were 110 passengers and 12 crew members on board. At least 7 people on the ground were reported missing and feared dead.

Agus Harimurti Yudhoyono, then a young army officer and acquaintance of the pilot, claimed that the captain of the aircraft, Sandy Permana, was very experienced and "one of the best pilots in the Indonesian Air Force".

Identification of the victims started on 1 July 2015. The Indonesian National Search and Rescue Agency (BASARNAS) stated that around 100 bodies were found in the crash site, along with 60 body parts. The bodies were transported to Adam Malik Hospital in Medan for identification. By 4 July, at least 119 bodies had been identified and returned to their families.

== Crash site ==
Crash site shown on a map of Sumatra

The crash occurred in a crowded residential neighbourhood in Medan, Indonesia's third-largest city. The aircraft took off from Soewondo Air Force Base, formerly Polonia airport. Polonia had been the city's main commercial airport until it was replaced by Kualanamu International Airport in 2013, partly due to concerns arising from its proximity to urban areas (2 kilometres (1.2 miles) from the city centre). Soewondo now serves as the headquarters of the Air Force's Western Surveillance Wing.

Moments after the crash, onlookers began searching through the wreckage for survivors. Thousands of local residents attempted to approach the site. Crowds attempted to bring hoses to the site, while soldiers also aided in the search. At least four people survived the initial impact and were later admitted to the nearest hospital for serious burn injuries. These were later confirmed as "survivors on the ground", not passengers or crew. All 122 people on board the aircraft died in the accident.

== Investigation ==
Because the aircraft was not fitted with a flight recorder, the Indonesian National Transportation Safety Committee primarily relied on the wreckage pattern, and the pilot's flight history, for the investigation. On 1 July 2015, all of the ammunition and two engines from the aircraft were removed from the crash site.

The Indonesian National Armed Forces (TNI) said that they would pay the insurance claims, which totalled Rp 2.25 trillion (roughly US$170 million). The investigation was expected to be completed in two weeks. The preliminary report was not made public.

The aircraft was one of ten C-130Bs given to Indonesia by the United States in exchange for an imprisoned CIA pilot, captured during the 1957–1961 Sulawesi rebellion. The aircraft suffered from a shortage of spare parts after the US enacted an embargo (9 September 1999 – 22 November 2005) on Indonesia over their part in the 1999 East Timorese crisis. In view of the aircraft's age, the crash sparked public outcry over the state of the Indonesian Air Force Hercules fleet. However, Indonesian officials denied that the aircraft's age was a factor in the crash, and insisted it was in "good condition".

On 3 July 2015, it was reported that the number four engine propeller had malfunctioned before the aircraft hit the tower, indicating a mechanical failure. All four of the aircraft's engines were recovered from the crash site as part of the investigation.

Roughly 90% of witnesses reported that the aircraft struck a mobile phone tower before it crashed. The tower was found to be illegal, according to an Indonesian official. As a result, the Indonesian People's Representative Council advised that "illegal towers" anywhere in Indonesia had to be removed, as they were "ugly" to the scenery and "dangerous" for safety. President Joko Widodo and Vice President Jusuf Kalla agreed to the need to retire old aircraft in the Indonesian Air Force's fleet, to prevent a similar tragedy.

== See also ==
- List of accidents and incidents involving the Lockheed C-130 Hercules
- List of aircraft accidents and incidents resulting in at least 50 fatalities
