= Garuda Indonesia Flight 035 =

1987 aviation accident

- A Garuda Indonesia Douglas DC-9, similar to the one involved in the accident

Accident
- Date: 4 April 1987
- Summary: Crashed on approach in bad weather
- Site: Polonia Airport, Indonesia

Aircraft
- Aircraft type: Mcdonnell Douglas DC-9-32
- Aircraft name: Pawan
- Operator: Garuda Indonesia
- IATA flight No.: GA035
- ICAO flight No.: GIA035
- Call sign: INDONESIA 035
- Registration: PK-GNQ
- Flight origin: Sultan Iskandar Muda Airport, Banda Aceh Indonesia
- Destination: Polonia Airport, Medan Indonesia
- Occupants: 45
- Passengers: 37
- Crew: 8
- Fatalities: 23
- Injuries: 22
- Survivors: 22

Garuda Indonesia Flight 035 was a domestic Garuda Indonesia flight that struck a pylon and crashed on approach to Medan-Polonia Airport on 4 April 1987. Out of the 45 passengers and crew on board, 23 were killed in the accident.

== Accident ==
The aircraft was on an Instrument Landing System approach to Medan Airport in a thunderstorm. The aircraft struck electrical power lines and crashed short of the runway. The aircraft broke up and the tail section separated and fire broke out.

Most of the survivors escaped through breaks in the fuselage and 11 were flung free of the aircraft. Four of the eight crew died and 19 passengers suffered fatal injuries due to smoke inhalation and burns. Four crew and 18 passengers suffered serious injuries. All of the fatalities were a result of the fire and not due to the impact with the ground.

== Aircraft ==
The flight was carried out by a 1976-built Douglas DC-9-32 registered PK-GNQ, named "Pawan". The aircraft was damaged beyond repair and written off.
