= KLM Flight 844 =

1957 aviation accident

Coordinates: 1.2033°S 136.1461°E

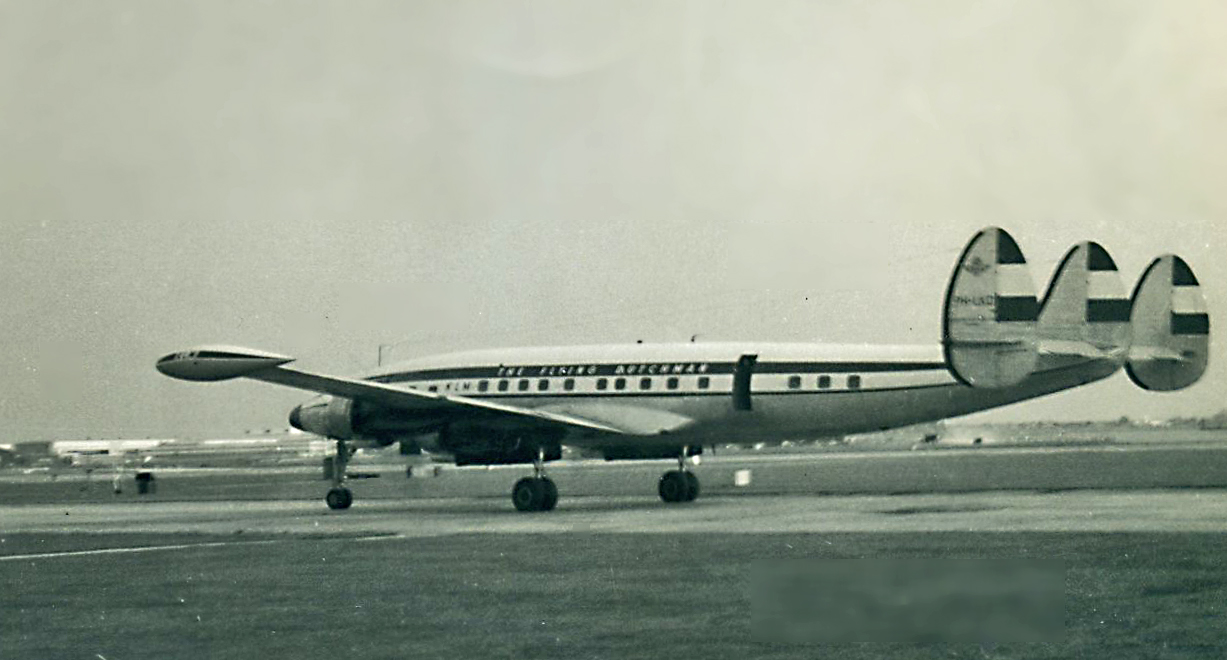
- A KLM L-1049 similar to the one involved in the crash.

Accident
- Date: 16 July 1957
- Summary: Pilot error or possible technical failure (undetermined)
- Site: Cenderawasih Bay, off Biak-Mokmer Airport, Biak Islands, Dutch New Guinea

Aircraft
- Aircraft type: Lockheed 1049E Super Constellation
- Aircraft name: Neutron
- Operator: KLM
- Registration: PH-LKT
- Flight origin: Biak-Mokmer Airport (BIK/WABB)
- Destination: Manila International Airport (MNL/RPLL)
- Occupants: 68
- Passengers: 59
- Crew: 9
- Fatalities: 58
- Survivors: 10

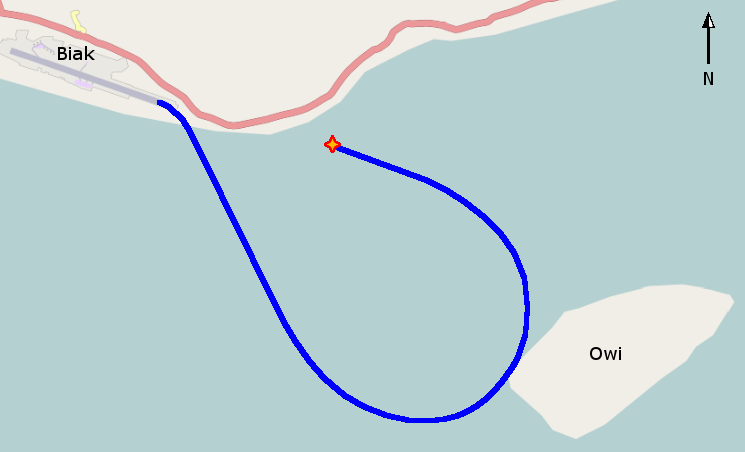
Flight path and crash location of KL 844.

KLM (Royal Dutch Airlines) Flight 844 was an international scheduled passenger flight from Biak-Mokmer Airport, Dutch New Guinea (now Indonesia) to Manila International Airport, Manila, Philippines on 16 July 1957, which crashed into Cenderawasih Bay 1.2 kilometres (0.75 mi; 0.65 nmi) from its departure airport. As a result, 58 (9 of which were crew members) out of 68 onboard perished. The flight was the first leg of a service with the ultimate destination of Amsterdam, Netherlands.

== The aircraft ==
The Lockheed 1049E Super Constellation was registered PH-LKT and christened Neutron. With a construction number of 4504, the aircraft first flew in 1953 and accumulated 11,867 hours of flight. After Flight 844, Neutron was written off.

== Flight ==
After take-off at 03:32 on 16 July 1957 from Runway 10 at Biak-Mokmer Airport, the captain of KLM Flight 844 requested that the runway lights be kept on and permission to carry out a low pass down the runway, with both requests granted. The Super Constellation initiated a 180-degree turn, losing altitude during the turn until it struck the sea at 03:36, breaking apart and sinking in water with depths of 250 metres (820 ft).

== Investigation ==
Probable cause

Initially the crash was attributed to pilot error and/or technical failure, with no direct evidence for either cause. As the accident happened at night, the pilot might have misjudged his altitude relative to the sea.

The summary of the report from the Accident Board noted that there was no evidence of either pilot error or technical failure, but also noted that the risks involved in take-off and landing should not be needlessly increased by carrying out low passes on scheduled services with passengers aboard.
