= 1982 Garuda Fokker F28 crash =

1982 aviation accident in Indonesia

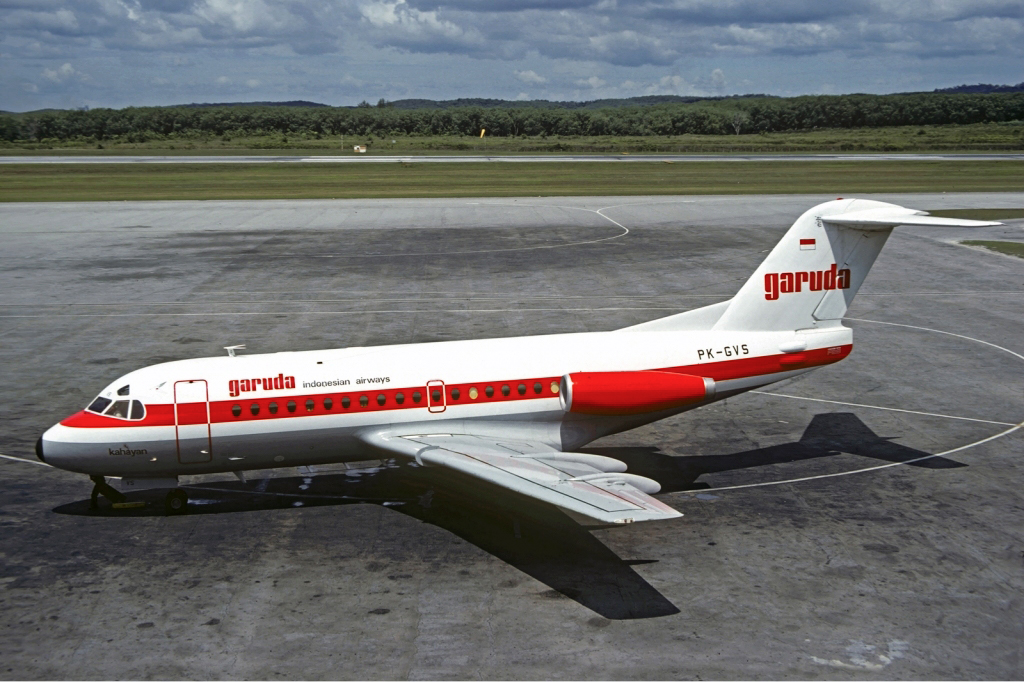
- A similar F28

Accident
- Date: 20 March 1982
- Summary: Runway overrun in bad weather
- Site: Tanjung Karang-Branti Airport; 5.23352°S 105.17104°E

Aircraft
- Aircraft type: Fokker F28 Mk-1000
- Aircraft name: Cinamuk
- Operator: Garuda Indonesian Airways
- Registration: PK-GVK
- Flight origin: Kemayoran Airport, Jakarta, Indonesia
- Destination: Tanjung Karang-Branti Airport, Lampung, Indonesia
- Occupants: 27
- Passengers: 23
- Crew: 4
- Fatalities: 27
- Survivors: 0

The 1982 Garuda Fokker F28 crash, which killed all 27 people on board a Garuda Indonesian Airways Fokker F28 occurred on March 20, 1982. Garuda was operating a passenger flight to on the Jakarta-Lampung route overran the runway at Tanjung Karang-Branti Airport (Lampung) in the province of Lampung, Indonesia, during very heavy rain. The aircraft stopped on 700m (2300ft/770yd) away from the runway in a field with the aircraft setting on fire.

== See also ==
- 1979 Garuda Fokker F28 crash, involving the same type of plane and airline
- Air France Flight 358
- Saudia Flight 163
