= Soewondo Air Force Base =

Military airport of Medan, North Sumatra, Indonesia

- Pangkalan Angkatan Udara Soewondo
- Medan Polonia District, Medan, North Sumatra in Indonesia
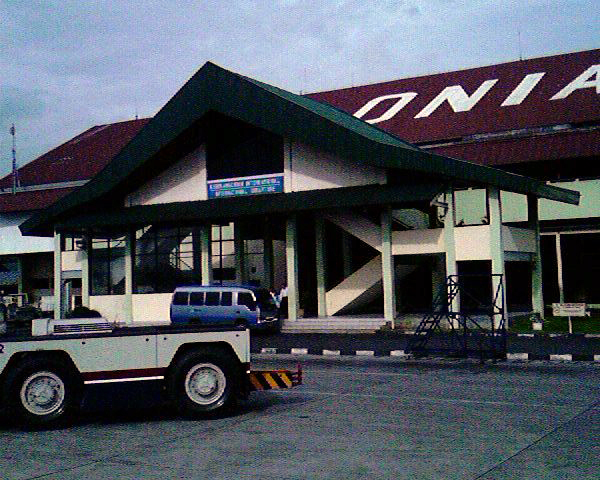

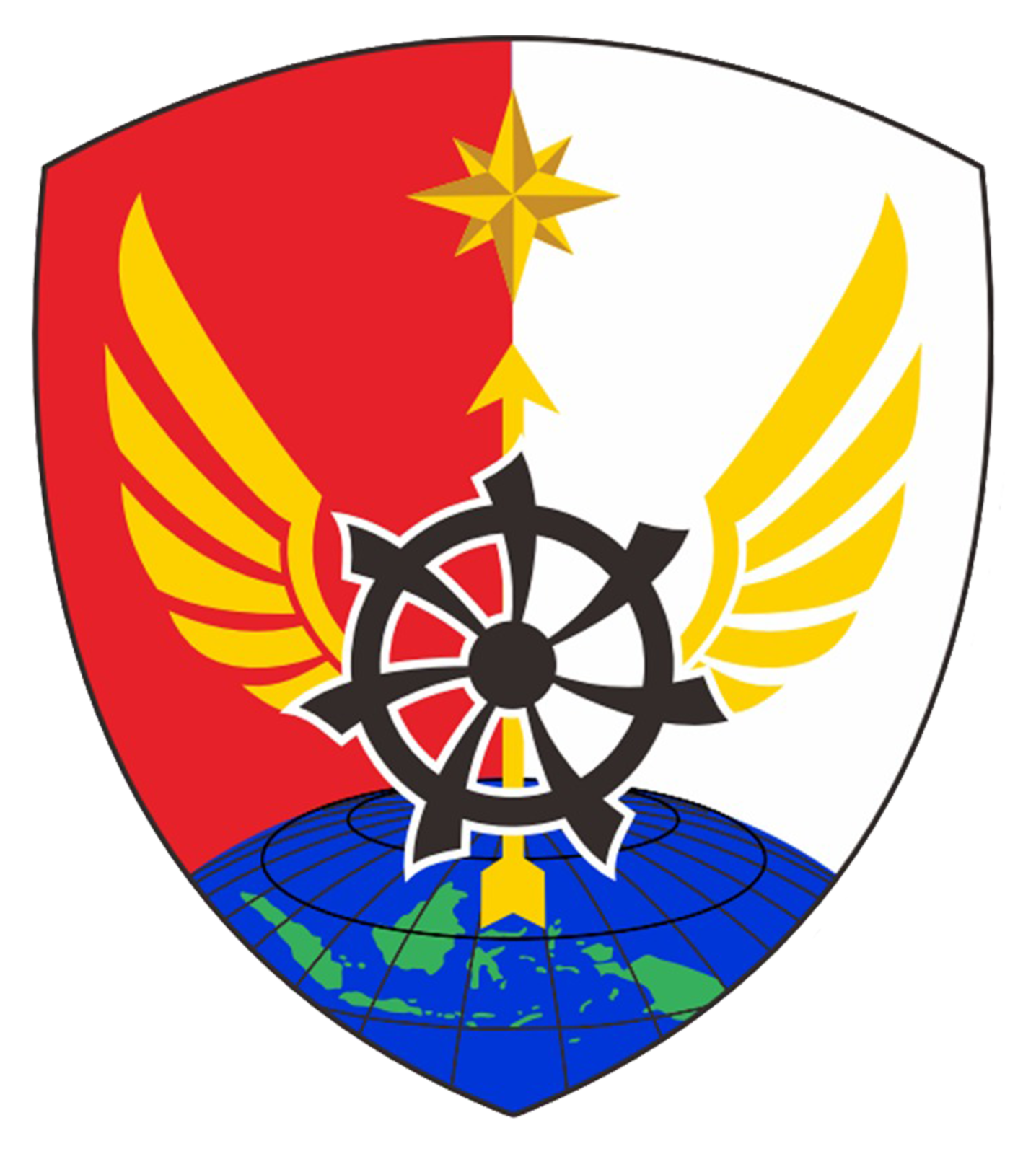

Site information
- Type: Type A Air Force Base
- Owner: Indonesian Air Force
- Controlled by: National Air Operations Command
- Condition: Operational

Location
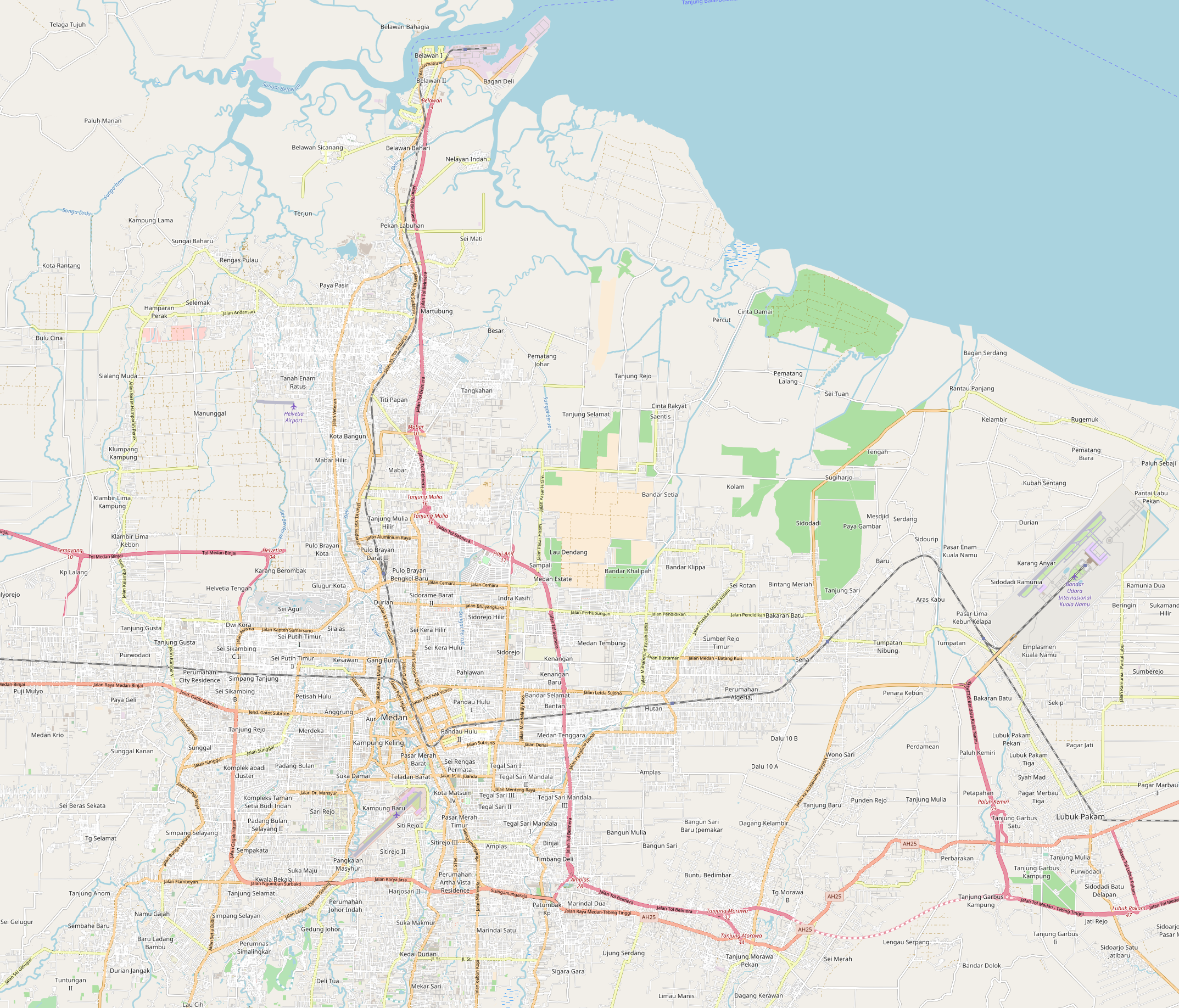
- Location of airport in Medan, Northern Sumatra, MES (Northern Sumatra)
- Coordinates: 03°33′29″N 98°40′18″E

Site history
- Built: 1928
- In use: 1928–present

Airfield information
- Identifiers: ICAO: WIMK, LID: MES
- Elevation: 35 metres (115 ft) AMSL
Runways
Direction	Length and surface
05/23	3,000 metres (9,843 ft) Asphalt

Soewondo Air Force Base (IATA: MES, ICAO: WIMK) is a military airbase in Medan, North Sumatra, Indonesia. Before 2013, this airport served commercial flights, and was known as Polonia International Airport which was the principal airport serving Medan, about 2 km (1.2 mi) from the downtown; it used to serve flights to several Indonesian and Malaysian cities, along with a flight to Singapore and Thailand. Previous international flights had been opened to Hong Kong, Taipei, Amsterdam, Abu Dhabi, Phuket, Chennai, Johor Bahru, Malacca and Ipoh.

At the end of its service as a civil airport, Polonia was the fourth-busiest airport in Indonesia by passenger numbers, after Soekarno–Hatta International Airport in Jakarta, Juanda International Airport in Surabaya, and I Gusti Ngurah Rai International Airport in Denpasar. All commercial flights and passenger services were transferred to Kualanamu International Airport on 25 July 2013. Following the transfer, the airport's ICAO code was changed from WIMM to WIMK, as WIMM was reassigned to Kualanamu International Airport. Following the cessation of civil aviation operations, the former Polonia Airport became the Soewondo Air Force Base, operated by the Indonesian Air Force. The base hosts the Western Surveillance Wing, which operates eight CN-235 tactical surveillance aircraft.

== History ==
=== Colonial era ===
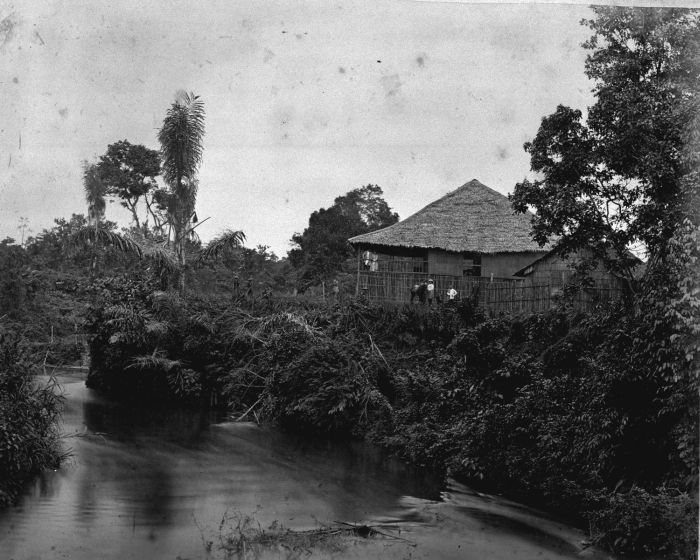
Michalski's house in the 1870s

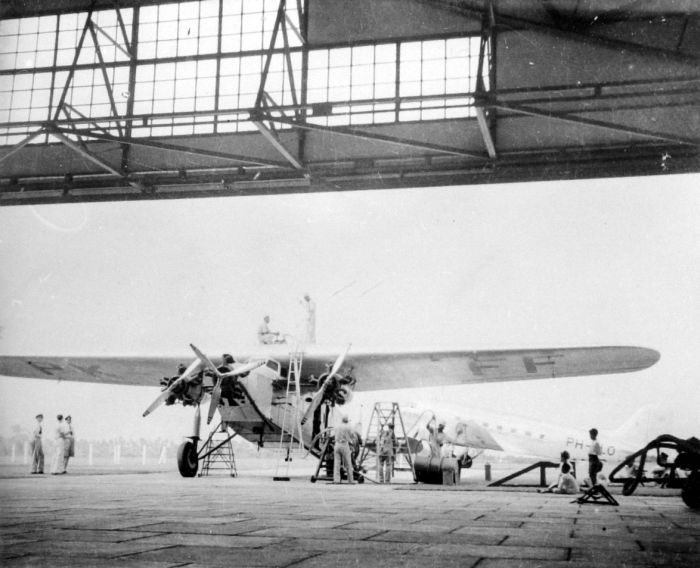
A Fokker F.VII at Polonia Airfield, 1940

The former name of the airport was derived from the Polonia plantation, which was owned by Polish nobleman Baron Ludwik Michalski and occupied the site of the present-day airport. “Polonia” is the Latin name for Poland. Michalski was a veteran of the 1863 January Uprising against Imperial Russian rule. Following the uprising, he fled to Switzerland. In 1872, Michalski obtained a concession from the Dutch East Indies administration to establish a tobacco plantation in Medan. He named the plantation after his country of birth, which at the time was not an independent state. In 1879, Michalski's concession was transferred to Deli Maatschappij (Deli MIJ), also known as NV Deli Maskapai.

In 1924, Dutch pilot N. J. Thomassen à Thuessink van der Hoop of KLM planned a pioneering flight from the Netherlands to the Dutch East Indies aboard a Fokker F.VII. As the existing site at Polonia had not yet been developed into an airfield, Deli MIJ, which controlled the land, made part of the plantation available for use as an airstrip. By the time the expedition reached Medan, however, there had been insufficient time to prepare a suitable landing strip at Polonia. Consequently, van der Hoop, accompanied by Lieutenant H. van Weerden Poelman of the Army Aviation Department and KLM flight engineer P. A. van den Broeke, landed instead at the Deli Renvereeniging horse-racing track. They were greeted by the Sultan of Deli, Sulaiman Syaiful Alamsyah. Following the landing, the Assistant Resident of Eastern Sumatra, C. S. van Kempen, urged the Netherlands East Indies administration in Batavia to provide funding for the development of an airfield at Polonia.

The airport was officially opened in 1928, when six aircraft operated by KNILM landed on a temporary hardened dirt runway. KNILM was a separate airline from KLM, despite their close association. From 1930, KLM and KNILM expanded their networks to Medan. The airport subsequently became a major aviation hub in North Sumatra, particularly serving affluent passengers. Demand for air travel was reportedly high, while the airport developed into the principal center of civil aviation in the province. The Dutch East Indies administration continued to improve and expand the airport, with its runway reaching a length of 600 metres by 1936. The airport also received aircraft operating international services from destinations in Singapore, Malaya, Siam, and elsewhere.

The airport's development was disrupted by the outbreak of the Second World War. On 11 December 1941, Japanese forces reportedly destroyed parts of the airport to prevent its use by Allied forces. After occupying the region, the Japanese rebuilt the airfield and used it as a military base. Throughout the war, the airport's location and proximity to the Strait of Malacca made it a strategically important airbase. As a result, it came under repeated Allied air attacks intended to limit Japanese control of the area, causing extensive damage to the airfield and its facilities. Following the Japanese surrender in 1945, the airfield was taken over by British forces and subsequently repaired and expanded by the Royal Engineers. In 1947, following the withdrawal of British forces, control of the airfield was transferred to the Royal Netherlands East Indies Army Air Force (ML-KNIL).

=== Post-independence era ===
Facade of Polonia International Airport, 2008

Following Indonesian independence and the Dutch recognition of Indonesian sovereignty in 1949, the Indonesian government began redeveloping the airport during the 1950s, including extending the runway to accommodate larger aircraft. Garuda Indonesia, the country's national flag carrier, subsequently began operating scheduled flights from the airport.

In the 1970s, the government further developed the airport, constructing a larger passenger terminal to accommodate the growing volume of passenger traffic. In 1975, under a joint decree issued by the Ministry of Defence, the Ministry of Transportation, and the Ministry of Finance, the airport came under joint management by the Indonesian Air Force and the civil aviation authorities.

From 1985, under Government Regulation No. 30 of 1975, management of the airport became the responsibility of Perum Angkasa Pura. The organization was subsequently reorganized as Angkasa Pura II on 1 January 1994.

With the opening of Kualanamu International Airport, Polonia Airport ceased commercial aviation operations and was replaced by the new airport. Its final commercial arrival was an AirAsia flight from Bandung, which landed at 23:50 WIB on 24 July 2013. The airport subsequently closed to commercial operations following an official closing ceremony at midnight. The final movements at Polonia consisted of ferry flights transferring aircraft and personnel to Kualanamu. Operations ceased at approximately 00:30 WIB. The first ferry flight, operated by a Garuda Indonesia aircraft, received a water salute before departing Polonia and again after arriving at Kualanamu. The flight carried Minister of State-Owned Enterprises Dahlan Iskan, the Deputy Minister of Transportation, and other government officials.

=== Contemporary period ===
Indonesian Air Force KT-1B Woongbis lining up at Soewondo Air Force Base

Following the completion of the ferry flights, all commercial aviation activity was transferred to Kualanamu International Airport. The former Polonia Airport was subsequently converted into a military airfield and became Soewondo Air Force Base, operated by the Indonesian Air Force. The airbase was named after Soewondo, an Indonesian Air Force officer and pilot who was killed in action during the PRRI rebellion in the 1950s. Due to its strategic location near the Strait of Malacca, the Indonesian Air Force has announced plans to station several air force squadrons at the airbase. The Indonesian Air Force initially planned to station up to three combat squadrons at the airfield, taking advantage of its extensive facilities following the takeover of the former civilian section of Polonia International Airport. The planned deployment was intended to strengthen Indonesia's air defense capabilities in the western part of the country.

Soewondo Air Force Base no longer meets operational and aviation safety standards due to the presence of high-rise buildings in its surrounding area. In addition, the airbase is located close to residential areas. As a result, the Indonesian Air Force is seeking a new location to replace Soewondo Air Force Base. The proposed replacement airbase would be located in Hamparan Perak District, Deli Serdang Regency, on a 1,170-hectare site. The land is currently under an active Cultivation Rights Title (HGU) held by PTPN II and is used for cultivating oil palms and sugarcane. Development of the replacement airbase would be carried out in two phases. The first phase would use approximately 600 hectares for the construction of the airbase, while the remaining 570 hectares would be retained as reserve land for potential future expansion.

The former civilian section of the airport, including its terminal, has since been abandoned and fallen into disrepair. The terminal was subsequently demolished in 2025.

== Facilities ==
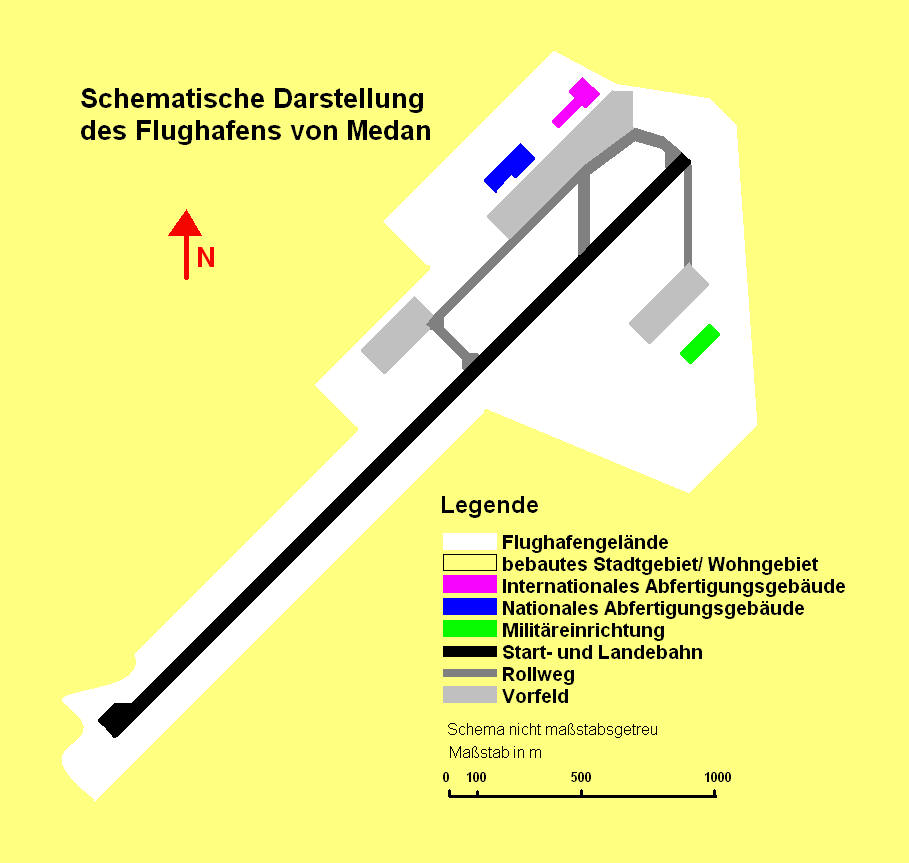
Polonia International Airport map

The airport is located on 144 hectares land area. There is a single asphalt runway (05/23) which is 3000 m long and 45 m wide, but has only 2,900 m of usable length. There is no run-off space beyond the runway thresholds, and the airfield is surrounded by residential areas. It is often said that its location in a residential district, the wealthy Polonia area, is due to a superstition that the loud noises from aircraft drive away malevolent spirits.

Prior to 2006, the airport consisted of an international and domestic terminal. A fire in the international arrivals area in 2006 caused damage to the airport, reducing the baggage reclaim area to a small section inside the terminal. On 2 December 2007, the domestic terminal was damaged by another fire. There were no injuries, and the separate international terminal was not affected. As a temporary measure, the government constructed a domestic terminal consisting of tent structures while plans for a permanent terminal building were being developed.

The airport suffered from overcrowding, serving 7.5 million passengers annually in facilities designed to handle only 900,000 passengers. The other problems were no orderly parking space for taxis, too many porters and garbage control. These problems should be resolved by the construction of Kualanamu International Airport. Construction commenced 29 June 2006. It became Indonesia's 2nd-largest airport after Soekarno–Hatta International Airport and commenced operations on 25 July 2013.

Once, there was a dilemma of whether or not to upgrade Polonia International Airport, due to the delay of the finishing of the new Kualanamu International Airport. This dilemma made Angkasa Pura II pledge to fix access roads between Mustang Street and Imam Bonjol Street.

== Accidents and incidents ==
- On 11 July 1979, a Fokker F28 of Garuda Indonesia Airways crashed into Mount Sibayak while on approach to Medan-Polonia airport. All 61 passengers and crew on board were killed.
- On 4 April 1987, Garuda Indonesia Flight 035, crashed into power lines and a television aerial in bad weather as it attempted landing at Medan-Polonia. 22 of the 45 passengers and crew on board were killed.
- On 18 June 1988, Vickers Viscount PK-MVG of Merpati Nusantara Airlines was damaged beyond economic repair when it suffered a hydraulic system failure and departed the runway.
- On 26 September 1997, Garuda Indonesia Flight 152, an Airbus A300, crashed into woodlands 18 miles short of Medan-Polonia airport. All 234 passengers and crew on board were killed. Flight 152 is the worst aviation disaster in Indonesia history.
- On 5 September 2005, Mandala Airlines Flight 091, crashed shortly after takeoff from Polonia. Of the 120 passengers and crew on board, 100 were killed. Another 49 people on the ground died as a result of the crash. It is the deadliest aviation accident involving the Boeing 737-200 series.
- On 30 June 2015, an Indonesian Air Force Hercules C-130 crashed shortly after takeoff, killing all 121 on board and 22 people on the ground in one of Indonesia's worst Lockheed C-130 Hercules crashes.

== See also ==
- List of airports in Indonesia
- Kuala Namu International Airport
