= Mount Sibayak =

Stratovolcano in northern Sumatra

- Gunung Sibayak (Indonesian); Deleng Sibayak (Karo)
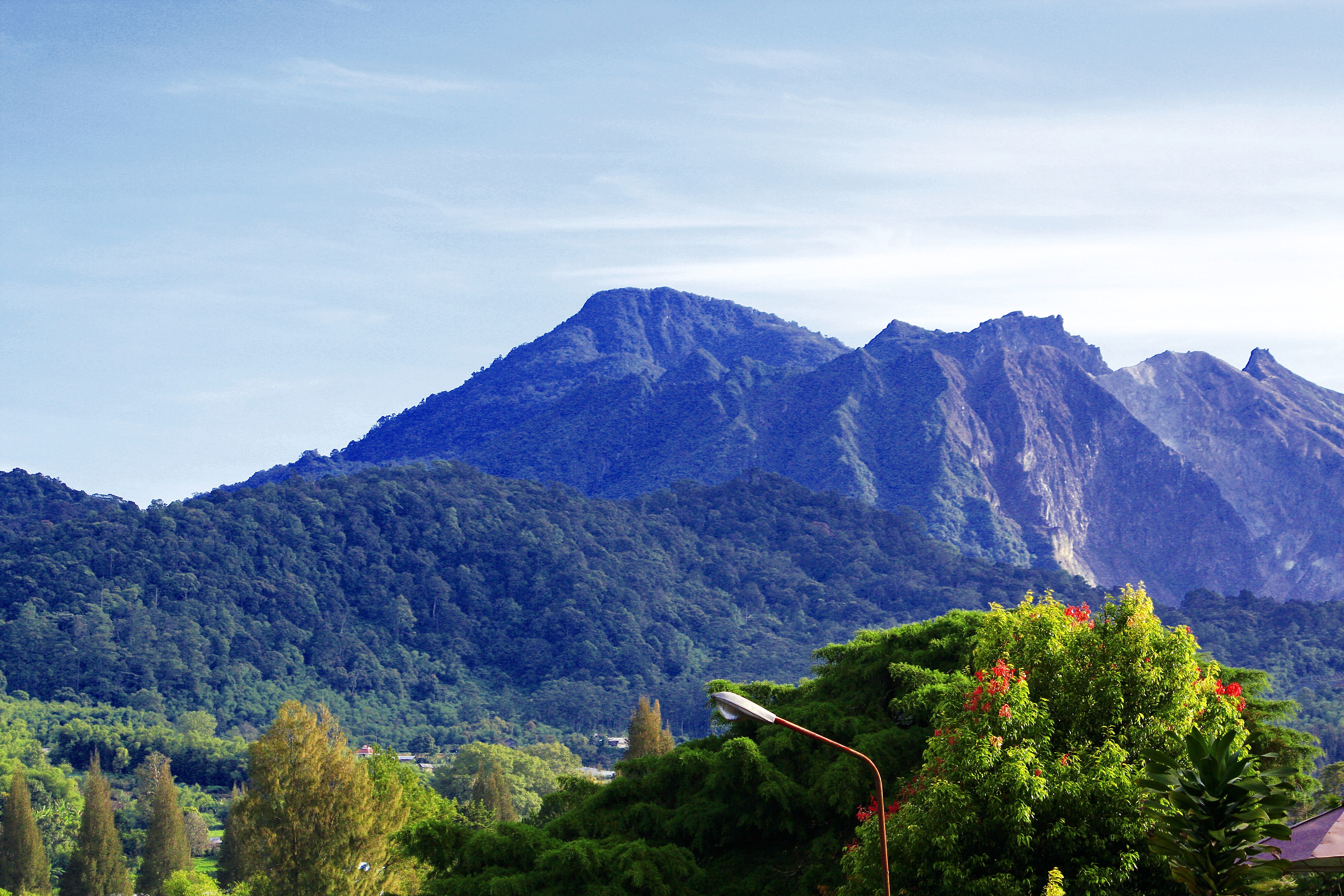
- Sibayak seen from the Southeast

Highest point
- Elevation: 2,181 m (7,156 ft)
- Listing: Ribu
- Coordinates: 3°14′21″N 98°30′20″E

Geography
- Location within Sumatra
- Location: Sumatra, Indonesia

Geology
- Mountain type: Stratovolcano
- Volcanic arc: Sunda Arc
- Last eruption: 1881

Mount Sibayak (Indonesian: Gunung Sibayak) is a stratovolcano overlooking the town of Berastagi in northern Sumatra, Indonesia. Although its last eruption was more than a century ago, geothermal activity in the form of steam vents and hot springs remains high on and around the volcano. The vents produce crystalline sulfur, which was mined on a small scale in the past. Seepage of sulfurous gases has also caused acidic discolouration of the small crater lake.

Sibayak is a term from the Karo Batak language referring to a founding community. Mount Sibayak is relatively easy to climb and has been a tourist attraction since colonial times.

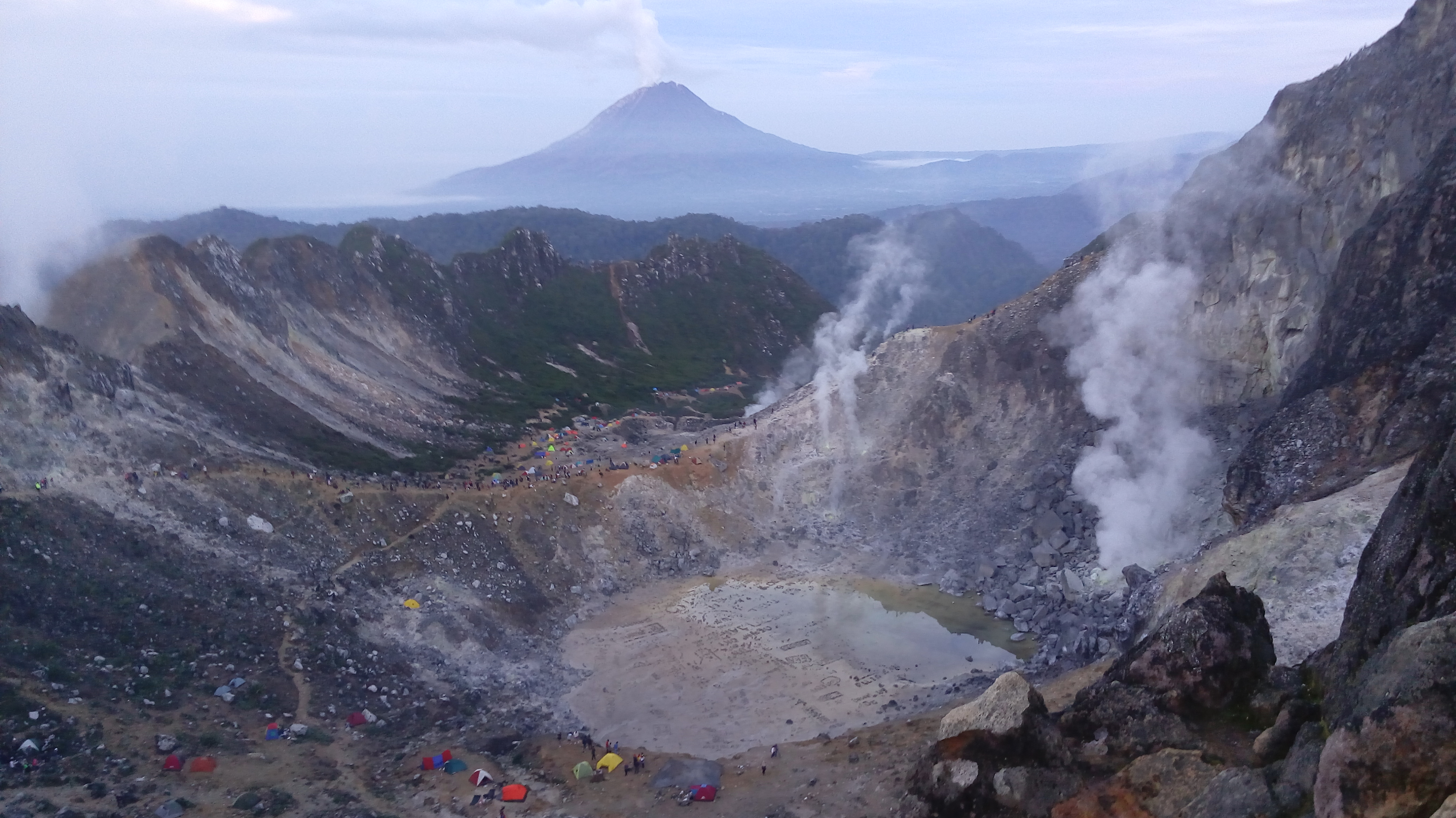
Crater of Gunung Sibayak. Mount Sinabung in the back.

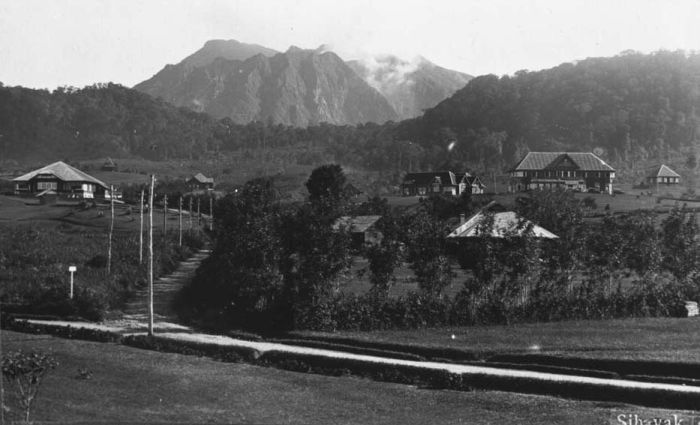
Mount Sibayak in the 1920s

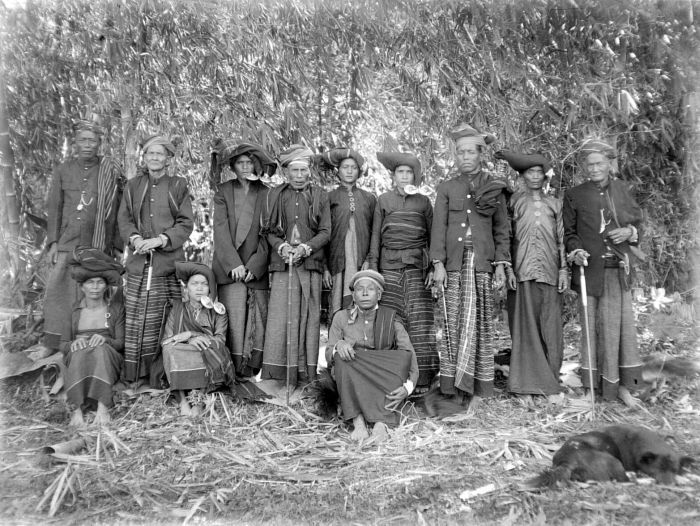
The "Sibajak raja berampat", the so-called four princes with their wives, Karolanden, North Sumatra (1914–1919)

On July 11, 1979, a Fokker F28 operating under Garuda Indonesian Airways crashed into this mountain.

== See also ==
- List of volcanoes in Indonesia
