= 1991 Jakarta Indonesian Air Force C-130 crash =

1991 aviation disaster in Jakarta, Indonesia

1991 Indonesian Air Force Lockheed C-130 Hercules crash
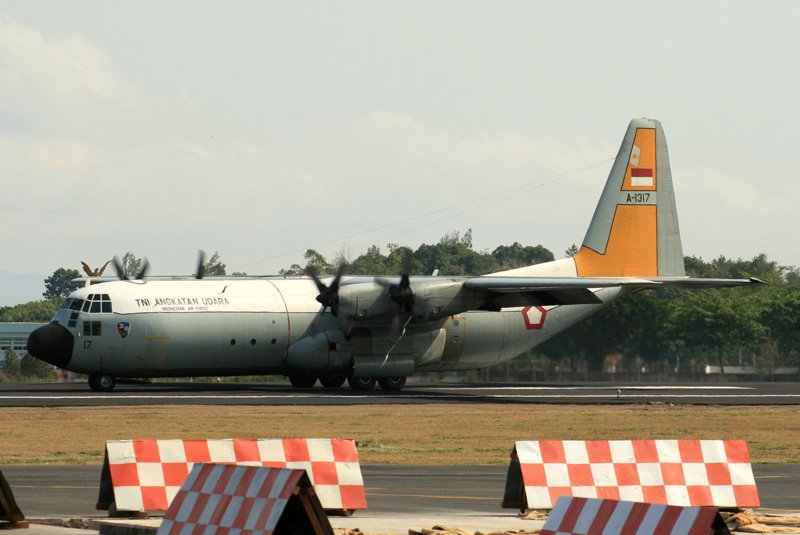
- A C-130H-30, sister to the accident aircraft

Accident
- Date: 5 October 1991
- Summary: Engine fire on takeoff
- Site: Near Jakarta-Halim Perdana Kusuma Airport; 6.179999°S 106.830001°E
- Total fatalities: 135 (2 on the ground)

Aircraft
- Aircraft type: Lockheed C-130H-30 Hercules
- Operator: Indonesian Air Force
- Registration: A-1324
- Flight origin: Jakarta-Halim Perdana Kusuma Airport
- Destination: Husein Sastranegara International Airport
- Occupants: 134
- Passengers: 122
- Crew: 12
- Fatalities: 133
- Injuries: 1
- Survivors: 1

Ground casualties
- Ground fatalities: 2

On 5 October 1991, an Indonesian Air Force Lockheed C-130H-30 Hercules crashed shortly after takeoff from Jakarta-Halim Perdana Kusuma Airport due to an engine fire. It killed all but one of the 134 people on board with an additional 2 people on the ground.

== Sequence of events ==
A-1324 (serial number - 4927, model L-82), was delivered from the 32nd Transport Squadron in June 1982. The military flight was from Jakarta to Bandung, and mainly consisted of Paskhas, (also called Orange Berets), returning to base after participating in an Indonesian Armed Forces Day ceremony.

The aircraft had a crew of 12 and 122 airman passengers. The aircraft departed at 15:00 local time when, according to eyewitnesses on the ground, one of the engines caught on fire. The fire presumably damaged the wing mechanism, causing the left engine to fail. The aircraft lost control, crashed into a public vocational training center of the Department of Labor, and exploded. Rescue operations were hampered by heavy rain which began an hour after the crash. One of the pilots, Major Samsul Ilham, was found in the wreckage alive but seriously injured. He later died in the hospital the same day.

A man survived the crash. Two people on the ground were also killed. With 135 fatalities, the crash was the deadliest aviation disaster to occur in Indonesia until the crash of Garuda Indonesia Flight 152 in 1997. It is now the sixth-deadliest.
