= Merpati Nusantara Airlines Flight 9760D =

2009 aviation accident

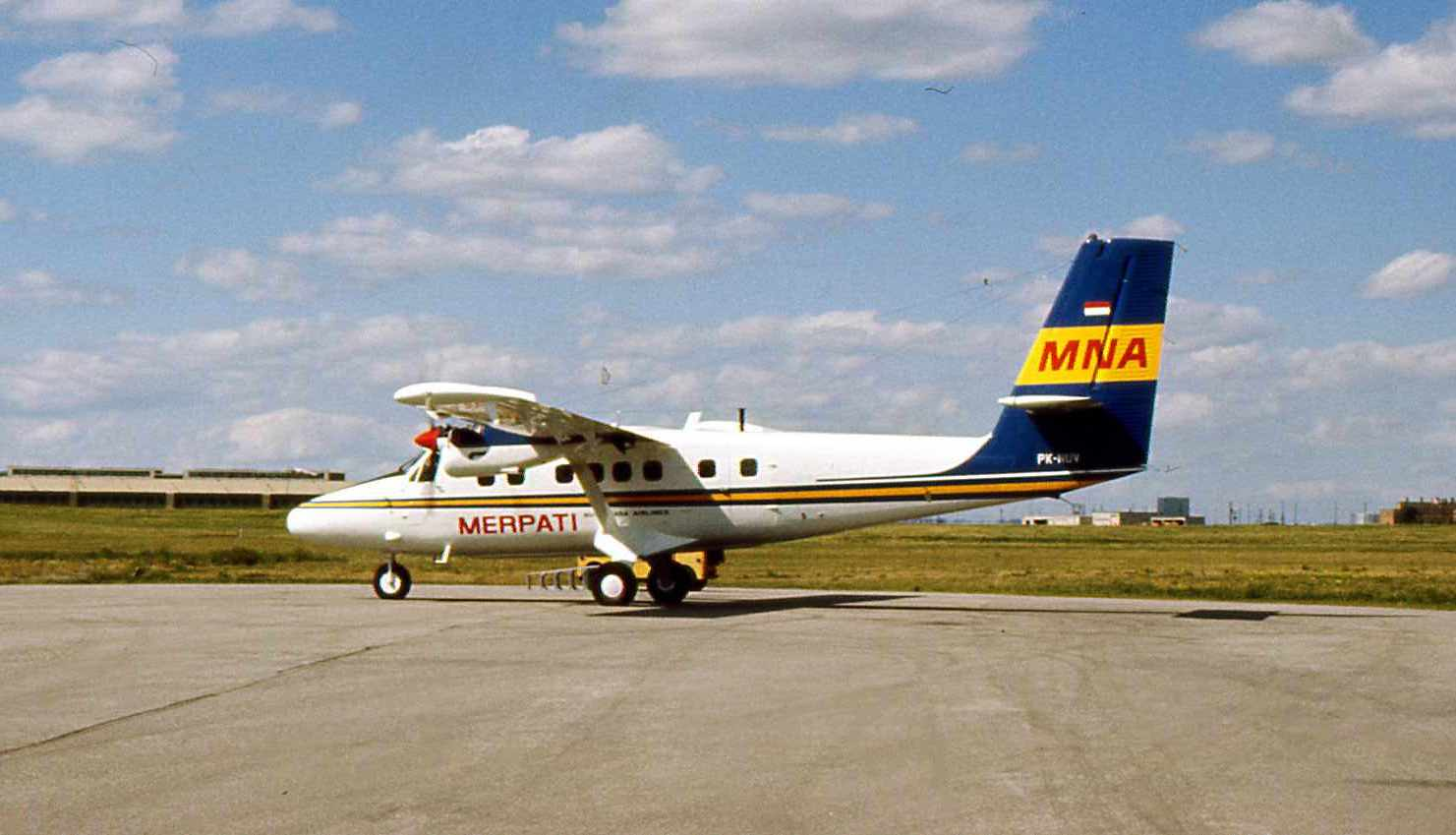
- A Merpati Nusantara Airlines DHC-6, similar aircraft to the one involved the crash

Accident
- Date: 2 August 2009
- Summary: Controlled flight into terrain caused by pilot error
- Site: Papua, Indonesia; 4°42′25″S 140°37′24″E

Aircraft
- Aircraft type: de Havilland Canada DHC-6 Twin Otter 300
- Operator: Merpati Nusantara Airlines
- IATA flight No.: MZ9760D
- ICAO flight No.: MNA9760D
- Call sign: MERPATI 9760D
- Registration: PK-NVC
- Flight origin: Sentani Airport, Jayapura (WAJJ)
- Destination: Oksibil Airport (WAJO)
- Occupants: 15
- Passengers: 12
- Crew: 3
- Fatalities: 15
- Survivors: 0

Merpati Nusantara Airlines Flight 9760D was a domestic commercial passenger 50-minutes flight, flying from Sentani Airport in Papua's Province Jayapura to Oksibil Airport in Oksibil, Indonesia operated by a de Havilland Canada DHC-6 Twin Otter 300. On Sunday, August 2, 2009, while carrying fifteen people over Papua, the aircraft went missing en route. Its wreckage was found a few miles from Oksibil two days later. All 12 passengers and 3 crew members were killed in the accident.

Indonesian Investigation Agency, NTSC released the final report and concluded that the cause of the crash was controlled flight into terrain (CFIT). The pilots did not maintain visual flight rules while flying below lowest safe altitude, thus impacting terrain. NTSC stated that the crash was "not survivable".

== Flight ==
Merpati Flight 9760D took off at 10:15 (local time) with an estimated time of arrival at Oksibil of 11:05. It was the second flight using the same aircraft; the first flight departed at 06.50 A.M local time. The flight was planned to use Visual Flight Rules instead of Instrument Flight Rules. Fuel was sufficient for at least 2 hours and 50 minutes. Flight crews did not report any problems related to the aircraft as the plane took off from Sentani Airport. But then, at 10:28, the plane lost contact with air traffic control. The Control Tower frantically tried to contact the missing plane, but no response was received. The plane later missed the scheduled arrival. An "Uncertainty Phase" was later declared by the tower.

The plane still was missing at 13:05 P.M. At this point, the plane should have run out of fuel. A search team was assembled by Indonesian National Search and Rescue Agency (BASARNAS). Two days later, the wreckage of the plane was found at the elevation of 9,300 feet (2,800 m). All fifteen people on board were fatally injured. The plane was found disintegrated due to massive impact forces when it hit terrain. The impact force was so large that no one could survive the crash.

The plane had apparently crashed in good weather. Another aircraft in the vicinity informed Flight 9760D that the weather around Oksibil Airport was partly cloudy. The aircraft, a DHC-6-300 with tail number PK-NVC was a 30-year-old airframe and was not equipped with a flight data recorder.

== Aircraft ==
The aircraft involved in the accident was a de Havilland Canada DHC-6 registered as PK-NVC with serial number 626. The aircraft was manufactured in 1979 and was acquired in 2007. It has over 30,000 flying hours and was equipped with a turbo propeller from Pratt & Whitney Canada.

== Passengers and crew ==
Fifteen people were aboard the flight, including three crew and twelve passengers. All of them were Indonesian. The passengers consisted of ten adults and two infants, while the crews consisted of two pilots and one flight engineer. The Captain had logged 8,387 hours of flying experience. The First Officer had logged 1,207 hours of flying experience.

== Investigation ==
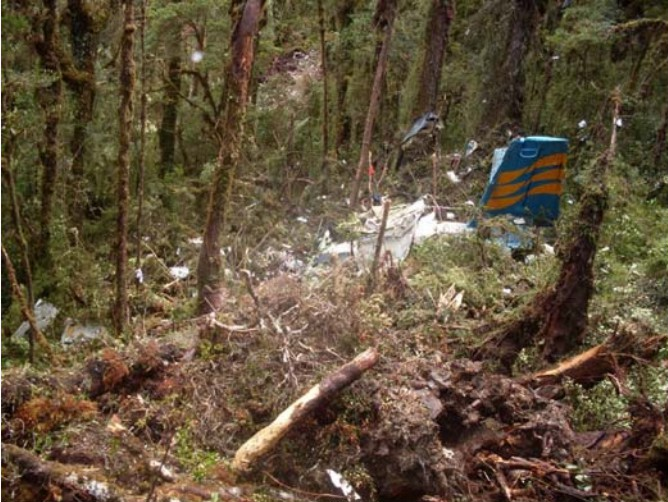
The wreckage of Flight 9760D after the crash

The Indonesian National Transportation Safety Committee (NTSC) opened an investigation into the accident. The cause was found to be controlled flight into terrain. In the report, Merpati Nusantara Airlines were stated not to have fully co-operated with the NTSC as they had not provided the investigators full details of the crew's line checks and training undertaken.

The National Transportation Safety Committee found that there were no maintenance defects found on the aircraft. The aircraft was also loaded with cargo within limits, ruling out overloading. The weather in the area of the flight was reported by local villagers to have been mostly clear in the valleys, with clouds on the mountains and slopes. About 25 minutes prior to the accident, the crews contacted another crew from a Lockheed C-130 Hercules aircraft owned by the Indonesian Air Force which was flying from Oksibil to Sentani and said that they were 100 miles from Jayapura en route to Oksibil. The pilot of the Hercules informed the crew of Flight 9760D that over Oksibil the cloud base was low, with cloud tops between 6,000 and 7,000 feet (1,800 and 2,100 m). As the cloud tops were 12,500 feet (3,800 m), the Hercules pilot informed the crew of Flight 9760D they would have to detour via Kiriwok to avoid the clouds.

The aircraft was not equipped with a flight data recorder (FDR). Indonesian regulations did not require a FDR to be fitted to the Twin Otter aircraft. However, the aircraft was equipped with a Cockpit Voice Recorder (CVR). Indonesian Civil Aviation regulations required that a serviceable CVR was to be fitted to the Twin Otter aircraft. Search and Rescue personnel recovered the CVR from the wreckage and handed it over to NTSC investigators. The outer box had minor damage, but the contents were undamaged. About 20 minutes before the impact, the pilots were discussing the area they were flying over, and made comments about the local inhabitants. Fifteen minutes before impact, the pilot in command said to the copilot "Let's fly direct Oksibil". The copilot asked "Direct brother?" The PIC replied "Direct, the sky is blue over there and the layer of the cloud is 10,000 feet". One minute later the copilot gave a position report to ATC stating: One two three zero traffic, Merpati nine seven six zero delay, Sentani to Oksibil, position approaching Melam maintain nine thousand five hundred, estimate Abmisibil zero two zero one, arrival zero two zero eight. This transmission was blocked by other transmissions and there was no evidence on recorded communications that the position report was acknowledged by ATC.

During the 20 minutes before the impact there was no discussion about aircraft problems or navigation difficulties. However, ten minutes before impact the pilot in command mentioned climbing to 10,000 feet (3,000 m), and stated "if we cannot go visual I will turn left". The cockpit conversations did not exhibit any signs of stress or concern until 2 minutes before the impact, when the copilot mentioned haze and asked the pilot in command if he could see. Fifty seconds before impact, the copilot expressed further concern and asked about the pilot in command’s intentions, and the pilot in command said "climb, to the left". Forty-two seconds before impact the copilot asked if it was safe on the left. The copilot became increasingly uncertain about the safety of the flight, specifically mentioning visibility and speed. From the recorded sounds, it is apparent that 13 seconds before impact, engine power was increased symmetrically to a high power setting. From the pilots' comments and the wreckage trail, the investigation determined that the aircraft was banking left at the time of impact. The investigation was unable to determine if the aircraft reached 10,000 feet. The impact was at 9,300 feet (2,800 m).

== See also ==
- Aviastar Flight 7503
- Trigana Air Flight 267
