= Flight 106 =

Flight 106 may refer to:

Listed chronologically

- Civil Air Transport Flight 106, crashed on 20 June 1964
- Trans World Airlines Flight 106, hijacked on 21 November 1971
- Merpati Nusantara Airlines Flight 106, crashed on 19 April 1997

== See also ==
- STS-106, a successful Space Shuttle mission in September 2000
