= 2023 Oksibil attacks =

Events in Highland Papua, Indonesia

2023 Oksibil conflict
- Part of the Papua conflict
Date	7–12 January 2023 (5 days)
Location	Oksibil, Bintang Mountains, Highland Papua
Result	Indonesian victory

Combatants
Indonesia	(Free Papua Movement) West Papua National Liberation Army

Units involved
Indonesian Army	35th Regional Defence Commando

Casualties and losses
- 3 wounded
- 150 civilians internally displaced 1 civilian airplane damaged

The 2023 Oksibil attacks were conducted by the separatist West Papua National Liberation Army (TPNPB) periodically on Oksibil, the seat of Bintang Mountains Regency, Highland Papua from 7 January to 12 January 2023. According to the Regional Police of Papua, the Bintang Mountains is one of 7 regencies that are vulnerable to separatist attacks.

== Background ==
Sebby Sambom, the spokesman for TPNPB and OPM, disclosed on January 7 that the 35th Regional Defense Commando "Eastern Stars" (Indonesian: Kodap XXXV Bintang Timur) planned to kill Indonesian policemen, destroy police vehicles, and burn down a 4G tower in Oksibil.

== Timeline ==
=== 7 January: Shootout with TPNPB armed group ===
Combined TNI-Polri forces engaged in a shootout with an armed group on Kabiding Road for two hours. The altercation began when La Ode Jamaludin, a motorcycle taxi driver (Ojek), reported to local police that he had been shot on a bridge on Yapimakot Road. After the combined forces successfully repelled the armed group, they fled into a nearby forest. According to Inspector General Mathius D. Fakhiri, three police officers—Second Inspector Jenudin, Police Brigadier Freying, and First Brigadier Romsumbre—were injured in the shootout.

=== 9 January 2023: Burning of a school and airliner attacks ===
An armed group, possibly led by Nelson Mimin or Ananias Ati Mimin, burned down a classroom and the teachers' room in the state vocational school SMKN 1 Oksibil building at around 10:30 AM local time. They also shot at Trigana and Dimonim Air aircraft, at 10:21 AM and 10:35 AM local time, respectively. For Trigana Air, a cargo Ikairos Caravan registered under PK-HVV, piloted by Captain Tohirin, was attacked when landing from Tanahmerah, Boven Digoel Regency. After the attack, the aircraft returned to Tanah Merah.

Because of the airliner attacks, Trigana Air temporarily suspended flights to and from Oksibil. On January 12, the state-owned air traffic controller, AirNav Indonesia, evacuated all personnel from Oksibil Airport to Jayapura. The armed group threatened to harm the newcomers if they did not leave the Bintang Mountains area.

Spokesperson of the Free Papua Movement National Army - West Papua Revolutionary Organization (TPN-OPM), Sebby Sambom, declared his party's responsibility for the terrorist attack in the Bintang Mountains on Tuesday. The attack, which claimed the life of Police Brigadier Rudi Agung, was orchestrated by Anaias Mimin. "We will continue targeting the TNI-Polri forces stationed in the Bintang Mountains. Our objective is singular: to attain a referendum for Papua," Sebby asserted.

=== 11 January 2023: Burning of Dukcapil office ===
The 35th Regional Defense Commando (Kodap) of TPNPB ignited a fire at a Department of Population and Civil Record (Disdukcapil) office around 01:30 AM local time, which was finally extinguished around 03:15 AM local time.

=== 12 January 2023: Damaging of water pipe ===
In Mabilabol village, Oksibil, an armed group led by Ananias Ati Mimin damaged a water pipe at 2:00 PM local time. Two days later, they also fired at a TNI aircraft ten times in Yapimakot village, Serambakon district, near Oksibil.

== Impacts ==
Commander of Korem 172/PWY, Brigadier General JO Sembiring, stated that the economy in Oksibil was paralyzed by the separatist conflicts. Impacted civilians evacuated themselves to the Koramil 1705-01 base and An-Nur Mosque. By 13 January, 150 civilians in Oksibil had been internally displaced due to the engagement. The Head of the National Human Rights Commission (Komnas HAM) Representative in Papua, Frits Ramandey, stated that there were two new autonomous regions, Central Papua Province and the Papua Highlands, that were at risk of security disturbance in 2023.
