= H.A.S. Hanandjoeddin International Airport =

Airport in Tanjungpandan, Bangka Belitung Islands, Indonesia

H.A.S. Hanandjoeddin International Airport Bandar Udara Internasional H.A.S. Hanandjoeddin
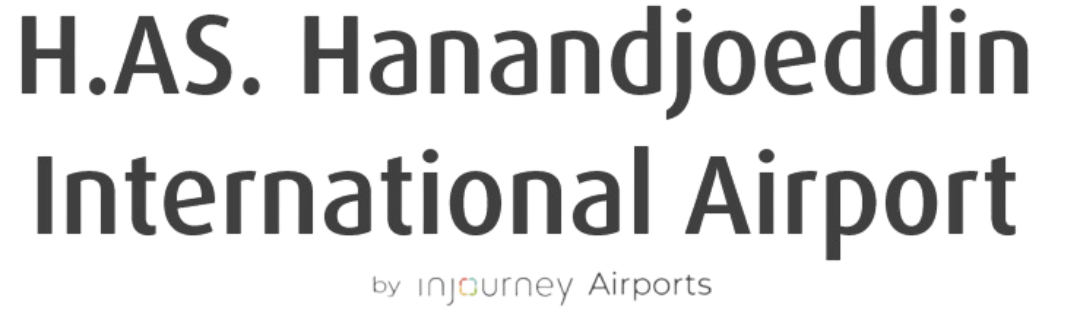

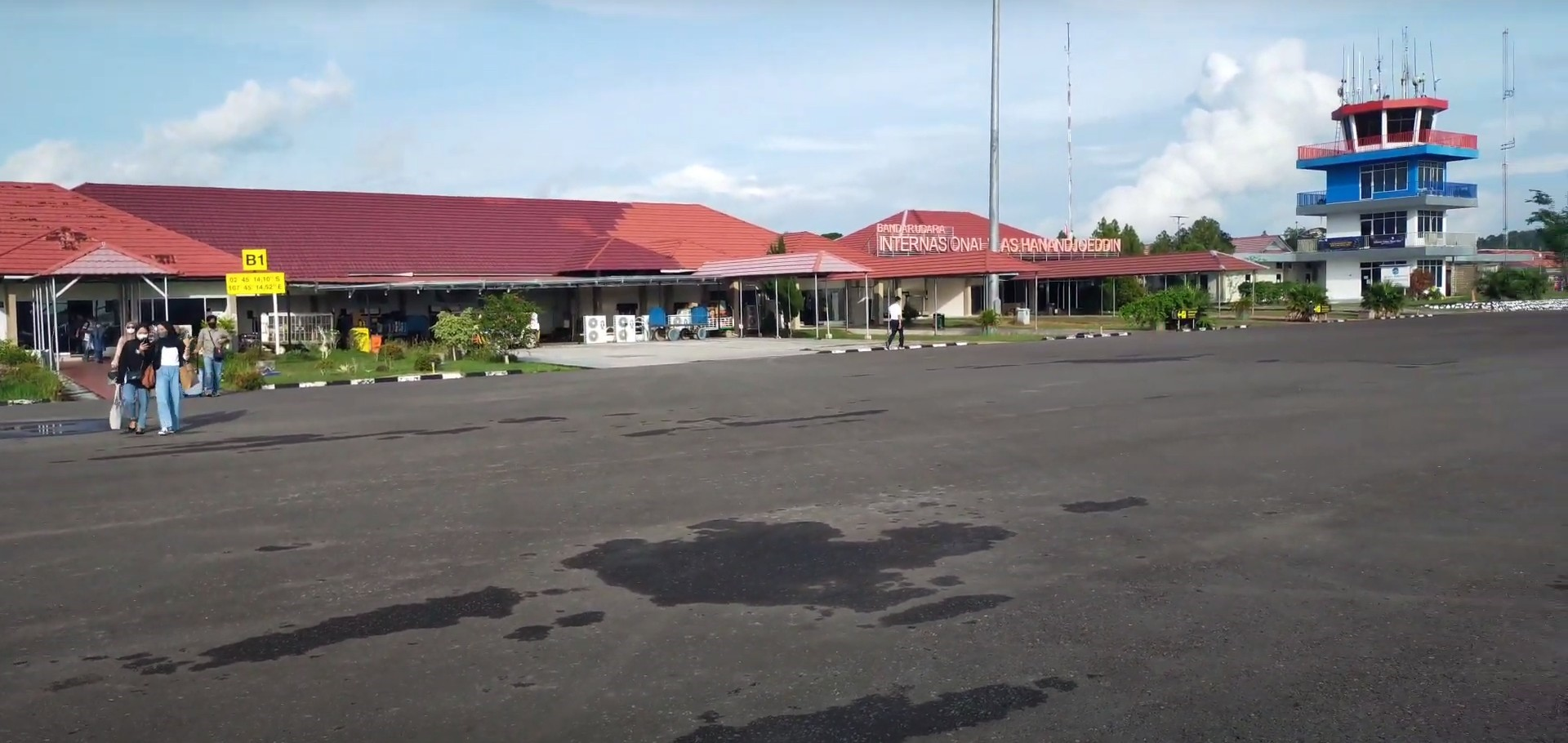
- IATA: TJQ; ICAO: WIKT

Summary
- Airport type: Public / Military
- Owner: Government of Indonesia
- Operator: InJourney Airports
- Serves: Tanjung Pandan
- Location: Buluh Tumbang, Tanjung Pandan, Belitung, Bangka Belitung Islands, Indonesia
- Built: 1943; 83 years ago
- Time zone: WIB (UTC+07:00)
- Elevation AMSL: 164 ft (50 m)
- Coordinates: 02°44′44″S 107°45′17″E

Map
- Location of airport in Sumatra

Runways
Direction	Length		Surface
Direction	m	ft	Surface
18/36	2,500	8,202	Asphalt

Statistics (2024)
- Passengers: 560,072 (▼13.9%)
- Cargo (tonnes): 4,484 (▼13.2%)
- Aircraft movements: 4,209 (▼18.0%)
- Source: DGCA

H.A.S. Hanandjoeddin International Airport (IATA: TJQ, ICAO: WIKT), formerly known as Buluh Tumbang Airport, is an international airport serving Tanjung Pandan, the largest town on Belitung Island in the Bangka Belitung Islands province of Indonesia. Named after Haji Ahmad Sanusi Hanandjoeddin, a pioneer of the Indonesian Air Force from Belitung and a former regent of Belitung Regency, the airport is the only airport on Belitung Island and serves as the main gateway to Tanjung Pandan and the island as a whole. The airport currently operates domestic flights to Jakarta, the capital of Indonesia, and Pangkalpinang, the provincial capital, as well as international flights to Singapore. It previously operated international flights to Kuala Lumpur, Malaysia, but these services were suspended during the COVID-19 pandemic. As a result of the pandemic, the airport's international status was revoked in 2024, but was reinstated in 2025.

In addition to serving as a commercial airport, the airport is also the site of the H.A.S. Hanandjoeddin Air Force Base, a Type C facility of the Indonesian Air Force.

== History ==
=== Construction and early history ===
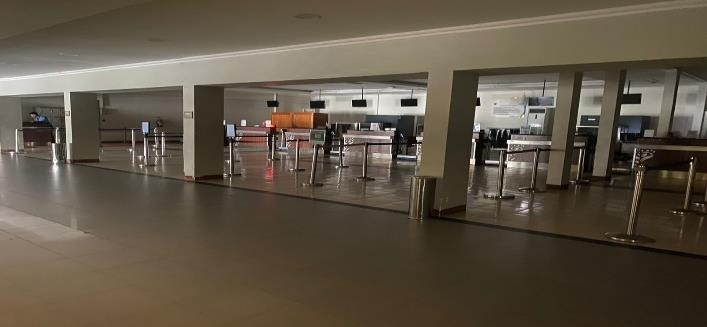
Check-in area

The airport was built in the early 1940s during the Japanese occupation of the Dutch East Indies in the Pacific Theater of World War II. To support their military operations, the occupying forces collaborated with employees of the Dutch tin mining company Billiton Maatschappij and local residents to construct an airfield in Buluh Tumbang. The facility was intended to enhance Japan’s strategic and logistical capabilities on Belitung Island during the occupation. Construction of the airstrip began in 1943, using the forced labor of local residents from Buluh Tumbang and nearby villages under the Japanese-imposed romusha system. Despite the harsh conditions, this labor produced a basic but functional airstrip capable of accommodating Japanese aircraft. When the Japanese surrendered in 1945, its troops withdrew from Belitung Island in August, leaving the airstrip in Buluh Tumbang behind without formally handing it over to any authority.

On October 18, 1945, a Dutch PBY Catalina amphibious aircraft landed in Belitung, bringing three Dutch nationals, former employees of Billiton Maatschappij, to resume the island’s tin mining operations. The reestablishment of Billiton Maatschappij on Belitung Island significantly influenced the development of the Buluh Tumbang Airstrip, transforming it into a crucial transportation hub, primarily serving Dutch interests. Over time, Billiton Maatschappij took control of the airstrip, while the Dutch airline KLM Interinsulair Bedrijf set up a branch in Belitung, operating Douglas DC-3 aircraft.

Following the Dutch withdrawal from Belitung and the transfer of sovereignty to the newly formed Indonesian government, Buluh Tumbang Airport was initially placed under the management of the Public Works Department. In 1954, administrative control was handed over to the Civil Aviation Service, which later became the Directorate General of Civil Aviation under the Ministry of Transportation. On April 11, 1958, the Indonesian Air Force began operations in Tanjungpandan with the establishment of an Air Force Liaison Detachment based at the airport. The detachment was later elevated to the status of an airbase in 1966.

=== Contemporary history ===
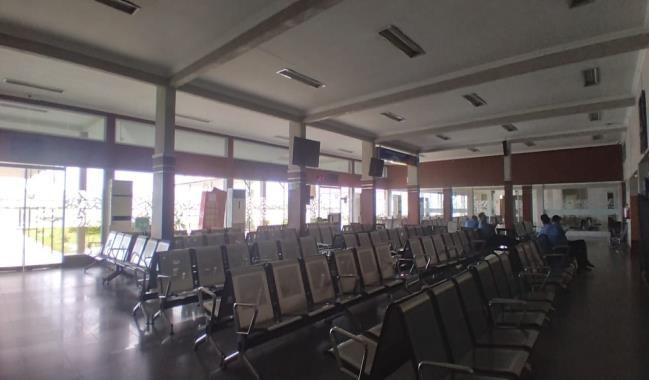
Boarding gate

By the 1970s, the government had begun planning the airport's development, including extending its runway to accommodate aircraft such as the Fokker F27, as the runway at the time measured only 871 m × 30 m (2,858 ft × 98 ft). Further development took place in the 1980s to enable the airport to accommodate larger aircraft such as the Fokker F28, while additional runway facilities, including a DVOR navigation system and runway lighting, were also installed. At the time, the airport was already connected to Jakarta, with services operated by airlines such as Garuda Indonesia, Mandala Airlines, and Merpati Nusantara Airlines, as well as to Palembang, with flights operated by Merpati Nusantara Airlines.

In 1998, the airport was renamed to its current name in honor of Lieutenant Colonel Haji Ahmad Sanusi Hanandjoeddin, a native of Belitung who served as a pilot and officer in the Indonesian Air Force during the National Revolution. He later went on to serve as the regent of Belitung.

In 2017, to accommodate the growing number of foreign tourists visiting Belitung, the airport was upgraded to international status. The following year, Garuda Indonesia launched the first international route from Tanjung Pandan to Singapore using a Bombardier CRJ-1000. In 2019, AirAsia followed by opening a route to Kuala Lumpur with an Airbus A320. However, due to the COVID-19 pandemic, all international flights were suspended in 2020, and the airport was temporarily closed for several months to help contain the spread of the virus. As international flights failed to resume, the airport’s international status was revoked in April 2024, but it was reinstated in 2025. Flights to Singapore subsequently resumed in May 2026, this time operated by Scoot.

In 2019, management of the airport was transferred from the Directorate General of Civil Aviation to Angkasa Pura II, which has since been rebranded as InJourney Airports. Following the management takeover, Angkasa Pura II announced plans to invest up to 559 billion rupiah in the development of the airport, including improvements to the runway and other airport facilities.

== Facilities and development ==
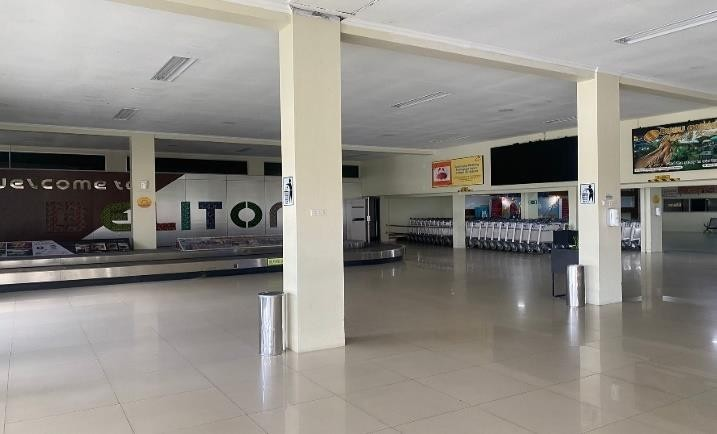
Baggage claim area

The airport has a single passenger terminal with an annual capacity of 250,000 passengers. A minor renovation was carried out in 2022 to prepare for the G20 Ministerial Meeting held in Belitung. The terminal is equipped with various facilities, including an ATM center, children's playgrounds, a VIP lounge, a smoking room, restaurants, a parking area, and a money changer. Plans are currently underway to revitalize the airport in response to the growing number of passengers and increasing air traffic. As part of the development, the apron will be relocated and integrated with a new terminal equipped with jet bridges. Spanning an area of up to 420 hectares, the new terminal is projected to accommodate up to six million passengers annually over the next 30 years. The new terminal is planned to be designed in the traditional architectural style of Belitung Malay culture. The first phase of the development includes the construction of the new terminal and the upgrading of existing infrastructure, such as runway resurfacing, installation of jet bridges, and enhancements to administrative facilities. An estimated 800 billion rupiah has been allocated to support this development initiative.

On the airside, the airport features a runway measuring 2,500 m × 45 m (8,202 ft × 148 ft), which was extended from its previous length of 2,250 m (7,382 ft) in 2023. This runway is capable of accommodating narrow-body aircraft such as the Boeing 737 and Airbus A320. The runway was initially planned to be extended to 2,635 m (8,645 ft), but the project was subsequently shelved due to budgetary constraints faced by the Bangka-Belitung provincial government. In addition to the runway, the airport is equipped with two taxiways connecting the runway to the apron, each measuring 67 m × 23 m (220 ft × 75 ft), while the apron measures 235 m × 87 m (771 ft × 285 ft)..

== Airlines and destinations ==
Airlines	Destinations
Citilink	Jakarta–Soekarno-Hatta
Scoot	Singapore
Sriwijaya Air	Jakarta–Soekarno-Hatta
Super Air Jet	Jakarta–Soekarno-Hatta, Pangkal Pinang
Wings Air	Pangkal Pinang (resumes 25 March 2027)

== Statistics ==
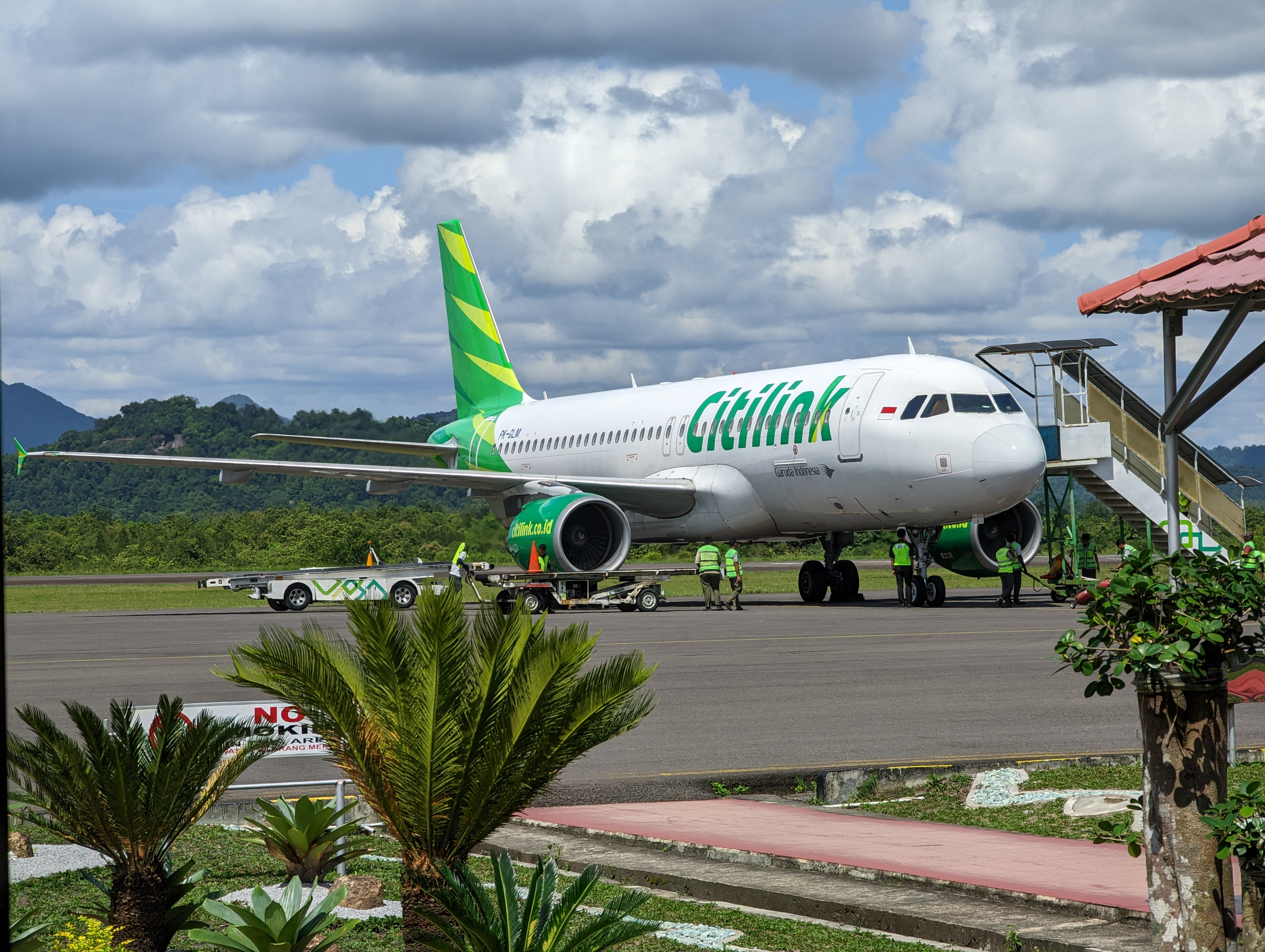
A Citilink Airbus A320 on standby at H.A.S. Hanandjoeddin International Airport

Annual passenger numbers and aircraft statistics
Year	Passengers handled	Passenger % change	Cargo (tonnes)	Cargo % change	Aircraft movements	Aircraft % change
2006	370,296	Steady	1,636	Steady	4,096	Steady
2007	178,431	▼51.8	949	▼42.0	2,062	
2008	213,808	▲19.8	1,067	▲12.4	2,594	▼49.7
2009	269,781	▲26.2	951	▼10.9	2,598	▲25.8
2010	336,399	▲24.7	1,219	▲28.2	2,948	▲0.2
2011	398,136	▲18.4	1,788	▲46.7	3,620	▲22.8
2012	481,251	▲20.9	1,747	▼2.3	4,698	▲29.8
2013	478,971	▼0.5	1,691	▼3.2	5,532	▲17.8
2014	628,760	▲31.3	2,435	▲44.0	5,526	▼0.1
2015	501,532	▼20.2	1,680	▼31.0	4,408	▼20.2
2016	547,024	▲9.1	2,019	▲20.2	5,012	▲13.7
2017	390,039	▼28.7	1,271	▼37.0	3,618	▼27.8
2018	1,128,877	▲189.4	3,550	▲179.3	10,264	▲183.7
2019	906,681	▼19.7	2,971	▼16.3	9,254	▼9.8
2020	314,124	▼65.4	2,947	▼0.8	4,456	▼51.8
2021	310,324	▼1.2	5,384	▲82.7	4,211	▼5.5
2022	600,740	▲93.6	5,253	▼2.4	5,586	▲32.7
2023	650,663	▲8.3	5,163	▼1.7	5,132	▼8.1
2024	560,072	▼13.9	4,484	▼13.2	4,209	▼18.0
^{Source: DGCA, BPS}

== Accidents and incidents ==
- On 19 April 1997, a British Aerospace ATP aircraft owned by Merpati Airlines, flight number 106, crashed while approaching the airport. The aircraft reportedly went into a steep left bank as it descended through 2,000 feet (610 m). The crew lost control of the plane, and it crashed breaking into three pieces. Twelve passengers and three crew members died in the accident. Investigation found one of the propellers to be feathered.
