= Merpati Nusantara Airlines Flight 5601 =

1992 aviation accident in Indonesia

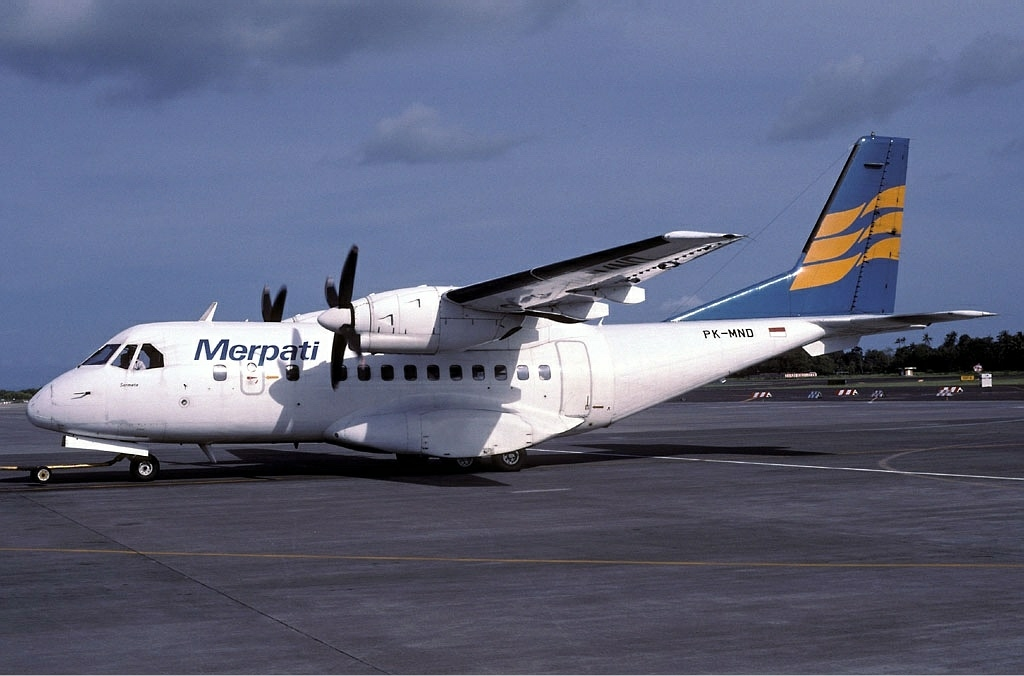
- PK-MND, sister ship to the accident aircraft.

Accident
- Date: 18 October 1992
- Summary: Controlled flight into terrain due to pilot error and bad weather
- Site: Mount Papandayan, 30 km (19 mi; 16 nmi) west of Garut, West Java, Indonesia

Aircraft
- Aircraft type: CASA/IPTN CN-235-100
- Aircraft name: Trangadi
- Operator: Merpati Nusantara Airlines
- Registration: PK-MNN
- Flight origin: Achmad Yani International Airport, Semarang, Indonesia
- Destination: Husein Sastranegara International Airport, Bandung, Indonesia
- Occupants: 31
- Passengers: 27
- Crew: 4
- Fatalities: 31
- Survivors: 0

Merpati Nusantara Airlines Flight 5601 (MNA5601/MZ5601) was a domestic scheduled passenger flight from Semarang to Bandung, Indonesia. On 18 October 1992, the two-year-old CASA/IPTN CN-235-10 was on approach to Bandung when it crashed into Mount Puntang, near Mount Papandayan, West Java, Indonesia at 1:30 pm in bad weather. The aircraft exploded on impact, killing all twenty-seven passengers and four crew on board.

The crash of flight 5601 was the first known fatal crash involving the CASA/IPTN CN235. To date, it remains as the worst ever civilian aviation disaster involving a CASA/IPTN CN-235. The National Transportation Safety Committee (NTSC) concluded that the cause of the crash was pilot error aggravated by adverse weather conditions.

== Aircraft ==
The aircraft was a CASA/IPTN CN235, an aircraft made by a joint venture of Indonesia's IPTN and Spain's CASA. The aircraft was newly delivered to Merpati Nusantara Airlines, manufactured in 1990 with a manufacturing serial number of N.013. The technical logs indicated that the aircraft was in airworthy condition. The aircraft had been in service for more than 2,000 flight hours and was among the first CN235 aircraft to be operated in Indonesia.

== Passengers and crew ==
The aircraft was carrying thirty-one passengers and crew, consisting of twenty-seven passengers and four crew members, all of whom were Indonesians. At least three children were on board the aircraft.

The commander of the flight was 29-year-old Captain Fierda Basaria Soara Panggabean, one of the first female pilots in Indonesia. She had logged in more than 6.000 hours of flight experience, most of which were on the CN235. Before flying with the CN235, she had flown with a Twin Otter for short routes in Java and Papua. The co-pilot was identified as First Officer Adnan S. Paago from Jakarta and the cabin crew members were Rita Rusliati and Ketty.

== Flight ==
Flight 5601 was a scheduled domestic passenger flight from Achmad Yani International Airport, Semarang to Husein Sastranegara International Airport, Bandung. It took off at 13:05 local time and was expected to arrive at around 14:30 local time. The aircraft was carrying 31 passengers and crew members, with Captain Panggabean as the pilot flying and First Officer Paago as the pilot monitoring. The weather at the time of take-off was in clear condition, but due to the ongoing monsoon season, the weather in the west of Java was expected to be in adverse condition.

The flight was mainly uneventful until its approach to Bandung. At 13:35 local time, Flight 5601 made its first radio contact with the ATC in Bandung. The crew stated that they were flying at 12,500 ft and were ready for an approach to the airport. The ATC informed that the weather in the area was deteriorating, with showers and thunders expected along the route and a limited visibility of around 4 to 5 kilometres (2.5 to 3.1 mi; 2.2 to 2.7 nmi). He eventually advised Flight 5601 to maintain their altitude, which was read back by the crew.

While flying over Cirebon, after receiving reports of the inclement weather condition throughout West Java, Captain Panggabean opted to continue with the approach. Knowing that the visibility in the expected route had deteriorated, the crew also requested for a different flight rule, opting to use the visual flight rules (VFR) instead. The ATC worker in Bandung approved, and at 13:40 local time, the aircraft proceeded to Bandung with VFR. Following reports of cumulonimbus clouds covering the northern area of West Java, the aircraft turned to the south.

Since the airport was located within a valley, the aircraft had to flew above mountainous terrain surrounding the city of Bandung. After passing Tasikmalaya, the aircraft began to turn towards Garut. At 13:42 local time, Captain Panggabean contacted ATC on their intention to descent to 8,500 ft, which was approved. This was the last contact between Flight 5601 and the ATC. Approximately 16 minutes later, the aircraft impacted terrain at a speed of 420 kilometres per hour (230 kn) and exploded, killing everyone on board instantly. At the time, the area of the crash was covered with heavy fog.

== Response ==
As Flight 5601 missed its scheduled time of arrival, it was declared as missing and a search and rescue mission was commenced. The crash site was eventually found on the next day in a forested area near Cipaganti, Garut. Nearby residents had reported of hearing the sound of a massive explosion at around 14:00 local time on the day of the accident, however no one knew that it had been caused by a crashing aircraft.

The site was located at an altitude of 2,000 ft on Mount Puntang, around 60 km southeast of Bandung. When it was found, the wreckage was still smoldering. Only a few portions of the wings and the tailplane remained intact, while the remainder were strewn across a concentrated area. The wreckage suggested that the flight crew had tried to climb, citing the nose up position of the aircraft. Access to the area was rendered as difficult, with rescuers had to walk on foot for around three hours before reaching the site.

Most of the bodies were burnt beyond recognition; however, all were able to be recovered from the site. Both flight recorders were also eventually recovered by rescue personnel.

== Investigation ==
The investigation concluded that the crash was caused by pilot error. The National Transportation Safety Committee (NTSC) stated that Captain Panggabean had deviated the aircraft from its initial route and had not corrected to its initial flightpath. Their original flightpath was on heading 261, but the black box recorded that the crew were flying towards heading 240. As they were already descending, added with winds reaching speed of 25 - 40 knots in the area, their airspeed increased rapidly. This eventually caused them to reach the mountains much earlier than expected.

== Aftermath ==
The crash was infamous for being the first fatal crash of a passenger flight operated by CN235. The aircraft had been presented by the Suharto regime as one of the biggest achievements of the Indonesian aviation industry for being one of the first aircraft to have ever been produced by Indonesia. The crash sparked concerns about the safety of the aircraft.

A monument was erected by Merpati Nusantara Airlines in Cipaganti to commemorate the victims of the crash. The main road leading to Cipaganti was also renamed as Merpati in respect to the crash.

== See also ==
- Air China Flight 129
- Asiana Airlines Flight 214
- List of accidents and incidents involving airliners by airline
