= Trigana Air =

Indonesian airline

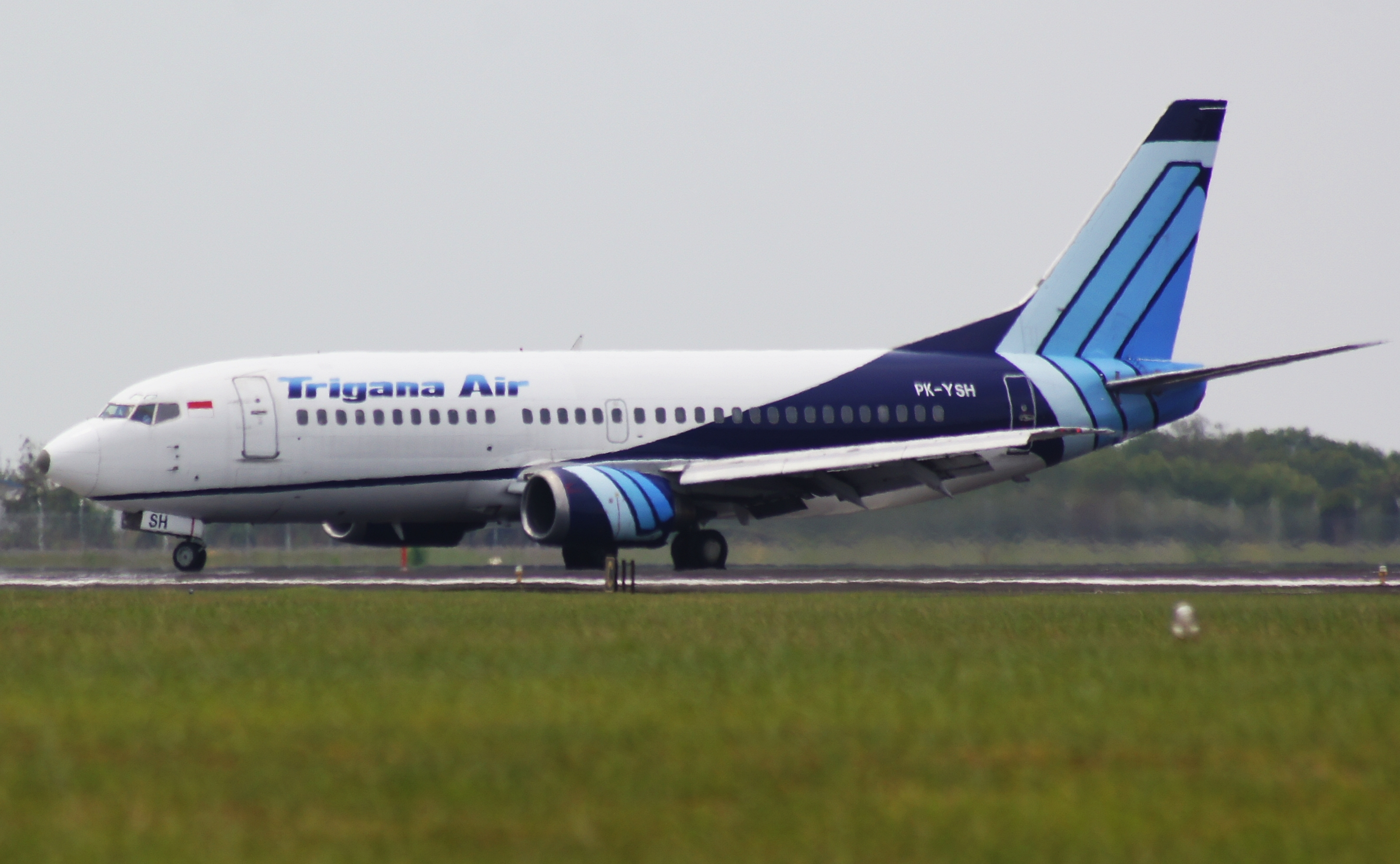
- Trigana Air Boeing 737-300 PK-YSH (Freighter version)
IATA	ICAO	Call sign
IL	TGN	TRIGANA
- Founded: 15 March 1991; 35 years ago
- Operating bases: Soekarno–Hatta International Airport
- Fleet size: 16
- Destinations: 20
- Headquarters: Jakarta, Indonesia
- Key people: Capt. Rubijanto Adisarwono (President Director)
- Website: www.trigana-air.com

Trigana Air (registered as Trigana Air Service) is an airline based in Jakarta, Indonesia.

== History ==
The company commenced operations in early 1991 with two Beechcraft King Air 200 fixed-wing aircraft, and by the end of that year had added two licence-built Bell 412SP helicopters.

Although the airline itself never flew to the European Union, the region imposed a ban on all Indonesian airlines from flying into its airspace in 2007 following the crash of Garuda Indonesia Flight 200, a category that included Trigana Air. The ban was lifted in 2018.

In March 2021, the company announced a partnership with J&T Express. It was also said that J&T Express would use some of the airplanes owned by Trigana Air for its operations.

== Destinations ==
Trigana Air flies to 20 destinations throughout Indonesia, with a particular focus on Western New Guinea.

- Ambon – Pattimura Airport
- Biak – Frans Kaisiepo Airport
- Bula – Kufar Airport
- Dekai – Nop Goliat Dekai Airport
- Jakarta – Soekarno–Hatta International Airport, base
- Jakarta – Halim Perdanakusuma International Airport
- Jayapura – Sentani International Airport
- Merauke – Mopah Airport
- Moa – Jos Orno Imsula Airport
- Nabire – Douw Aturure Airport
- Namrole – Namrole Airport
- Oksibil – Oksibil Airport
- Pangkalan Bun – Iskandar Airport
- Semarang – Jenderal Ahmad Yani International Airport
- Serui – Stevanus Rumbewas Airport
- Sanana – Emalamo Airport
- Surabaya – Juanda International Airport
- Tanah Merah – Tanah Merah Airport
- Ternate – Sultan Babullah Airport
- Wamena – Wamena Airport

== Fleet ==
=== Current fleet ===
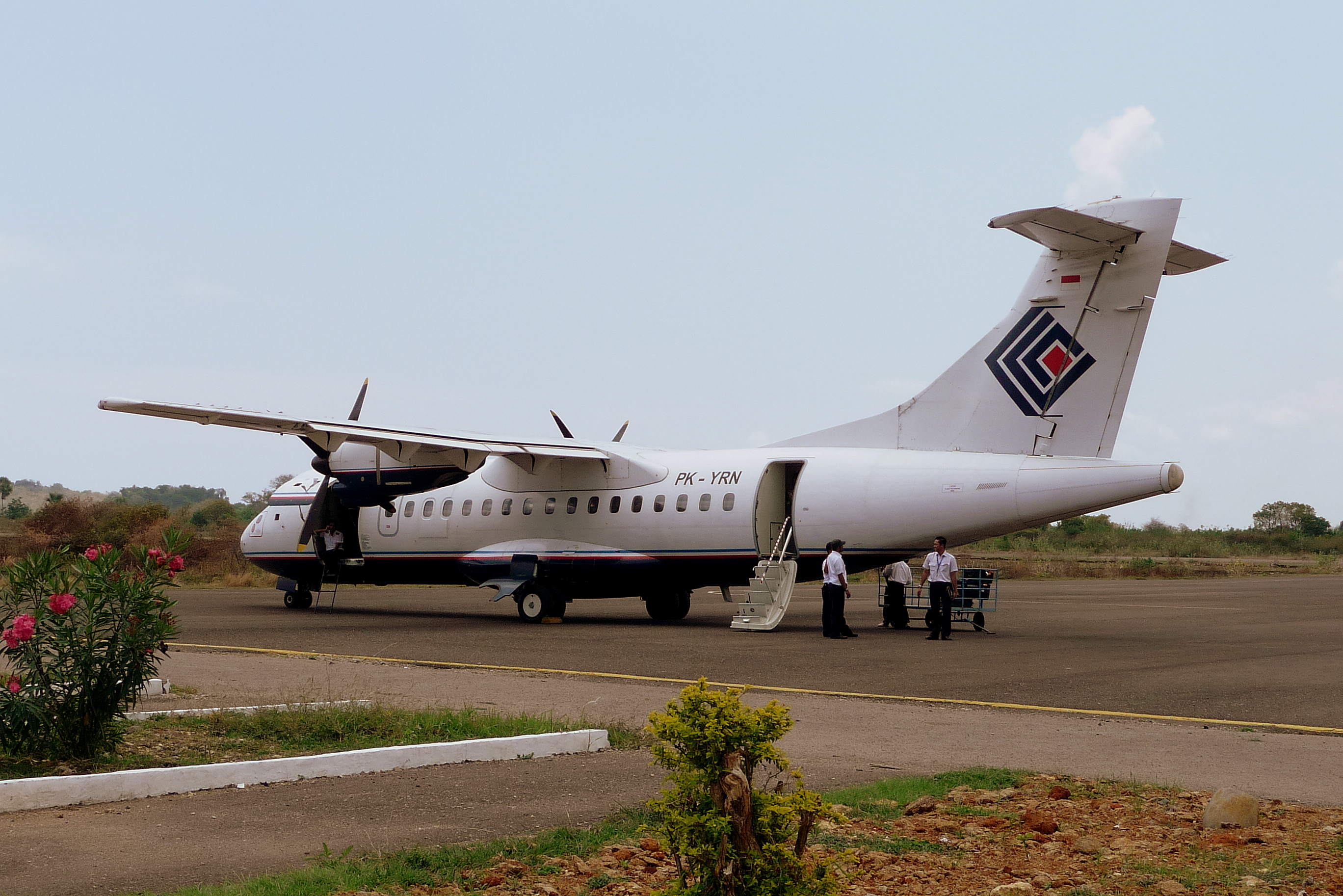
A Trigana Air ATR 42 at Labuan Bajo Airport, Indonesia, in 2008. This aircraft crashed in Papua in 2015.

As of July 2026, Trigana Air operates the following aircraft:

Trigana Air fleet
Aircraft	Total
ATR 42-300	4
ATR 42-500	1
ATR 72-500	2
Boeing 737-300	3
Boeing 737-300SF	5
Boeing 737-500	1
Total	16

== Accidents and incidents ==
Aircraft operated by Trigana Air have been involved in 14 serious incidents, 10 of which resulted in hull loss.

- On 21 April 2002, a Trigana Air Antonov An-72, registered as ES-NOP, was carrying out a chartered cargo service from Sentani Airport, Jayapura to Wamena Airport. The plane was carrying four people: a Lithuanian pilot, Estonian co-pilot, Russian flight engineer, and a loadmaster (nationality undetermined). While landing in Wamena, the front compartment of the Antonov An-72 suddenly caught fire. All aboard were evacuated safely from the plane.
- On 25 May 2002, a de Havilland Canada DHC-6 Twin Otter registered PK-YPZ crashed in heavy rain whilst carrying supplies for the local town. All four passengers and both crew members died.
- On 11 February 2010, Trigana Air Flight 162, operated by an ATR 42-300 registered PK-YRP, force landed in a paddy field near Balikpapan after both engines failed in-flight. All 52 passengers and crew on board survived.
- On 8 April 2012, a DHC-6 Twin Otter carrying eight passengers and crew had several shots fired at it whilst landing at Mulia Airport in Papua province on a flight from Nabire. Both pilots received injuries which led them to lose control of the aircraft, which veered into an airport building. Of the eight passengers and crew aboard, one was killed and four were injured.
- On 16 August 2015, Trigana Air Flight 267, operated by an ATR 42-300 registered PK-YRN, lost contact just before 3pm local time after taking off from Sentani airport in Papua's capital Jayapura on a flight to Oksibil. Its wreckage was found by villagers in the Bintang highlands region of Oksibil. All 49 passengers and five crew members were killed in the accident. The NTSC released their report 2 years and 5 months after the crash, and stated that pilot error and the failure of the ground proximity warning system were the causes.
- On 13 September 2016, Trigana Air Flight 7321, registration PK-YSY operated by a Boeing 737-300, operating a flight from Sentani Airport in Jayapura, made a hard landing on runway 15 at Wamena Airport, breaking both main gears. The aircraft slid to a stop on the runway, coming to rest partially on the grass. Nobody was hurt.
- On 20 March 2021 a Boeing 737-400, registration PK-YSF, had a landing gear issue while departing from Halim Perdanakusuma International Airport. When attempting to make an emergency landing, the landing gear collapsed, causing significant damage, and the plane skidded off the runway.
- On 9 September 2024, an ATR 42-500 registered PK-YSP operating Trigana Air Flight 292 suffered a runway excursion after an aborted take-off at Stevanus Rumbewas Airport in Serui. All 48 occupants survived.
- On 5 November 2024, a Boeing 737-500 registered PK-YSC operating as Trigana Air Flight IL-237 had an uncommanded evacuation after it suffered a tailpipe fire during pushback at Sentani Airport in Jayapura. All 129 occupants survived, with 4 passengers having to be rushed to a nearby hospital for injuries during evacuation.

== Safety ==
On January 3, 2018, Airline Ratings awarded Trigana Air the dubious honor as one of the worst in the world in regards to safety, with a one-star rating out of seven. The other airlines rated worst were North Korea's Air Koryo, Suriname's Blue Wing Airlines and Nepal's Buddha Air, Nepal Airlines, Tara Air and Yeti Airlines.
