= Trigana Air Flight 267 =

2015 aviation accident in Indonesia

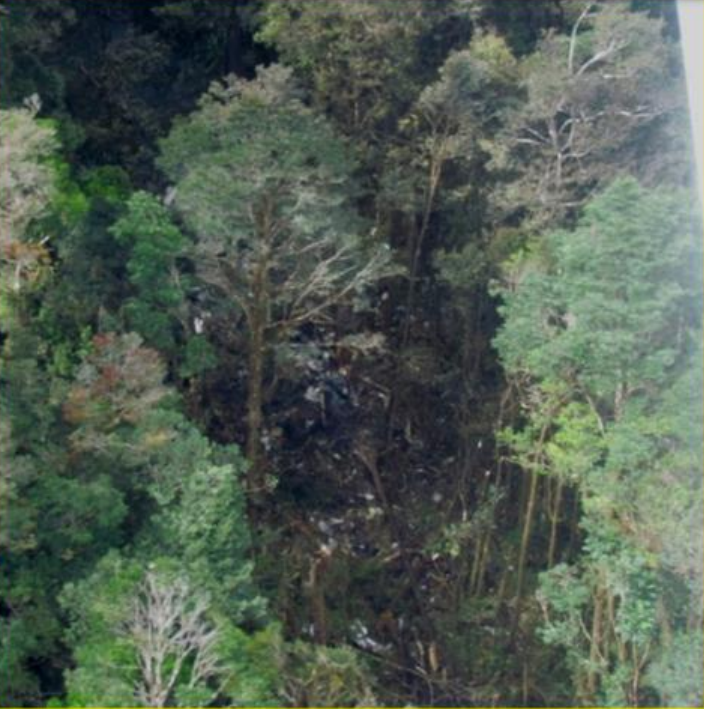
- Aerial view of the crash site

Accident
- Date: 16 August 2015
- Summary: Controlled flight into terrain due to pilot error
- Site: Mount Tangok, Bintang Mountains, Highland Papua, Indonesia; 04°49′28″S 140°29′53″E

Aircraft
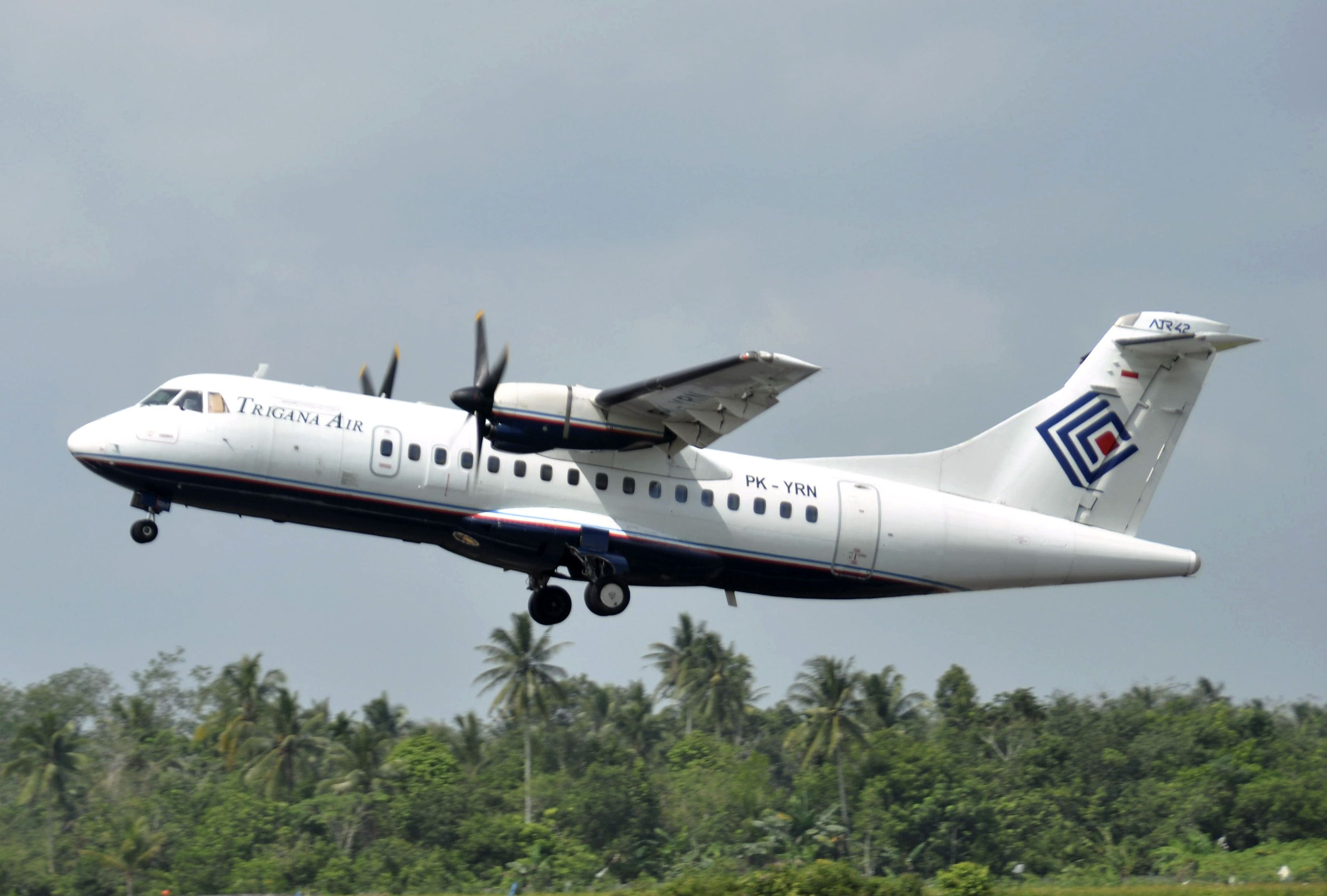
- PK-YRN, the aircraft involved in the accident, seen in 2010
- Aircraft type: ATR 42-300
- Operator: Trigana Air
- IATA flight No.: IL267
- ICAO flight No.: TGN267
- Call sign: TRIGANA 267
- Registration: PK-YRN
- Flight origin: Sentani Airport, Jayapura, Indonesia
- Destination: Oksibil Airport, Oksibil, Indonesia
- Occupants: 54
- Passengers: 49
- Crew: 5
- Fatalities: 54
- Survivors: 0

Trigana Air Flight 267 was a scheduled passenger flight from Sentani to Oksibil in the eastern Indonesian province of Papua. On 16 August 2015, the ATR 42 turboprop operating the service crashed on approach in the Bintang highlands region of Oksibil, killing all 49 passengers and 5 crew members.

With 54 deaths, it is the deadliest accident involving the ATR 42, and the airline's deadliest accident since its establishment in 1991.

The Indonesian National Transportation Safety Committee published its final report into the accident in December 2017. Deviation from visual approach guidance and visual flight rules without regard to weather and terrain, and the likely deactivation of the EGPWS system contributed directly to the crash, compounded by shortcomings in Trigana Air's safety culture.

== Background ==
=== Aircraft ===
The aircraft involved was an ATR 42-300 registered as PK-YRN, with serial number 102 and powered by two Pratt & Whitney Canada PW120 engines manufactured in 1988. Trigana Air acquired the aircraft in 2005. Aircraft operated by Trigana Air were involved in fourteen accidents between 1992 and 2016, eleven of which resulted in hull losses.

=== Passengers and crew ===
The aircraft was carrying 49 passengers and 5 crew members. The passenger manifest released by Trigana Air indicated all on board were Indonesian. There were 44 adults, 3 children and 2 infants among the passengers. There were two pilots; Captain Hasanuddin (Note: "Hasanuddin" is a mononym (one word name), which is common for Indonesian names.) (aged 60) had joined Trigana in 2000, he had 25,200 hours of total flying experience and 7,300 hours' experience flying ATR 42s. First Officer Ariadin Falani (aged 44) had joined Trigana in 2008 and had a total of 3,800 hours flying experience, of which 2,600 were in flying ATR 42s.

Among the passengers were four postal servicemen heading to Oksibil to distribute the Indonesia Sejahtera card, a programme for the poor that President Joko Widodo developed and promoted while campaigning for the 2014 Indonesia Presidential Election. They were reportedly carrying around 6.5 billion rupiah ($US470,000). Three local government officials and two members of the Regional Representatives Council were also on board to attend celebrations in Oksibil for the 70th anniversary of Indonesia's independence.

== Accident ==
=== Flight ===
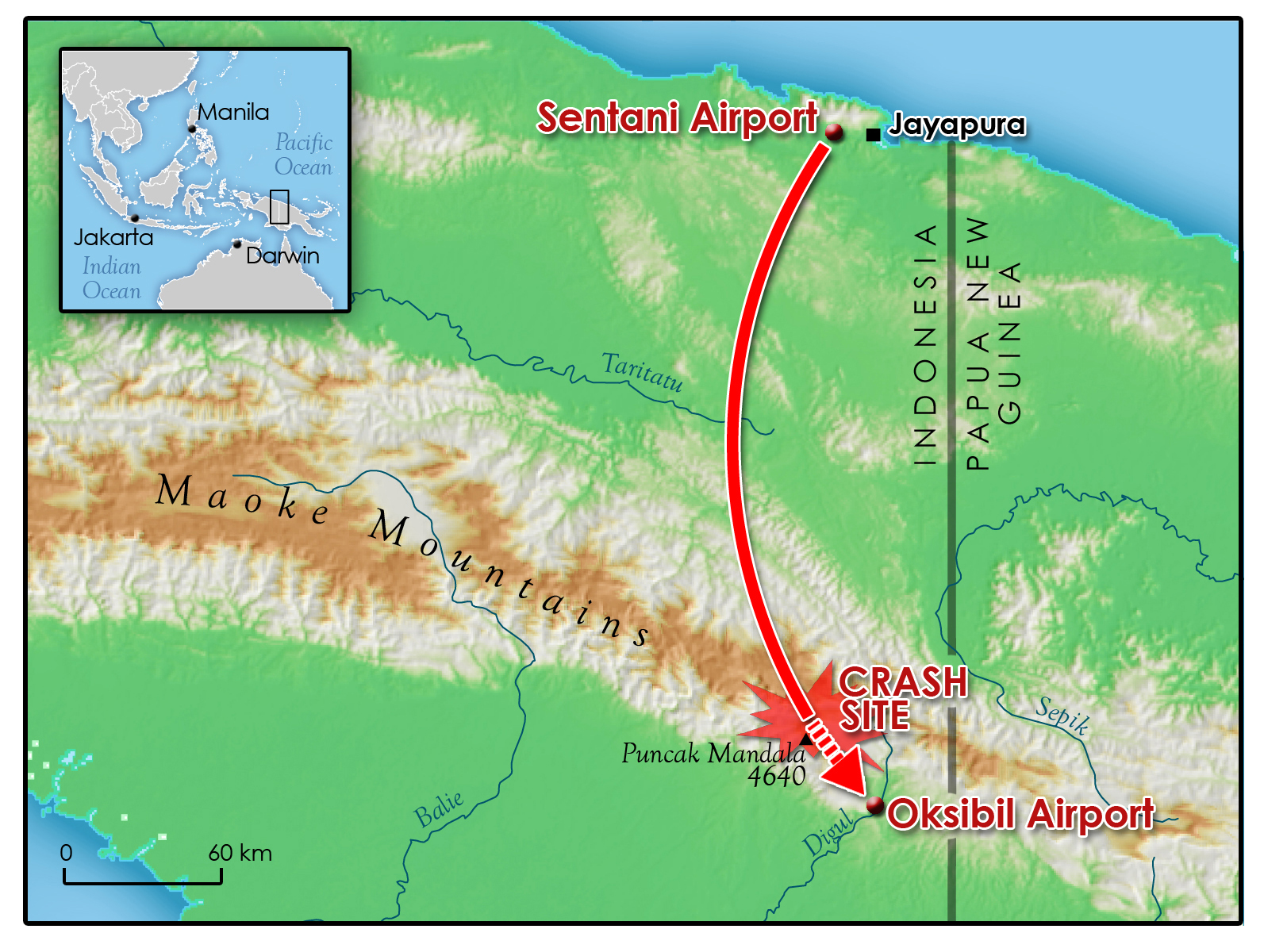
Map showing the crash site in Papua

The Trigana Air flight took off from Sentani Airport in Jayapura at 14:22 WIT (UTC+9, 05:22 UTC) and was expected to land in Oksibil at about 15:04. Oksibil is a remote town near the country's border with Papua New Guinea. Oksibil Airport did not have an instrument landing system to guide aircraft in to land because it is located close to a mountain.

Contact was lost with the aircraft at about 14:55. No distress call was made by the crew. The crew had been expected to make contact with ground staff at Oksibil Airport at around 15:00; attempts by those at the airport to contact the aircraft were unsuccessful. At the time of the accident, the aircraft was on the final section of its scheduled route.

=== Weather conditions ===
Conflicting statements regarding the weather conditions were released. Stormy weather was initially cited as a possible cause of the crash; however, it was later confirmed that the weather was good. Minister of Transportation Ignasius Jonan stated that bad weather was not the cause of the crash. Data from the local Indonesian Agency for Meteorology, Climatology and Geophysics office showed that the weather at the time of the crash was sunny. The crew of another aircraft landing prior to the crash also reported conditions at the time as "good". The Ministry of Transportation acknowledged that Indonesia's air navigation system equipment was very old, dating back to the 1950s, especially in remote areas such as Papua. Most airports in Papua did not have modern navigation aids at the time. Without this equipment, the airports and flight crew must rely on visual flight rules.

=== Search ===
At 15:30, Indonesia's National Search and Rescue Agency (BASARNAS) deployed a search aircraft to find the missing ATR 42. The search was suspended due to foggy weather and was resumed, with several additional search aircraft augmented by a search team on foot, on 17 August. Local residents contacted police and reported that they saw the aircraft crash into the Tangok Mountain in the Okbape district of Pegunungan Bintang Regency. Airborne searchers spotted the wreckage about 12 km (7 miles; 6 nautical miles) from Oksibil. The Indonesia Transportation Ministry confirmed that the wreckage was located at an elevation of 8,300 feet (2,530 m). All 54 passengers and crew were found to have died. The terrain itself had never been previously explored by humans, according to BASARNAS officials.

=== Recovery ===
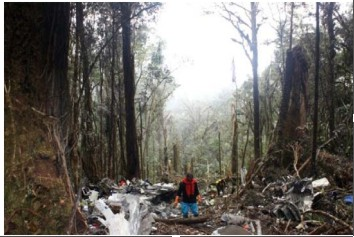
The crash site

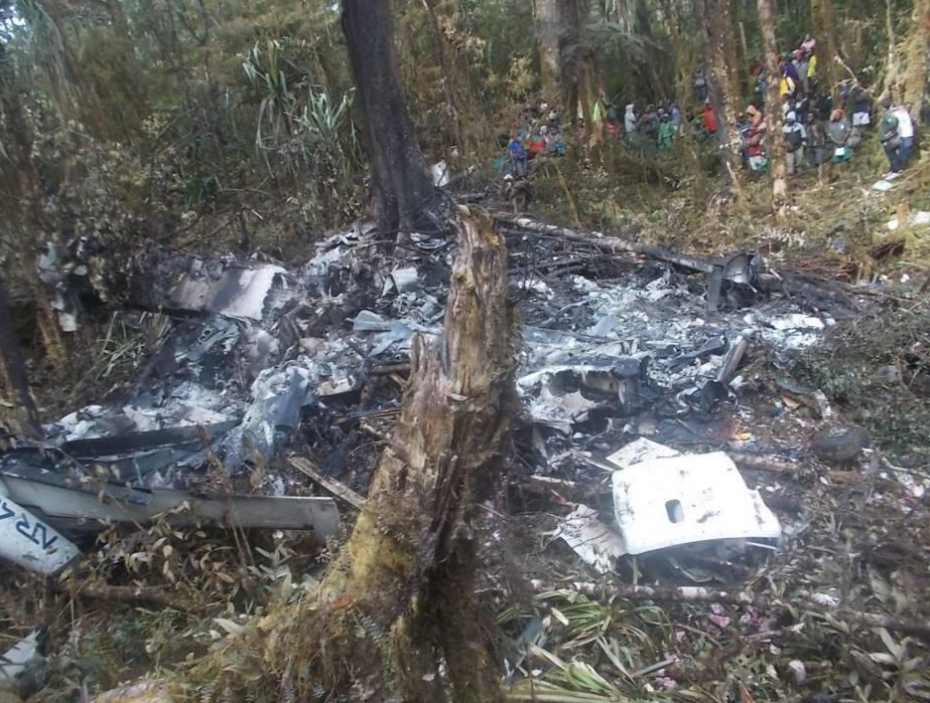
Another angle of the crash site

BASARNAS sent 250 personnel to Oksibil in response to the crash. Due to the thin air at this high altitude rescuers were unable to use air transport to recover victims or wreckage, necessitating an overland recovery. The terrain itself was described as "very steep" and it took around three days to reach the wreckage on foot, or six hours by vehicle. Indonesian National Police sent three Disaster Victim Identification (DVI) teams into the area to identify the victims of the crash. The bodies were transported to a military hospital in Jayapura. However, bad weather and low visibility hampered the search and rescue effort. Weather systems around the wreckage were "unpredictable", according to BASARNAS. The identification of the victims used DNA, tooth samples and forensic DNA analysis from surviving family members. The families sent post-mortem and ante-mortem data to the police.

By 18 August 2015, all of the dead had been found, but bad weather prevented the recovery of victims' bodies. Some victims' bodies were intact and exhibited burn injuries, others were mutilated and difficult to identify. Photos taken from the crash site reveal that the aircraft had been heavily fragmented into smaller pieces by the force of the impact with no chance of survival. By nightfall on 19 August, 17 bodies had been carried out from the crash site. The flight data recorder was eventually found on 20 August and shown to the media.

== Investigation ==
The Indonesian National Transportation Safety Committee (NTSC or KNKT) opened an investigation to the crash. In line with international regulations, as the aircraft was built in France, its Bureau d'Enquêtes et d'Analyses pour la Sécurité de l'Aviation Civile (BEA) participated, sending three investigators. Aircraft manufacturer ATR also assisted and sent four technical advisers.

The flight manifest released by Trigana was found to be wrong, being for another Trigana flight. As a result, the chairman of Sentani Airport was fired by the Transportation Ministry. Sixteen workers were also investigated by the police because of their involvement. Two of Trigana's staff remained in custody. Ignasius Jonan, Indonesian Minister of Transportation, criticized the airport staff saying the situation was a "big mess" and needed to be cleaned up.

The flight data recorder (FDR) had a history of maintenance problems going back more than a year, and was inoperative at the time of the accident. Instead, investigators rebuilt the predicted flight path of Flight 267 using Google Earth and data from the cockpit voice recorder (CVR) and its spectrum analysis. The analysis of the CVR revealed that at 14:55 local time, the flight crew of Flight 267 stated their intention to make a direct left base. Immediately after that, Flight 267 deviated from the standard approach path.

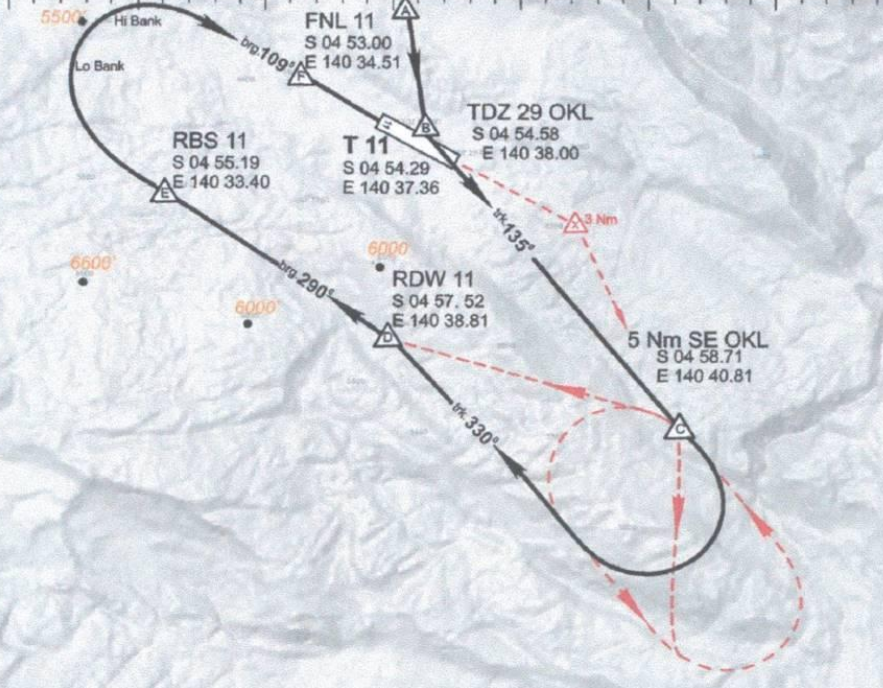
The flight path the pilots of Flight 267 should have taken

Flight 267 deviated to the right. The area on the right side of Flight 267 was surrounded by mountainous terrain. Some of the terrain was as high as 8,000 feet (2,400 m). In addition, Papua's unpredictable weather would endanger the flight easily. Pilots had reported that fog sometimes "came out of nowhere", which could limit the pilot's visibility. Though good weather conditions were reported in the area, localized fog existed in the mountains. According to the NTSC, based on the CVR analysis, Flight 267 descended while in the clouds, while the mountains were covered in fog. As the aircraft was flying too low to pass through the mountain range, the NTSC concluded that it was plausible that the aircraft's proximity to terrain was not noticed by the flight crew.

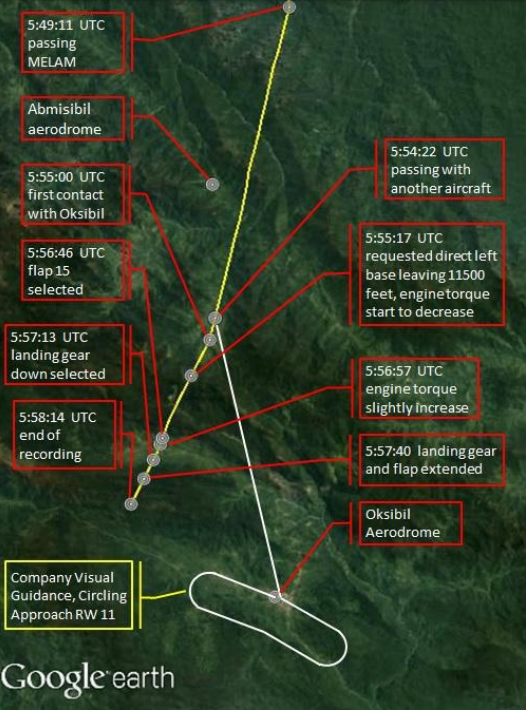
The planned flight path (white line) and the path the pilots took (yellow line)

The investigation team analyzed the crew's motivation to deviate from the standard approach and observed that, on the crew's previous flight from Sentani to Oksibil earlier the same day, they did exactly the same thing: joining directly on left base.

The NTSC noted that the EGPWS did not sound during the flight's final moments, even though Flight 267 was going to hit the mountain. Investigators discovered that the circuit breaker responsible for the activation of the EGPWS had intentionally been pulled by Flight 267's crew. Trigana Air's management stated that some pilots claimed the warnings sometimes sounded improperly, which led them to believe that the EGPWS had malfunctioned. Thus, the EGPWS was de-activated by pulling the circuit breaker. The management had identified that some pilots including the accident pilot were pulling the EGPWS's circuit breaker.

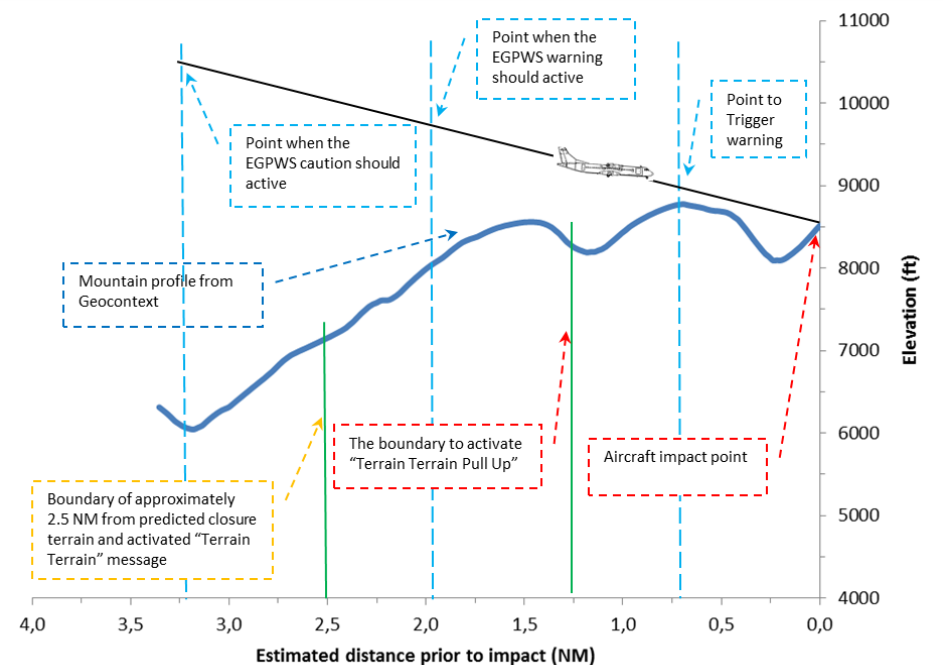
The flight path of Flight 267 with labelled information

As per the final report, the investigation concluded that the EGPWS power supply circuit breaker was pulled during the accident flight and the two previous flights, explaining the absence of the altitude call out during the two previous approaches and warning prior to the impact. Further investigation revealed that Trigana Air's published approach chart which it provided the pilot had incorrect information. The approach chart stated that the minimum safe altitude was at 8,000 ft. Flight 267 impacted the mountain at 8,300 feet (2,500 m). The NTSC concluded that the approach chart was wrong, ineffective and hard to understand. Aircraft maintenance was also badly performed by the airline.

The final report concluded that the accident resulted from a controlled flight into terrain caused by the crew's decision to deviate from its projected flight path. The absence of EGPWS warnings aggravated the condition.

== Aftermath ==
=== Mourning ===
The aircraft crashed one day before Indonesia celebrated its 70th anniversary; Indonesian President Joko Widodo urged all Indonesians to pray, and held a minute of silence in order to remember the victims. Crisis centres were set up in Sentani and Jakarta. BASARNAS also set up three crisis centres in Jayapura. Minister of Transportation Ignasius Jonan commented that Trigana Air "must treat the affected families as well as possible". Shortly after the crash, flowers and condolence banners were displayed in front of Trigana Air's head office. The condolences came from various airlines, including Sriwijaya Air, Aviastar and head staff of INACA.

Trigana Air stated it would pay compensation as it claimed responsibility for the crash, with a total of Rp.1,25 billion in compensation for each person killed in the crash. Jasa Raharja, an insurance firm, was to also pay compensation of Rp. 100 million for each person, bringing the total to Rp. 1,35 billion.

=== Infrastructure ===
Indonesia's People's Representative Council urged the government to upgrade the air navigation system at every airport in Indonesia. The Indonesian government stated that it would work with AirNav Indonesia to upgrade the infrastructure in Papua. There were twelve small airports slated for upgrade by the government. Among them were Sumenep Airport, Labuan Bajo Airport and Oksibil Airport. The first phase is the upgrade of the information system transferring data from Aeronautical Flight Information Services (AFIS) to Area Aerodrome Control (ADC) towers. Updated weather reports would also be issued by the local weather station more frequently. The safety procedures upgrade process was to take around six months, and the ADC towers upgrade about a year. Some runways at the airports were also to be upgraded.

Andrew Herdman, head of the Association of Asia Pacific Airlines said:

More resources are needed but of course governments face many demands on their resources. Further investment is needed in infrastructure. Many of the airports in Indonesia are dealing with congestion well beyond their design capacity. Some of the smaller airports, and this most recent tragedy involved short haul service between two remote airports in inhospitable terrain in Papua -- airports in that terrain need upgrading of navigation aids and other operational enhancements.

=== Regulatory ===
The crash brought the spotlight back on Indonesian aviation safety. Arnold Barnet, a statistician focusing on aviation safety at the Massachusetts Institute of Technology, told the New York Times in December 2014 that the death rate in Indonesian airline crashes over the previous ten years was one in every million passenger-boardings, compared to one death for every 25 million passengers for airlines in the United States. According to CNN, International Air Transport Association (IATA) CEO Tony Tyler said in March 2015 that Indonesia had seen at least one major crash resulting in the loss of an aircraft every year since 2010; and that Indonesia was rated "below the global average" by the Universal Safety Oversight Audit Program (USOAP) of the International Civil Aviation Organization (ICAO). Aviation expert Mary Schiavo opined that Trigana's prior crashes suggest that better training of its pilots was needed, as controlled flight into terrain was a factor in most of the airline's fatal aircraft crashes.

== In popular culture ==
The accident is featured in the eighth episode of Season 20 of Mayday, also known as Air Crash Investigation. The episode is titled "No Warning".

== See also ==
- List of aircraft accidents and incidents resulting in at least 50 fatalities
- List of unrecovered and unusable flight recorders
