= Merpati Nusantara Airlines Flight 106 =

1997 aviation accident in Indonesia

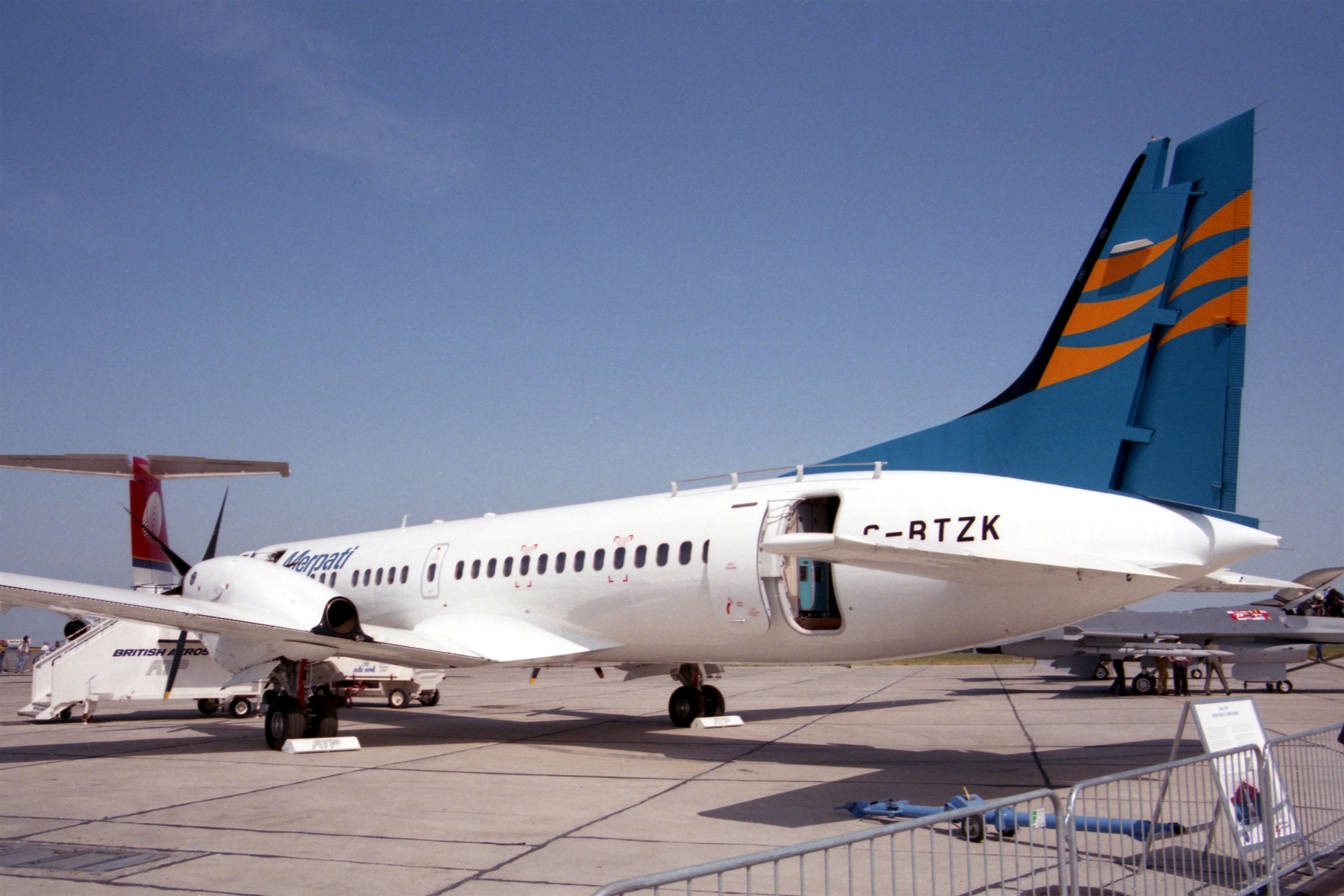
- An ATP similar to the accident aircraft

Accident
- Date: 19 April 1997
- Summary: Loss of control
- Site: Buluh Tumbang Airport, Indonesia; 2.7456°S 107.7550°E

Aircraft
- Aircraft type: British Aerospace ATP
- Aircraft name: Sangeang
- Operator: Merpati Nusantara Airlines
- IATA flight No.: MZ106
- ICAO flight No.: MNA106
- Call sign: MERPATI 106
- Registration: PK-MTX
- Flight origin: Soekarno Hatta International Airport, Jakarta
- Destination: Buluh Tumbang Airport, Tanjung Pandan
- Occupants: 53
- Passengers: 48
- Crew: 5
- Fatalities: 15
- Survivors: 38

On 19 April 1997, Merpati Nusantara Airlines Flight 106, a British Aerospace ATP operating a regularly scheduled domestic passenger flight from Soekarno Hatta International Airport to Buluh Tumbang Airport, (Note: Now known as H.A.S. Hanandjoeddin International Airport.) Indonesia, crashed into a coconut plantation whilst on approach to the airport, killing 15 of the 53 passengers and crew on board the aircraft.

== Background ==
=== Aircraft ===
The aircraft involved, manufactured in 1992, was a British Aerospace ATP registered as PK-MTX with serial number 2048. It had its first flight in 1992 and was powered by two Pratt & Whitney Canada PW126 engines. The aircraft was owned by Merpati Nusantara Airlines, a state-run airline.

=== Passengers and crew ===
There were 53 occupants on board the aircraft: 48 passengers – including 44 adults, two children, and two babies – and five crew members.

The five crew members included 28-year-old Captain Bartholomeus Suwardi, 21-year-old first officer Imamtuhu Ahmad Faisal Soesmono, a mechanic, a 21-year-old flight attendant, (Note: Berita Yudha names the flight attendant as Kramatiningsing while Kompas names the flight attendant as Kramataningsih.) and another flight attendant.

== Accident ==
The flight took off from Soekarno Hatta International Airport at 06:40 WIB (UTC+07:00) en route to Buluh Tumbang Airport with an estimated arrival time of 07:50. At 07:35, at an altitude of 2,000 feet (610 m), the captain asked air traffic control for permission to land, to which they instructed the flight to land on runway 36. At 07:39, the aircraft crashed into a coconut plantation in Bulutumbang village, 6 kilometres (3.7 mi) short of the runway. According to residents, the plane crashed nose-first into terrain. The plane broke into two sections with fire igniting in the front part of the aircraft.
