= Stevanus Rumbewas Airport =

Stevanus Rumbewas Airport Bandar Udara Stevanus Rumbewas
- IATA: ZRI; ICAO: WABO

Summary
- Airport type: Public
- Owner: Ministry of Transportation
- Operator: UPT Ditjen Hubud
- Serves: Serui
- Location: Yapen Islands Regency, Papua, Indonesia
- Time zone: WITA (UTC+09:00)
- Elevation AMSL: 6 m / 20 ft
- Coordinates: 01°49′43.7″S 136°03′50.9″E

Map
- Location in Papua Location in Western New Guinea Location in Indonesia

Runways
Direction	Length		Surface
Direction	m	ft	Surface
10/28	1,600	5,249	Asphalt

Stevanus Rumbewas Airport (IATA: ZRI, ICAO: WABO) (Indonesian: Bandar Udara Stevanus Rumbewas) is an airport serving the town of Serui and the nearby towns and islands in the Yapen Islands Regency, Papua, Indonesia. The airport commenced operation on 19 December 2014, replacing the old Sudjarwo Tjondronegoro Airport which has been closed due to the lack of land for expansion to cope with the increasing passenger demands. The airport is named after Stevanus Rumbewas, a former Indonesian Navy officer who originated from Serui, and member of Indonesian Irian Independence Party (PKII).

== Facility ==
The airport resides at an elevation of 6 metres (20 ft) above mean sea level. It has one runway designated 10/28 with an asphalt surface measuring 1,600 m x 30 m (5,249 ft × 98 ft). Furthermore, the airport has an apron with a size of 120 m x 55 m (39 ft × 180 ft) which can accommodate a maximum of 1 ATR 42 aircraft and 1 DHC-6 Twin Otter type aircraft. In addition, it has a terminal building covering an area of 600 square meters.

== Airlines and destinations ==
Airlines	Destinations
Trigana Air Service	Biak, Jayapura
