= Tanjungpandan =

- Town

Other transcription(s)
  - Chinese: 丹絨香蘭
  - Jawi: تنجوڠ ڤندن
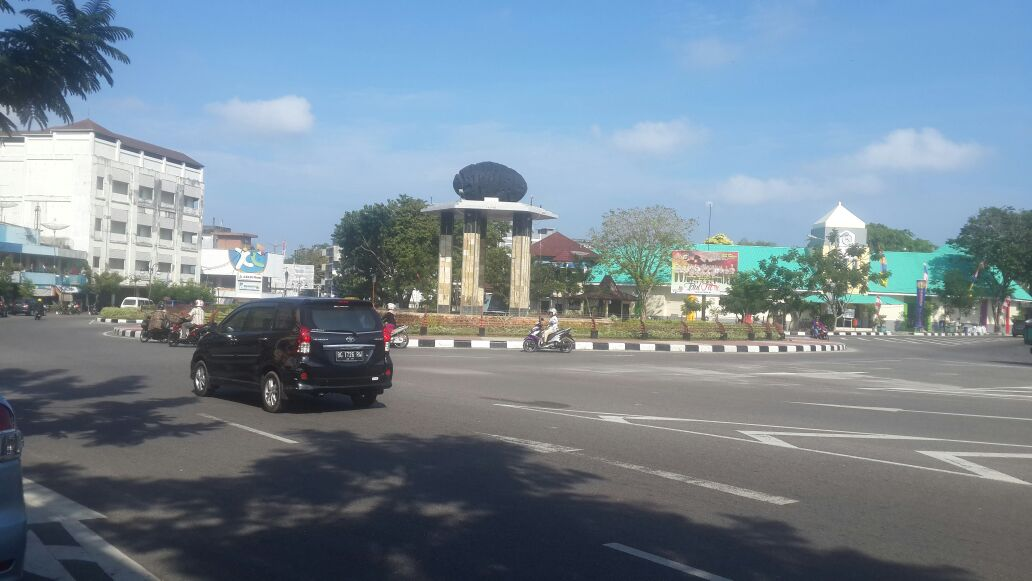
- Downtown Tanjung Pandan
- Motto: Tanjung Pandan Kota Bertuah
- Location within Indonesia Location within Sumatra
- Coordinates: 2°45′S 107°45′E
- Country: Indonesia
- Province: Bangka Belitung Islands
- Regency: Belitung
- Founded: 1 July 1838

Government

Area
  - Total: 378.45 km^{2} (146.12 sq mi)

Population (2020 Census)
  - Total: 103,062
  - Density: 272.33/km^{2} (705.32/sq mi)
- Time zone: UTC+7 (WIB)
- Kode Pos: 33451; 33411

Tanjungpandan (Note: The town's name is correctly and officially spelled as Tanjungpandan.) (Indonesian pronunciation: [t̪and͡ʒʊŋˈpandan]), also colloquially written as Tanjung Pandan, is the largest town on the island of Belitung in the Indonesian province of Bangka Belitung Islands. Tanjungpandan is the capital of the Belitung Regency comprising one of the five districts (kecamatan) within that Regency. It covers an area of 378.45 km^{2} and had a population of 86,487 at the 2010 Census and 103,062 at the 2020 Census.

== Demographics ==
The majority of the people in Tanjungpandan are the Belitung Malays and the Hakka Chinese. The religion of the Malays is predominantly Muslims, while the Chinese are mainly Buddhist, Confucianist, Catholic, or Protestant. In 2020, the town of Tanjungpandan registered the highest population density rate of 272 individuals per square kilometer across the entire Belitung regency.

== Climate ==
Climate data for Tanjungpandan (H.A.S. Hanandjoeddin International Airport) (1991–2020 normals)
Month	Jan	Feb	Mar	Apr	May	Jun	Jul	Aug	Sep	Oct	Nov	Dec	Year
Mean daily maximum °C (°F)	29.8 (85.6)	30.3 (86.5)	30.9 (87.6)	31.3 (88.3)	31.8 (89.2)	31.7 (89.1)	31.6 (88.9)	32.2 (90.0)	32.6 (90.7)	31.9 (89.4)	30.8 (87.4)	29.8 (85.6)	31.2 (88.2)
Daily mean °C (°F)	26.1 (79.0)	26.2 (79.2)	26.3 (79.3)	26.2 (79.2)	26.6 (79.9)	26.6 (79.9)	26.4 (79.5)	26.7 (80.1)	26.8 (80.2)	26.4 (79.5)	25.9 (78.6)	26.0 (78.8)	26.4 (79.5)
Mean daily minimum °C (°F)	23.5 (74.3)	23.5 (74.3)	23.4 (74.1)	23.3 (73.9)	23.5 (74.3)	23.3 (73.9)	22.8 (73.0)	22.7 (72.9)	22.7 (72.9)	22.8 (73.0)	23.1 (73.6)	23.4 (74.1)	23.2 (73.8)
Average precipitation mm (inches)	303.6 (11.95)	183.9 (7.24)	250.5 (9.86)	351.2 (13.83)	307.1 (12.09)	199.6 (7.86)	147.4 (5.80)	105.7 (4.16)	129.0 (5.08)	311.9 (12.28)	402.1 (15.83)	458.6 (18.06)	3,150.6 (124.04)
Average precipitation days (≥ 1.0 mm)	17.4	11.8	15.6	20.2	17.1	12.9	10.0	8.2	8.0	17.3	22.2	23.6	184.3
Source: World Meteorological Organization

== Transportation ==
Tanjungpandan has H.A.S. Hanandjoeddin International Airport which serves links to Jakarta, Pangkalpinang and Palembang (via Pangkalpinang).

Tanjungpandan is home to the Tanjungpandan Port, which serves the island of Belitung. In 2011, the port authorities established a passenger terminal to promote tourism on the island of Belitung. The terminal was named the Laskar Pelangi Port, after the best-selling novel and movie by Andrea Hirata. The establishment of the terminal was a significant step towards promoting tourism and providing better facilities for visitors to the island.

== Tourism ==
The town is also known for its wide range of tourist attractions that offer natural wonders, cultural experiences, and family-friendly activities. One of the most popular attractions in the town is Tanjung Pendam Beach, which located near the main center of the town. Gusong Bugis is another beach destination that offers various recreational activities and stunning views of the sea. Kulong Keramik is a recreational spot in the Tanjungpandan, featuring a lake or quarry as its main attraction. Initially used by a ceramic company, the area was later neglected until the local government refurbished it in 2010.

In addition to its beaches, the Museum & Zoo Tanjungpandan combines a museum and a zoo. It displays the colonial and pre-colonial history and artifacts of Belitung, a trade location between Malacca and Java, and houses a range of animals native to the area.

== Notes ==
1. The town's name is correctly and officially spelled as Tanjungpandan.
