= Merpati Nusantara Airlines =

Airline of Indonesia (1962–2014)

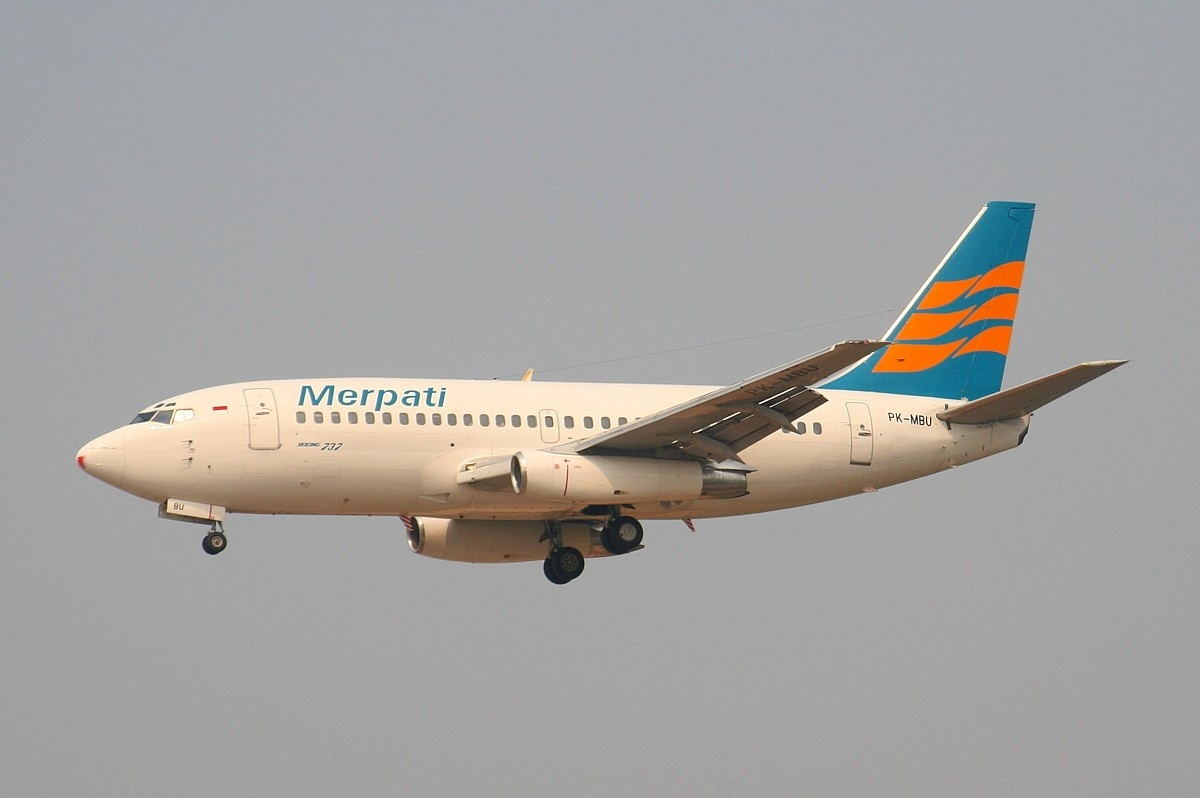
- A Merpati Nusantara Boeing 737-200 in 2006
IATA	ICAO	Call sign
MZ	MNA	MERPATI
- Founded: 6 September 1962 (as Merpati Nusantara Airlines)
- Commenced operations: June 1987 (as Merpati)
- Ceased operations: June 1987 (as Merpati Nusantara Airlines); 1 February 2014 (as Merpati)
- Operating bases: Denpasar; Jakarta–Soekarno-Hatta; Surabaya; Biak
- Frequent-flyer program: Easy Flyer
- Subsidiaries: Merpati Maintenance Facility
- Fleet size: 39
- Destinations: 84
- Parent company: Government of Indonesia
- Headquarters: Jakarta, Indonesia
- Key people: Capt. Asep Ekanugraha (CEO)
- Website: www.merpati.co.id

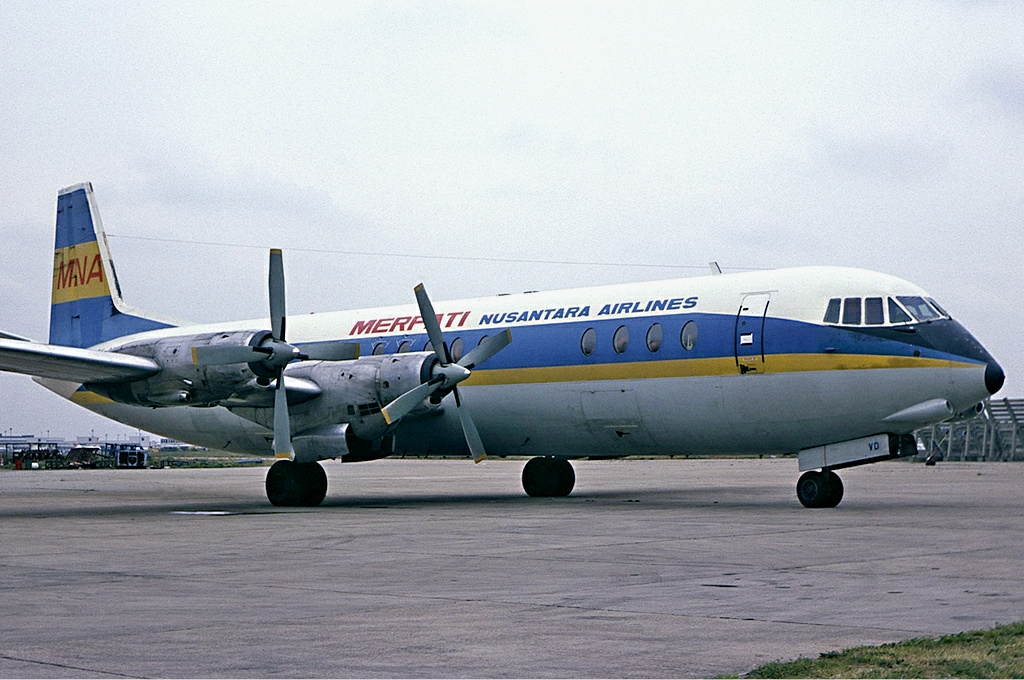
A Merpati Nusantara Vickers Vanguard 953 in 1977

PT Merpati Nusantara Airlines, operated as Merpati, was an airline in Indonesia based in Central Jakarta, Jakarta. It operated scheduled domestic services to more than 25 destinations in Indonesia, as well as scheduled international services to East Timor and Malaysia. The word merpati is Indonesian for "dove", and Nusantara is a Javanese word found in the Pararaton ("the Book of Kings", probably written in the 16th century) meaning "the outer islands", referring to the Indonesian archipelago. The airline was based at Soekarno-Hatta International Airport, Jakarta. It also maintained both a maintenance and simulator facility at Juanda International Airport, Surabaya. The Merpati Training Centre at Surabaya housed Fokker F-27, AVIC MA60 and CN-235 full motion simulators.

All services were suspended in 2014 due to financial and regulatory issues. After 8 years of failing to negotiate the airline's relaunch and obtain funding, all operating licenses and certificates were permanently revoked and the airline was dissolved on 20 February 2023.

== History ==
With a start-up capital of 10 million rupiah in September 1962, Merpati began operations in Kalimantan, using a fleet of four de Havilland Otter/DHC-3s and two Douglas DC-3 Dakotas provided by the Indonesian Air Force (TNI AU). Pilots and technicians were supplied by the Indonesian Air Force, Garuda Indonesia Airways, and other civil aviation companies. Its mission, defined by the government, was to become an 'air bridge' linking remote areas of Indonesia and thereby helping to build the economies of such regional areas. The air bridge theme is the basis of the current Merpati logo, displayed on the tails of its aircraft.

The first Managing Director appointed was Air Commodore Sutoyo Adiputro Henk (1962–1966) who had an initial staff of 17 people. In 1963, the airline expanded its routes to include Jakarta - Tanjung Karang (Bandar Lampung), Jakarta - Semarang, and Jakarta - Balikpapan. In 1964, the airline took over operations from NV de Kroonduif Garuda, increasing its aircraft fleet to 12. With the addition of three DC-3 Dakotas, two DHC-6 Twin Otters and 1 DHC-2 Beaver, Merpati began to grow, with operations now reaching Sumatra, Papua and Nusa Tenggara Barat. Further expansion saw the addition of more aircraft, including three Dornier DO-28s and six Pilatus Porter PC-6s, and staff numbers growing to 583 people.

The airline was jointly owned by the Indonesian Government (93.2%) and Garuda Indonesia (6.8%).

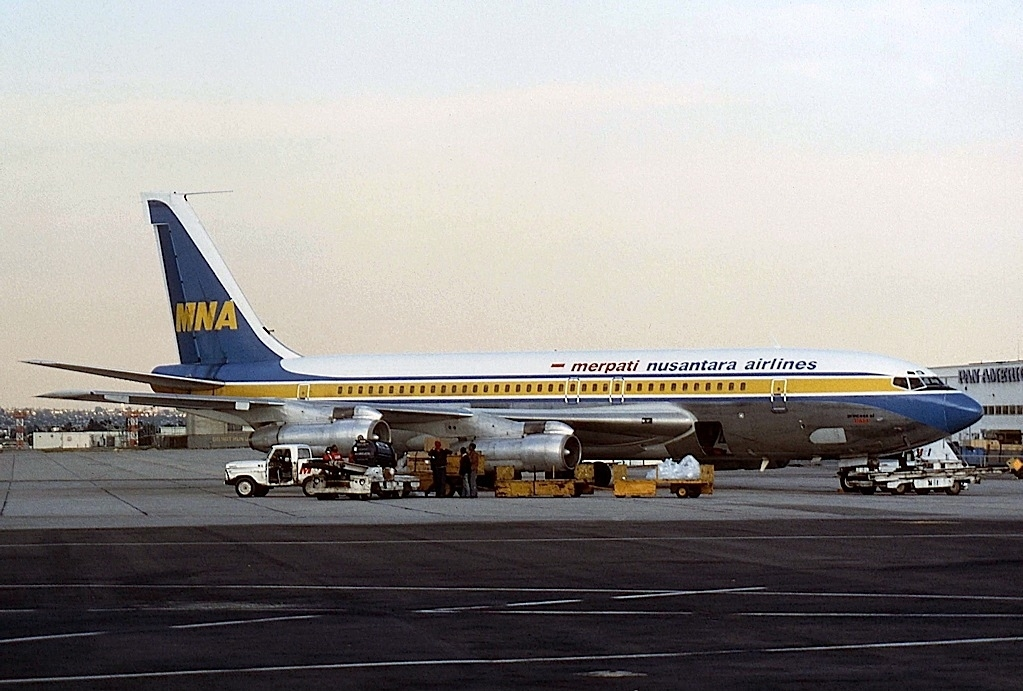
Boeing 707 at Los Angeles 1978

In June 2011, the Merpati commercial director stated that the airline was opening a tender for 15 jet airliners, including 40 aircraft with a capacity of 50 passengers and 20 additional aircraft carrying 20 passengers, such as the MA-60, the NC-212 or DHC-6 Twin Otter. The following month, with the airline suffering from financial difficulties, the government and the legislature agreed to provide a capital injection of Rp.516 billion ($60.7 million) to Merpati Nusantara Airlines in the 2012 state budget.

In February 2014, due to the airline's inability to pay its employees salary or benefits for three consecutive months, many pilots and cabin crew resigned. The same month, Merpati suspended all services due to cashflow problems, including an inability to obtain fuel on credit, obliging the company to pay cash. On 24 July 2014 it was reported that the Indonesian Ministry of Finance had decided not to reopen the company following the airline's accumulating a debt of 7.9 trillion Rupiahs, as well as the failure of a debt-to-equity-swap plan proposed by the company.

In late 2016 the Ministry of State Owned Enterprises stated that the airline might be able to resume commercial flights in 2017 following a restructuring plan and government cash injection.

On 14 November 2018, The Panel of Judges of the Commercial Court decided to approve the peace proposal of PT Merpati Nusantara Airlines with its creditors held at the District Court (PN), Surabaya, East Java. Thus, PT Merpati Nusantara Airlines was declared not bankrupt.

However, by June 2022, The New Merpati has been presumed no longer return and the airline license has been permanently revoked by the government. Thus, Merpati's obligations to third parties, such as severance pay to former employees, will be settled by selling all of its assets through an auction mechanism.

== Corporate affairs ==
The airline's headquarters were in Central Jakarta. Previously, the airline had been based out of Kemajoran Airport.

== Fleet ==
=== Previous fleet ===
The Merpati fleet included the following aircraft prior to its suspension (as of January 2014):

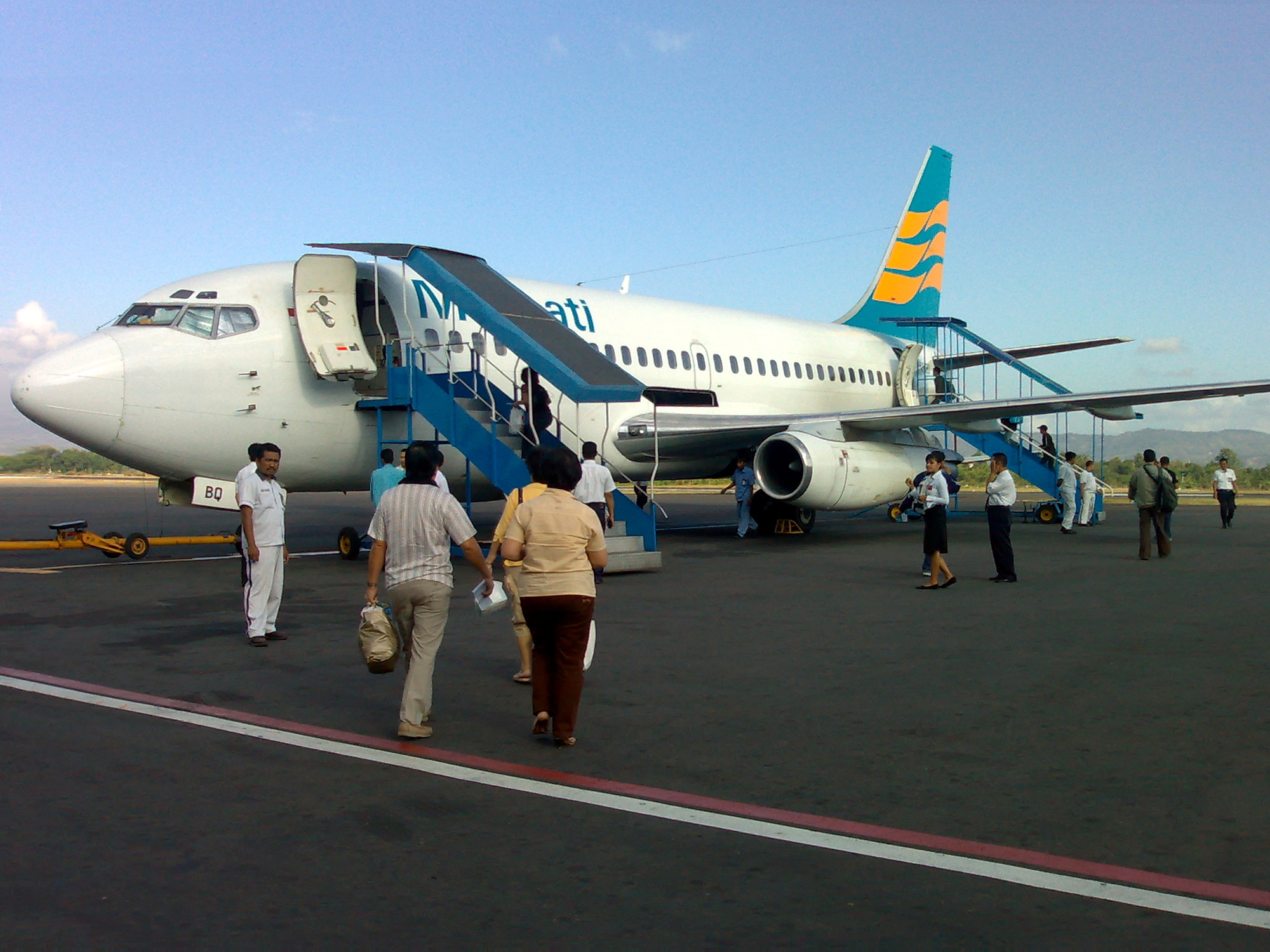
Merpati's Boeing 737-200/adv at Adisucipto International Airport, Yogyakarta.

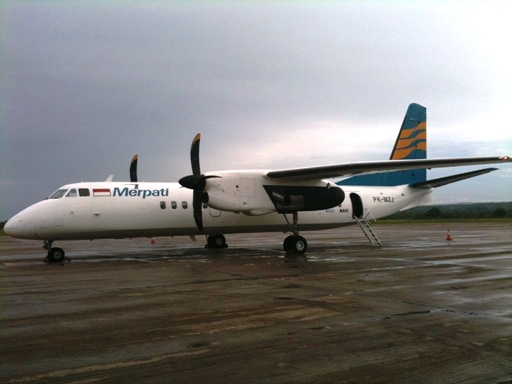
Merpati's MA60, PK-MZJ parked at El Tari Airport, Kupang, in January 2011

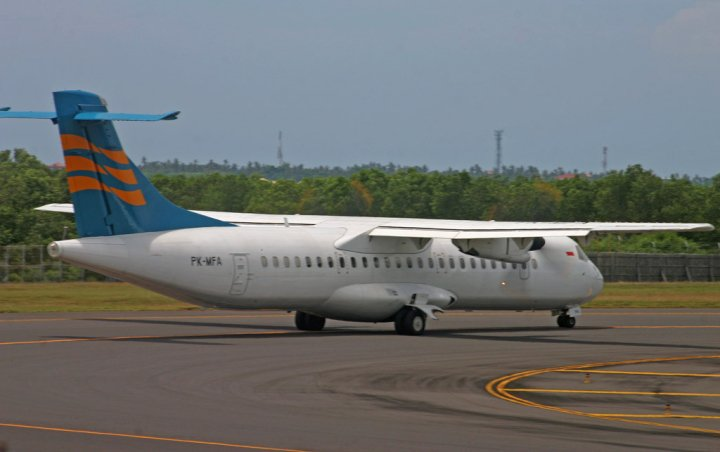
As of 2011, Merpati no longer operates the ATR 72-200 since the arrival of its newer MA60.

Merpati Nusantara Airlines Final Fleet
Aircraft	In Fleet	Orders	Passengers			Routes	Notes
Aircraft	In Fleet	Orders	C	Y	Total	Routes	Notes
Boeing 737-300	3	—	8	126	134	Domestic	
Boeing 737-400	2	—	16	142	158	All	
Boeing 737-500	1	—	0	118	118	All	
Comac ARJ21-700	0	40	0	118	118	—	
De Havilland Canada DHC-6 Twin Otter	5	—	0	20	20	Domestic	
Xian MA60	14	—	0	56	56	Domestic	
Total	25	40	Last updated: March 2014				

Merpati Nusantara Airlines re-launch Fleet
Aircraft	In Fleet	On Order	Passengers			Routes	Notes
Aircraft	In Fleet	On Order	C	Y	Total	Routes	Notes
Airbus A320neo	0	10	TBA			Unknown	
Airbus A321neo	0	8	TBA			Unknown	
Irkut MC-21	0	10+	TBA			Unknown	Ordered by PT Intra Asia Corpora.

=== Fleet development ===
In 2012, Merpati announced that it would take delivery of Airbus A320 aircraft in 2014 but, due to cash problems, this proposal was canceled. Through a restructuring plan and government cash injection, Merpati hoped to relaunch its operations by the end of 2017 or early 2018, most likely using Boeing 737-700 or Boeing 737-800 aircraft. However, this plan was aborted as the airline decided to order other aircraft types instead.

In 2018 Merpati Nusantara signed a letter of intent for 10 Irkut MC-21-300 aircraft.

=== Former fleet ===
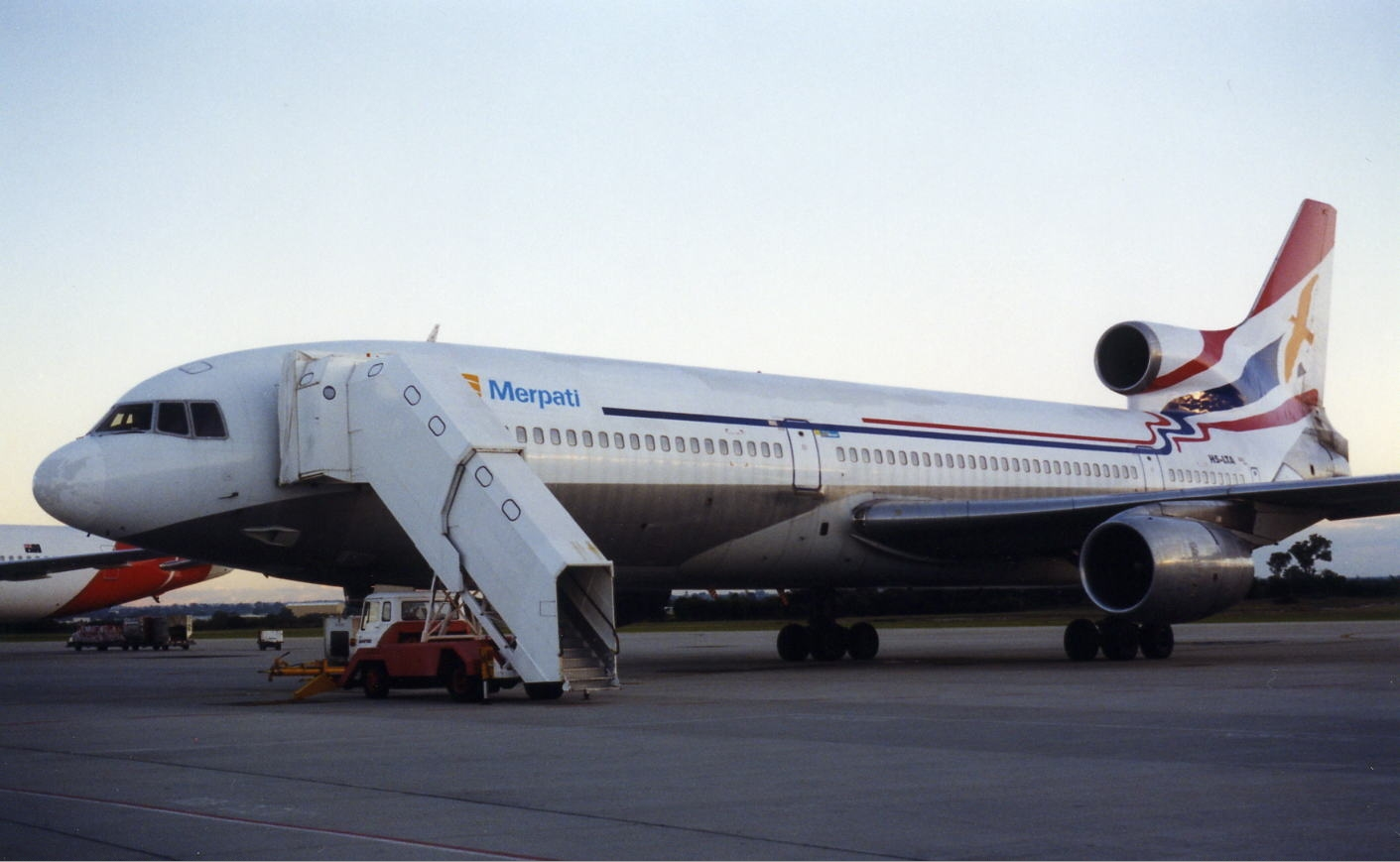
Merpati Lockheed L-1011 TriStar leased from Orient Thai Airlines at Perth Airport (late 1990s).

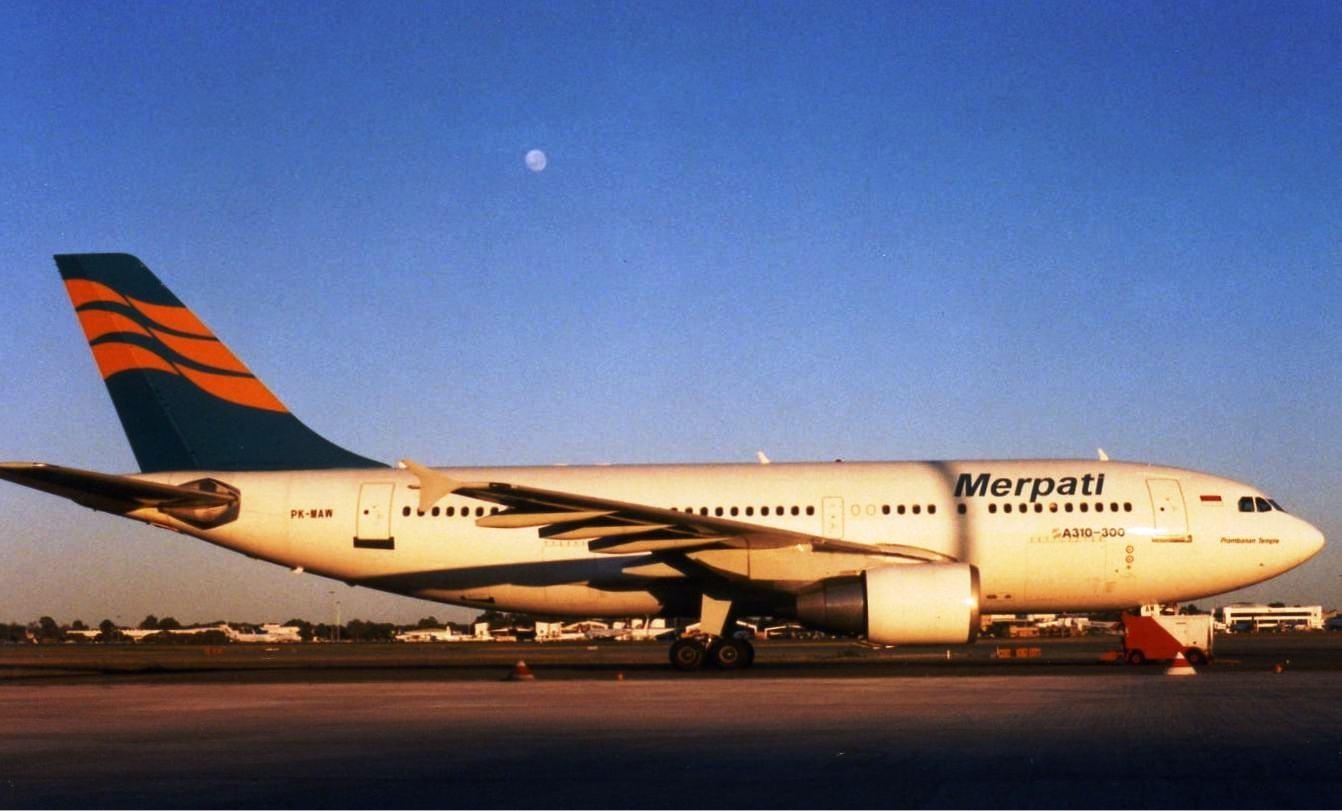
Merpati Airbus A310-300 at Perth Airport (late 1990s).

- ATR 72
- Airbus A300
- Airbus A310
- British Aerospace 146
- British Aerospace ATP
- Boeing 707-120B
- Boeing 707-320C
- Boeing 727
- Boeing 737-200
- Boeing 737-300
- Boeing 737-400
- de Havilland Comet (Not yet confirmed)
- de Havilland Canada DHC-6 Twin Otter
- Douglas DC-9
- Fokker F27 Friendship
- Fokker F28 Fellowship
- Fokker 100
- CASA/IPTN CN-235
- Indonesian Aerospace 212-200
- Hawker Siddeley 748
- NAMC YS-11
- Lockheed L-100 Hercules - operated in passenger configuration
- Lockheed L-1011 TriStar
- Vickers Vanguard
- Vickers Viscount

== Merpati Training Center ==
Merpati Training Center (MTC) is a division of strategic business unit and is one of the largest aviation training centres in Indonesia. It conducts ground school courses for pilots, flight attendants, flight operation officers (dispatchers), commercial airline operations and administration staff in the region. The training centre was founded in 1994 and known as 'Flight Safety Training' training initially Merpati's own staff, but later changed its name to the Merpati Training Center (MTC) in 1999. Some of MTC's clients include the national airline, Garuda Indonesia, Sriwijaya Air, Batavia Air, Lion Air, and Pelita Air Service, among others.

Courses conducted by the MTC include type rating courses for pilots, flight attendants and flight operation officers on the Boeing 737 Classic, AVIC Xian MA60, Fokker F27, CASA CN-235, DHC-6 Twin Otter, CASA C-212 Aviocar, as well as other ground courses including Dangerous Goods Awareness, Airline Transport Pilot License (ATPL) theory, Cockpit Resources Management (CRM), Reduced Vertical Separation Minimum (RVSM), Approach and Landing Accident Reduction (ALAR), Safety Management Systems (SMS), Aviation Security (AVSEC) and Windshear Avoidance.

MTC has two campuses, located in Jakarta and Surabaya. MTC's Jakarta campus is located on 11th Floor of the Merpati Building in Kemayoran, whereas the Surabaya campus is located at Juanda International Airport.

=== Merpati Pilot School ===
Merpati Pilot School's Cessna 172, PK-MSH at Juanda International Airport, Surabaya

On 16 February 2010, the Merpati Pilot School, a department of the MTC, was officially launched at Surabaya's Juanda International Airport. The flying school was awarded its Part 141 certification from the Directorate General of Civil Aviation on 18 August 2009 and currently has a fleet of four Cessna C172s, registered PK-MSA, PK-MSH, PK-MSN and PK-MST. Ground school for cadet pilots are conducted at the Merpati Training Centre in Surabaya, and flight training is conducted from Budiarto Airport, Curug (near Jakarta) as well as Trunojoyo Airport, Sumenep on the island of Madura. Flight Instructors at Merpati Pilot School are all current line pilots with Merpati Nusantara Airlines each with thousands of hours' flying experience.

== Accidents and incidents ==
- On 10 November 1971, a Vickers Viscount (PK-MVS) crashed into the sea 75 miles (121 km) off Sumatra, killing all 69 people on board.
- On 5 April 1972, a Vickers Viscount was the subject of an attempted hijacking. The hijacker was killed.
- On 7 February 1977, a Douglas C-47A (PK-NDH) was damaged beyond economic repair in a landing accident at Tanjung Santan Airport.
- On 5 October 1978, a Douglas C-47A (PK-NDI) caught fire whilst parked at Ngurah Rai International Airport, Bali and was destroyed.
- On 30 January 1991, Flight 7970, a Fokker F27, crashed after takeoff from Sam Ratulangi International Airport; all passengers survived.
- On 18 October 1992, Merpati Nusantara Airlines Flight 5601, a CASA/IPTN CN-235 crashed into Mount Papandayan, killing all 31 passengers and crew on board including Merpati's only female pilot at the time.
- On 1 July 1993, Merpati Nusantara Airlines Flight 724, a Fokker F28 registered as PK-GFU, ditched into the sea off Sorong, West Papua after striking high ground. 41 people were drowned in the incident. 2 people were injured.
- On 30 November 1994, Merpati Nusantara Airlines Flight 422, a Fokker F28 overran the runway at Achmad Yani International Airport with no casualties among the 85 on board.
- On 10 January 1995, Merpati Nusantara Airlines Flight 6715, a de Havilland Canada DHC-6, went missing over the Molo Strait. All 14 people on board were likely killed. Investigators suspected that an explosion occurred on the lower cargo compartment.
- On 19 April 1997, Merpati Nusantara Airlines Flight 106, a British Aerospace ATP, crashed into a coconut plantation in Bulutumbang, killing 15 out of the 53 on board.
- On 7 September 1997, a CASA 212 registered as PK-NCS slammed onto terrain while on approach to Pattimura Airport in Ambon. All 3 people on board were killed.
- On 2 August 2009, Merpati Nusantara Airlines Flight 9760, a de Havilland Canada DHC-6 crashed on the island of New Guinea, about 14 miles (23 km) north of Oksibil. All 16 people on board were killed.
- On 3 December 2009, a Fokker 100 PK-MJD made an emergency landing at El Tari Airport, Kupang when the left main gear failed to extend. There were no injuries among the passengers and crew.
- On 13 April 2010, Merpati Nusantara Airlines Flight 836, a Boeing 737 PK-MDE, trying to land at Rendani Airport split in half after it overran the runway, injuring 44 people.
- On 7 May 2011, Merpati Nusantara Airlines Flight 8968, a Xian MA60 PK-MZK, operating on the Sorong-Kaimana route, crashed in the sea, killing all 25 people on board.
- On 3 December 2011, a CASA C-212 Aviocar passenger plane sustained substantial damage in a landing accident at Larat-Watidar Airport, Indonesia. There were three crew members and 19 passengers on board. Two passengers suffered minor injuries.
- On 10 June 2013, a Xian MA60 PK-MZO, operating Flight 6517 from Bajawa to Kupang with 50 people on board, crash-landed in Kupang, East Nusa Tenggara. One passenger was injured. The aircraft, which has been damaged beyond repair, lay on its belly on the runway with its engines jammed face down into the tarmac and its wings bent forward.
