= Oksibil Airport =

Airport in Oksibil, Highland Papua, Indonesia

Oksibil Airport Bandar Udara Oksibil
- IATA: OKL; ICAO: WAJO

Summary
- Airport type: Public
- Owner: Government of Indonesia
- Serves: Oksibil
- Location: Oksibil, Pegunungan Bintang Regency, Highland Papua, Indonesia
- Time zone: WITA (UTC+09:00)
- Elevation AMSL: 4,288 ft (1,307 m)
- Coordinates: 4.907778°S 140.629444°E

Map
- Location in Western New Guinea Location in Indonesia

Runways
Direction	Length		Surface
Direction	m	ft	Surface
11/29	1,350	4,430	Asphalt

Oksibil Airport (IATA: OKL, ICAO: WAJO) is an airport located at Oksibil, Highland Papua, Indonesia. The airport has connecting flights to Jayapura with Trigana Air Service and Wings Air. The airport's runway is 1,350 metres (4,430 ft) long and is partially marked asphalt (formerly grass) landing strip. The runway can handle Turboprop STOL aircraft but is able to handle larger Turboprop Regional airliner. There are few buildings that acts as a terminal structure as well as a small tower in the tarmac area beside the runway.

== Accidents and incidents ==
- On 16 August 2015 Trigana Air Flight 267 crashed on the mountain side en route to the airstrip killing all 54 on board.
- 3 years later on 12 August 2018 another plane crash occurred, when a Pilatus PC-6 Porter traveling from Tanah Merah crashed shortly before it was due to land in Oksibil. It was carrying nine people, including two crew members, and one passenger survived.

== Airlines and destinations ==
Airlines	Destinations
Trigana Air	Jayapura
