= Oksibil =

- Town
- Location in Western New Guinea and Indonesia Oksibil (Indonesia)
- Coordinates: 4°54′24″S 140°37′39″E
- Country: Indonesia
- Province: Highland Papua
- Regency: Pegunungan Bintang

Population (2018)
  - Total: 4,566
- Time zone: UTC+9 (WIT)

Oksibil is a town and a district of Highland Papua in Indonesia that is also the administrative centre of the Pegunungan Bintang Regency. According to the 2010 census the district had a population of 4,087 inhabitants and in 2018 it increased to 4,566. The town is divided into eight villages (desa), with most populated one being Mabilabol with population of 1,460 in 2018 and the least populated one is Molbib Silibib with only 70 people living there according to Statistics Indonesia. Sex ratio in the district as of 2018 was 147 men for every 100 women. Other than being the most populated, Mabilabol is also the most densely populated village.

Oksibil was the site of a separatist conflict in 2023.

== Infrastructure ==
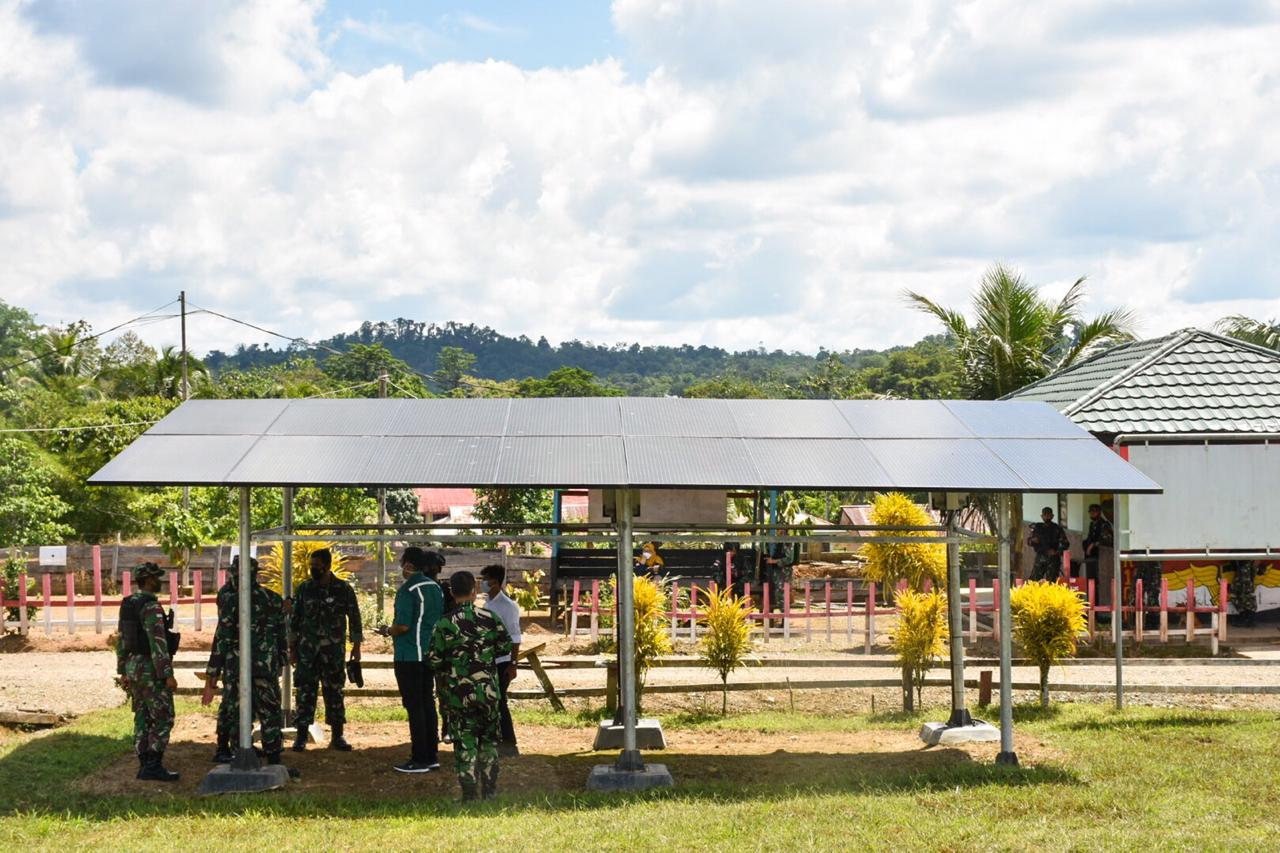
Small solar panel for government building in Oksibil.

There are four elementary schools, two junior high schools, and two senior high schools in the district as of 2018. Healthcare infrastructure in the district consisted of one hospital, two puskesmas, and one healthcare center. There's one mosque, eight protestant churches, and two Catholic churches in the district as of 2018. A hydroelectric plant and a solar panel plant was built in 2012 to serve electricity needs in the town. It is the highest-located solar farm in the world, located between 3,000 meters above sea level. The town also has one university, Okmin University, which is private.

Total roads inside the district is 139 kilometers, out of which 31.86 have not yet been paved with asphalt. The district is served by Oksibil Airport. The district is connected to main cities in Papua such as Merauke and Wamena through Trans-Papua Highway. However, the roads weren't fully paved and only partially finished due to frequent disturbance by armed groups under Free Papua Movement. The construction was halted in 2020 after a construction truck was shot by an armed group.

== Geography ==
The entire district has an area of 248 square kilometers. The district is located within average height of 1,411 meters above the sea but also includes places as high as 3,000 meters above sea level.

=== Climate ===
Oksibil has a very wet although relatively mild tropical rainforest climate (Köppen Af). Average annual temperature is 20.6 °C or 69.1 °F and annual rainfall totals 5,385 millimetres or 212 inches.

Climate data for Oksibil
Month	Jan	Feb	Mar	Apr	May	Jun	Jul	Aug	Sep	Oct	Nov	Dec	Year
Mean daily maximum °C (°F)	25.6 (78.1)	25.5 (77.9)	25.3 (77.5)	25.3 (77.5)	25.0 (77.0)	24.4 (75.9)	23.9 (75.0)	24.0 (75.2)	24.5 (76.1)	25.4 (77.7)	25.9 (78.6)	25.7 (78.3)	25.0 (77.1)
Daily mean °C (°F)	21.0 (69.8)	20.9 (69.6)	21.0 (69.8)	20.9 (69.6)	20.3 (68.5)	20.3 (68.5)	20.0 (68.0)	20.0 (68.0)	20.1 (68.2)	20.7 (69.3)	20.9 (69.6)	21.0 (69.8)	20.6 (69.1)
Mean daily minimum °C (°F)	16.5 (61.7)	16.4 (61.5)	16.7 (62.1)	16.4 (61.5)	16.6 (61.9)	16.2 (61.2)	16.1 (61.0)	16.0 (60.8)	15.8 (60.4)	16.0 (60.8)	16.0 (60.8)	16.4 (61.5)	16.3 (61.3)
Average rainfall mm (inches)	481 (18.9)	446 (17.6)	518 (20.4)	474 (18.7)	451 (17.8)	463 (18.2)	473 (18.6)	450 (17.7)	419 (16.5)	419 (16.5)	369 (14.5)	422 (16.6)	5,385 (212)
Source: Climate-Data.org
