= Hang Nadim International Airport =

Airport in Batam, Riau Islands, Indonesia

Hang Nadim International Airport Bandar Udara Internasional Hang Nadim
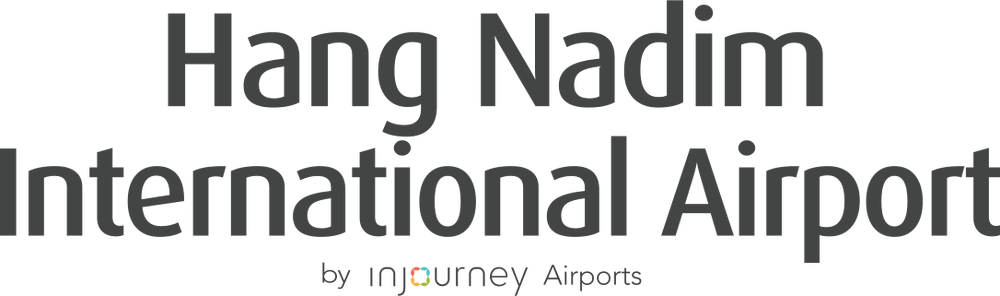

- IATA: BTH; ICAO: WIDD; WMO: 96087

Summary
- Airport type: Public / Military
- Owner: Government of Indonesia
- Operator: InJourney Airports; BP Batam; IIAC
- Serves: Batam metropolitan area
- Location: Batu Besar, Nongsa, Batam, Riau Islands, Indonesia
- Opened: 1978; 48 years ago
- Operating base for: Citilink; Lion Air; Super Air Jet
- Time zone: WIB (UTC+07:00)
- Elevation AMSL: 38 m (125 ft)
- Coordinates: 01°07′15″N 104°07′07″E
- Website: www.bthairport.com

Map
- Location in Riau Islands Location in Sumatra Location in Indonesia

Runways
| Direction | Length | | Surface |
| Direction | m | ft | Surface |
|---|---|---|---|
| 04/22 | 4,028 | 13,218 | Asphalt |

Statistics (2024)
- Passengers: 4,173,425 (▲5.3%)
- Cargo (tonnes): 35,843 (▲19.5%)
- Aircraft movements: 30,288 (▲2.5%)
- Source: DGCA

Hang Nadim International Airport (IATA: BTH, ICAO: WIDD) is an international airport located in Batam, the largest city in Riau Islands province, Indonesia. It is named after Laksamana Hang Nadim Pahlawan Kechik, a legendary Malay warrior from the region. The airport is the primary method of transport to and from Batam, alongside ferries to neighboring islands, including the sovereign city-state of Singapore in the north. The airport has the largest runway in Indonesia and the second-longest in Southeast Asia. This stems from its original development to handle diversions of aircraft from Singapore Changi Airport located approximately 30 kilometres (19 miles) away in the case of emergencies or inclement weather, and as such has sufficient facilities for wide-body aircraft including the Boeing 747s, Boeing 777s and Airbus A380s. The airport stretches over 1,800 hectares (4,400 acres), of which only 40% is normally used.

By the end of May 2014, it was the sixth airport in Indonesia to operate 24 hours a day. The move was the result of many airlines making the airport a hub for their operations. Lion Air has developed a base at the airport as Soekarno–Hatta International Airport is severely congested. Currently, the airport is the second-busiest airport in the Sumatra region, after Kualanamu International Airport in Medan, and is served by flights to major Indonesian cities such as Jakarta, Surabaya, Medan, and Balikpapan. It also offers international services to Malaysia as well as Seasonal hajj flights to Saudi Arabia. The airport also has an aircraft maintenance facility which is gradually transforming into a hub for aircraft maintenance.

In addition to serving as a commercial airport, Hang Nadim International Airport also share its facility with Hang Nadim Air Force Base, a Type-C facility of the Indonesian Air Force.

== History ==
=== Planning and opening ===
Construction of an airport in Batam was first initiated in the early 1970s as part of Phase I of Batam's development by Pertamina. Initially, the airport was planned to be constructed near Tanjung Uncang, on the western side of Batam. This location was selected not only for its favorable topography but also due to the presence of nearby waters that were already busy with local ports, making it suitable for the unloading of construction materials. However, the project was ultimately halted. Upon learning about the proposed construction of a new airport in Batam, the Singaporean authorities raised strong objections. They argued that the operation of the new airport could result in airspace conflicts with their own airport operations in the Paya Lebar area—particularly during takeoff and landing procedures. If the project were to proceed, they warned, they would be unable to grant permission for the use of surrounding airspace. At the time, airspace over the entire Riau Archipelago was still managed by Singapore, in accordance with a decision by the International Civil Aviation Organization (ICAO). The Flight Information Region (FIR) covering the Riau Islands was administered by Singapore based on an ICAO convention held in Dublin, Ireland, in March 1946. The process of surveying and determining the site for an airport in Batam was later resumed with the involvement of a Singaporean consultant, Robin Ednasa, during the period when Batam was administered by the Batam Authority, around 1976. This led to the selection of a location in the Batu Besar area. The same corporate group, Robin Shipyard, had previously been involved in the construction of the Batu Ampar seaport in the early 1970s, during the time Batam was managed by Pertamina.

The decision to name the airport in Batam after Hang Nadim was made under the directive of B.J. Habibie, who was then the head of the Batam Authority. He emphasized that the name should reflect the local wisdom of the Malay community in the Riau Islands, yet it should not be drawn from figures or names that were already widely used. The selection of Hang Nadim sparked some questions at the time. According to local folklore familiar to Batam residents, Hang Nadim was a young boy who famously assisted the Kingdom of Singapura in the legend "Singapore Attacked by Swordfish," which is part of the Malay Annals.

The airport officially began operations two years later, around 1978, initially serving special and chartered flights to and from Batam Island. At the outset, the airport featured a runway that was just 850 meters long, limiting it to aircraft such as Twin Otters, Skyvans, and helicopters. The terminal building of the early Hang Nadim Airport was constructed in a simple, semi-permanent manner, with the upper walls made of plywood. Similarly, the airport's control tower was built with basic materials, reflecting the modest infrastructure of the time.

=== Expansion and contemporary history ===
In Phase II of its development, the runway at Hang Nadim Airport was extended to 2,500 x 45 meters. At the same time, the terminal building was relocated approximately 500 meters from its original site and expanded to accommodate growing traffic. Following the runway extension, B.J. Habibie, then Chairman of the Batam Authority, held discussions with Wiweko Soepono, the President Director of Garuda Indonesia, to facilitate regular flights to and from Batam. Initially, Garuda Indonesia operated just one flight per week, but by 1984, the airline had increased its frequency to daily flights. While continuing to operate Terminal B, the Batam Authority began work on Phase II of Hang Nadim Airport's development. The runway was further extended to 3,600 x 45 meters, a move made in anticipation of Hang Nadim becoming an international hub. By 1988, the extended runway had enabled Hang Nadim Airport to serve commercial flights to several major domestic cities, including Jakarta, Pekanbaru, Medan, and Palembang. Domestic airlines such as Garuda Indonesia, Sempati Air, and Merpati Nusantara Airlines operated at the airport, alongside an international cargo charter flight by Sabang Merauke Raya Air Charter (SMAC), which connected to Paya Lebar Airport in Singapore.

Phase III of the airport development began in 1989 and was completed in 1995. During this phase, the construction of the new terminal commenced, alongside finishing work such as detailed design and supervision, civil works, and the installation of aeronautical equipment, including ground support systems. Additionally, the full distribution system was completed, along with a 400-meter extension to the runway. Other ongoing tasks included finalizing the airport's electrical and mechanical systems, security infrastructure, landscaping, and furniture. Upon the completion of the development, the airport was upgraded to international status in 1995. During the inauguration on December 11, 1995, Habibie highlighted that supporting facilities, including an aircraft maintenance center, would be developed in the coming years. This expansion is part of the broader vision to transform Hang Nadim Airport into an 'aerocity.'

Following its upgrade to international status, Hang Nadim International Airport was intended to compete with Singapore Changi Airport as a regional aviation hub, supported by significantly lower landing and parking charges. However, efforts to strengthen its competitiveness were constrained by issues such as an unreliable aviation fuel (avtur) supply, despite attempts by BP Batam to secure lower fuel prices through negotiations with Pertamina. In practice, the airport's international operations remained limited in the years following its designation, largely confined to annual Hajj flights. During this period, Garuda Indonesia announced plans to route flights from Jakarta to Jeddah via Batam beginning in late 1996, with increased frequencies scheduled from 1997 and similar adjustments proposed for other international routes. These initiatives were regarded as early steps toward developing Hang Nadim as a transit hub, although broader ambitions to establish it as a major regional hub faced ongoing challenges.

== Facilities and development ==
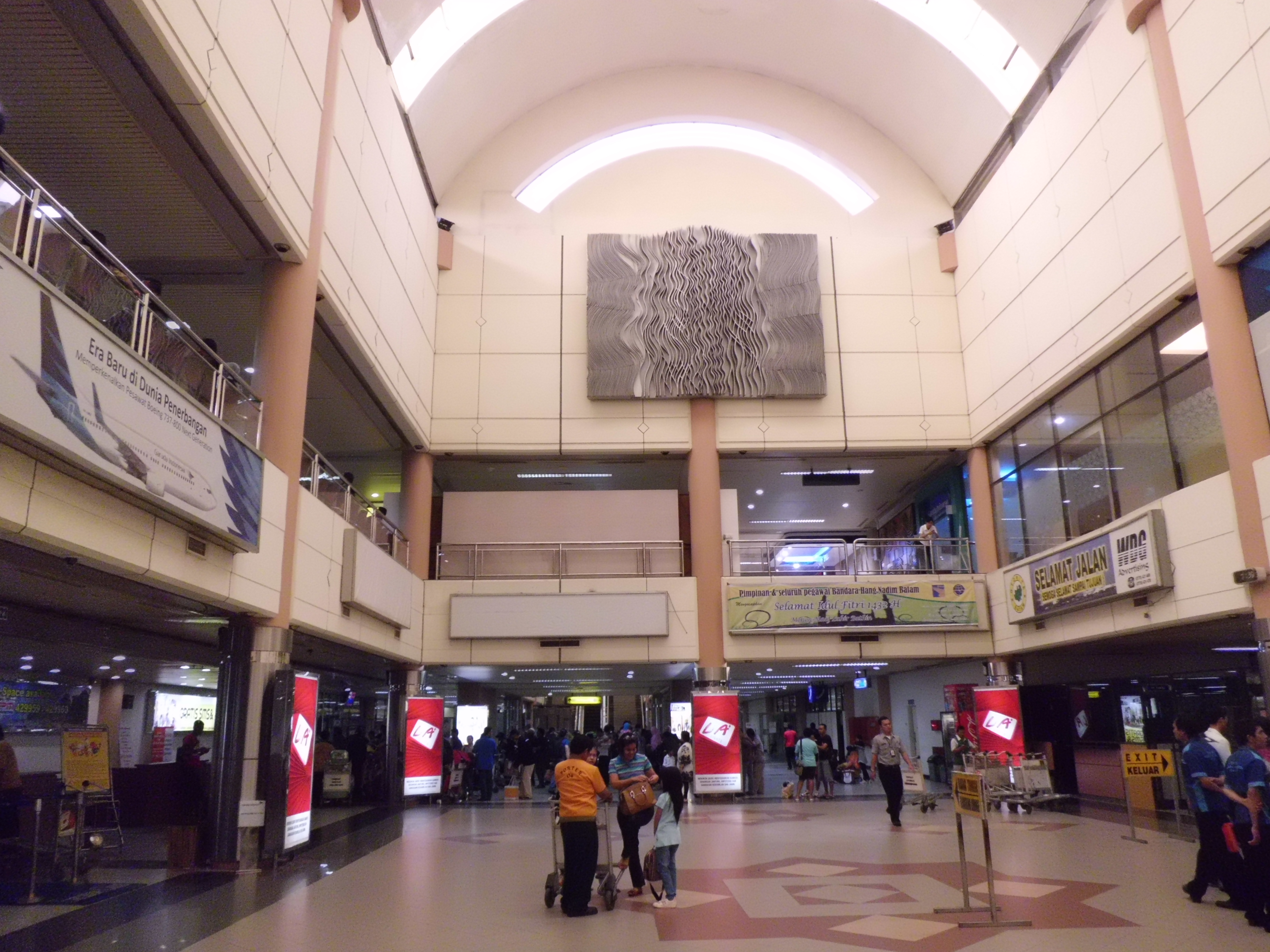
Check-in hall

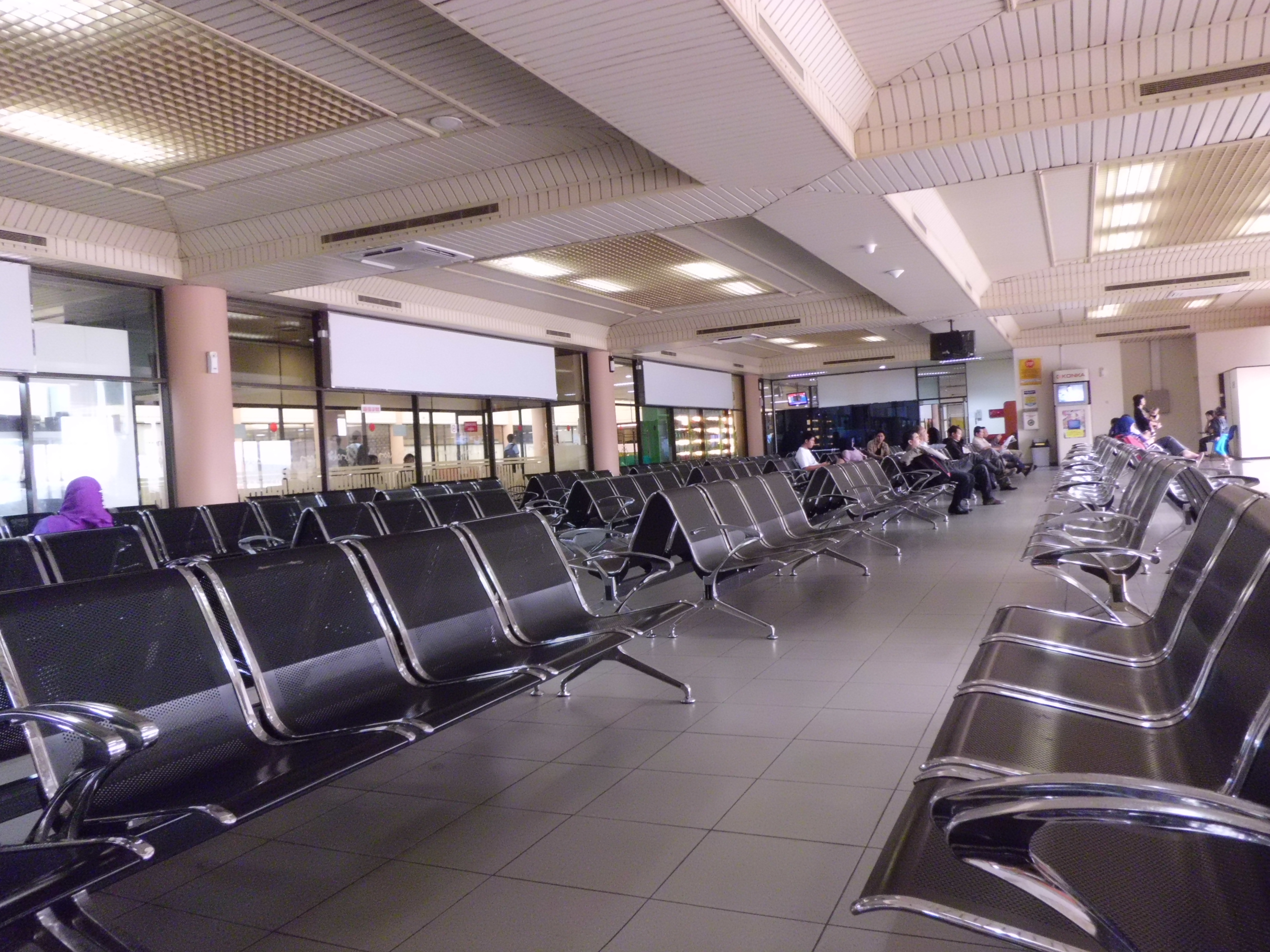
Boarding gate

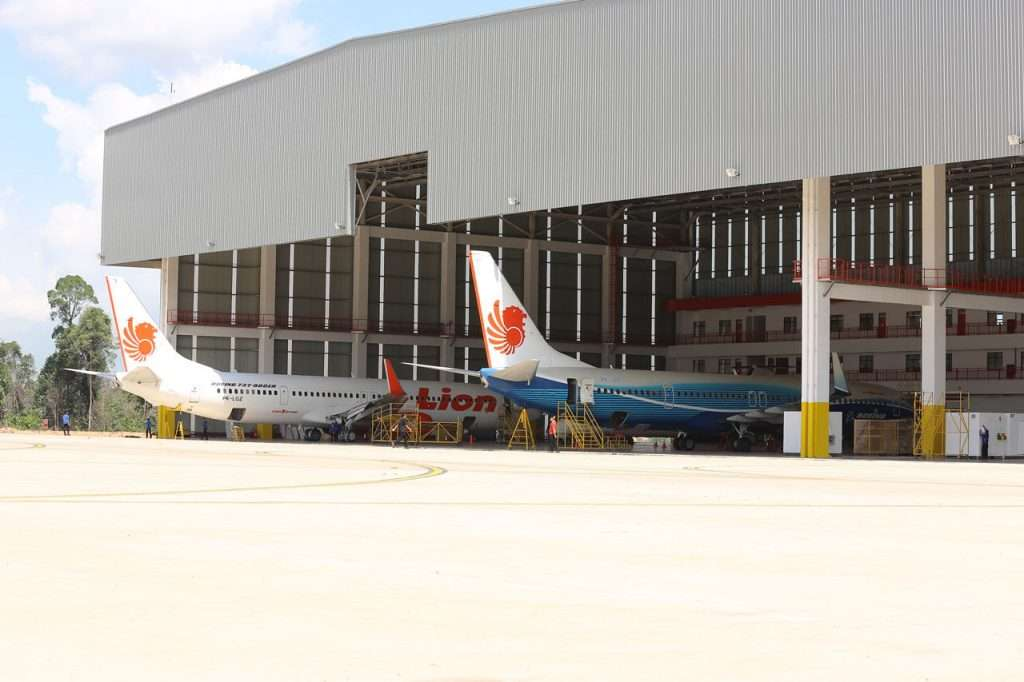
Aircraft undergoing maintenance at the Batam Aero Technic (BAT) MRO facilities

The airport has a single runway measuring 4,025 x 45 meters, with a PCN rating of 85, capable of accommodating wide-body aircraft such as the Boeing 747 and Airbus A380. The airport is also equipped with 6 gates and 10 airbridges. The apron area spans 690 m x 140 m and 225 m x 49 m, capable of accommodating 8 wide-body aircraft and 5 medium-sized aircraft, or 16 narrow-body aircraft and 5 medium-sized aircraft. On the ground side, Hang Nadim Airport features a passenger terminal covering 30,000 m^{2}, a cargo terminal of 1,685 m^{2}, and a public garden area of 236,624 m^{2}. The airport has a passenger capacity of approximately 5 million annually. During peak operational hours, the passenger flow can reach up to 1,400 passengers per day.

BP Batam, the airport operator, plans a major infrastructure expansion project valued at US$448 million. The development includes the construction of a second terminal, while the existing terminal will be expanded from a capacity of 4 million to 8 million passengers per year and equipped with six jet bridges. The new terminal, to be developed in phases, will initially accommodate up to 8 million passengers annually and feature eight jet bridges. Upon completion, the airport's total capacity will reach 16 million passengers per year, supported by 14 jet bridges in total. The project is being carried out in collaboration with Garuda Indonesia, Lion Air, and Incheon International Airport Corporation, which will assist in the development of the new terminal. In addition, a large-scale Aerocity development is planned, covering approximately 1,763 hectares. This concept integrates the airport, logistics facilities, a central business district (CBD), and the aviation industry within a single business ecosystem. The master plan also includes supporting infrastructure such as golf courses, hotels, retail areas, recreation centers, a convention center, offices for e-commerce and telecommunications, logistics facilities, and a monorail system. The development is intended to position Batam as a business travel destination and a regional aerotropolis.

In March 2021, a PPP for the expansion of the airport was awarded to a consortium of Angkasa Pura I, Incheon International Airport Corporation and state-owned construction company PT Wijaya Karya. The 25 year concession includes the improvement of passenger and cargo terminal facilities.

=== Aircraft maintenance facilities ===
In 2014, the Lion Air Group established its subsidiary, Batam Aero Technic (BAT), which invested in Hang Nadim International Airport through the development of Maintenance, Repair, and Overhaul (MRO) facilities. BAT is capable of performing maintenance on a wide range of aircraft types, including the Airbus A320 and A330 series, Boeing 737 series, Hawker 800/900XP, and ATR 72-500/600, among others. The facility has a hangar capacity of 19 maintenance lines, supporting activities such as line maintenance, minor checks, major defect rectification, heavy checks, transit checks, and redelivery. It is also equipped with two aircraft painting facilities, a cleaning hangar, a 4,000 m^{2} spare parts warehouse, and a dedicated component maintenance workshop. The BAT complex has been developed on approximately 30 hectares of land provided by BP Batam. Supporting infrastructure includes a 7.7-hectare aircraft apron, 2.8 km of internal roads, and an electricity capacity of 4.7 MW. BAT's logistics operations are supported by an integrated supply chain and warehouse system for tools and spare parts used in maintenance workshops. These include facilities for cabin interiors, galleys, lavatories, overhead compartments, furnishings such as seats and carpets, as well as engine, propeller, and emergency equipment maintenance. The company supports aircraft maintenance operations at more than 40 airports, handling over 800 flight movements daily to ensure airworthiness and operational safety. It currently provides maintenance services for airlines such as Jhonlin Air Transport, Drukair, Asia Cargo Airlines, US-Bangla Airlines, Lion Air, Wings Air, Batik Air, Lion Bizjet, Batik Air Malaysia, Thai Lion Air, Angkasa Aviation Academy, and Super Air Jet, with plans to gradually expand services to additional carriers.

In addition to Lion Air, Indonesia's flag carrier Garuda Indonesia has also planned to establish MRO facilities in Batam through its subsidiary, GMF AeroAsia. The project is expected to be developed in cooperation with the Japanese company Mitsui & Co., with an estimated investment of up to US$100 million. Initially, construction was targeted to begin in the second half of 2017, with operations expected to commence in the second half of 2018. The project was expected to involve several foreign partners affiliated with GMF AeroAsia. The planned facility was projected to capture a share of the international aircraft maintenance market. Supporting infrastructure was to include a logistics warehouse to ensure the availability of spare parts for hangar operations within the complex. In 2019, GMF AeroAsia and BAT signed a joint venture agreement to establish an airframe maintenance facility in Batam.

Currently, the Indonesian government is actively encouraging other airlines to establish MRO facilities in Batam in order to accommodate the growing number of aircraft operating in Indonesia.

== Airlines and destinations ==
=== Passenger ===
| Airlines | Destinations |
|---|---|
| AirAsia | Kuala Lumpur–International |
| Batik Air | Jakarta–Soekarno-Hatta |
| Batik Air Malaysia | Kuala Lumpur–International, Penang |
| Citilink | Jakarta–Soekarno-Hatta, Medan, Palembang, Pekanbaru, Siborong-Borong, Surabaya, Yogyakarta–International |
| Garuda Indonesia | Jakarta–Soekarno-Hatta |
| Jeju Air | Seoul–Incheon (resumes 24 December 2026) |
| Lion Air | Balikpapan, Jakarta–Soekarno-Hatta, Medan, Padang, Palembang, Pekanbaru, Pontianak, Surabaya; Seasonal: Jeddah |
| NAM Air | Jakarta–Soekarno-Hatta, Ranai |
| Saudia | Seasonal: Jeddah |
| Sriwijaya Air | Jambi |
| Super Air Jet | Bandar Lampung, Bandung–Husein Sastranegara (begins 16 December 2026), Jakarta–Soekarno-Hatta, Jambi, Padang, Pekanbaru, Semarang, Siborong-Borong, Yogyakarta–International |
| Susi Air | Dabo, Pasir Pengaraian, Rengat |
| Wings Air | Dumai (begins 5 December 2026), Letung, Pangkal Pinang, Ranai; Seasonal: Pasir Pengaraian |

== Traffic ==
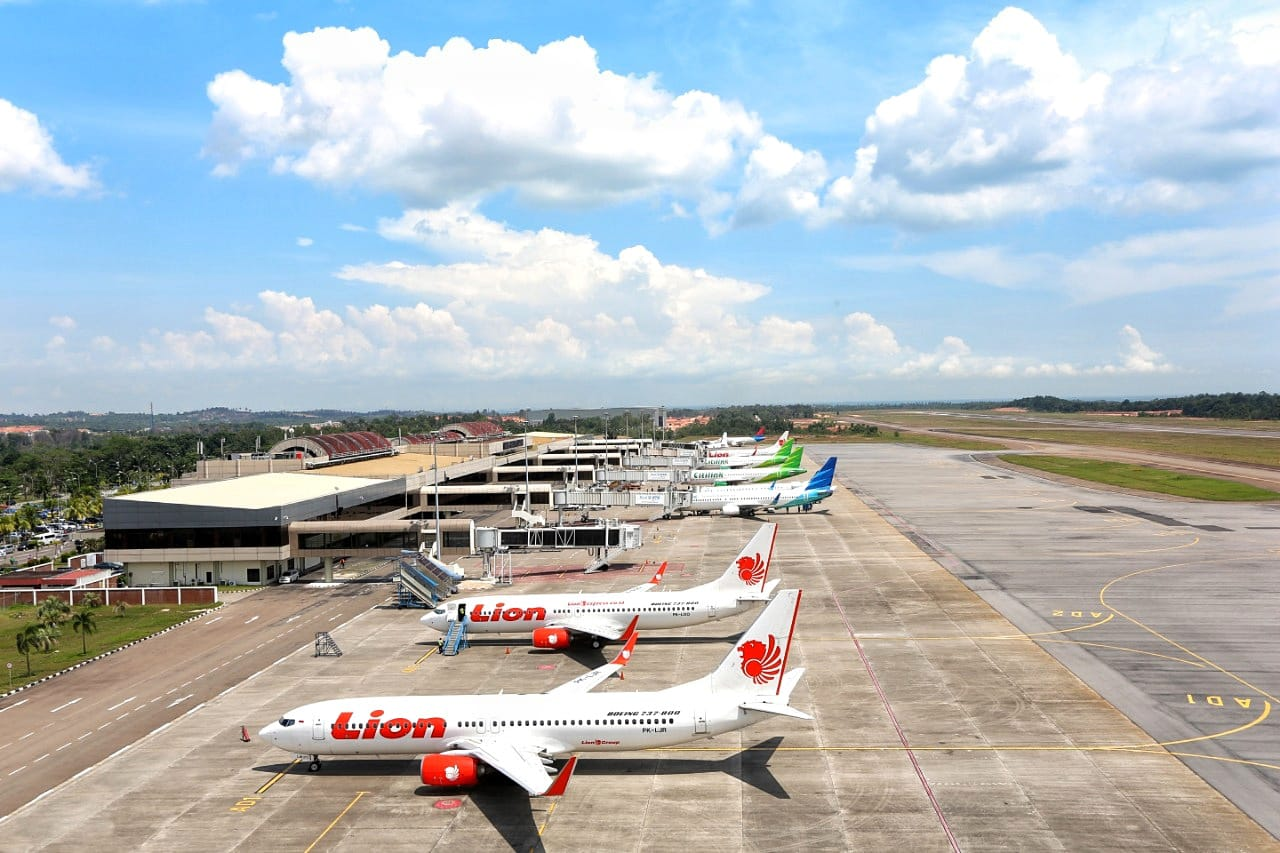
Airlines lining up at Hang Nadim International Airport

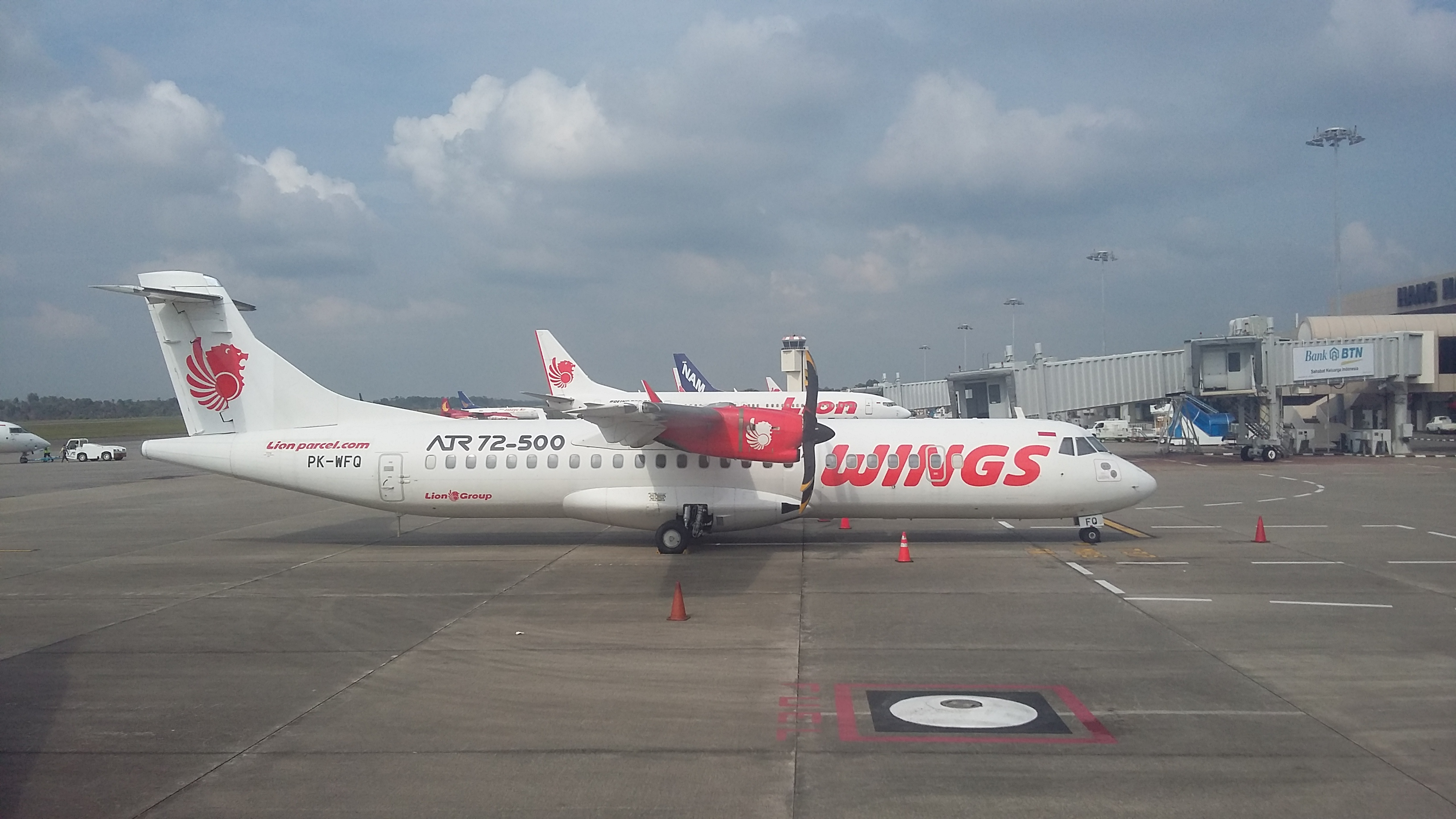
Wings Air ATR-72-500 at Hang Nadim International Airport

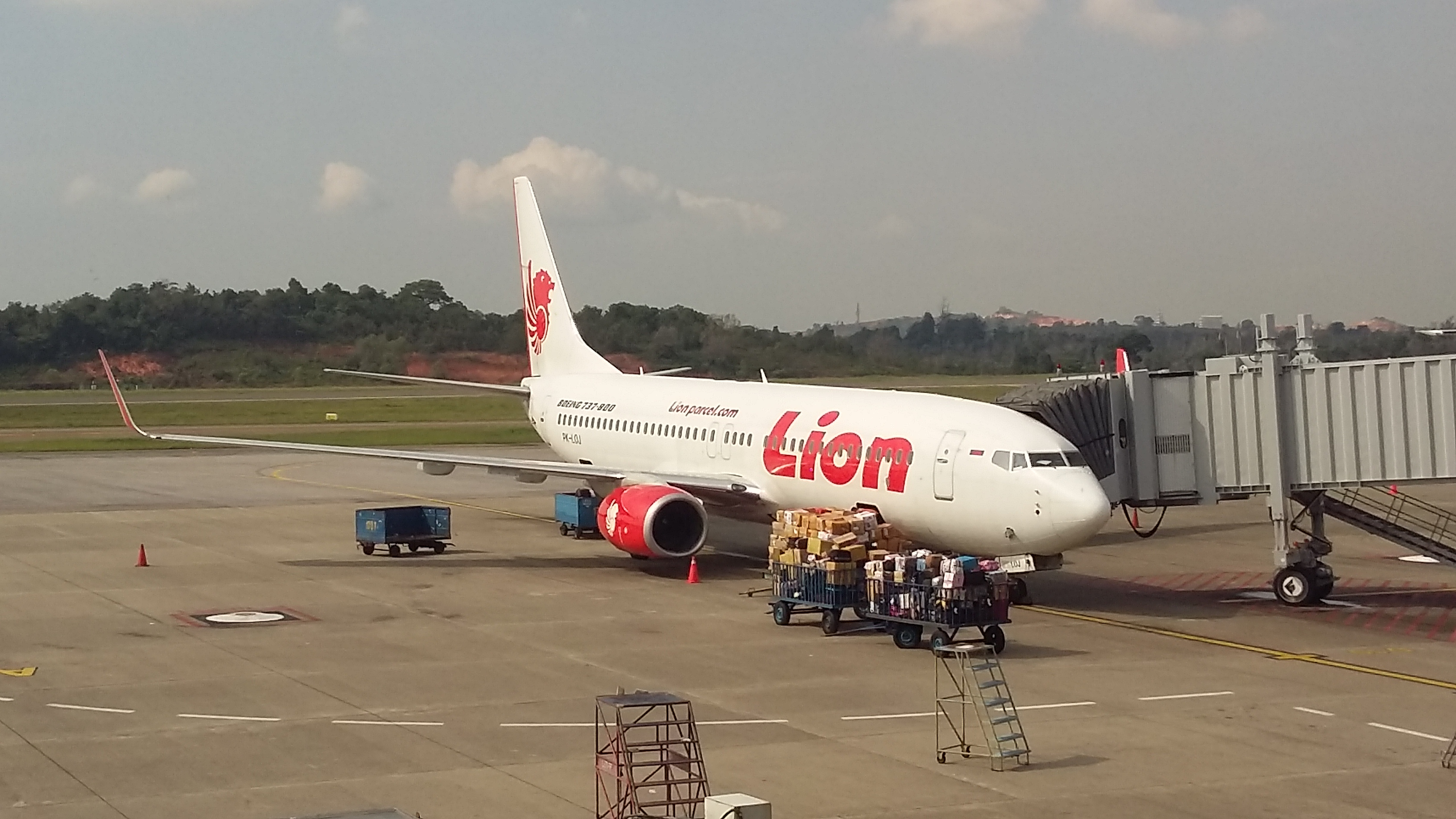
Lion Air Boeing 737-800 at Hang Nadim International Airport

Annual passenger numbers and aircraft statistics
| Year | Passengers handled | Passenger % change | Cargo (tonnes) | Cargo % change | Aircraft movements | Aircraft % change |
|---|---|---|---|---|---|---|
| 2006 | 2,617,000 | Steady | 22,574 | Steady | 28,765 | Steady |
| 2007 | 2,835,000 | ▲8.3 | 27,061 | ▲19.9 | 29,600 | ▲2.9 |
| 2008 | 2,682,000 | ▼5.4 | 28,421 | ▲5.0 | 27,641 | ▼6.6 |
| 2009 | 2,910,000 | ▲8.5 | 25,284 | ▼11.0 | 26,850 | ▼2.9 |
| 2010 | 3,332,000 | ▲14.5 | 28,754 | ▲13.7 | 27,588 | ▲2.7 |
| 2011 | 3,385,000 | ▲1.6 | 30,131 | ▲4.8 | 28,595 | ▲3.7 |
| 2012 | 3,762,000 | ▲11.1 | 35,529 | ▲17.9 | 31,657 | ▲10.7 |
| 2013 | 4,212,000 | ▲12.0 | 35,433 | ▼0.3 | 35,770 | ▲13.0 |
| 2014 | 4,772,000 | ▲13.3 | 24,064 | ▼32.1 | 39,797 | ▲11.3 |
| 2015 | 5,009,785 | ▲5.0 | 37,335 | ▲55.1 | 40,424 | ▲1.6 |
| 2016 | 6,135,671 | ▲22.5 | 43,170 | ▲15.6 | 42,787 | ▲5.8 |
| 2017 | 6,326,783 | ▲3.1 | 48,324 | ▲11.9 | 44,762 | ▲4.6 |
| 2018 | 5,625,846 | ▼11.1 | 56,891 | ▲17.7 | 42,008 | ▼6.2 |
| 2019 | 4,535,185 | ▼19.4 | 44,552 | ▼21.7 | 36,018 | ▼14.3 |
| 2020 | 2,684,391 | ▼40.8 | 29,673 | ▼33.4 | 24,018 | ▼33.3 |
| 2021 | 2,233,071 | ▼16.8 | 30,361 | ▲2.3 | 20,436 | ▼14.9 |
| 2022 | 3,652,466 | ▲63.6 | 30,117 | ▼0.8 | 27,452 | ▲34.3 |
| 2023 | 3,965,107 | ▲8.6 | 30,004 | ▼0.4 | 29,543 | ▲7.6 |
| 2024 | 4,173,425 | ▲5.3 | 35,843 | ▲19.5 | 30,288 | ▲2.5 |
^{Source: DGCA, BP Batam}

== Incidents and accidents ==
- On 10 March 2008, Adam Air Flight 292, a Boeing 737-400 registered as PK-KKT, flying from Jakarta to Batam, skidded 75 metres (246 ft; 82 yd) off the end of the runway while landing in Batam. All 171 passengers and 6 crew members survived, with two passengers treated for shock. The plane sustained damage to one wing and was ultimately written off by its lessor. This accident contributed to the airline's demise, just eight days later, and the formal revocation of its AOC three months later. The incident also illustrated that crew were not trained correctly on evacuation procedures. In particular, during the evacuation of this aircraft no slides were deployed to allow the passengers off the aircraft.
- On May 5, 2010, a 12 m diameter hole was created when the surface collapsed beside a runway. Airport authorities blamed the incident on corroded steel structures supporting the drainage culverts.
- On August 9, 2017, the Head of Batam Airport Hang Nadim Suwarso confirmed that a large hole measuring 12 meters by 5 meters by 2 meters deep on a taxiway had caused the surface of the asphalt layer to collapse. This was the second reported accident of soil collapse at the airport.
