= Flight 62 =

Flight 62 may refer to:

- Iberia Flight 062
- Sriwijaya Air Flight 062
