= Sriwijaya Air accident =

Sriwijaya Air crash could refer to

- Sriwijaya Air Flight 62, which crashed in August 2008
- Sriwijaya Air Flight 182, which crashed in January 2021
