= Sriwijaya Air =

Indonesian airline

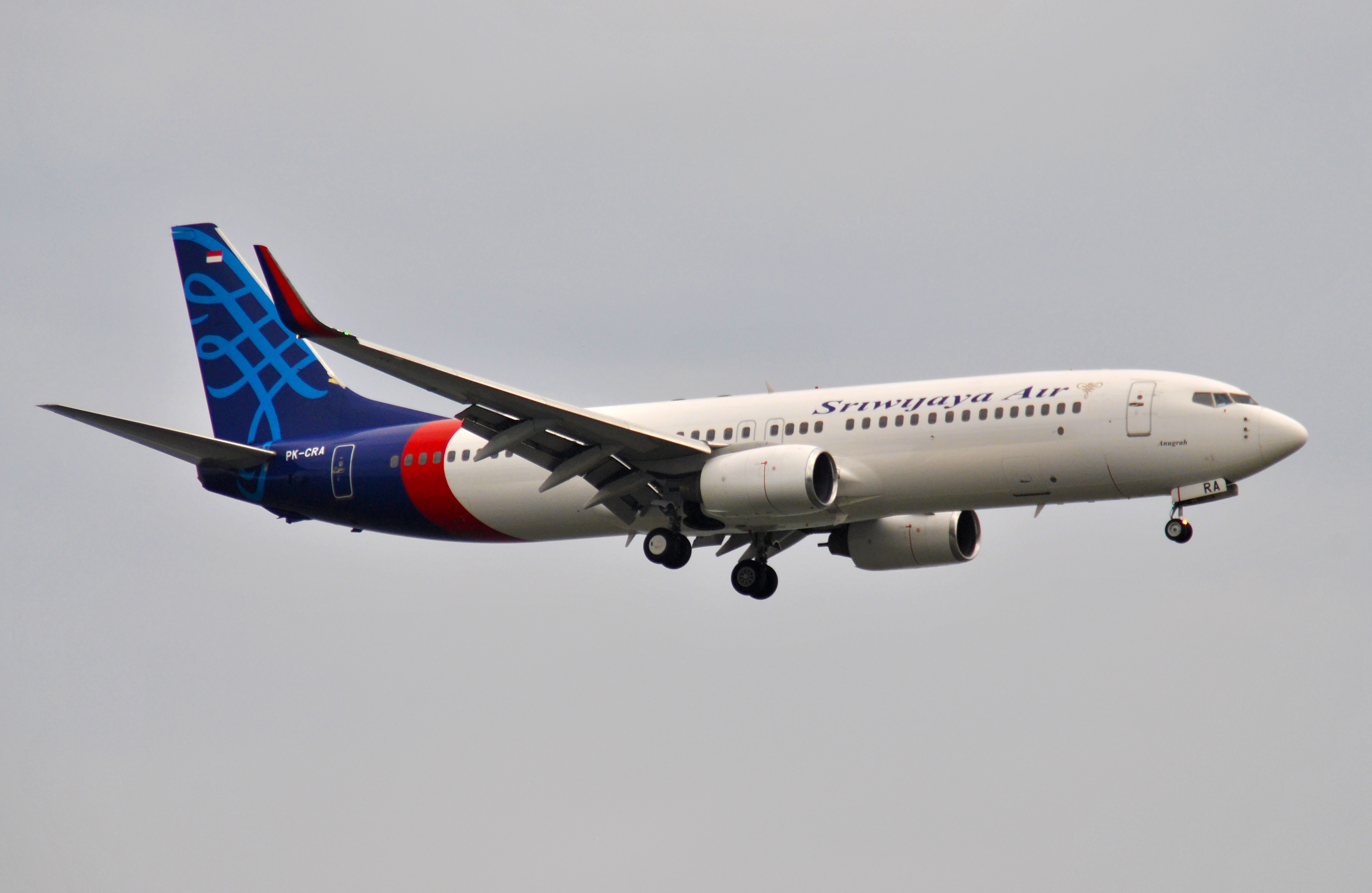
IATA	ICAO	Call sign
SJ	SJY	SRIWIJAYA
- Founded: 7 November 2002; 24 years ago
- Commenced operations: 10 November 2003; 23 years ago
- Operating bases: Makassar; Jakarta–Soekarno-Hatta
- Subsidiaries: NAM Air
- Fleet size: 8
- Destinations: 15
- Headquarters: Tangerang, Indonesia
- Key people: Jeferson I. Jauwena, Direktur Utama; Chandra Lie, Presiden Komisaris
- Founders: Chandra Lie; Hendry Lie; Andi Halim; Fandy Lingga
- Employees: 500
- Website: www.sriwijayaair.co.id

Sriwijaya Air is an Indonesian airline headquartered and based at Soekarno–Hatta International Airport in Tangerang, Banten. It began its operations on 10 November 2003, and flies scheduled and chartered services on domestic routes within Indonesia as well as international routes to neighbouring countries. The airline's slogan is "Your Flying Partner".

Sriwijaya Air is rated as a three-star Airline by Skytrax.

== History ==
=== Founding (2003) ===
Sriwijaya Air was founded in 2003 by Chandra Lie, Hendry Lie, Andi Halim, and Fandy Lingga, who named it after the historical Srivijaya empire. On 28 April 2003, it obtained its business license, while the AOC (Air Operator's Certificate) was issued later that year on 28 October. The airline commenced operations on 10 November 2003 with a maiden flight between Jakarta and Pangkal Pinang, operated by a single Boeing 737-300. This was followed by flights between Jakarta and Pontianak as well as Jakarta and Palembang. After its first year, the airline's growth enabled it to acquire four further Boeing 737-300s.

=== Growth (2007–2012) ===
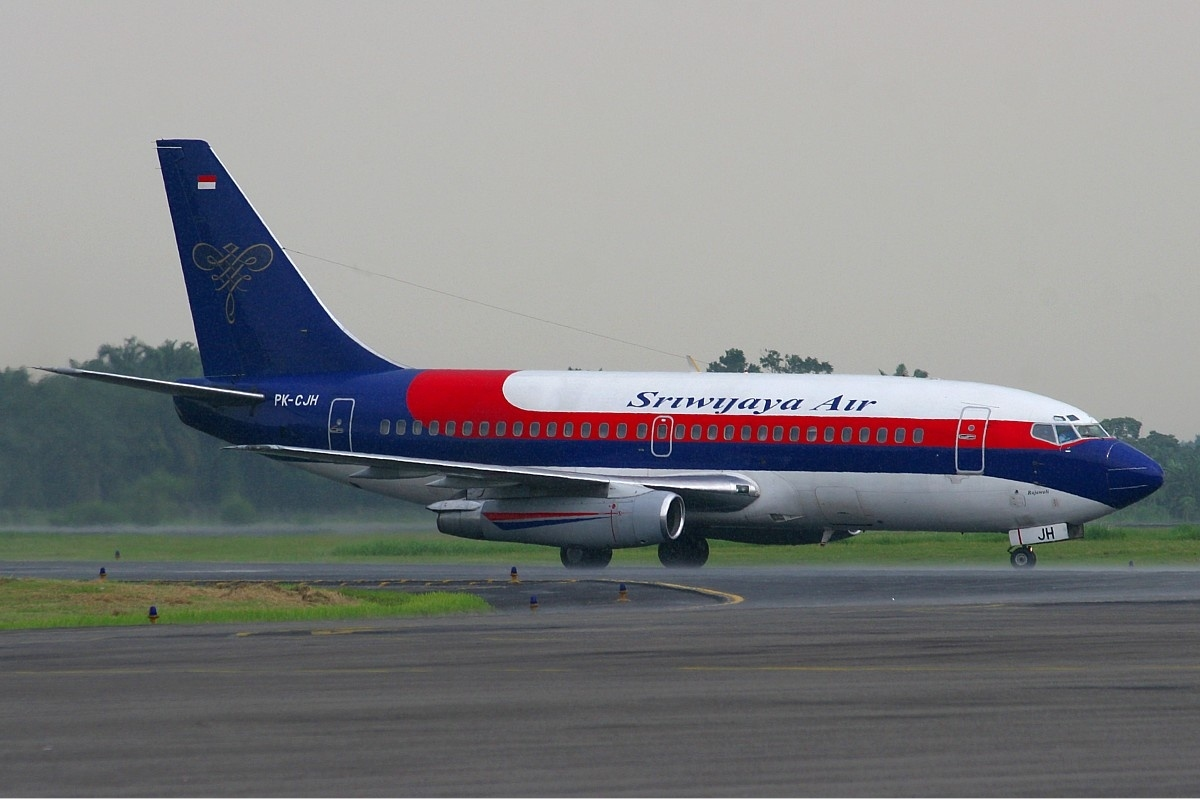
Sriwijaya AirBoeing 737-200

In 2007, Sriwijaya Air received the Boeing International Award for Safety and Maintenance of aircraft, awarded after passing the manufacturer's inspection that was carried out over a few months. On 18 December 2008, the airline commenced its first international operations serving a route between Jakarta and Singapore. By 2010, the airline was operating 27 aircraft and had served 7.18 million passengers and took an 11.8% share of the Indonesian domestic flight market.

On 20 June 2011, at the 2011 Paris Air Show, Sriwijaya Air agreed to buy 20 Embraer 190 jets, with purchase rights for 10 more. However, this order was suspended in 2012, citing pending price negotiations and considerations on keeping fleet commonality with Boeing aircraft. The airline's fleet expansion plans was followed by an announcement to acquire 12 used Boeing 737-500s from Continental Airlines on 11 November 2011 in a leasing deal worth $84 million. The aircraft were destined to replace the airline's ageing Boeing 737-200 fleet, with deliveries taking place between April and December 2011.

In 2012, the airline introduced its first of six Boeing 737-800 aircraft in an expansion bid to fly routes to China. On 5 May 2012, Sriwijaya Air launched a Business Class service in a bid to become more upmarket, with the reconfiguration of its fleet to feature the new cabin. In February 2013, the airline announced its plans to enter the full service market with its subsidiary, NAM Air. In August 2013, the airline completed phasing out its Boeing 737-200 fleet, with plans to replace its entire Boeing 737 Classic fleet with the 10 Boeing 737 Next Generation aircraft it had on order. Its subsidiary, NAM Air commenced operations on 11 December 2013 and was repurposed as a feeder carrier for mainline Sriwijaya services.

=== Full-service ambitions and expansion (2012–2017) ===
In 2012, Sriwijaya Air begun its planned transition into becoming a full-service carrier; this saw the reconfiguration of its entire fleet to be equipped with a business class cabin to fulfil the Indonesian government's criteria for a full service-carrier. However, by 2015, the airline admitted that it was not yet able to complete the transition, attributing it to several factors being unprepared for the goal; the airline instead remained as a medium service carrier, with commitments to a future transition to being a full-service carrier notwithstanding.

On 22 January 2014, the airline launched its first charter services to China, operating flights between Bali and Hangzhou, Nanjing, and Ningbo between January and February of that year. On 17 June 2015, Sriwijaya Air signed an order for two 737-900ER with a purchase option to acquire up to 20 Boeing 737 MAX at the 2015 Paris Airshow. This became the airline's first order for brand-new aircraft after nearly 12 years of operation. It took delivery of its first and second Boeing 737-900ER at the Boeing Delivery Center in Seattle on 23 August 2015.

In September 2016, Sriwijaya Air announced its plans to acquire three used Boeing 777-200 aircraft to enable long-haul operations to China and hajj charter operations to Saudi Arabia, subject to funding from an initial public offering (IPO) anticipated in 2017. In November 2016, the plan to acquire said aircraft was amended in favour of two Boeing 777-300ERs and 15 Boeing 737-800s instead, still subject to the pending IPO. Neither the plan nor the IPO were realised, to which the company cited unfavourable market conditions for a public offering.

=== Cooperation with Garuda Indonesia (2018–2019) ===
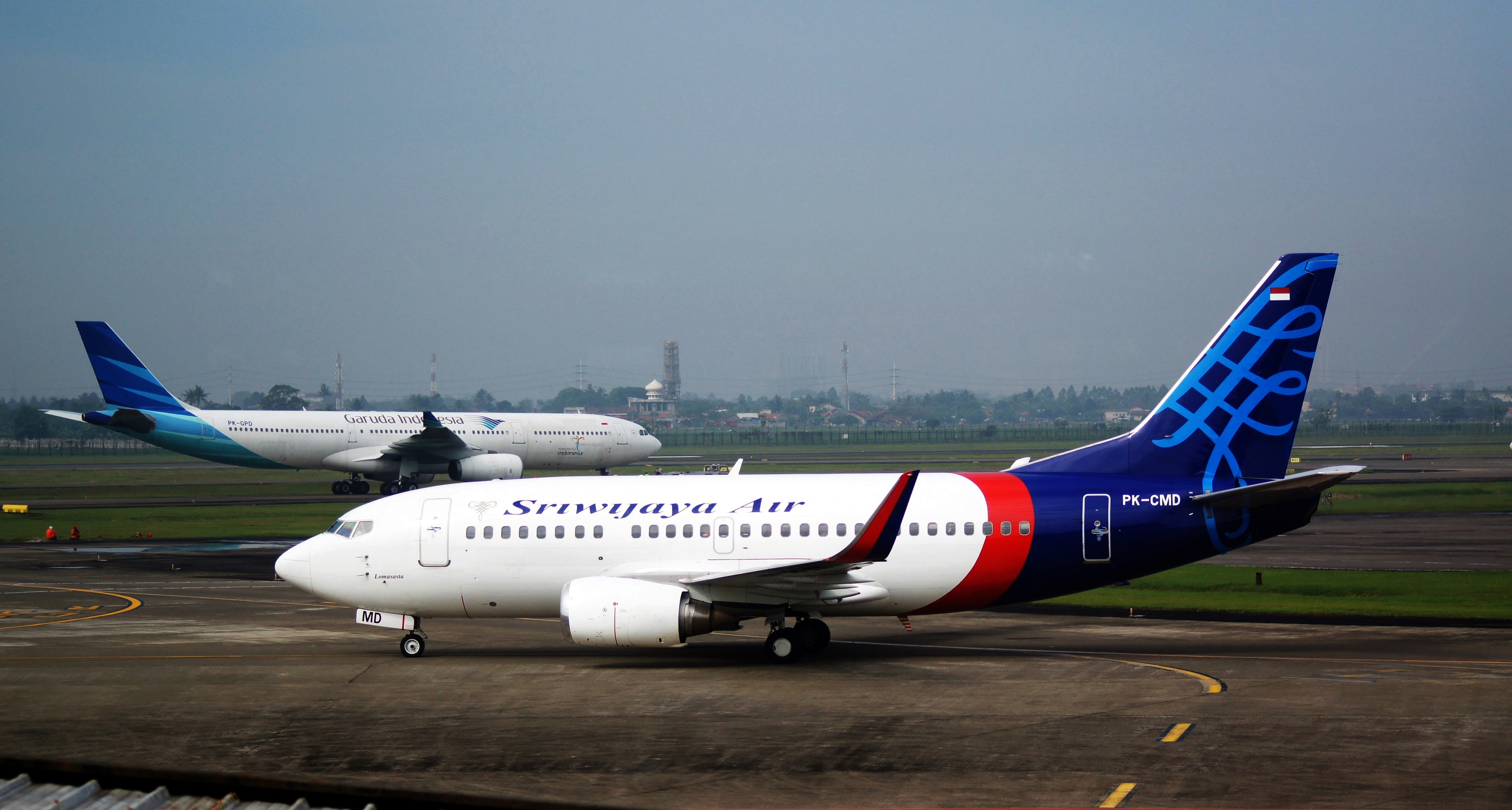
A Sriwijaya Air Boeing 737-500 with a Garuda Indonesia Airbus A330-300 at Soekarno Hatta Airport.

On 9 November 2018, Garuda Indonesia, through its subsidiary Citilink, took over operations as well as financial management of Sriwijaya Air with a Cooperation Agreement (KSO) mutually agreed upon by both airlines. The cooperation agreement had intended to rehabilitate and improve Sriwijaya Air's financial and operational performance and efficiency after significant losses the year prior. Under the agreement, both Sriwijaya Air and NAM Air would be operated as subsidiaries of Garuda Indonesia. The agreement between the two parties had also reportedly revolved around Sriwijaya Air's inability to fulfil obligations to pay its debt to GMF Aero Asia, Garuda Indonesia's aircraft maintenance subsidiary.

On 24 September 2019, the agreement broke down when GMF AeroAsia (Gaurda's MRO) declined Sriwijaya aircraft maintenance services and removed engines and parts from Sriwijaya Air aircraft due to the latter's inability to pay its debt to the former. The dispute caused Sriwijaya to announce mass cancellations of its flights and triggered a lawsuit from Citilink over the debt. The agreement came back into force on 1 October after the two parties resolved their disputes. The reconciliation proved to be short-lived when the Cooperation Agreement (KSO) between Garuda Indonesia and Sriwijaya Air was ultimately terminated on November 8, 2019. Garuda Indonesia alleged Sriwijaya's inability to pay its leasing dues to aircraft lessors and an outstanding debt amounting to Rp 2.02 trillion to Indonesian state-owned enterprises (including Garuda and its subsidiaries) to have marked the collapse of the agreement. The severance of the agreement triggered safety concerns from the Indonesian Directorate General of Civil Aviation which announced aircraft airworthiness inspections amid the concerns. Following the split, the Sriwijaya Air Group announced agreements new contractors for ground and maintenance services unrelated to Garuda Indonesia.

=== COVID-19 pandemic and financial difficulties (2021–present) ===
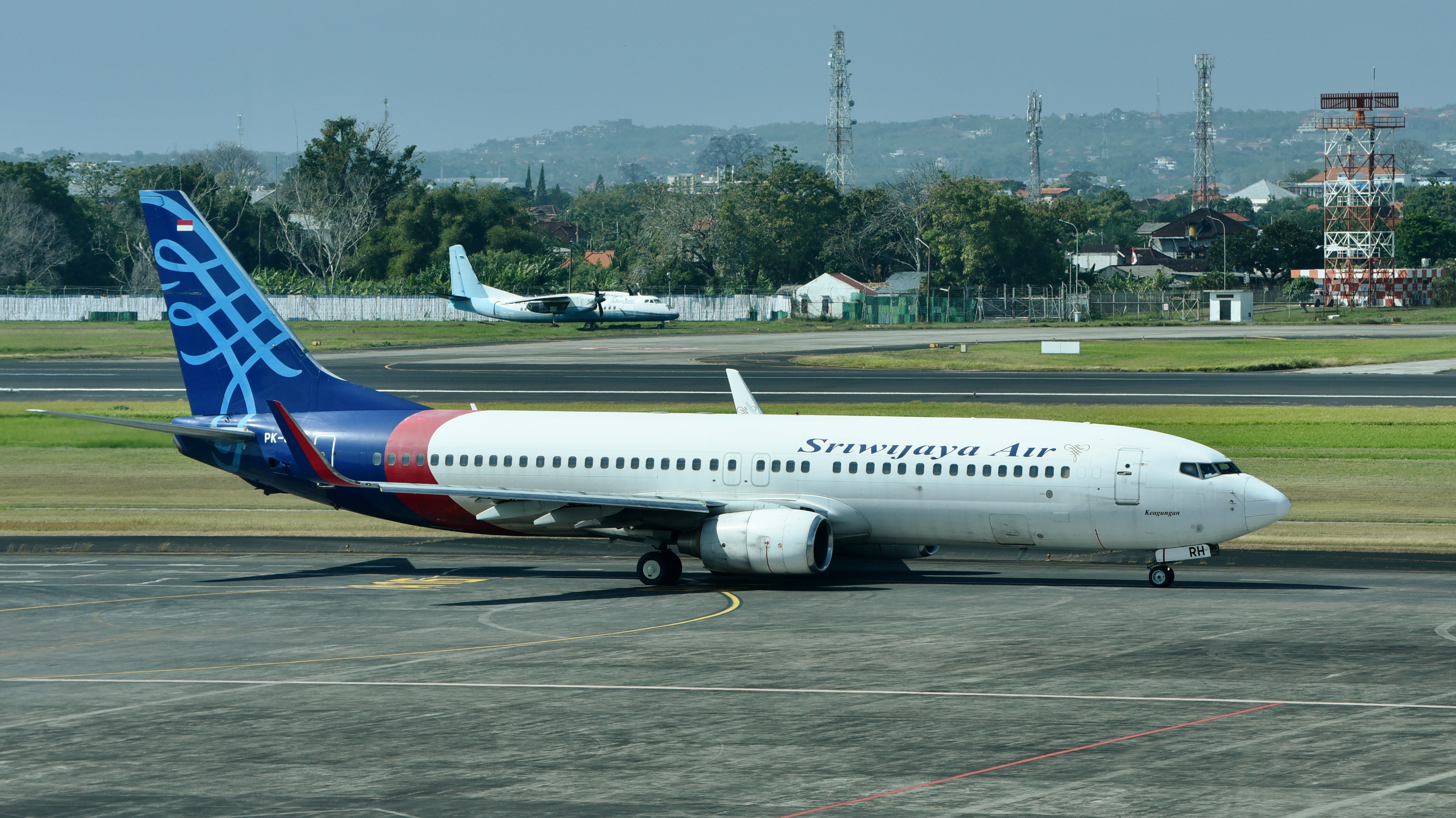
A Sriwijaya Air Boeing 737-800 at Ngurah Rai International Airport, Denpasar, Bali, in 2023

In 2021, amid financial difficulties intensified by the COVID-19 pandemic and the crash of Flight 182, the airline cut its workforce and offered its employees to resign. Following the cuts, the Indonesian Ministry of Labour opened an inquiry on the airline after it allegedly failed to pay severance payments to its former employees. In October 2022, the airline entered a temporary debt restructuring measure (PKPU) following a request from a creditor fulfilled by the Central Jakarta District Court.

== Subsidiaries ==
Sriwijaya Air has three subsidiaries and business arms:

- NAM Air - A feeder carrier for Sriwijaya Air
- National Aviation Management - a flying school based in Pangkal Pinang, also known as NAM Flying School.
- National Aircrew Management - Crew Training Centre based in Jakarta, next to Sriwijaya Air headquarters. Also known as NAM Training Center.

== Destinations ==
As of August 2025, Sriwijaya Air serves domestic and international destinations as part of its merged network with sister company NAM Air.

Country	City	Airport	Notes	Refs
China	Fuzhou	Fuzhou Changle International Airport	Terminated	
China	Hangzhou	Hangzhou Xiaoshan International Airport	Terminated	
China	Wenzhou	Wenzhou Longwan International Airport	Terminated	
East Timor	Dili	Presidente Nicolau Lobato International Airport	Terminated	
Indonesia	Ambon	Pattimura Airport	Terminated	
Indonesia	Balikpapan	Sultan Aji Muhammad Sulaiman Sepinggan Airport		
Indonesia	Banda Aceh	Sultan Iskandar Muda International Airport	Terminated	
Indonesia	Bandar Lampung	Radin Inten II Airport	Terminated	
Indonesia	Banjarmasin	Syamsudin Noor International Airport	Terminated	
Indonesia	Banyuwangi	Banyuwangi Airport	Terminated	
Indonesia	Batam	Hang Nadim International Airport		
Indonesia	Bengkulu	Fatmawati Soekarno Airport	Terminated	
Indonesia	Berau	Kalimarau Airport		
Indonesia	Biak	Frans Kaisiepo Airport		
Indonesia	Denpasar	Ngurah Rai International Airport		
Indonesia	Gorontalo	Djalaluddin Airport	Terminated	
Indonesia	Jakarta	Soekarno–Hatta International Airport	Base	
Indonesia	Jambi	Sultan Thaha Airport		
Indonesia	Jayapura	Sentani International Airport		
Indonesia	Kendari	Haluoleo Airport	Terminated	
Indonesia	Kupang	El Tari Airport	Terminated	
Indonesia	Labuan Bajo	Komodo International Airport	Terminated	
Indonesia	Langgur	Karel Sadsuitubun Airport	Terminated	
Indonesia	Lubuk Linggau	Silampari Airport	Terminated	
Indonesia	Luwuk	Syukuran Aminuddin Amir Airport	Terminated	
Indonesia	Makassar	Sultan Hasanuddin International Airport	Base	
Indonesia	Malang	Abdul Rachman Saleh Airport	Terminated	
Indonesia	Manado	Sam Ratulangi International Airport		
Indonesia	Manokwari	Rendani Airport	Terminated	
Indonesia	Mataram	Lombok International Airport	Terminated	
Indonesia	Medan	Kualanamu International Airport	Terminated	
Indonesia	Merauke	Mopah Airport	Terminated	
Indonesia	Morowali	Maleo Airport		
Indonesia	Nabire	Douw Aturure Airport		
Indonesia	Natuna	Ranai-Natuna Airport	Terminated	
Indonesia	Padang	Minangkabau International Airport	Terminated	
Indonesia	Palangkaraya	Tjilik Riwut Airport	Terminated	
Indonesia	Palembang	Sultan Mahmud Badaruddin II International Airport	Terminated	
Indonesia	Palu	Mutiara SIS Al-Jufrie Airport	Terminated	
Indonesia	Pangkal Pinang	Depati Amir Airport		
Indonesia	Pekanbaru	Sultan Syarif Kasim II International Airport	Terminated	
Indonesia	Pontianak	Supadio International Airport		
Indonesia	Poso	Kasiguncu Airport		
Indonesia	Raha	Sugimanuru Airport		
Indonesia	Semarang	Jenderal Ahmad Yani International Airport	Terminated	
Indonesia	Siborong-Borong	Raja Sisingamangaraja XII Airport	Terminated	
Indonesia	Sorong	Domine Eduard Osok Airport		
Indonesia	Surabaya	Juanda International Airport		
Indonesia	Surakarta	Adisoemarmo International Airport	Terminated	
Indonesia	Tanjung Pandan	H.A.S. Hanandjoeddin International Airport		
Indonesia	Tanjung Pinang	Raja Haji Fisabilillah Airport	Terminated	
Indonesia	Tambolaka	Lede Kalumbang Airport		
Indonesia	Tarakan	Juwata Airport	Terminated	
Indonesia	Ternate	Sultan Babullah Airport		
Indonesia	Timika	Mozes Kilangin Airport		
Indonesia	Waingapu	Umbu Mehang Kunda Airport	Terminated	
Indonesia	Wamena	Wamena Airport		
Indonesia	Yogyakarta	Adisutjipto Airport	Terminated	
Indonesia	Yogyakarta	Yogyakarta International Airport		
Malaysia	Kuala Lumpur	Kuala Lumpur International Airport	Terminated	
Malaysia	Penang	Penang International Airport	Terminated	

== Fleet ==
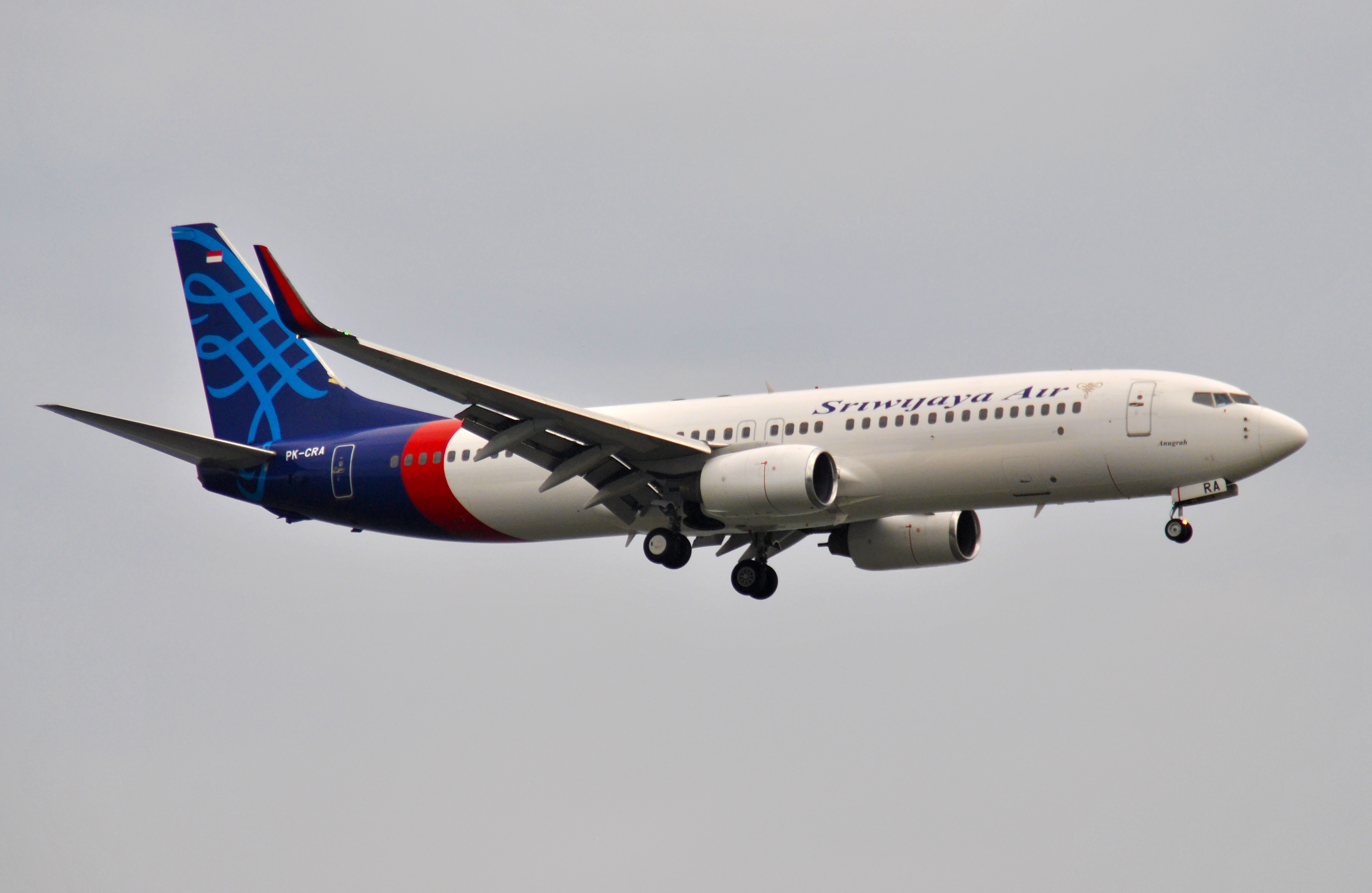
Sriwijaya Air Boeing 737-800NG

=== Current fleet ===
As of July 2026, Sriwijaya Air operates the following aircraft:

Aircraft	In service	On order	Passengers			Notes
Aircraft	In service	On order	C	Y	Total	Notes
Boeing 737-500	5	—	8	112	120	
Boeing 737-800	3	—	—	189	189	
Total	8	—				

=== Former fleet ===
As of August 2025, Sriwijaya Air operated 5 Boeing 737-500 and 4 Boeing 737-800.

Sriwijaya Air's former fleet also included the following aircraft:

Aircraft	Total	Introduced	Retired	Notes
Boeing 737-200	16	2004	2013	One crashed as Sriwijaya Air Flight 062
Boeing 737-300	13	2003	2019	
Boeing 737-400	7	2008	2016	
Boeing 737-500	14	2012	2021	One Crashed as Sriwijaya Air Flight 182
Boeing 737-800	23	2012	2023	
Boeing 737-900ER	2	2015	2022	

== Accidents and incidents ==
- 27 August 2008: Flight 062, a Boeing 737-200 (registered as PK-CJG) overran the runway at Sultan Thaha Airport, Jambi. There were 26 injuries and one fatality. The deceased was a farmer who was with his family in a hut sheltering from rain when it was struck by the plane.
- 20 December 2011: Flight 230, a Boeing 737-300 (registered as PK-CKM) was on encountered windshear on final approach and after touchdown veered off the runway while landing at Adisutjipto Airport, Yogyakarta. The aircraft managed to touch down, but could not stop in time. The aircraft came to a stop 25 meters past the runway end. The right main landing gear and nose gear collapsed, causing the right engine and wing to become substantially damaged. There were no fatalities and two passengers received minor injuries during the evacuation. The aircraft was written off and stored near a road in Bali.
- 1 June 2012: Flight 188, a Boeing 737-400 (registered as PK-CJV), operating a domestic flight from Jakarta to Pontianak veered off runway 15 during landing at Supadio International Airport in heavy rain. The aircraft, after aquaplaning on the drenched runway, came to stop left of the tarmac on soft ground on its belly (the nose gear collapsed and the main landing gear sank into the soft soil) and received substantial damage. No injuries occurred, the airport was temporarily closed as its single runway was blocked by the accident. On 2 June the aircraft was removed from the runway by the use of heavy cranes and the airport reopened for normal traffic.
- 13 October 2012: Flight 21, a Boeing 737-300 (registered as PK-CJT), was en route from Polonia International Airport, Medan, North Sumatra to Minangkabau International Airport, Padang, West Sumatra accidentally landed at Tabing Air Force Base, some 7 miles (12 km) away. None of the 96 passengers and 4 crew were injured. The pilot and co-pilot were suspended and subsequently questioned by the NTSC.
- 9 January 2021: Flight 182, a Boeing 737-500 (registered as PK-CLC) crashed near Laki Island, shortly after taking off from Jakarta Soekarno-Hatta Airport, killing all 62 people on board. The flight was bound for Pontianak Supadio Airport. The cause of the incident was found to be a faulty engine auto-throttle system that was not properly maintained by the airline, and pilot error in failing to properly monitor asymmetrical thrust conditions.

== See also ==
- NAM Air - Sriwijaya Air sister company
- List of airlines of Indonesia
