= Sultan Thaha Airport =

Sultan Thaha Airport Bandar Udara Sultan Thaha
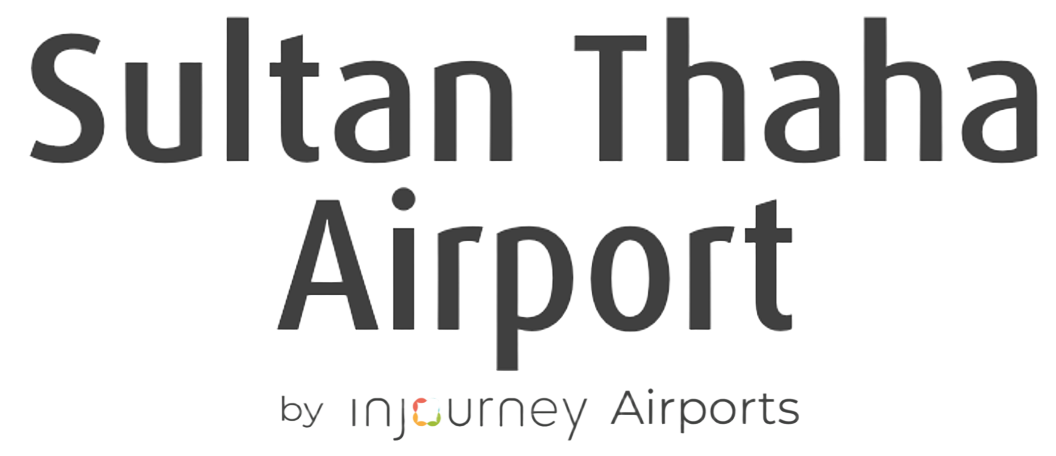

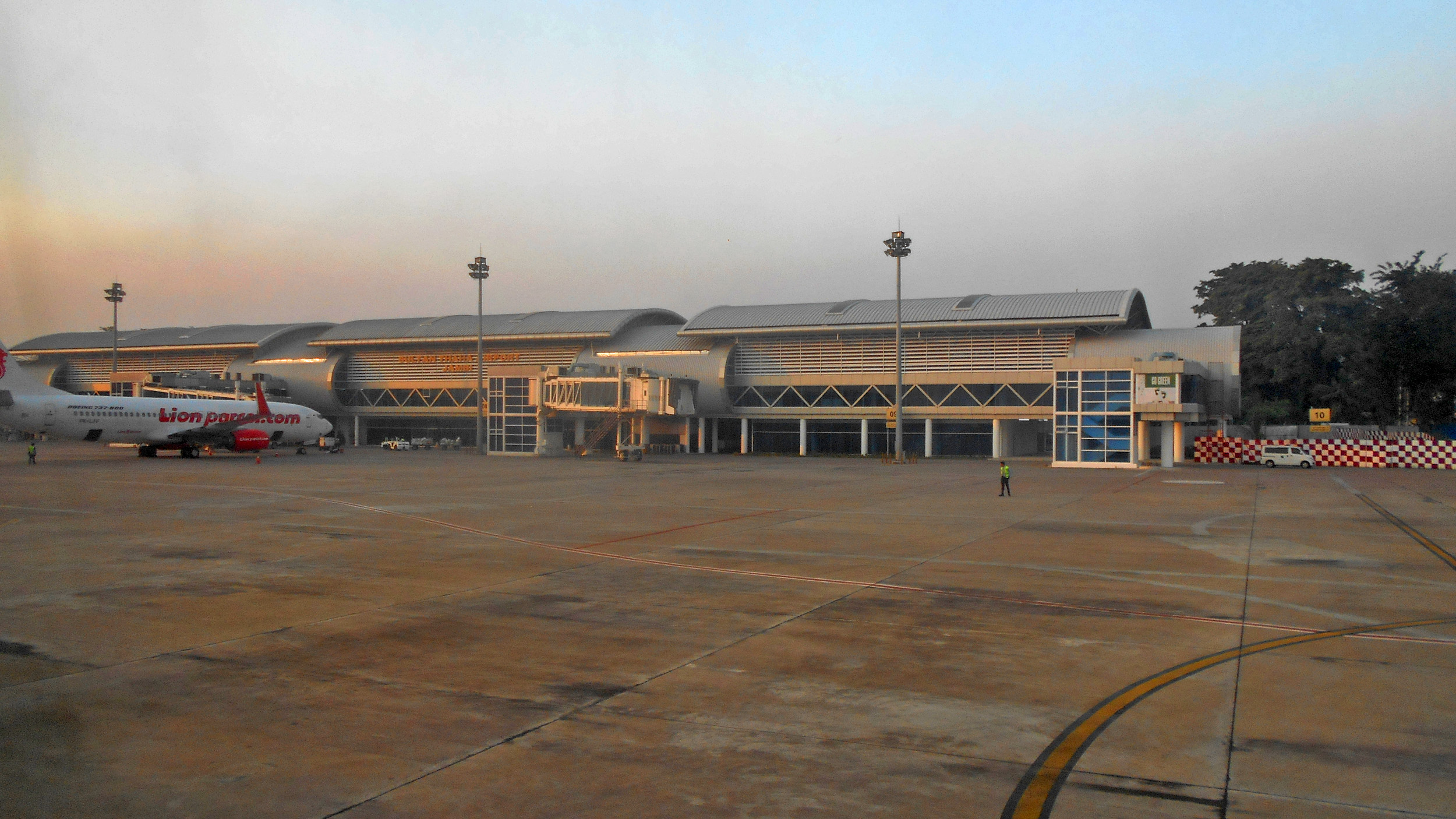
- IATA: DJB; ICAO: WIJJ; WMO: 96195

Summary
- Airport type: Public
- Owner: Government of Indonesia
- Operator: InJourney Airports
- Serves: Jambi City
- Location: Paalmerah, Jambi City, Jambi, Indonesia
- Time zone: WIB (UTC+07:00)
- Elevation AMSL: 82 ft (25 m)
- Coordinates: 01°38′17″S 103°38′40″E
- Website: www.sultanthaha-airport.co.id

Maps
- Sumatra region in Indonesia

- Location of airport in Sumatra DJB (Indonesia)

Runways
| Direction | Length | | Surface |
| Direction | m | ft | Surface |
|---|---|---|---|
| 13/31 | 2,602 | 8,537 | Asphalt |

Statistics (2024)
- Passengers: 1,005,277 (▲1.8%)
- Cargo (tonnes): 3,533 (▲2.2%)
- Aircraft movements: 8,336 (▲1.4%)
- Source: DGCA

Sultan Thaha Airport (IATA: DJB, ICAO: WIJJ), formerly known as Paalmerah Airport, is a domestic airport serving Jambi, the provincial capital of Jambi Province, Indonesia. Located in the Paalmerah suburb of Jambi, the airport is named after Thaha Syaifuddin (1816–1904), the last Sultan of Jambi and a national hero of Indonesia, and is located about 7.2 km (4.5 miles) from the Jambi city center. Serving as the primary gateway to Jambi and its surrounding regions, the airport provides vital connections to major cities in western Indonesia such as Jakarta, Batam, Medan, and Yogyakarta, while also supporting regional flights to nearby cities and towns within Jambi Province. The airport has previously served as a departure point for Hajj pilgrims traveling to Mecca and also operated seasonal flights to Jeddah for the same purpose. Additionally, there were plans to launch international flights to Malaysia and Singapore, although these have yet to materialize.

== History ==
=== Construction and early history ===
Sultan Thaha Airport was originally constructed in 1940 by the Dutch colonial government and was initially named Paalmerah Airport. The name Paalmerah was derived from a boundary marker (a stone peg) used by the Dutch to delineate the airport's perimeter, which was later painted red. The airfield was attacked and captured by Japanese forces on 15 February 1942 as part of the Dutch East Indies campaign in the Pacific Theater of World War II. Following its capture, the Japanese expanded the airfield and strengthened its defenses by constructing fortifications and bunkers, some of which still survive today.

During the Indonesian National Revolution, the airfield was used by the Indonesian Air Force as a logistics base, primarily providing fuel supplies for military and civilian aircraft operated by the Republicans. On December 29, 1948, at the beginning of Operation Kraai, Dutch fighter aircraft attacked Paalmerah Airfield, causing extensive damage. The Dutch subsequently carried out a paratrooper drop around the airfield and captured the area within hours. Outnumbered and poorly equipped, Indonesian Air Force cadets stationed at the airfield retreated into the interior of Jambi to avoid capture by Dutch forces.

Following Dutch recognition of Indonesia's independence in 1949, the airport came under the operation of the Directorate General of Civil Aviation under the Ministry of Transportation in the 1950s. At that time, the runway measured 900 meters by 25 meters and was surfaced with gravel, accommodating aircraft such as the Douglas DC-3. The Jambi Provincial Government began plans to upgrade and develop the airport, including the construction of aircraft refueling facilities and the extension and improvement of the runway to accommodate larger aircraft such as the Fokker F27 Friendship and Lockheed L-188 Electra.

In 1978, Paalmerah Airport was renamed Sultan Thaha Airport, in honor of Thaha Syaifuddin—the last Sultan of Jambi and a recognized national hero of Indonesia—who resisted Dutch colonial rule in Jambi and was ultimately killed by Dutch forces in 1904. Following the renaming, significant expansions were undertaken at the airport. In 1978, Runway Visual Aid Lights, including VASI, CCR, and REILS, were installed. The runway was subsequently upgraded again, enabling the airport to accommodate larger aircraft such as the Fokker F28 Fellowship.

=== Contemporary history ===
In 1991, the runway was extended to 1,800 m × 30 m (5,906 ft × 98 ft) to accommodate larger aircraft and meet growing passenger demand and increasing air traffic. As the airport continued to develop, additional lighting systems were installed in preparation for expanded operations in 1998. In 2000, the runway was extended again to 2,000 m × 30 m (6,562 ft × 98 ft). In 2005, the airport's VASI (Visual Approach Slope Indicator) system was replaced with a PAPI (Precision Approach Path Indicator) system as part of efforts to modernize its navigational aids.

On 1 January 2007, management of Sultan Thaha Airport was transferred from the Directorate General of Civil Aviation to Angkasa Pura II, now known as InJourney Airports. At around this time, the airport began accommodating larger narrow-body aircraft, such as the Airbus A320. Following the transfer of management, plans for further expansion were developed, including an extension of the runway to 2,220 m × 30 m (7,283 ft × 98 ft).

Sultan Thaha Airport was planned to become the world's first zoo airport in 2015, integrating the airport with the nearby Taman Rimba Zoo, located approximately 900 metres from the new terminal. The airport was designed with an animal-themed concept. However, the construction of an access road to the airport required part of the zoo's land, reducing its area to 13 hectares. Under regulations issued by the Ministry of Forestry, a zoo was required to cover at least 15 hectares; facilities smaller than this threshold were instead classified as Taman Satwa (Animal Park).

Proposals have been made to designate the airport as an international airport and establish regular international services to destinations in Singapore, Malaysia, and China, as well as Saudi Arabia. The airport has previously handled seasonal flights to Jeddah in Saudi Arabia to transport Hajj pilgrims.

== Facilities and development ==
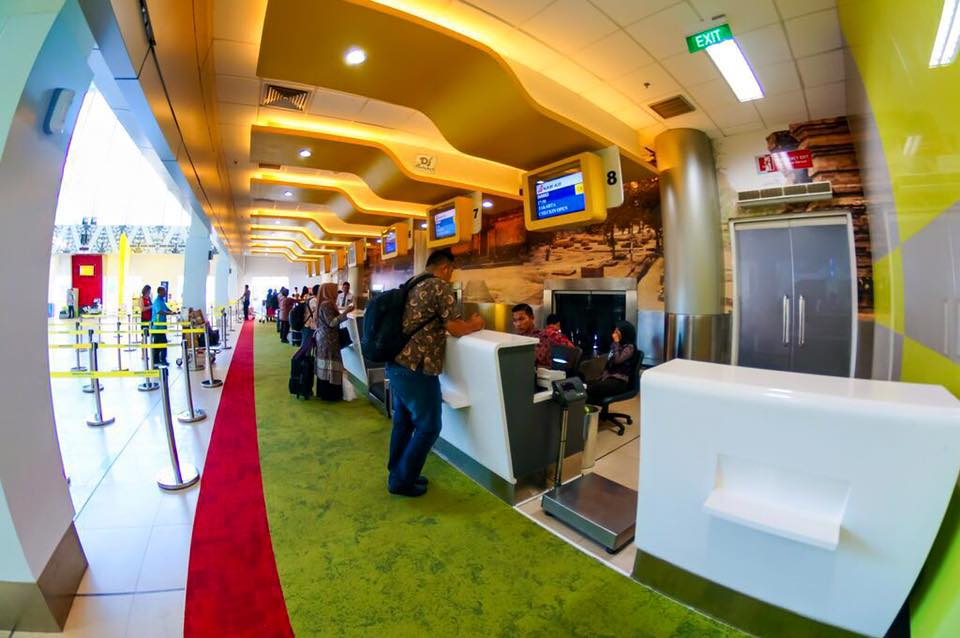
Check-in area

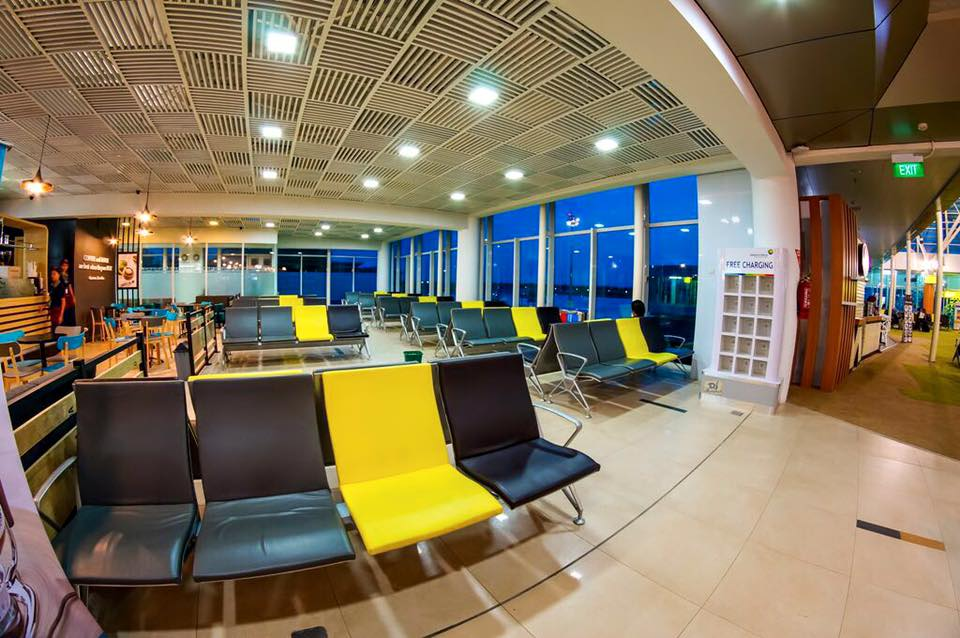
Boarding gate

In 2012, the runway was expanded to 2,400 meters in length and 45 meters in width, which was further extended to 2,600 meters. This upgrade allowed the airport to accommodate larger aircraft, increasing its capacity from Boeing 737s to aircraft of similar size to the Boeing 757. Additionally, an Instrument Landing System (ILS) was set to be installed to improve landing precision, particularly in adverse weather conditions.

On 12 December 2011, the groundbreaking ceremony for the first phase of the terminal expansion took place, aiming to increase capacity to 1.6 million passengers per year. At the time, the terminal had a capacity of only 300,000 passengers per year, while actual passenger numbers had already reached 1 million. The expansion increased the terminal's size from 2,308 square meters to 13,015 square meters. The new terminal was officially inaugurated on 27 December 2015. It was equipped with two jet bridges and designed to accommodate up to 1.8 million passengers annually. The second phase of expansion was inaugurated by President Joko Widodo on 21 July 2016. This phase included a 10-centimeter runway overlay and an increase in terminal size to 35,000 square meters. Covering an area of 35,000 square meters, the terminal is complemented by a 26,500-square-meter parking area with a capacity for 436 cars and 415 motorcycles. The total cost of construction for the passenger terminal and parking facilities amounted to approximately Rp 126 billion. Additionally, Rp 110 billion was allocated for the apron expansion, 16 billion rupiah for the construction of the control tower and operations building, and Rp 67 billion for the development of basic infrastructure and other supporting facilities.

Another expansion was completed in 2019, involving the enlargement of the passenger terminal and the addition of two more jet bridges, bringing the total to four. The terminal's capacity was increased to 2.6 million passengers per year to accommodate growing demand. The apron was also expanded from 38,000 to 46,500 square meters, allowing it to accommodate up to 13 aircraft. The total cost of expanding both airside and landside facilities was approximately 303 billion rupiah.

=== New airport ===
Due to limited land available for further expansion, particularly the inability to extend the existing runway, the Jambi Provincial Government began planning the construction of a larger airport to replace Sultan Thaha Airport. Several potential sites have been considered, including locations in Muaro Jambi Regency and East Tanjung Jabung Regency. Muaro Jambi Regency has emerged as the leading candidate, with three potential sites identified within the regency. Among them, the site in Kumpeh District has been considered the leading option. The new airport is planned to be equipped with a longer runway, allowing the airport to accommodate larger aircraft and serve as a Hajj embarkation point, enabling direct Hajj flights to Saudi Arabia and eliminating the need for pilgrims to transit through Batam.

== Airlines and destinations ==
=== Passenger ===
| Airlines | Destinations |
|---|---|
| Batik Air | Jakarta–Soekarno-Hatta, Medan |
| Citilink | Jakarta–Soekarno-Hatta |
| Garuda Indonesia | Jakarta–Soekarno-Hatta |
| Sriwijaya Air | Batam, Jakarta–Soekarno-Hatta |
| Super Air Jet | Batam, Jakarta–Soekarno-Hatta, Yogyakarta–International |
| Susi Air | Dabo, Sungai Penuh |

== Statistics ==
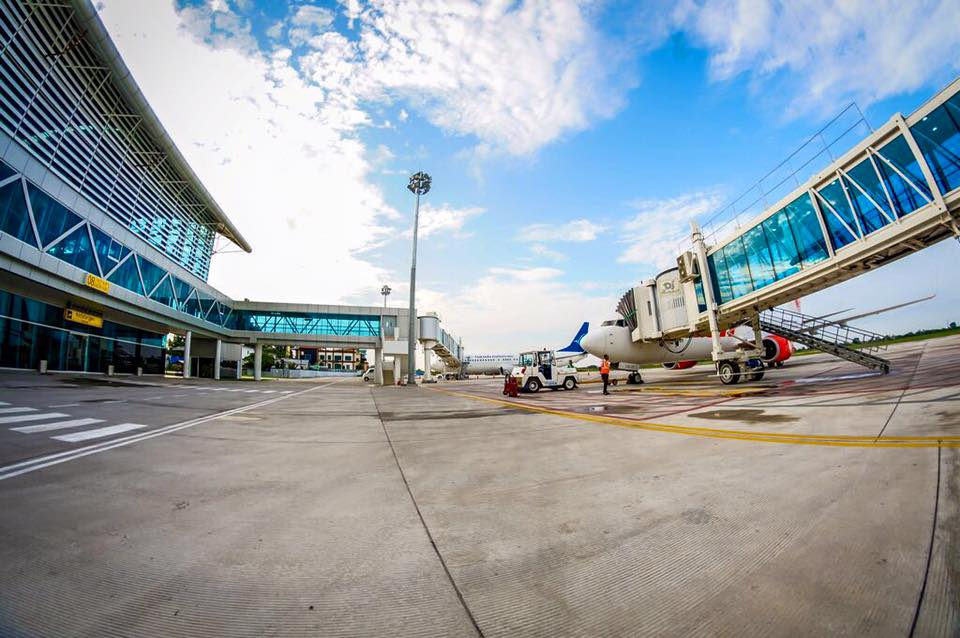
Apron view of the airport

Annual passenger numbers and aircraft statistics
| Year | Passengers handled | Passenger % change | Cargo (tonnes) | Cargo % change | Aircraft movements | Aircraft % change |
|---|---|---|---|---|---|---|
| 2006 | 669,557 | Steady | 3,504 | Steady | 6,990 | Steady |
| 2007 | 679,322 | ▲1.5 | 3,580 | ▲2.2 | 6,459 | ▼7.6 |
| 2008 | 670,366 | ▼1.3 | 4,417 | ▲23.4 | 6,194 | ▼4.1 |
| 2009 | 805,136 | ▲20.1 | 4,349 | ▼1.5 | 6,786 | ▲9.6 |
| 2010 | 936,286 | ▲16.3 | 5,244 | ▲20.6 | 8,157 | ▲20.2 |
| 2011 | 1,014,983 | ▲8.4 | 6,116 | ▲16.6 | 7,857 | ▼3.7 |
| 2012 | 1,117,909 | ▲10.1 | 5,529 | ▼9.6 | 7,416 | ▼5.6 |
| 2013 | 1,282,244 | ▲14.7 | 6,547 | ▲18.4 | 7,640 | ▲3.0 |
| 2014 | 1,316,379 | ▲2.7 | 7,261 | ▲10.9 | 9,706 | ▲27.0 |
| 2015 | 1,168,219 | ▼11.3 | 6,088 | ▼16.2 | 9,486 | ▼2.3 |
| 2016 | 1,636,873 | ▲40.1 | 7,111 | ▲16.8 | 13,636 | ▲43.7 |
| 2017 | 1,757,085 | ▲7.3 | 9,110 | ▲28.1 | 17,404 | ▲27.6 |
| 2018 | 1,785,742 | ▲1.6 | 9,467 | ▲3.9 | 17,322 | ▼0.5 |
| 2019 | 1,395,842 | ▼21.8 | 8,544 | ▼9.7 | 15,332 | ▼11.5 |
| 2020 | 557,826 | ▼60.0 | 5,276 | ▼38.2 | 7,841 | ▼48.9 |
| 2021 | 430,287 | ▼22.9 | 3,718 | ▼29.5 | 5,637 | ▼28.1 |
| 2022 | 834,542 | ▲94.0 | 3,958 | ▲6.5 | 7,332 | ▲30.1 |
| 2023 | 987,673 | ▲18.3 | 3,458 | ▼12.6 | 8,220 | ▲12.1 |
| 2024 | 1,005,277 | ▲1.8 | 3,533 | ▲2.2 | 8,336 | ▲1.4 |
^{Source: DGCA, BPS}

== Accidents and incidents ==
- On 27 August 2008, Sriwijaya Air Flight 62, a Boeing 737-200, overran the runway. Eleven people were injured, and although there were no initial fatalities, a farmer struck by the aircraft on the ground later died from his injuries.
- On April 11, 2025, Lion Air Flight 603, operating a Boeing 737-900ER, was unable to take off due to its wheel becoming stuck on the runway's asphalt. The cause of the incident was traced to a deformation in the runway's surface. Consequently, the airport was closed for two hours, leading to the diversion of all incoming flights.
