= InJourney Airports =

Indonesian airport company

PT Angkasa Pura Indonesia
- Trade name: InJourney Airports
- Formerly: PT Angkasa Pura I (1992–2024); PT Angkasa Pura II (1992–2024)
- Type: State-owned limited company
- Industry: Transport (Airport authority)
- Founded: 1 July 2024
- Founder: Government of Indonesia
- Headquarters: InJourney Airports Center, Soekarno–Hatta International Airport, Tangerang, Indonesia
- Area served: Indonesia
- Key people: Maya Watono (CEO)
- Services: Oversees operations of airports in Indonesia
- Revenue: Rp. 900 billion (USD 54,347,850) (2024)
- Owner: Danantara
- Parent: PT Aviasi Pariwisata Indonesia (InJourney)
- Website: www.injourneyairports.id

PT Angkasa Pura Indonesia, trading as InJourney Airports, is the state-owned enterprise responsible for the management of airports in Indonesia. It was established in July 2024 through the merger of two companies named "Angkasa Pura" (Sanskrit for 'Sky City'): Angkasa Pura I, which previously managed airports in central and eastern Indonesia, and Angkasa Pura II, which oversaw airports in western Indonesia. The company is headquartered at Soekarno–Hatta International Airport, Tangerang, which was formerly the office of Angkasa Pura II. InJourney Airports handles a total of 172 million passengers annually, ranking as the fifth-largest airport operator in the world, surpassing Vinci Airports in France and GMR Group in India. As of 2025, the company manages 37 airports across Indonesia.

== History ==
The history of Angkasa Pura traces back to President Sukarno’s vision of developing world-class airports in Indonesia. To realize this goal, Perusahaan Negara (PN) Angkasa Pura Kemayoran was established on 20 February 1962, with the responsibility of managing Kemayoran Airport in Jakarta, the country's first international airport. After two years of operation, PN Angkasa Pura Kemayoran assumed full control of the airport's assets and operations from the Ministry of Transportation on 20 February 1964. On 17 May 1965, the name PN Angkasa Pura Kemayoran was changed to Perusahaan Negara (PN) Angkasa Pura. The company gradually expanded its operations by managing airports in major Indonesian cities such as Denpasar, Medan, Surabaya, Balikpapan, and Makassar.

In 1974, PN Angkasa Pura was converted into a public corporation (Perusahaan Umum or Perum). Kemayoran Airport ceased operations in 1985, and Soekarno-Hatta International Airport, then known as Cengkareng Airport, replaced Jakarta's Kemayoran Airport as Indonesia's main international gateway. Consequently, Perum Angkasa Pura II was established to manage both Soekarno-Hatta International Airport and Halim Perdanakusuma International Airport. A year later, Perum Angkasa Pura was then renamed to Perum Angkasa Pura I. Over time, the operational scope of both companies became more defined, with Angkasa Pura I responsible for managing airports in central and eastern Indonesia, while Angkasa Pura II primarily oversaw airports in western Indonesia.

Between 1992 and 1993, Perum Angkasa Pura I was transformed into a limited company (Perseroan Terbatas or PT) with full ownership by the government of Indonesia. The company was officially renamed PT Angkasa Pura I (Persero) on 24 April 1993. Later, on 13 January 2022, the company underwent another name change, reverting to PT Angkasa Pura I.

In October 2021, the government officially transferred the majority of Angkasa Pura I and Angkasa Pura II's shares to Aviasi Pariwisata Indonesia (Injourney) as part of efforts to establish a state-owned aviation and tourism holding company. In July 2024, InJourney Airports was officially launched which is resulted from the merging of both Angkasa Pura I and Angkasa Pura II as part of efforts to form an internal subholding within InJourney specializing in airport management. The company then transferred the majority of its shares in PT Angkasa Pura Hotel and PT Angkasa Pura Properti to Injourney Aviation Services.

Following its founding, InJourney Airports has pursued expansion through strategic joint ventures. For instance, in October 2024, InJourney Airports and Incheon International Airport Corporation (IIAC) signed an MOU to establish a joint venture aimed at operating airports in Asia and the Middle East, including locations in Kuwait, Uzbekistan, and the Philippines. Prior to this, the two companies had already collaborated in operating Hang Nadim International Airport in Batam.

== Operations ==
As of 2025, the company manages 37 airports across Indonesia, divided into six regions. Region I includes Banten, Jakarta, and West Java; Region II covers the Lesser Sunda Islands and some parts of East Java; Region III encompasses Sumatra; Region IV includes Central Java, Yogyakarta and most parts of East Java; Region V consists of Sulawesi, Maluku, and Western New Guinea; and Region VI covers Kalimantan. Each of these regions is responsible for managing its own set of airports. Below is the list of the airports operated in each region.

Region I

1. Halim Perdanakusuma International Airport, East Jakarta, Jakarta
2. Husein Sastranegara Airport, Bandung, West Java
3. Kertajati International Airport, Majalengka, West Java
4. Soekarno–Hatta International Airport, Tangerang, Banten

Region II

1. Banyuwangi Airport, Banyuwangi, East Java
2. El Tari International Airport, Kupang, East Nusa Tenggara
3. I Gusti Ngurah Rai International Airport, Denpasar, Bali
4. Lombok International Airport, Mataram, West Nusa Tenggara

Region III

1. Depati Amir Airport, Pangkal Pinang, Bangka Belitung Islands
2. Fatmawati Soekarno Airport, Bengkulu
3. Hang Nadim International Airport, Batam, Riau Islands
4. H.A.S. Hanandjoeddin International Airport, Tanjung Pandan, Bangka Belitung Islands
5. Kualanamu International Airport, Medan, North Sumatra
6. Minangkabau International Airport, Padang, West Sumatra
7. Radin Inten II International Airport, Lampung
8. Raja Haji Fisabilillah Airport, Tanjung Pinang, Riau Islands
9. Raja Sisingamangaraja XII Airport, Siborong-Borong, North Sumatra
10. Sultan Iskandar Muda International Airport, Banda Aceh, Aceh
11. Sultan Mahmud Badaruddin II International Airport, Palembang, South Sumatra
12. Sultan Syarif Kasim II International Airport, Pekanbaru, Riau
13. Sultan Thaha Airport, Jambi

Region IV

1. Adisutjipto Airport, Yogyakarta, Special Region of Yogyakarta
2. Adisoemarmo International Airport, Solo, Central Java
3. Dhoho Airport, Kediri, East Java
4. Jenderal Besar Sudirman Airport, Purbalingga, Central Java
5. Jenderal Ahmad Yani International Airport, Semarang, Central Java
6. Juanda International Airport, Surabaya, East Java
7. Yogyakarta International Airport, Kulon Progo, Special Region of Yogyakarta

Region V

1. Frans Kaisiepo Airport, Biak, Papua
2. Pattimura Airport, Ambon, Maluku
3. Sam Ratulangi International Airport, Manado, North Sulawesi
4. Sentani International Airport, Jayapura, Papua
5. Sultan Hasanuddin International Airport, Makassar, South Sulawesi

Region VI

1. Supadio International Airport, Pontianak, West Kalimantan
2. Sultan Aji Muhammad Sulaiman Sepinggan Airport, Balikpapan, East Kalimantan
3. Syamsudin Noor Airport, Banjarbaru, South Kalimantan
4. Tjilik Riwut Airport, Palangka Raya, Central Kalimantan
