= General Sudirman Airport =

Airport in Purbalingga, Central Java, Indonesia

Jenderal Besar Soedirman Airport Bandar Udara Jenderal Besar Soedirman
- IATA: PWL; ICAO: WAHP

Summary
- Airport type: Public / Military
- Owner: Indonesian Government
- Operator: InJourney Airports
- Serves: Purbalingga
- Location: Bukateja, Purbalingga, Indonesia
- Time zone: WIB (UTC+07:00)
- Elevation AMSL: 160 ft (49 m)
- Coordinates: 07°27′42″S 109°25′00″E

Map
- Location of airport in Java

Runways
Direction	Length		Surface
Direction	ft	m	Surface
10/28	5,249	1,600	Asphalt

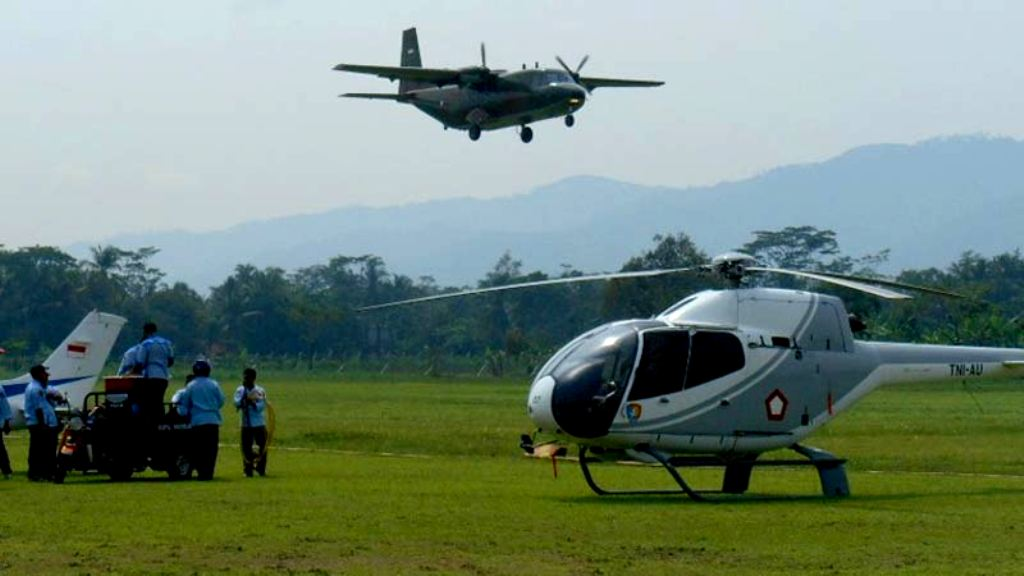
Indonesian Air Force Casa C-212 Aviocar landing at Wirasaba Airport

Jenderal Besar Soedirman Airport (Indonesian: Bandar Udara Jenderal Besar Soedirman), also known as JB Soedirman Airport (IATA: PWL, ICAO: WAHP) is an airport located in Bukateja, Purbalingga, Indonesia.

The site used to be an Indonesian Air force airfield, serving civil aviation since 2007. The base was officially renamed in 2016 after General Sudirman, who is a National Hero of Indonesia. The airport serves 6 regencies: Banyumas Regency, Purbalingga Regency, Banjarnegara Regency, Kebumen Regency, Wonosobo Regency and Pemalang Regency. Operation started on June 1, 2021 and the first commercial flight was on June 3. The airport is operated by PT Angkasa Pura II.

As of 2025, there are no scheduled flights and the Government of Purbalingga Regency will planned to reactivate the airport.

== Facilities ==
Around 850 meters of existing grass airstrip was extended with hard pavement for the development of the airport. The airport will have a total area of 115 hectares. The runway extends 1,600 x 30 metres, aided by an apron of 69 x 103 metres, and a taxiway 15 metres in width, which was finished in early 2021. The airport can accommodate a twin-propeller aircraft such as ATR 72-600 models. Since the planned permanent structure of the terminal building is still under construction, a 20 x 20 metre, high-grade pole tent was built to serve as temporary terminal, complete with air conditioning and plumbing.
