= Depati Amir Airport =

Airport in Pangkalpinang, Bangka Belitung Islands, Indonesia

Depati Amir Airport Bandar Udara Depati Amir
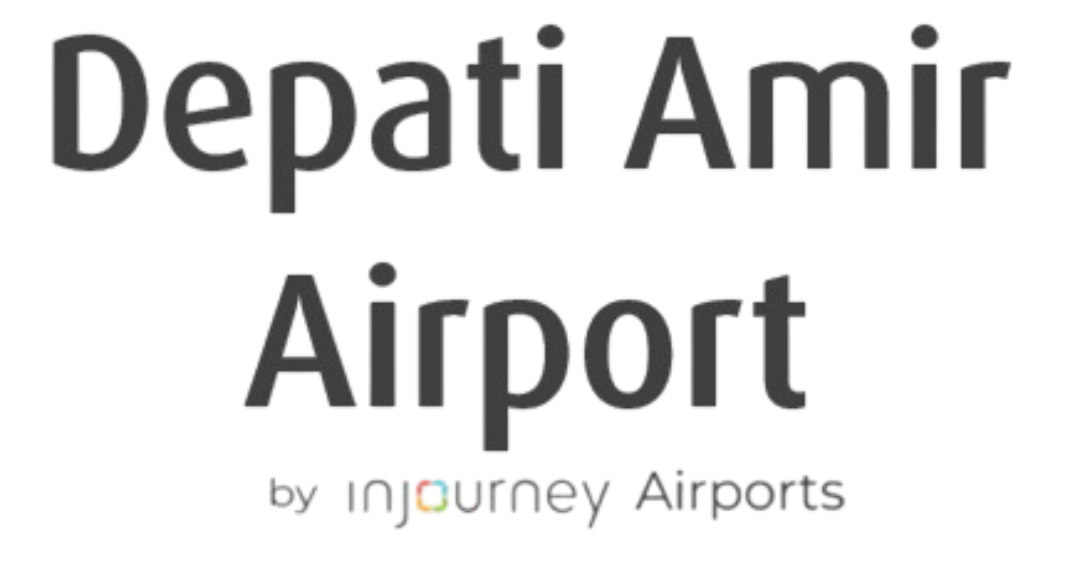

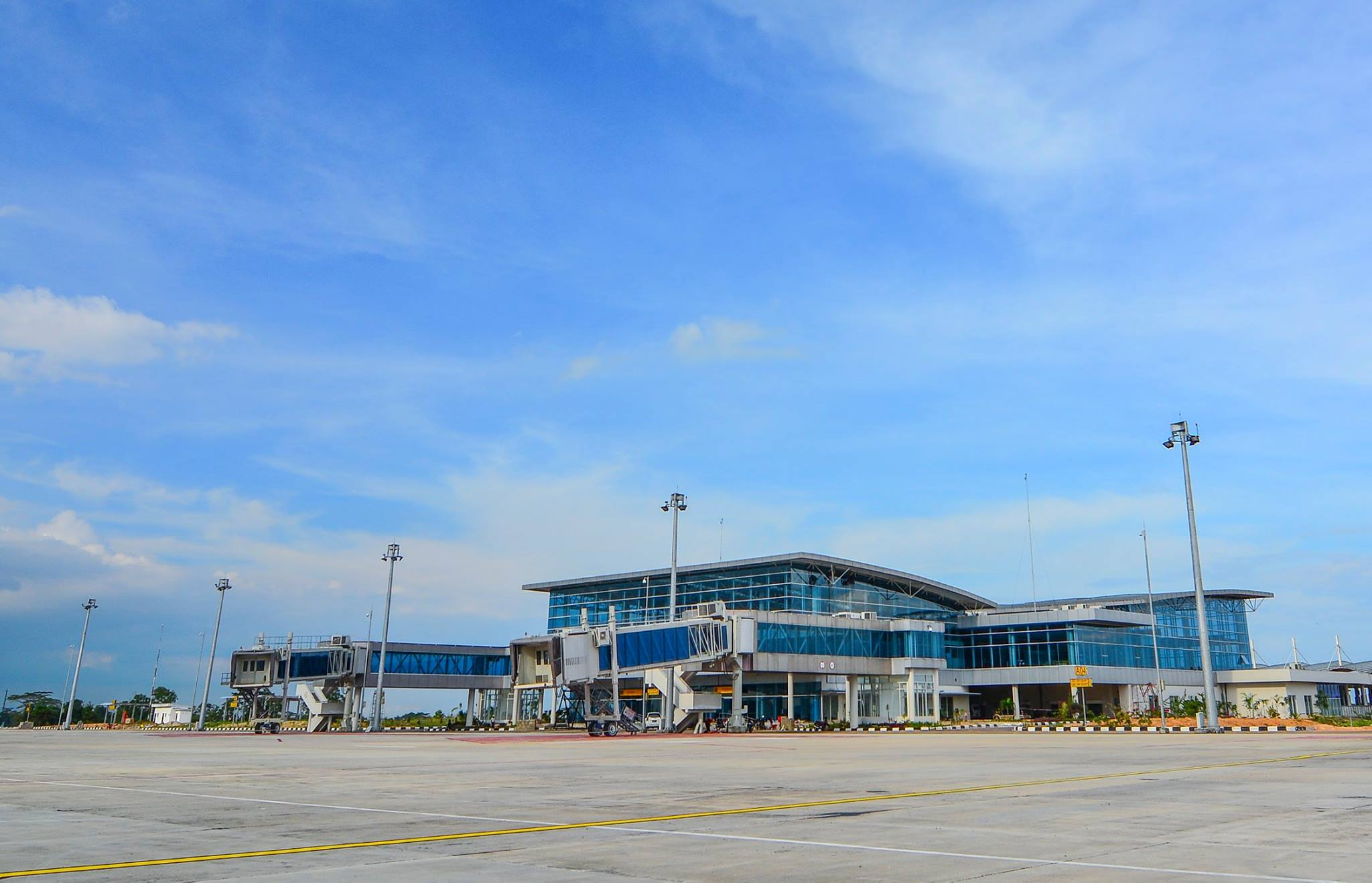
- IATA: PGK; ICAO: WIKK; WMO: 96237

Summary
- Airport type: Public
- Owner: Government of Indonesia
- Operator: InJourney Airports
- Serves: Pangkalpinang
- Location: Pangkalan Baru District, Central Bangka Regency, Bangka, Bangka Belitung Islands, Indonesia
- Opened: 1942; 84 years ago
- Focus city for: Sriwijaya Air
- Time zone: WIB (UTC+07:00)
- Elevation AMSL: 108 ft (33 m)
- Coordinates: 02°09′43″S 106°08′20″E
- Website: www.depatiamir-airport.co.id

Map
- Location in Sumatra Location in Indonesia

Runways
Direction	Length		Surface
Direction	m	ft	Surface
16/34	2,600	8,530	Asphalt

Statistics (2024)
- Passengers: 1,219,122 (▼7.3%)
- Cargo (tonnes): 10,354 (▲12.7%)
- Aircraft movements: 10,478 (▲2.6%)
- Source: DGCA

Depati Amir Airport (IATA: PGK, ICAO: WIKK), also known as Pangkalpinang Airport, is a domestic airport serving Pangkalpinang, the provincial capital and largest city of Bangka-Belitung Islands province, Indonesia. It is the only airport on Bangka Island and one of two airports in the Bangka-Belitung province, the other being H.A.S. Hanandjoeddin International Airport in Belitung. While the airport serves Pangkalpinang, it is not located within the city limits but rather in Pangkalan Baru District, Central Bangka Regency, approximately 5 km (3.1 miles) from the Pangkalpinang city center. The airport is named after Depati Amir, a Bangka aristocrat and national hero of Indonesia. Serving as the primary gateway to Pangkalpinang and the island of Bangka, the airport offers connections to several major cities across Indonesia, including Jakarta, Batam, Palembang, and Yogyakarta.

== History ==
=== Construction and early history ===
Former terminal of Depati Amir Airport, used until 2017

In 1942, following their victory over the Dutch, the Japanese occupied Bangka as part of the Pacific Theater of World War II. To support their military operations against the Allied forces and strengthen the island's defenses, they constructed an airstrip to serve as a base for their aircraft. Initially, the airstrip was not intended for commercial or civilian flights; rather, it functioned as a strategic military installation designed to protect against potential Allied attacks. During the war, the Japanese constructed bunkers and other fortifications around the airport for defense and to stockpile weapons. Some of these structures can still be seen today.

After the Japanese surrender in 1945, the Dutch took control of the airfield. However, local Bangkanese forces rebelled against the Dutch and subsequently drove them out following a battle. The airfield was eventually recaptured by the Dutch and witnessed the arrival of President Sukarno on 22 December 1948, accompanied by his entourage from Yogyakarta, marking the beginning of his exile in Bangka following his capture by Dutch forces. He remained in exile in Bangka until 7 July 1949, when he was released by the Dutch and departed from the airport aboard an aircraft provided by the United Nations Commission for Indonesia (UNCI).

Following the Dutch recognition of Indonesian sovereignty in 1949, the Indonesian government began planning upgrades and further development of the airport. These plans included improving the runway to accommodate larger aircraft, such as the Convair aircraft. At the time, the airport had a 1,307 m × 45 m (4,288 ft × 148 ft) runway, which the government planned to extend to 1,520 m (4,987 ft). By the 1970s, Merpati Nusantara Airlines had begun operating commercial flights to Palembang in South Sumatra using the de Havilland Canada DHC-6 Twin Otter.

In the early 1980s, the airport underwent further upgrades, including the extension of the runway to accommodate larger aircraft such as the Fokker F28, as well as the installation of a DVOR and runway lighting. These improvements enabled Garuda Indonesia to begin operating direct commercial flights from Jakarta to Pangkalpinang using the Fokker F28. At the time, Garuda Indonesia also began operating the Pangkalpinang–Palembang route, with up to 10 flights per week, while Deraya Air Taxi launched a thrice-weekly Pangkalpinang–Tanjungpandan route on Belitung Island using the CASA C-212 Aviocar. The airport was subsequently planned for further development, with the upgrades expected to enable it to accommodate larger aircraft such as the Douglas DC-9.

=== Contemporary history ===
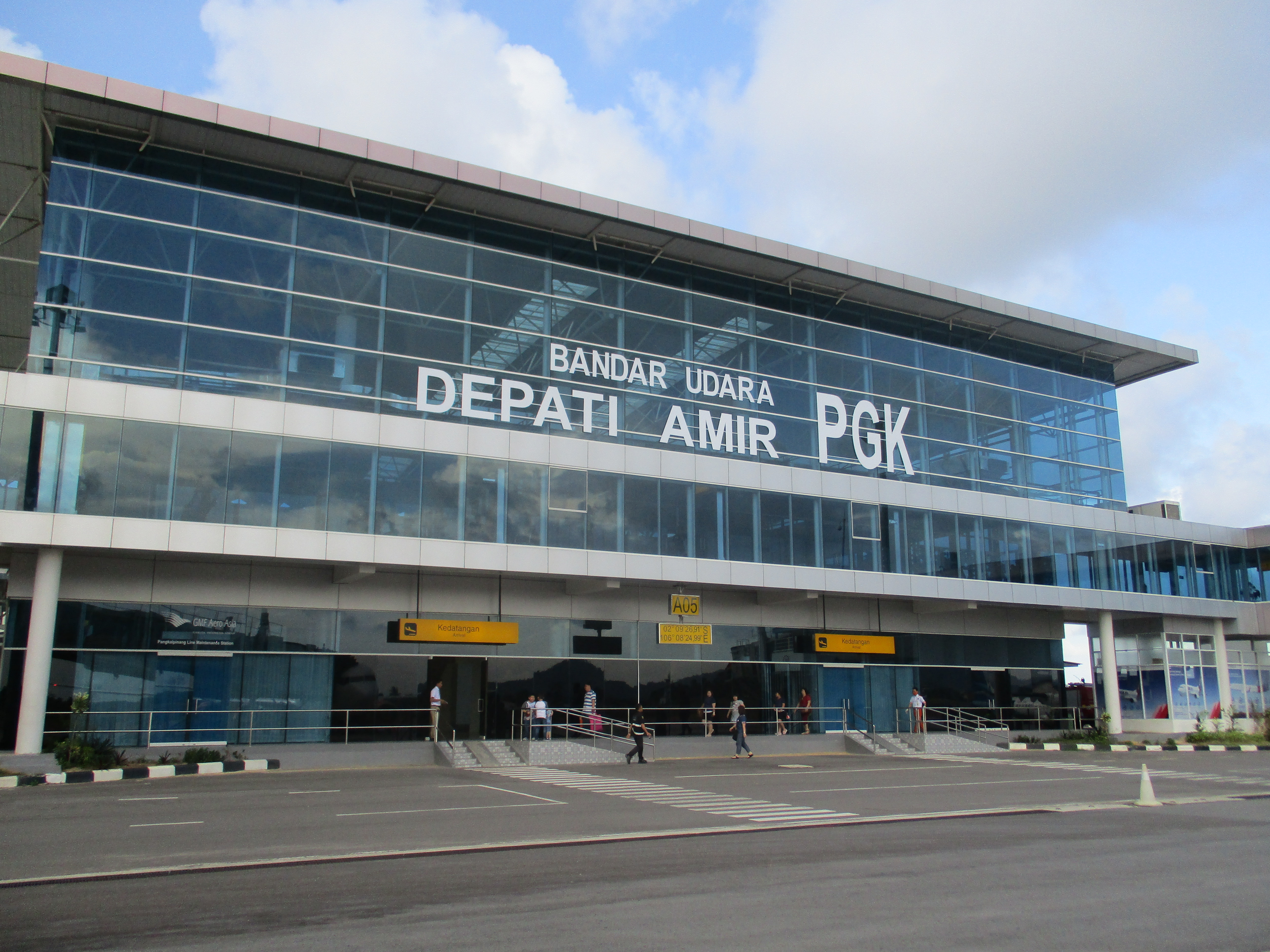
Facade of the current terminal, which has been in operation since 2017

In the early 1990s, the Bangka Regency government, prior to the establishment of the Bangka Belitung Islands province and Central Bangka Regency, proposed designating the airport as an international airport and introducing direct flights to Singapore, which was approximately 60 minutes away, eliminating the need to transit through Batam or Jakarta. However, the Ministry of Transportation did not approve the proposal, allowing only charter flights to operate internationally. In 1999, the airport was renamed to its current name in honor of Depati Amir, a Bangka aristocrat and national hero of Indonesia who resisted Dutch colonialism and the exploitation of resources in Bangka during the 19th century.

In 2007, the management of the airport was transferred from the Directorate General of Civil Aviation of the Ministry of Transportation to Angkasa Pura II, which has since been rebranded as InJourney Airports.

A new terminal, located to the northeast of the old terminal across the runway, was inaugurated by President Joko Widodo on 14 March 2019. After its opening, all airport operations were relocated to the new terminal, and the old terminal was abandoned, gradually falling into disrepair. Although there have been proposals to repurpose the old terminal as a bus terminal, these plans have yet to be realized.

To attract international tourists to Bangka, plans are underway to designate the airport as an international airport, enabling the launch of international flights. Relevant infrastructure is currently being developed to accommodate these flights, with the goal of achieving international status by 2026. Following the elevation of the airport's status, it was initially planned to handle international flights to Singapore and Malaysia, as well as direct flights to Bali, with the aim of promoting tourism growth in Bangka. The airport is also expected to become a Hajj embarkation point, allowing direct flights to Saudi Arabia for pilgrims. However, this is contingent on the completion of runway upgrades to accommodate wide-body aircraft.

== Facilities and development ==
Boarding gate

Due to overcapacity, a larger terminal was needed to accommodate the growing number of passengers. Construction of the new terminal began in 2012. After several delays, the new airport terminal officially opened on 11 January 2017. The construction of the terminal cost approximately 300 billion rupiah. With a capacity to accommodate 1.5 million passengers annually, the new terminal significantly surpasses the old one, which could only handle 350,000 passengers per year. In 2018, the number of passengers passing through the airport reached 2.17 million, exceeding the terminal's capacity at the time. As a result, an expansion was carried out to double the capacity to around 3 million passengers, which was completed in 2020. A total of 648 billion rupiah was invested in the construction and expansion of the new terminal.

The terminal building covers 12,000 square meters of the total 152-hectare land area and can accommodate up to 3.2 million passengers annually. The terminal features a modern design and is equipped with enhanced amenities such as food courts, an executive break room, internet access, disabled-friendly toilets, and a dedicated mother and child room. Other facilities include 12 check-in counters, three departure gates, and three jetbridges. The expanded parking area can accommodates 300 cars and 120 motorcycles.

The airport has an apron covering 51,660 m² (555,965 sq ft), with capacity for up to nine narrow-body aircraft, such as the Boeing 737 and Airbus A320. As of 2026, the runway measures 2,600 m × 45 m (8,530 ft × 148 ft), having been extended from its previous length of 2,250 m (7,382 ft), and is capable of accommodating narrow-body aircraft such as the Boeing 737 and Airbus A320.

The Bangka-Belitung government plans to develop maintenance, repair, and overhaul (MRO) facilities at the airport, similar to those at Hang Nadim International Airport in Batam. To support this initiative, the government has invited several airlines, including Sriwijaya Air, to invest in the construction of these facilities.

== Airlines and destinations ==
=== Passenger ===
Airlines	Destinations
Citilink	Jakarta–Soekarno-Hatta
Garuda Indonesia	Jakarta–Soekarno-Hatta
NAM Air	Jakarta–Soekarno-Hatta
Sriwijaya Air	Jakarta–Soekarno-Hatta
Super Air Jet	Jakarta–Soekarno-Hatta, Palembang, Tanjung Pandan, Yogyakarta–International
Wings Air	Batam, Palembang, Tanjung Pandan

== Statistics ==
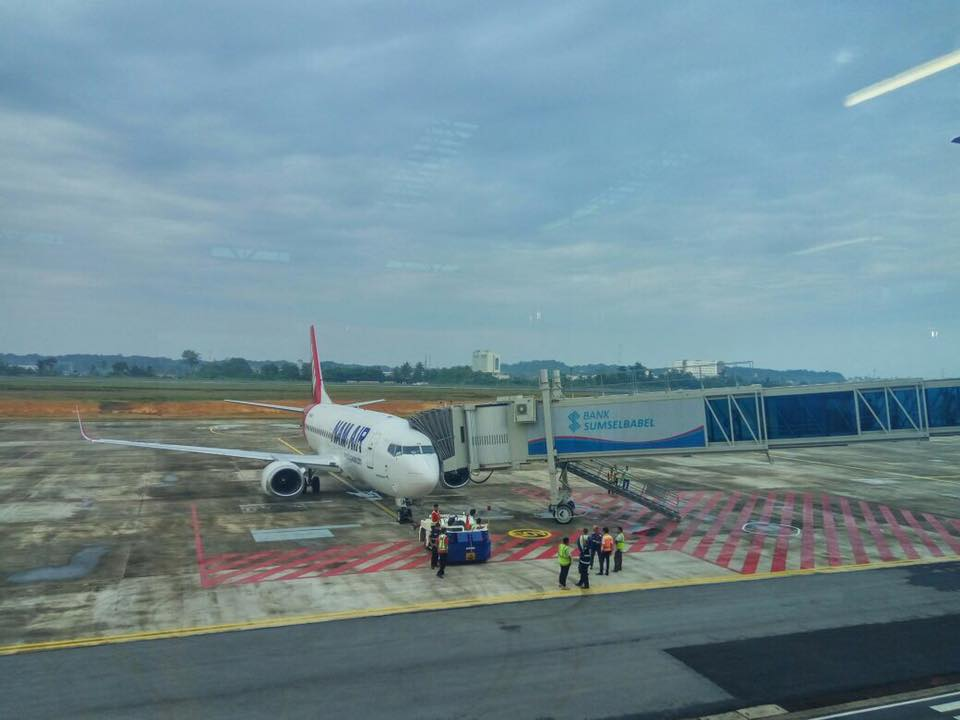
Apron view of the airport, with a NAM Air Boeing 737-500 on standby

Annual passenger numbers and aircraft statistics
Year	Passengers handled	Passenger % change	Cargo (tonnes)	Cargo % change	Aircraft movements	Aircraft % change
2006	801,554	Steady	1,825	Steady	4,350	Steady
2007	733,458	▼8.5	4,592	▲151.6	7,094	▲63.1
2008	881,469	▲20.2	3,637	▼20.8	9,034	▲27.3
2009	940,905	▲6.7	4,459	▲22.6	8,551	▼5.3
2010	1,184,468	▲25.9	6,657	▲49.3	10,056	▲17.6
2011	1,309,170	▲10.5	10,244	▲53.9	11,507	▲14.4
2012	1,484,357	▲13.4	8,350	▼18.5	12,471	▲8.4
2013	1,467,118	▼1.2	6,075	▼27.2	11,862	▼4.9
2014	1,401,308	▼4.5	7,466	▲22.9	10,711	▼9.7
2015	1,636,319	▲16.8	6,671	▼10.6	13,985	▲30.6
2016	1,913,006	▲16.9	7,326	▲9.8	16,196	▲15.8
2017	2,035,147	▲6.4	9,147	▲24.9	23,100	▲42.6
2018	2,162,290	▼6.2	10,905	▲19.2	21,361	▲7.5
2019	1,634,951	▼24.4	8,511	▼22.0	17,471	▼18.2
2020	673,066	▼58.8	6,023	▼29.2	9,592	▼45.1
2021	637,652	▼5.3	9,410	▲56.2	6,936	▼27.7
2022	1,197,207	▲87.8	10,527	▲11.9	10,251	▲47.8
2023	1,315,252	▲9.9	9,191	▼12.7	10,213	▼0.4
2024	1,219,122	▼7.3	10,354	▲12.7	10,478	▲2.6
^{Source: DGCA, BPS}
