= Sriwijaya Air Flight 062 =

2008 aviation accident in Indonesia

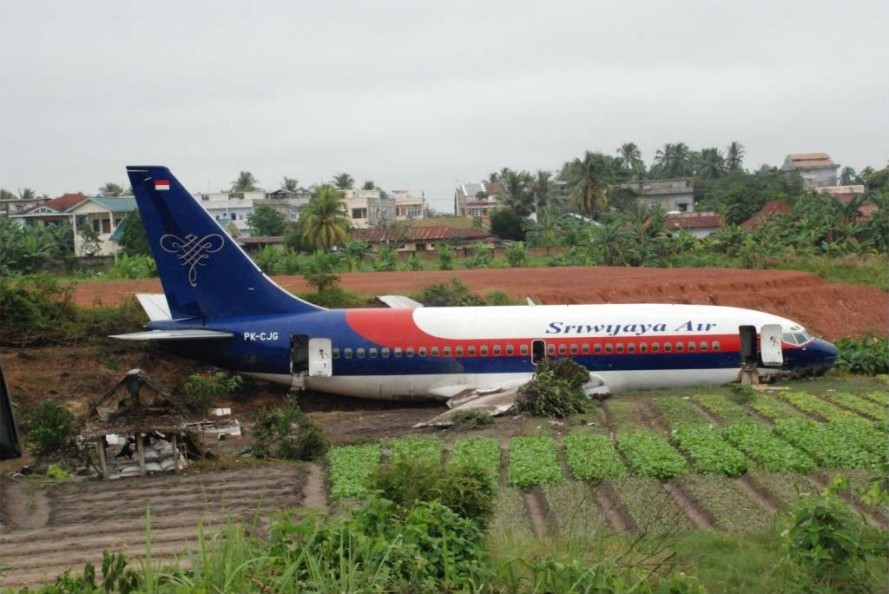
- The aircraft after overrunning the runway

Accident
- Date: 27 August 2008
- Summary: Runway excursion due to hydraulic failure
- Site: Sultan Thaha Airport, Jambi, Indonesia; 1°37′52″S 103°38′12″E
- Total fatalities: 1
- Total injuries: 26

Aircraft
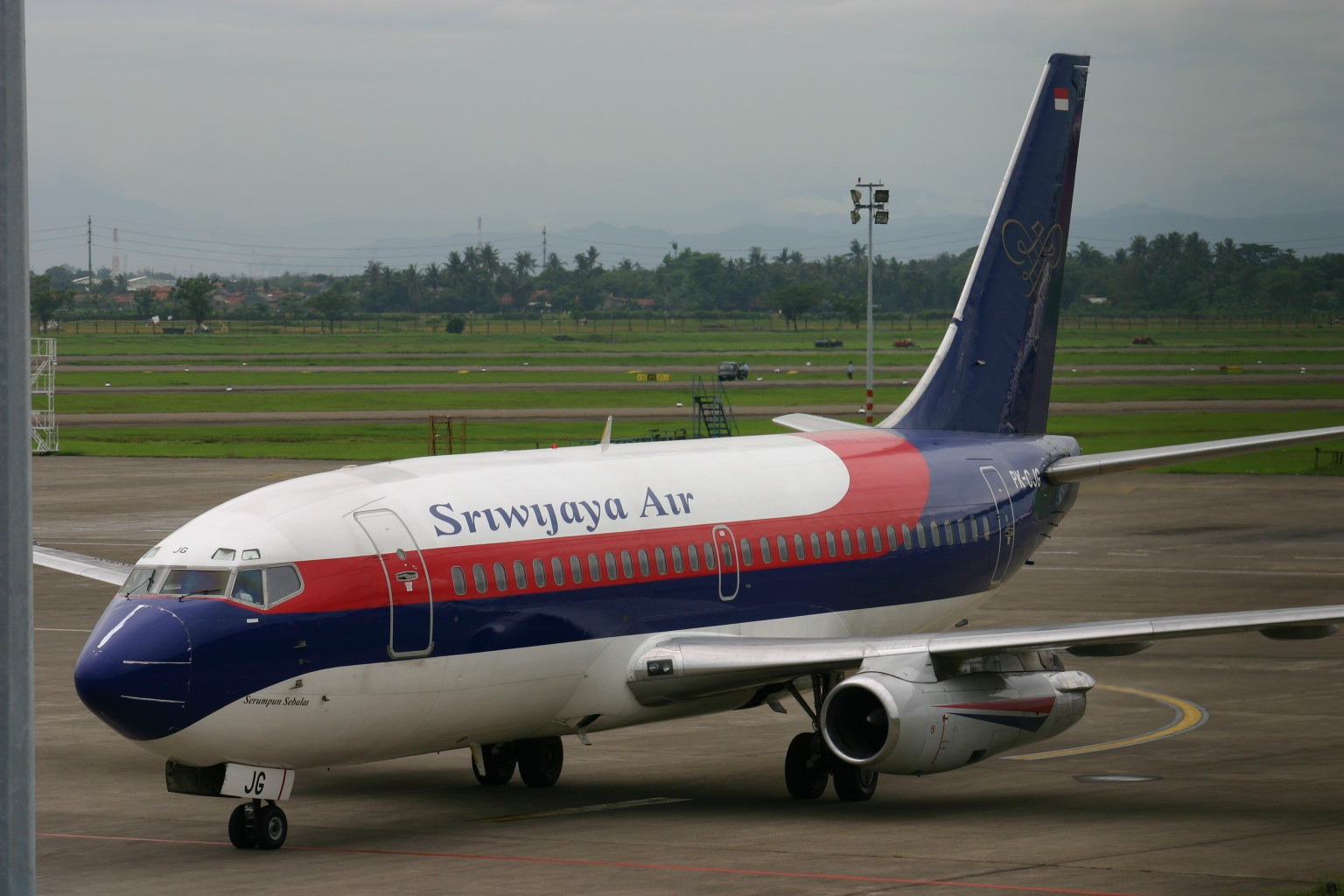
- PK-CJG, the aircraft involved in the accident, seen in 2004
- Aircraft type: Boeing 737-2H6
- Aircraft name: Serumpun Sebalay
- Operator: Sriwijaya Air
- IATA flight No.: SJ062
- ICAO flight No.: SJY062
- Call sign: SRIWIJAYA 062
- Registration: PK-CJG
- Flight origin: Soekarno-Hatta International Airport, Jakarta
- Destination: Sultan Thaha Airport, Jambi
- Occupants: 130
- Passengers: 124
- Crew: 6
- Fatalities: 0
- Injuries: 23
- Survivors: 130

Ground casualties
- Ground fatalities: 1
- Ground injuries: 3

Sriwijaya Air Flight 062 was a scheduled domestic passenger flight, operated by Indonesian airline Sriwijaya Air from Soekarno-Hatta International Airport, Jakarta to Sultan Thaha Airport, Jambi. On 27 August 2008, the aircraft operating the flight, a Boeing 737-200 registered as PK-CJG, overran the runway and crashed onto a house during its landing attempt at Jambi. Due to the accident, 26 people were injured, including 3 people on the ground. One person later succumbed to his injuries. Everyone on board the aircraft survived the crash. It was the first fatal crash in Sriwijaya Air's operational history and was the only fatal accident until Sriwijaya Air Flight 182 crashed in 2021.

Investigation carried out by the Indonesian National Transportation Safety Committee (NTSC) concluded that hydraulics failure were the cause of the crash of Flight 062. According to the NTSC, the failure of the hydraulics system A caused several systems on the aircraft to be inoperative. No definitive cause of the failure of the hydraulics were found by the NTSC. The NTSC also noted about the CRM failure of the crew on board.

== Aircraft and crew ==
The aircraft involved in the accident was a Boeing 737-200 with an Indonesian registration of PK-CJG. The aircraft was manufactured in 1985 and had a serial number of 23320. From 1985 to 1993 the aircraft was operated by Malaysia Airlines. It was later sold to Bouraq Airlines, Tuninter, WFBN, Star Air and later to Sriwijaya Air. It had a flying cycle for over 54,700 cycles and its last major inspection was in November 2007.

The captain was 36-year old Mohammad Basuki. According to a Sriwijaya Air spokesman, Basuki was a very experienced pilot with a total of 7,794 flight hours, including 6,238 hours on the Boeing 737. The First Officer was 34-year old Eri Radianto. According to Sriwijaya Air, Eri was also an experienced pilot with a 5,000 flight hours with 4,100 hours of them on the type.

== Flight ==
Flight 062 was operated by a Boeing 737-200 registered as PK-CJG. The aircraft was carrying 124 passengers and 6 crews consisted of 4 flight attendants and 2 pilots. The flight was a one-hour flight and was dispatched with a fuel endurance of 4 hours. The number one electrical engine driven generator was unusable and thus the crews had to use the auxiliary power unit (APU). Captain Basuki acted as Pilot Flying.

At 16:18 local time, Flight 062 contacted Thaha Tower and stated its intention to land at Sultan Thaha Airport. Before the contact the aircraft had been cleared by Palembang Tower to descend to 12,500 feet (3,800 m). The First Officer then asked about the weather information at the airport. The weather was reported to be calm, with rain over the air field. The crew then configured the aircraft for landing by extending the landing gear and the flaps.

13 seconds after the extension, the crew noticed the hydraulic system A low pressure warning light illuminated, and also the hydraulic system A quantity indicator showed zero. Captain Basuki asked First Officer Eri to check their landing configuration. After the check, the crew decided to continue its landing attempt. Captain Basuki then decided to fly the aircraft slightly below the glide slope.

At 16:30 local time, Flight 062 touched down the runway. The crew then tried to apply the thrust reversers, however the thrust somehow became too heavy and became too difficult to be pulled by the crew. Captain Basuki then applied maximum brake, however the aircraft didn't decelerate. Fearing that the aircraft might overrun the runway, the Captain then asked First Officer Eri to assist the braking. However, the aircraft didn't significantly decelerate.

Flight 062 then drifted to the right and overran the runway. The aircraft then hit a house where one family were resting. All of them were waiting for the rain to stop when suddenly the aircraft came from nowhere. The farmers didn't have enough time to react and the aircraft slammed onto them. The right engine and the left engine detached from the aircraft. Immediately after the crash, the flight attendants waited for the evacuation order from Captain Basuki. However, the passengers immediately evacuated themselves before the order from the Captain. The flight attendants then immediately executed the evacuation process without the order from the Captain. Rescue services then arrived at the crash site and sprayed the aircraft with foam agents. At least 26 people were injured, with most of them suffered shock and skin laceration. All of them were transported to the Asia Medika Hospital. The three people who were struck on the ground were seriously injured. The toddler identified as 4-year old Rahmad Sholikin, suffered broken limbs due to the impact. His mother also suffered broken limbs. His father, was critically injured and succumbed to his injuries on 28 August and was the only fatality in the accident.

== Investigation ==
The National Transportation Safety Committee was ordered to investigate the cause of the crash. On 28 August the committee sent 3 people to the crash site to inspect the wreckage. The head of NTSC Tatang Kurniadi stated that the investigation into the cause of the crash would take around a year. However, he added that the length of the investigation wouldn't be as long as the investigation of Adam Air Flight 574.

According to survivors and eyewitnesses, weather condition near or at the airport during the crash was inclement with most claimed that heavy rain was present. Several others claimed that the aircraft suffered a hard landing. Another statement from survivors suggested that the aircraft had suffered a failure on its braking system. Most survivors including the cockpit crew of the flight claimed about this. Initially a broken nose wheel was also suspected as the main cause of the crash. This claim then raised questions on the airworthiness of the aircraft.

However, the Vice President of Sriwijaya Air, Harwick Lahunduitan, stated that the aircraft involved in the crash was airworthy and if the brake had failed the casualties could have been much higher. He also refuted the claim that Flight 062 suffered a hard landing. He later explained that the wind was blowing from the front and was not from the back of the aircraft, and added that the visibility was "great". Sriwijaya Air spokesman Charles An stated that the brake was 'functioning normally'.

The National Transportation Safety Committee found that the aircraft's hydraulic system A had failed during the flight. The hydraulics are one of the most important components on the Boeing 737. Hydraulics control most of the aircraft's control, including the flaps, slats, brake, thrust reversers, etc. The Boeing 737 aircraft is designed to operate on only one Hydraulic System (A or B) with minimal performance loss. Data collected from interviews and inspection on the aircraft's control concluded that most controls were inoperative or nearly unusable. The committee however could not conclude the cause of these failure as the impact severed the system.

Investigation revealed that the crew didn't discuss about the possible outcome of the failure of the hydraulics. They weren't concerned about the failure and decided to continue their landing attempt. According to the NTSC, the crew should have conducted a go-around and stick to their Quick Reference Handbook (abbreviated as QRH). There were procedures and steps on the QRH to handle such emergency. An analysis from the NTSC showed that if a failure on the hydraulics occurred, with the combined cargo of Flight 062, the aircraft would take a total distance of 8,606 ft. The NTSC stated that the crew should have conduct the go-around to assess the risks of landing. They later added that if the crew had handled the failure of the hydraulics correctly, Flight 062 could have landed safely at the airport.

== Aftermath ==
Due to the crash, Sultan Thaha Airport was closed for indefinite time. Angkasa Pura II Corporate Secretary Surdayanto stated that the aircraft would be evacuated from the runway by cutting it into several sections. The wreckage of the aircraft later would be inspected by investigators. Rescue personnel consisted of 12 people had arrived at the site on Sunday, 31 August 2008.

As the crash killed one person, Sriwijaya Air claimed responsibility for the death. According to the airline's manager, the airline would compensate the health services and bills of the family of the farmer who were affected by the crash and also the bills from the survivors. The toddler's school fee, whose father was killed in the crash, would also be compensated by Sriwijaya Air.

According to the NTSC, the severity of the crash was irrelevant, and therefore the committee didn't issue any recommendation to Sriwijaya Air, though the airlines had implemented several safety actions in response to the crash.

== See also ==
- Gabon Express Flight 221
