= GMF AeroAsia =

Indonesian company

- Traded as: IDX: GMFI
- Industry: Aircraft maintenance, repair, and overhaul
- Founded: 2002
- Founder: Garuda Indonesia
- Headquarters: Soekarno-Hatta International Airport, Jakarta, Indonesia
- Key people: Andi Fahrurrozi (CEO)
- Services: Commercial Aircraft MRO, Defense MRO, Power Services, AOG Support
- Number of employees: 5,000 (2019)
- Parent: Garuda Indonesia
- Website: GMF AeroAsia

PT Garuda Maintenance Facility AeroAsia (GMF), a subsidiary of Garuda Indonesia, is an Indonesian aircraft maintenance, repair, and overhaul (MRO) company. Headquartered at Soekarno–Hatta International Airport, the company provides one stop aircraft maintenance services, including airframe, engine, component, line maintenance, and cabin maintenance. Expanding its capability, GMF provides maintenance for AOG Support, industrial gas turbine engines, and defense aircraft. GMF is developing sustainable aerospace initiatives at Kertajati, West Java. In the 2024 financial year, disclosed in June 2025, GMF reported operating revenue of USD 421.22 million and net profit of USD 26.90 million.

== History ==
GMF traces its origins to 1949 as Garuda Indonesia’s technical division. It became an independent MRO subsidiary in August 2002 under PT Garuda Maintenance Facility Aero Asia Tbk. In the mid-2010s the company commissioned Hangar 4 at Soekarno–Hatta, one of the world’s largest dedicated narrow-body hangars, increasing base-maintenance capacity.

Entering the 2020s, GMF diversified and expanded partnerships. At Indo Defence 2024, GMF announced cooperation with Turkish Aerospace Indonesia, Boeing, PT Inspirasi Putera Mandiri, Autocraft for the E20+ eVTOL program, and Dassault Aviation, marking a deeper entry into defense and advanced aerospace solutions.

In April 2025, GMF, BIJB, and Bappenas inaugurated a strategic partnership to develop the Sustainable Aerospace Park Kertajati, with GMF as the anchor tenant under a joint-operation scheme, targeting an integrated national aerospace ecosystem.

At MRO Asia-Pacific 2025 in Singapore, GMF advanced collaborations with Honeywell for flat-rate repair programs covering APU and LRU components, and engaged cabin-interior partners and regional airlines.

In October 2025, GMF signed a strategic partnership with Pelita Air to utilize the Pondok Cabe hangar for maintenance activities that include ATR aircraft and Bell 412 helicopters, expanding rotary-wing coverage.

== Services and Business Segments ==
1. Commercial Aircraft MRO Base and line maintenance for Airbus, Boeing, and ATR aircraft at GMF’s main base at Soekarno–Hatta International Airport and its outstations across Indonesia. GMF holds approvals from multiple regulators, including the FAA and EASA, as well as Indonesia’s DGCA and other aviation authorities.
2. Defense MRO Maintenance and modification for state and defense operators, including heavy checks on the C-130 Hercules Series, Boeing 737 Series, Airbus A400M, Dassault Falcon 8X, Airbus Helicopter Super Puma AS332L1, Indonesian Army Bell 412 helicopters, and other fixed-wing fleets under national programs.
3. Power Services Component and engine-related solutions, including APU and LRU repair programs; collaboration with Honeywell strengthens regional component repair offerings.
4. AOG Support Rapid-response maintenance services to minimize aircraft downtime, supported by mobile teams and logistics partners.

GMF also explores future technologies such as participation in E20+ eVTOL development and other green aerospace solutions linked to the Kertajati initiative.

== Facilities ==
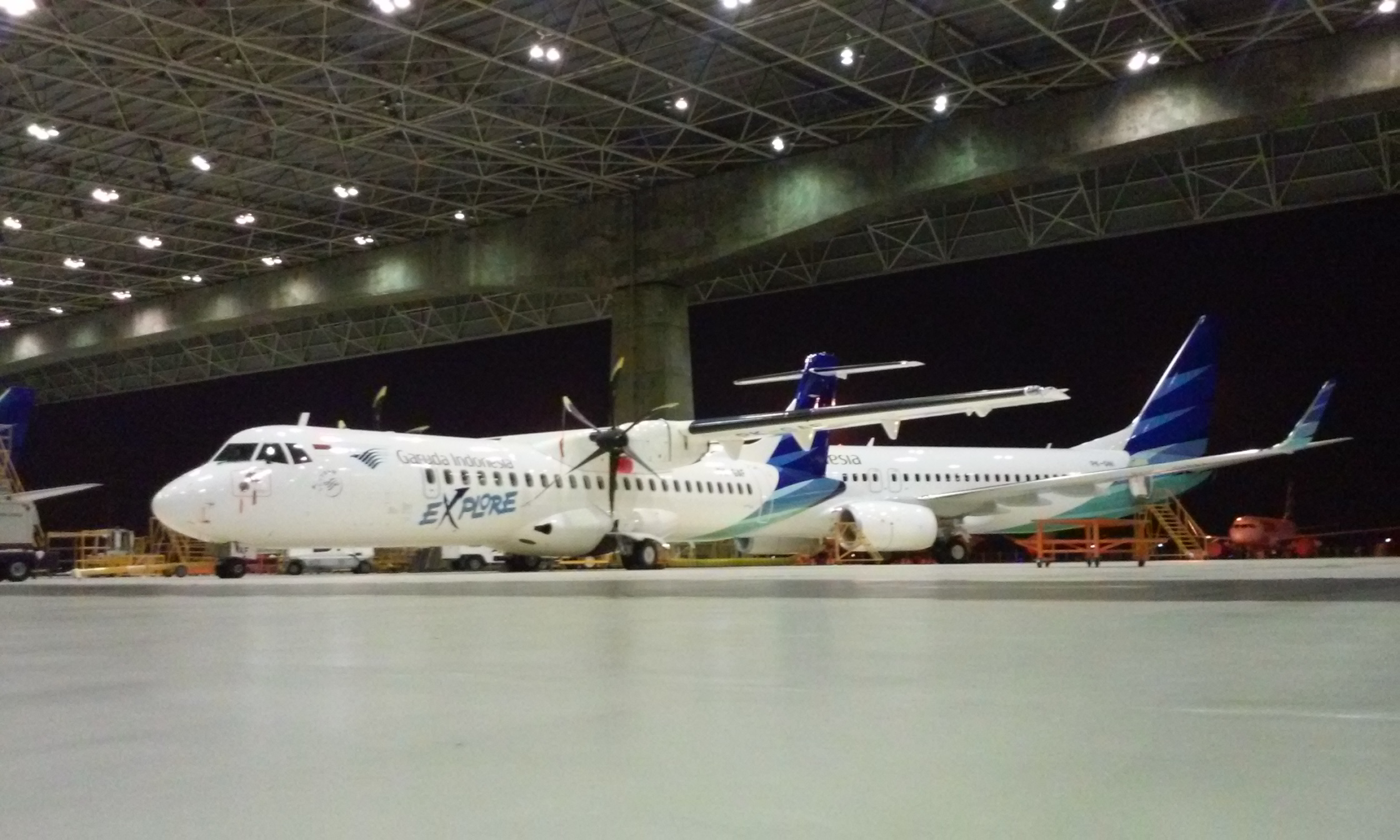
Garuda Indonesia ATR 72-600 and Boeing 737-800 at GMF AeroAsia Hangar 2

The main maintenance facility is located at Soekarno–Hatta International Airport, comprising four hangars and specialized workshops. Each hangar is designed to accommodate different aircraft types and maintenance levels.

- Hangar 1 covers approximately 22,000 square meters and is equipped with dedicated docking platforms for heavy maintenance of wide-body aircraft. It has two bays that can accommodate wide-body aircraft simultaneously.
- Hangar 2, with an area of 23,000 square meters, is designed for light to medium maintenance checks, up to A-Check level. The hangar features two bays for wide-body aircraft and six bays for narrow-body aircraft.
- Hangar 3 also spans 23,000 square meters and is specifically designed for the Airbus A330 series. It includes dedicated docking platforms for heavy maintenance, three bays for Airbus A330 aircraft, fifteen bays for narrow-body aircraft, and one additional bay used for aircraft painting.
- Hangar 4 is the largest facility, covering 66,940 square meters, and is dedicated to narrow-body aircraft. Recognized as one of the largest narrow-body aircraft hangars in the world, it can accommodate up to sixteen narrow-body aircraft simultaneously, with one bay dedicated to aircraft painting operations.

For line maintenance, GMF has 43 line maintenance stations across Indonesia to support minor repairs and operational readiness. In West Java, the Sustainable Aerospace Park Kertajati is planned as an integrated hub for MRO, training, research and development, and manufacturing support, with GMF serving as the anchor tenant.

== Clients and Global Reach ==
GMF serves more than 190 customers across over 60 countries, including airlines in the Asia-Pacific region. Recent engagements highlighted at MRO Asia-Pacific 2025 included Thai Vietjet Air, Cebu Pacific, and Fiji Airways.

== Financial Performance ==
For the 2024 fiscal year, approved at the June 2025 Annual General Meeting of Shareholders, GMF recorded USD 421.22 million in revenue and USD 26.90 million in net profit, marking an improvement from its 2023 performance. The company attributed this growth to market recovery, operational efficiency, and portfolio diversification.

Based on the audited financial statements as of December 31, 2025, GMFI recorded revenue of USD 491.9 million, reflecting a 16.8% year-on-year (YoY) increase. Net profit rose from USD 26.9 million in 2024 to USD 33.9 million in 2025, marking a 26.3% YoY growth.

== Management ==
As of September 2025, the management structure of PT Garuda Maintenance Facility Aero Asia Tbk (GMF), following the Extraordinary General Meeting of Shareholders (EGMS) held on 26 September 2025, is as follows:

Board of Commissioners

- President Commissioner / Independent Commissioner: Oki Yanuar
- Independent Commissioner: Dean Arslan
- Commissioner: Giring Ganesha Djumaryo
- Commissioner: Sugiharto Prapto

Board of Directors

- CEO: Andi Fahrurrozi
- Director of Base Management: Bobi Gumelar Respati
- Director of Line Operation: Endang Tardiana
- Director of Human Resource: Mitra Piranti
- Director of Finance: Tri Hartono

== Recent Developments (2024-2025) ==
1. Capital Measures On October 28, 2024 GMF held an Extraordinary General Meeting of Shareholders (EGMS) to accelerate a rights issue aimed at strengthening its capital structure. On October 24, 2025, the EGMS approved a strategic in-kind asset contribution from PT Angkasa Pura Indonesia, including 972,123 square meters of land at Soekarno–Hatta, which is expected to restore GMF’s equity position to positive.
2. Defense Projects GMF expanded its defense MRO portfolio through the fourth heavy check of the Indonesian Army’s Bell 412 helicopter in September 2025, with additional units scheduled. In 2026, its collaboration with Koharmatau further broadened GMF’s capabilities from C-130-focused maintenance to multi-platform defense MRO.
3. Partnership and Technology GMF strengthened its partnerships and technology initiatives through Honeywell flat-rate repair programs and collaborations with cabin and component partners at MRO Asia-Pacific 2025. The company also advanced cooperation frameworks announced at Indo Defence 2024 with Turkish Aerospace Indonesia, Boeing, IPM, Autocraft for the E20+ program, and Dassault Aviation.
4. Domestic Capacity GMF strengthened its domestic capacity through a strategic partnership with Pelita Air to support maintenance operations at Pondok Cabe.
5. Sustainable Aerospace GMF strengthened its sustainable aerospace agenda through the Kertajati Aerospace Park partnership with BIJB and Bappenas, with GMF serving as the anchor tenant.

== Pandemic Recovery (2021) ==
In July 2021, GMF outlined a sustainable recovery plan focused on the domestic market, cargo conversion works, and diversification into power services, defense, and business jets, while implementing cost and capital management measures during the industry downturn.
