= List of SilkAir destinations =

Before merging with Singapore Airlines, SilkAir was flying to three destinations at the end of April 2021. As the regional wing of Singapore Airlines, it operated flights to Asia and Australia from its hub at Changi Airport. On 6 May 2021, the last SilkAir flight landed from Kathmandu.

== List ==
Country	City	Airport	Notes	Refs
Australia	Cairns	Cairns Airport	Terminated	
Australia	Darwin	Darwin International Airport	Terminated	
Bangladesh	Chittagong	Shah Amanat International Airport	Terminated	
Cambodia	Phnom Penh	Phnom Penh International Airport	Terminated	
Cambodia	Siem Reap	Siem Reap International Airport	Terminated	
China	Changsha	Changsha Huanghua International Airport	Terminated	
China	Chengdu	Chengdu Shuangliu International Airport	Terminated	
China	Chongqing	Chongqing Jiangbei International Airport	Terminated	
China	Fuzhou	Fuzhou Changle International Airport	Terminated	
China	Guilin	Guilin Liangjiang International Airport	Terminated	
China	Hangzhou	Hangzhou Xiaoshan International Airport	Terminated	
China	Kunming	Kunming Changshui International Airport	Terminated	
China	Macau	Macau International Airport	Terminated	
China	Shenzhen	Shenzhen Bao'an International Airport	Terminated	
China	Wuhan	Wuhan Tianhe International Airport	Terminated	
China	Xiamen	Xiamen Gaoqi International Airport	Terminated	
India	Bangalore	Kempegowda International Airport	Terminated	
India	Chennai	Chennai International Airport	Terminated	
India	Coimbatore	Coimbatore International Airport	Terminated	
India	Hyderabad	Rajiv Gandhi International Airport	Terminated	
India	Kochi	Cochin International Airport	Terminated	
India	Kolkata	Netaji Subhash Chandra Bose International Airport	Terminated	
India	Thiruvananthapuram	Trivandrum International Airport	Terminated	
India	Visakhapatnam	Visakhapatnam Airport	Terminated	
Indonesia	Balikpapan	Sultan Aji Muhammad Sulaiman Airport	Terminated	
Indonesia	Bandung	Husein Sastranegara International Airport	Terminated	
Indonesia	Denpasar	Ngurah Rai International Airport	Terminated	
Indonesia	Jakarta	Soekarno–Hatta International Airport	Terminated	
Indonesia	Lombok	Zainuddin Abdul Madjid International Airport	Terminated	
Indonesia	Makassar	Sultan Hasanuddin International Airport	Terminated	
Indonesia	Manado	Sam Ratulangi International Airport	Terminated	
Indonesia	Medan	Kualanamu International Airport	Terminated	
Indonesia	Medan	Polonia International Airport	Airport closed	
Indonesia	Padang	Minangkabau International Airport	Terminated	
Indonesia	Palembang	Sultan Mahmud Badaruddin II Airport	Terminated	
Indonesia	Pekanbaru	Sultan Syarif Qasim II International Airport	Terminated	
Indonesia	Semarang	Ahmad Yani International Airport	Terminated	
Indonesia	Solo	Adisumarmo International Airport	Terminated	
Indonesia	Surabaya	Juanda International Airport	Terminated	
Indonesia	Yogyakarta	Adisucipto International Airport	Terminated	
Indonesia	Yogyakarta	Yogyakarta International Airport	Terminated	
Japan	Hiroshima	Hiroshima Airport	Terminated	
Japan	Okinawa	Naha International Airport	Terminated	
Laos	Luang Prabang	Luang Prabang International Airport	Terminated	
Laos	Vientiane	Wattay International Airport	Terminated	
Malaysia	Kota Kinabalu	Kota Kinabalu International Airport	Terminated	
Malaysia	Kuala Lumpur	Kuala Lumpur International Airport	Terminated	
Malaysia	Kuantan	Sultan Haji Ahmad Shah Airport	Terminated	
Malaysia	Kuching	Kuching International Airport	Terminated	
Malaysia	Langkawi	Langkawi International Airport	Terminated	
Malaysia	Penang	Penang International Airport	Terminated	
Maldives	Malé	Velana International Airport	Terminated	
Myanmar	Mandalay	Mandalay International Airport	Terminated	
Myanmar	Yangon	Yangon International Airport	Terminated	
Nepal	Kathmandu	Tribhuvan International Airport	Terminated	
Philippines	Cebu	Mactan–Cebu International Airport	Terminated	
Philippines	Davao	Francisco Bangoy International Airport	Terminated	
Philippines	Kalibo	Kalibo International Airport	Terminated	
Singapore	Singapore	Changi Airport	Hub	
South Korea	Busan	Gimhae International Airport	Terminated	
Sri Lanka	Colombo	Bandaranaike International Airport	Terminated	
Taiwan	Kaohsiung	Kaohsiung International Airport	Terminated	
Thailand	Chiang Mai	Chiang Mai International Airport	Terminated	
Thailand	Hat Yai	Hat Yai International Airport	Terminated	
Thailand	Koh Samui	Samui Airport	Terminated	
Thailand	Krabi	Krabi International Airport	Terminated	
Thailand	Pattaya	U-Tapao International Airport	Terminated	
Thailand	Phuket	Phuket International Airport	Terminated	
Vietnam	Da Nang	Da Nang International Airport	Terminated	
Vietnam	Hanoi	Noi Bai International Airport	Terminated	
