= Kalimarau Airport =

Indonesian airport

Kalimarau Airport Bandar Udara Kalimarau
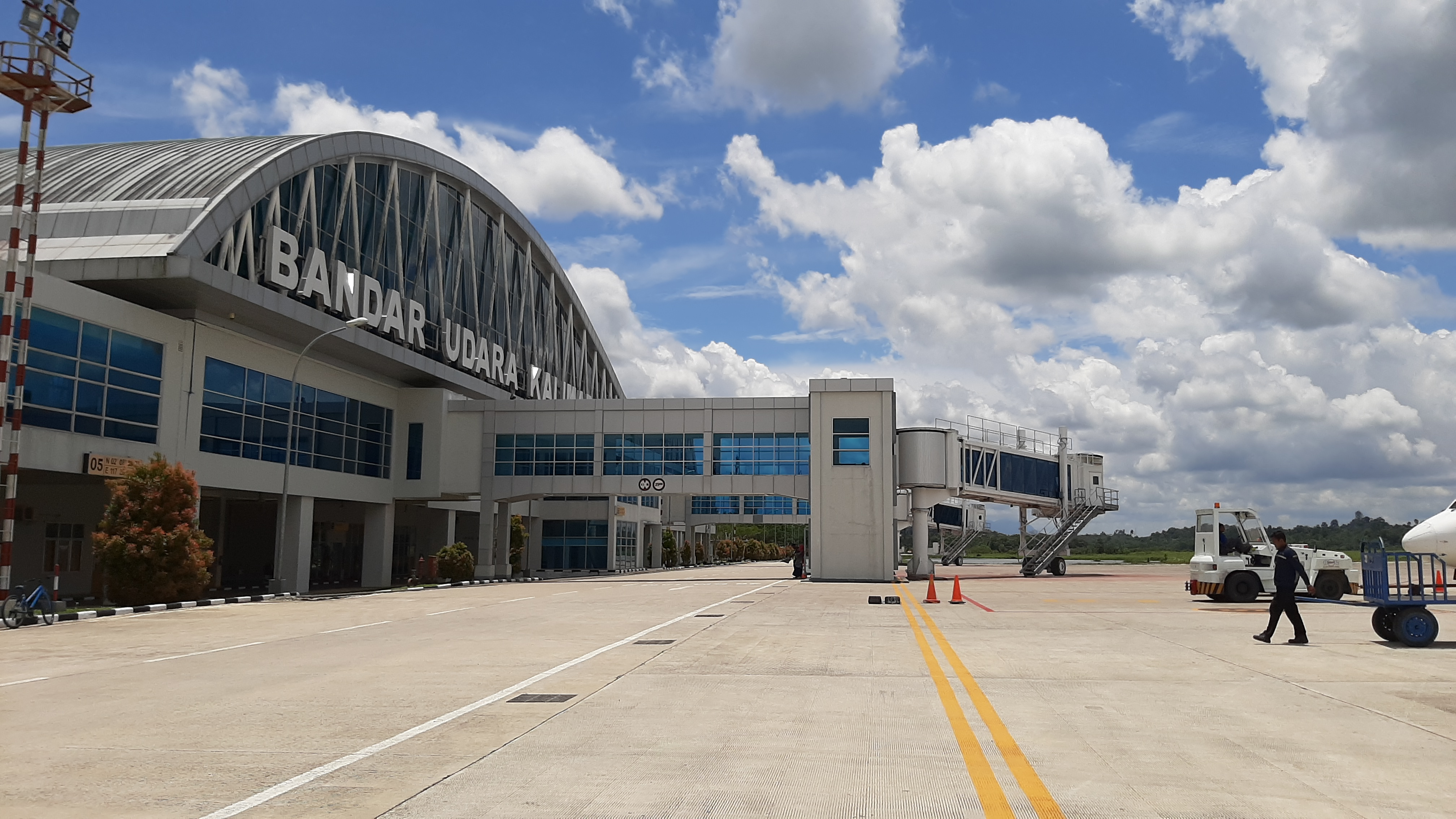
- IATA: BEJ; ICAO: WAQT

Summary
- Airport type: Public / Military
- Owner: Government of Indonesia
- Operator: Directorate General of Civil Aviation
- Serves: Tanjung Redeb
- Location: Tanjung Redeb, Berau Regency, East Kalimantan, Indonesia
- Time zone: WITA (UTC+08:00)
- Elevation AMSL: 59 ft (18 m)
- Coordinates: 02°09′19″N 117°25′56″E

Map
- Location in Kalimantan

Runways
Direction	Length		Surface
Direction	m	ft	Surface
01/19	2,250	7,381	Asphalt

Statistics (2024)
- Passengers: 405,932 (▲21.7%)
- Cargo (tonnes): 1,428 (▲46.6%)
- Aircraft movements: 5,482 (▼9.7%)
- Source: DGCA

Kalimarau Airport (IATA: BEJ, ICAO: WAQT) is a domestic airport that serves the town of Tanjung Redeb, the capital of Berau Regency in East Kalimantan, Indonesia. It is situated approximately 8 km (5 miles) from the town center and is located at the bank of the Berau River. The airport takes its name from the Kalimarau River, a small tributary that flows in front of the airport's terminal. As the main gateway to Tanjung Redeb and the greater Berau Regency, the airport also provides access to popular destinations such as the Derawan Islands, renowned for their rich marine biodiversity. Kalimarau Airport is currently served by regular flights to major Indonesian cities, including Jakarta, Balikpapan, Surabaya, and Makassar.

In addition to its role as a commercial airport, Kalimarau Airport also hosts a military airbase operated by the Indonesian Army’s Army Aviation Center (Puspenerbad), located north of the passenger terminal. The base serves as the headquarters of the 13th Assault Squadron, which operates a fleet of Bell 412 and Airbus AS555AP Fennec 2 helicopters. Its location is considered strategically important due to its proximity to the Indonesia–Malaysia border, making it a vital asset for national defense and regional security. There are also plans for the Indonesian Air Force to establish an airbase at the airport and station combat aircraft there.

== History ==
=== Construction and early history ===
Kalimarau Airport was established in 1976 as part of a government initiative to construct airstrips in rural areas of East Kalimantan, improving access to remote communities where transportation infrastructure was limited. At the time, it was designated as a rural airport with a runway only 650 meters long, intended to accommodate small aircraft serving remote areas. These included planes like the Cessna 206 operated by Mission Aviation Fellowship (MAF), which could carry just five passengers and two crew members. The apron was initially constructed using steel plates.

By the 1980s, the airport was serving regular flights to other destinations in East Kalimantan, including Samarinda, the provincial capital, with services operated by Bouraq Indonesian Airlines and Merpati Nusantara Airlines, using small aircraft such as the de Havilland Canada DHC-6 Twin Otter and the Short SC.7 Skyvan. Other destinations connected to Tanjung Redeb at the time included Tarakan and Balikpapan.

From the 1990s to 2006, the airport underwent continuous development and renovation to improve its infrastructure, including the extension of the runway to accommodate larger aircraft such as the CASA C-212 Aviocar. By the early 2000s, the airport continued to primarily serve intra–East Kalimantan routes, including flights to Balikpapan, Samarinda, and Tarakan, operated by Kalstar Aviation and Dirgantara Air Services (DAS).

In 2007, the runway was extended to 1,850 meters and resurfaced. A year later, in 2008, Kalimarau Airport was upgraded from a Class IV to a Class II airport, in line with East Kalimantan’s role as host of the 2008 National Sports Week (Pekan Olahraga Nasional, or PON). In 2011, the runway was extended once more to 2,250 meters to accommodate larger narrow-body aircraft such as the Boeing 737 and Airbus A320.

=== Contemporary history ===
To enhance defense capabilities and improve access to the Indonesian-Malaysian border, the establishment of an Indonesian Army Aviation Center helicopter squadron was proposed in 2012. The idea initially faced criticism from local government officials, who were concerned that a military presence could hinder the airport’s development. Despite the concerns, the 13th Assault Squadron was officially inaugurated on 25 August 2016. To support its operations, various facilities were constructed, including administrative offices, barracks, helicopter hangars, and other essential infrastructure. In addition, the Indonesian Air Force has expressed interest in establishing a military airbase at Kalimarau Airport to strengthen defense along the borders with Malaysia and the Philippines. Plans include the deployment of approximately 200 Air Force personnel to the facility, along with the potential stationing of combat aircraft to enhance regional defense capabilities.

The airport is currently operated by the Directorate General of Civil Aviation under the Ministry of Transportation. However, there have been proposals to transfer its management to Angkasa Pura I, which is now InJourney Airport, although these plans have yet to materialize.

There was once a proposal to upgrade the airport’s status to an international airport and introduce international flights to accommodate the growing number of tourists visiting Berau. The plan was initially targeted for completion by the end of 2012, but it has yet to be realized. Although Kalimarau Airport is not officially designated as an international airport, it is equipped with the necessary facilities to handle import and export activities.

In November 2025, the Berau Regency Regional House of Representatives (DPRD) proposed renaming the airport Raja Alam Sultan Alimuddin Kalimarau Airport, in honor of the first Sultan of the Sambaliung Sultanate, who is regarded as a freedom fighter against colonial rule in Berau during the 19th century. The proposal received support from Berau’s two traditional sultanates, the Sambaliung Sultanate and the Gunung Tabur Sultanate.

== Facilities and development ==
A major expansion of Kalimarau Airport began in 2010 and was completed in 2012 to accommodate the growing number of passengers and increasing air traffic. The project included the construction of a new terminal and supporting infrastructure, as well as the widening of the runway to 2,250 meters in length and 45 meters in width, enabling the airport to handle larger aircraft such as the Boeing 737 and Airbus A320. The development involved building a 16,667-square-meter passenger terminal, a 505-square-meter VIP terminal, and a 592-square-meter cargo terminal. The new passenger terminal is equipped with two jet bridges and features various amenities, including ATMs (Bank BPD Kaltim, Bank BRI, and Bank BNI), a prayer room (mushola), café, nursing room, on-site medical services, police post, food and beverage outlets, indoor and outdoor play areas, an ATV track, restrooms, and parking facilities. The upgraded airport was officially inaugurated by then-President Susilo Bambang Yudhoyono on 24 October 2012, with a total development cost of approximately 450 billion rupiah. The new terminal commenced operations on 5 December 2012.

To accommodate increasing air traffic, plans are in place to further extend the runway—first to 2,500 meters, and eventually to 2,750 meters—to enable the airport to handle larger aircraft such as the Boeing 737-900ER. However, the runway extension project faces challenges, particularly with land acquisition, as it requires the relocation of a provincial road before construction can begin.

== Airlines and destinations ==
Airlines	Destinations
Batik Air	Jakarta–Soekarno-Hatta, Surabaya
Smart Aviation	Maratua
Sriwijaya Air	Balikpapan, Makassar
Super Air Jet	Balikpapan
Wings Air	Balikpapan, Samarinda

== Statistics ==
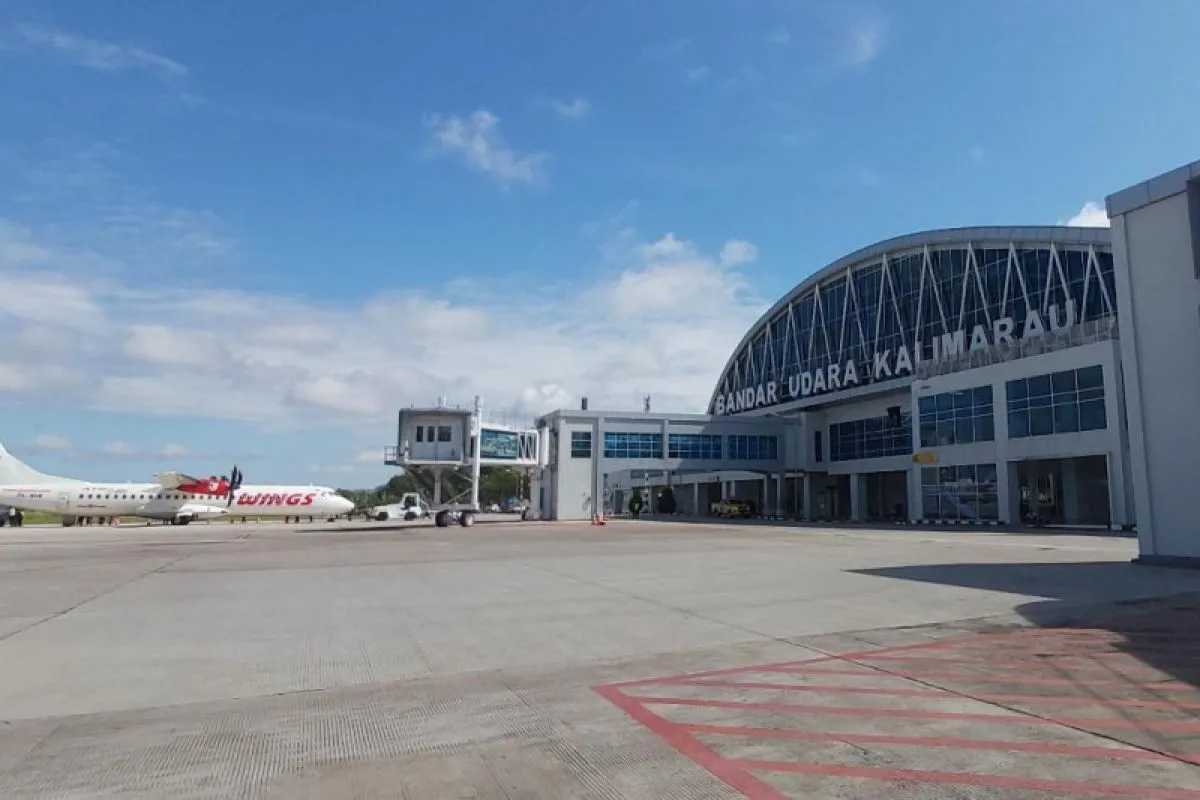
View of the apron, with a Wings Air ATR-72 on standby

Annual passenger numbers and aircraft statistics
Year	Passengers handled	Passenger % change	Cargo (tonnes)	Cargo % change	Aircraft movements	Aircraft % change
2006	119,018	Steady	213	Steady	5,262	Steady
2007	63,250	▼46.9	249	▲16.9	2,142	▼59.3
2008	112,129	▲77.3	272	▲9.2	2,635	▲23.0
2009	133,711	▲19.2	555	▲104.0	3,236	▲22.8
2010	218,826	▲63.7	1,396	▲151.5	4,882	▲50.9
2011	288,519	▲31.8	3,294	▲136.0	4,730	▼3.1
2012	284,020	▼1.6	1,404	▼57.4	4,415	▼6.7
2013	410,895	▲44.7	1,233	▼12.2	6,112	▲38.4
2014	453,240	▲10.3	2,422	▲96.4	7,218	▲18.1
2015	343,528	▼24.2	2,704	▲11.6	5,395	▲25.3
2016	373,164	▲8.6	2,859	▲5.7	5,597	▲3.7
2017	446,921	▲19.8	3,616	▲26.5	6,105	▲9.1
2018	521,222	▲16.6	4,144	▲14.6	7,064	▲15.7
2019	441,737	▼15.2	2,524	▼39.1	6,821	▼3.4
2020	198,777	▼55.0	1,093	▼56.7	3,212	▼52.9
2021	219,166	▲10.3	1,263	▲15.6	2,425	▼24.5
2022	269,498	▲23.0	1,080	▼14.5	4,512	▲86.1
2023	333,458	▲23.7	974	▼9.8	6,069	▲34.5
2024	405,932	▲21.7	1,428	▲46.6	5,482	▼9.7
^{Source: DGCA, BPS}

== Accidents and incidents ==
- On 28 February 2012, a Batavia Air Boeing 737, operating flight Y2654 from Balikpapan, experienced a malfunction with one of its wheels, which nearly detached after landing while taxiing to the apron. As a result, the aircraft was unable to park properly at the apron.
