= Bouraq Indonesia Airlines =

Indonesian airline (1970–2005)

IATA	ICAO	Call sign
BO	BOU	BOURAQ
- Founded: 1970
- Ceased operations: 25 July 2005; 21 years ago
- Hubs: Jakarta–Soekarno-Hatta; Balikpapan; Surabaya
- Subsidiaries: Bali Air
- Fleet size: 70
- Destinations: 10+
- Headquarters: Jakarta, Indonesia
- Key people: Jarry Albert Sumendap (owner)

Bouraq Indonesia Airlines, branded sometimes as Bouraq Airlines or Bouraq, was an airline headquartered in Jakarta, Indonesia, which operated mostly domestic passenger flights out of its bases at Soekarno-Hatta International Airport and Sultan Aji Muhammad Sulaiman Airport.

== History ==
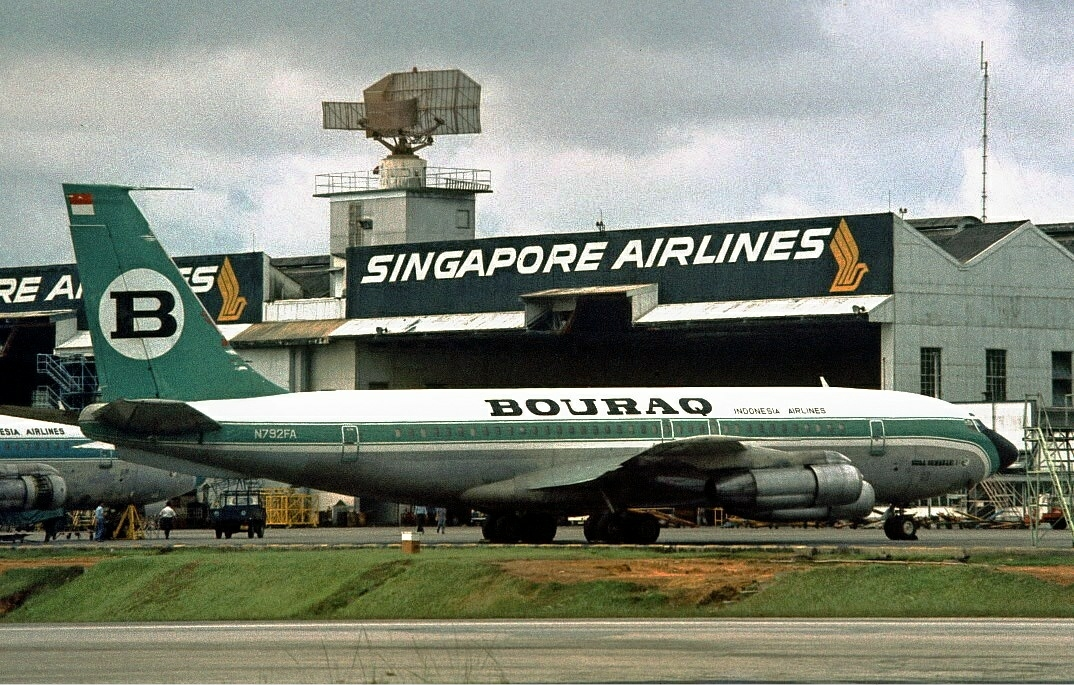
A Bouraq Indonesia Airlines Boeing 707 at Singapore International Airport in 1978.

Bouraq Indonesia Airlines was established in 1970 as a privately owned company by Jarry Albert Sumendap, and it stayed in the possession of his family ever since. It was named for al-Buraq, a flying horse in Muslim tradition. Bali Air was another airline owned by Sumendap, which was co-operating with Bouraq. Initially the airline operated Douglas DC-3s. From 1973 the turboprop Hawker Siddeley HS 748 was introduced on Bouraq services.

Both airlines were shut down in 2005 after prolonged financial problems. The last scheduled Bouraq flight took place in July 2005. The airline licence was later revoked in 2007.

== Destinations ==
=== During the 1980s ===
At that time, Bouraq Airlines offered scheduled flights to the following destinations:

Indonesia

- Balikpapan - Sultan Aji Muhammad Sulaiman Airport (main hub)
- Bandung - Husein Sastranegara International Airport
- Banjarmasin - Syamsudin Noor Airport
- Bima - Bima Airport
- Denpasar - Ngurah Rai International Airport
- Gorontalo - Jalaluddin Airport
- Jakarta - Soekarno–Hatta International Airport (secondary hub)
- Kupang - El Tari Airport
- Luwuk - Bubung Airport
- Manado - Sam Ratulangi International Airport
- Mataram - Selaparang Airport
- Maumere - Wai Oti Airport
- Palangkaraya - Tjilik Riwut Airport
- Palu - Mutiara Airport
- Pangkalan Bun - Iskandar Airport
- Pangkal Pinang - Depati Amir Airport
- Pontianak - Supadio Airport

- Poso - Poso Airport
- Samarinda - Temindung Airport
- Sampit - Sampit Airport
- Semarang - Achmad Yani International Airport
- Surabaya - Juanda International Airport
- Tanjung Redeb - Kalimarau Airport
- Tarakan - Juwata Airport
- Ternate - Babullah Airport
- Toli-Toli - Lalos Airport
- Ujung Pandang - Sultan Hasanuddin International Airport
- Waingapu - Mau Hau Airport
- Yogyakarta - Adisucipto International Airport

Malaysia

- Tawau - Tawau Airport

Philippines

- Davao City - Francisco Bangoy International Airport

Singapore

- Singapore - Singapore Changi Airport

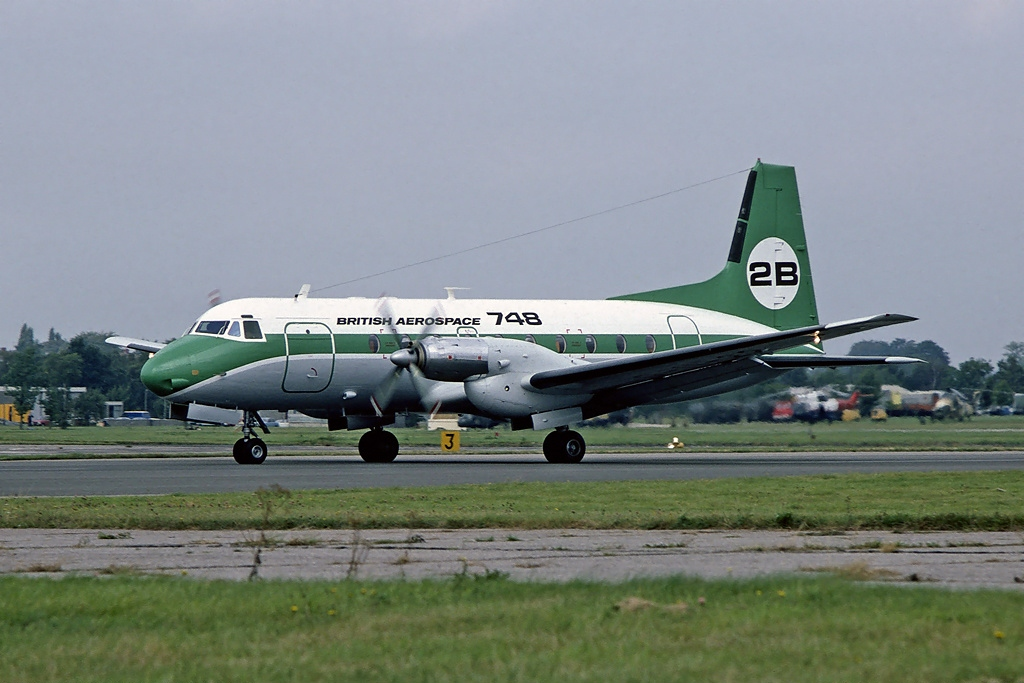
A British Aerospace 748 during the 1982 Farnborough Airshow in the colors of Bouraq Airlines, to which it would later be delivered.

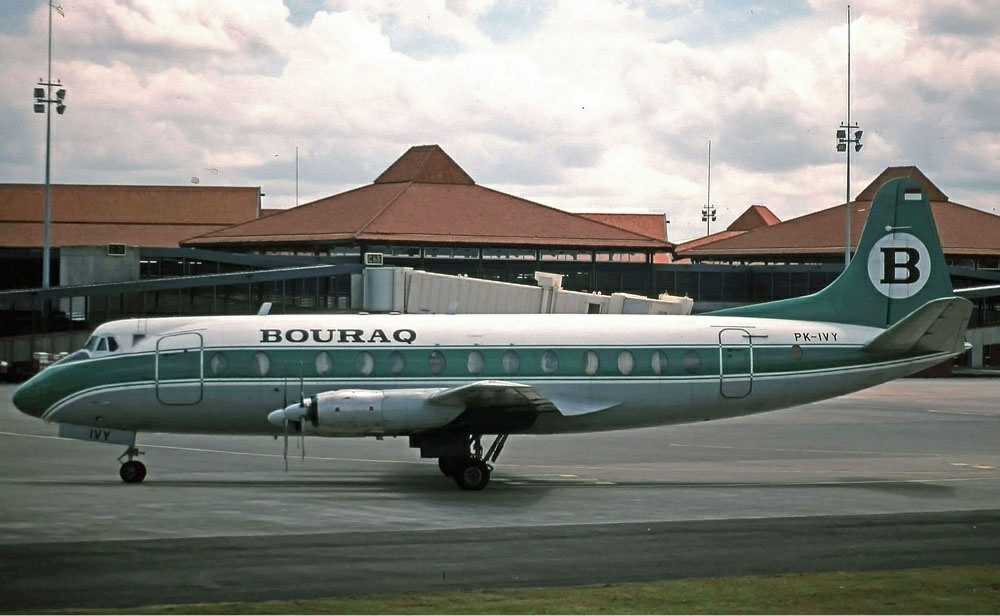
A Vickers Viscount of Bouraq at Soekarno–Hatta International Airport in 1992.

=== During the 2000s ===
Prior to the airline closure, the network had been reduced compared to the 1980s, due to the rising financial problems. In late 2004, Bouraq served the following destinations:

Indonesia

- Balikpapan - Sultan Aji Muhammad Sulaiman Airport (hub)
- Banjarmasin - Syamsudin Noor Airport
- Batam - Hang Nadim Airport
- Denpasar - Ngurah Rai International Airport
- Jakarta - Soekarno–Hatta International Airport (hub)
- Makassar - Sultan Hasanuddin International Airport
- Manado - Sam Ratulangi International Airport
- Palu - Mutiara SIS Al-Jufrie Airport

- Surabaya - Juanda International Airport (hub)
- Tarakan - Juwata Airport
- Ujung Pandang - Sultan Hasanuddin International Airport
- Yogyakarta - Adisucipto International Airport

Singapore

- Singapore - Singapore Changi Airport

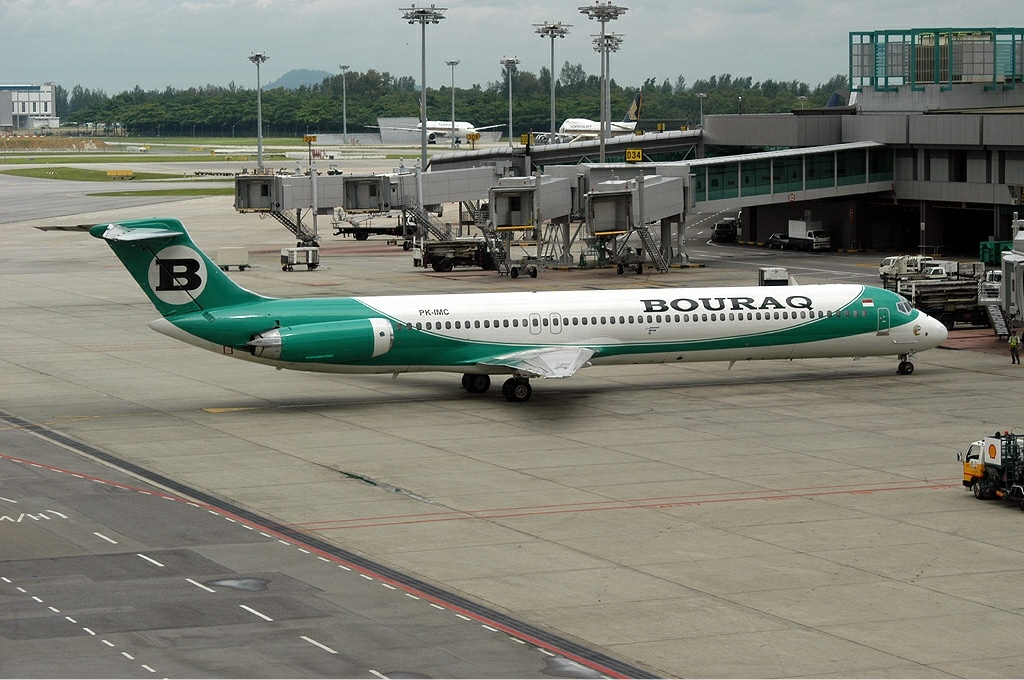
A Bouraq McDonnell Douglas MD-82 at Singapore Changi Airport in 2002.

== Fleet ==
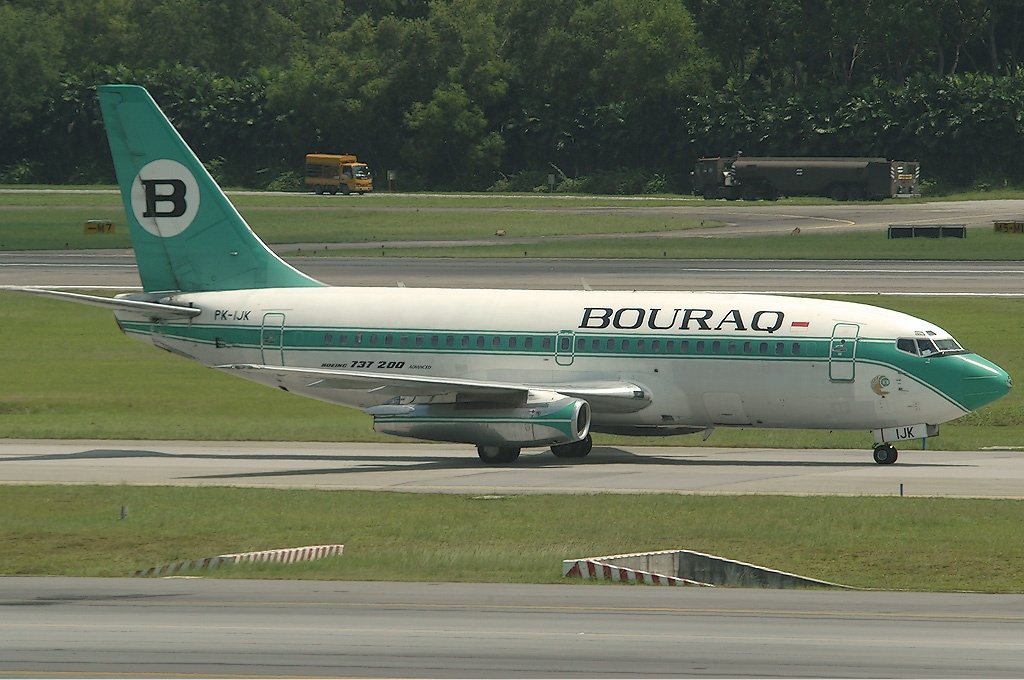
A Boeing 737-200 of Bouraq at Changi Airport in 2004.

Over the years, Bouraq Indonesia Airlines operated the following aircraft types:

Aircraft	Introduced	Retired
Aérospatiale N 262	1975	1976
Boeing 707	1978	1979
Boeing 737-200	1993	2004
BAC One-Eleven		
Douglas DC-3	1970	1985
Fokker F28 Fellowship		
Hawker Siddeley HS 748	1973	2000
McDonnell Douglas MD-82	2002	2005
NAMC YS-11	1971	1978
Vickers Viscount	1980	1990s

== Accidents and incidents ==
=== Fatal ===
- On 26 August 1980 at 06:29 local time, a Vickers Viscount (registered PK-IVS) crashed near Jakarta during a scheduled passenger flight from Banjarmasin which was operated on behalf of Bouraq, killing 31 passengers and 6 crew on board. The pilots had lost control of the aircraft over Tanjung Karawang whilst approaching Kemayoran Airport when the right elevator broke off. It was later determined that the fastenings had exceeded their lifetime by a factor of three without having been substituted during maintenance checkups.
- On 9 January 1993, a Bouraq Hawker Siddeley HS 748 (registered PH-IHE) crashed near Juanda International Airport, killing 11 of the 39 passengers and 4 of the 5 crew on board. The aircraft had just left the airport for a scheduled flight to Banjarmasin, when the right engine had a failure. The pilots tried to return to Juanda Airport, but ultimately failed to do so. The aircraft crashed into a swamp, broke in two and caught fire.
- On 6 August 1995, a Bouraq HS 748 (registered PK-KHL) crashed into Mount Kumawa at a height of 2,800 metres, killing 4 passengers and 6 crew on board. The aircraft had been on a chartered flight from Dumatubin Airport to Kaimana Airport.

=== Non-fatal ===
- On 23 January 1976, a Bouraq Hawker Siddeley HS 748 (registered PK-IHD) was damaged beyond repair in a landing accident at Mutiara Airport. None of the 27 passengers and 5 crew on board were seriously injured.
- On 9 February 1977, another Bouraq HS 748 (this time registered PH-IHK) had to be written off after a hard landing at Sultan Hasanuddin International Airport, which caused the landing gear to collapse. There were no reports concerning any injuries of the 46 passengers and 5 crew on board.
- On 10 December 1982, the nose gear of a Bouraq HS 748 (registered PH-IHI) collapsed upon landing at Sam Ratulangi International Airport, causing the aircraft to veer off the runway. Even though the plane was destroyed, all of the 42 passengers and three crew members survived.
- On 4 July 1988, a Bouraq Vickers Viscount (registered PK-IVW) was damaged beyond economic repair when the starboard and nose gear collapsed during a tailwind landing at Sultan Aji Muhammad Sulaiman Airport. There were no notable injuries among the 71 passengers and 5 crew members on board
- On 4 January 1989, a Bouraq HS 748 suffered extensive damage when the pilots had to perform a belly landing at Syamsudin Noor Airport, following a failure of the landing gears with 47 passengers and five crew on board.
- On 28 August 1992, a Bouraq Vickers Viscount (registered PH-IVX) was destroyed in an engine fire at Syamsudin Noor Airport. The fire started during the take-off run, but the pilots noticed it in time to abort take-off and evacuate the 64 passengers (plus six crew), before the aircraft was engulfed by the flames.
- On 26 September 1994, a Bouraq Viscount (registered PK-IVU) was damaged in a landing accident at Pontianak Airport during a ferry flight with only two pilots on board. The aircraft could be repaired and returned to service.
- On 11 July 1996 at 09:00 local time, Bouraq lost another HS 748 (registered PK-IHN) in a runway overshot at Pattimura Airport. The pilots had to abort the take-off for a scheduled flight to Manado because of an engine failure, but the remaining length of the runway did not suffice to bring the aircraft to a halt, so that it collided with a dyke. There were no serious injuries amongst the 43 passengers and five crew members.
