= Manggar Airfield =

Manggar Airfield
- Manggarbesar Airfield
- Manggar, Indonesia; Near Balikpapan in Indonesia
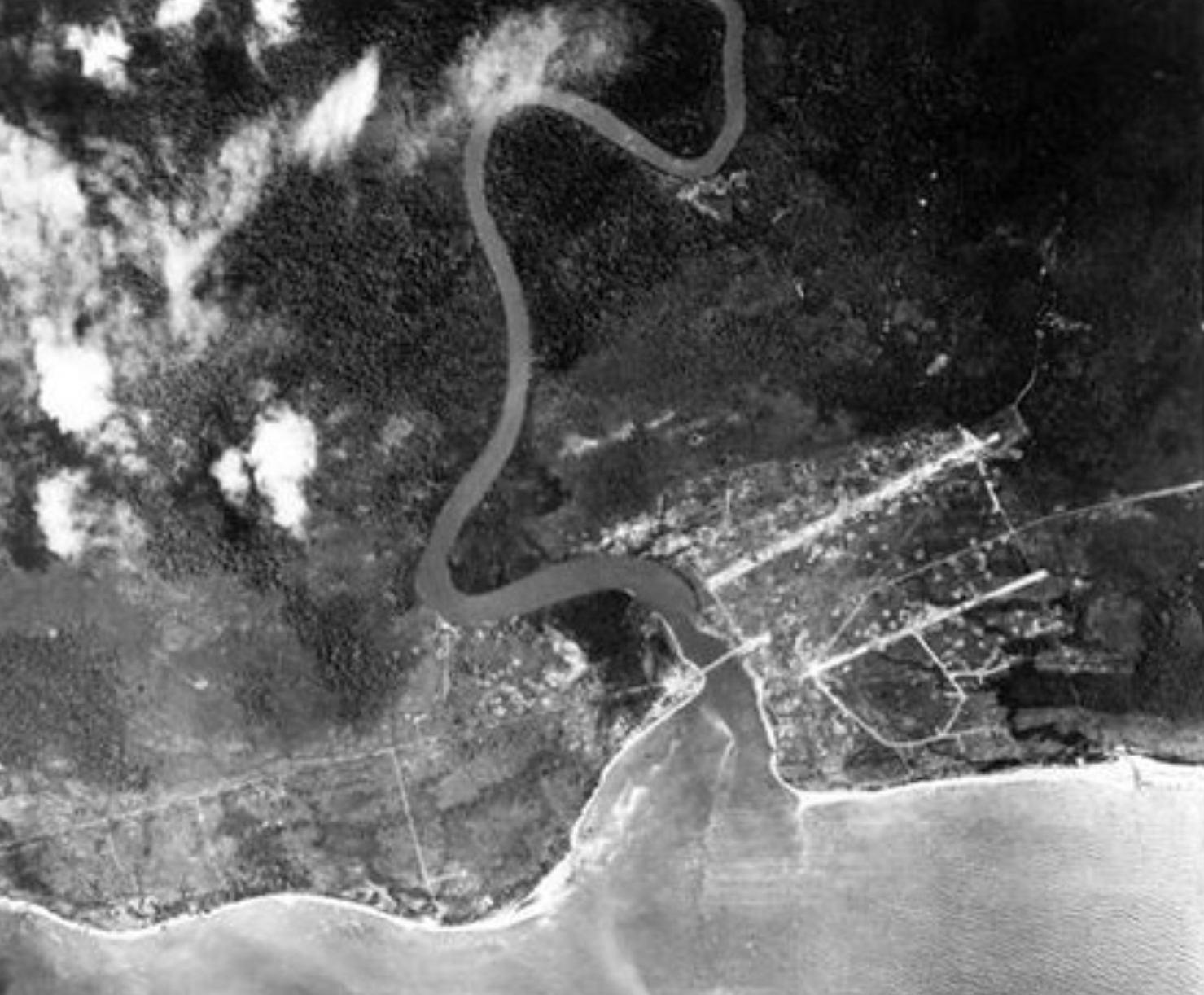
- Aerial reconnaissance photograph of Manggar Airfield, taken in 1944.

Site information
- Type: Airfield
- Operator: Japanese Army
- Controlled by: Japanese Imperial Army, later Australian Army
- Open to the public: No
- Condition: Demolished

Location
- Location within Indonesia
- Coordinates: 1°12′37″S 116°58′31″E

Site history
- Built: 1942
- Built for: Japanese Army Air Force
- Built by: Sakatuchi Detachment
- In use: 1945
- Fate: Captured by Australian Forces
- Battles/wars: Battle of Manggar Airfield

Garrison information
- Occupants: 23rd Air Flotilla, No. 18 Squadron RAAF

Manggar Airfield, also known as Mangar Airfield or Manggarbesar Airfield, was a military airfield which was operational during the Pacific War in World War II. It was operational from 28 January 1942 to 10 July 1945, and has been redeveloped into an urban area since. The airfield was located in Manggar in Balikpapan area of Indonesia.

== History ==
Manggar Airfield was originally built in 1936 under Dutch colonial administration to transport oil and tin. During World War II, Japan had planned to capture the Dutch East Indies, in order to utilize its existing oilfields and also construct an airfield at Manggar, which would be critical for Japan's occupation of Southern Borneo. Following the fall of Tarakan, from 20 to 23 January 1942, the Royal Netherlands East Indies Army Air Force deployed three Lockheed Lodestars to Manggar Airfield for evacuation and resupply flights. BPM personnel and civilians who were still left behind were airlifted to Surabaya.

=== Japanese Capture ===
Following the Japanese victory in the Battle of Balikpapan, the Sakaguchi Detachment began the re-construction of Manggar Airfield on 26 January 1942. Following a bombardment by allied forces, the airfield had to be repaired on 27 January. The next day, nine Mitsubishi A6M Zero fighters of the 23rd Air Flotilla landed at Manggar Airfield, and later set up a headquarters by the 30th. Manggar Airfield was first photographed on 10 October 1944, and was operated by the Imperial Japanese Navy and Japanese Army Air Force. It consisted of two airstrips, and was a major landing ground as it was the largest airfield in the Balikpapan area. In February 1944, the 23rd Air Flotilla relocated the 381st Kokutai to Manggar Airfield, recently equipped with Mitsubishi J2M Raiden Interceptors. The 381st Kokutai stationed two Hikotais at max strength, equipped with 36 front-line fighters and 12 aircraft in reserve. One of these squadrons, S602 had slowly converted to Raidens in the ensuing months, operating less than 10 aircraft during the Balikpapan air battles. The 381st Kokutai also commanded one Hikotai equipped with 8 J1N1-S Gekkos, with 6 aircraft in reserve. The U.S. Strategic Bombing Survey characterized 381 as one of the best fighter groups in the Japanese Navy.

=== Battle of Manggar Airfield ===
On 2 July 1945, the 2/14th Battalion began to advance from the Balikpapan beachhead, and captured a smaller airfield in Sepinggang with little difficulty. On the next day, it continued towards Manggar facing small amounts of resistance before finally arriving on the morning of 4 July. Initially, it appeared undefended as the 2/14th was able to advance a kilometer, however, the Japanese were entrenched in the hills overlooking the airfield. They were armed with two 6-inch coastal guns north of the airfield. The Japanese army had been caught off guard by the Australian army's speed, and their positions were bombarded by artillery and naval gunfire for two days. On the afternoon of 6 July, an attack was ordered and a 13-man patrol was able to seize the heavily fortified coastal guns. In the meantime, other Japanese positions were being heavily bombarded. On the afternoon of 9 July, all Japanese positions were captured with the support of 3 tanks. Manggar Airfield was heavily bombed by liberator aircraft from the United States Air Force. Over 500 rounds of naval gunfire and 12,000 rounds of artillery ammunition had been used for this operation.

=== Aftermath ===
On 10 July, Manggar Airfield was liberated by the Australian Army. Several Japanese aircraft were captured including both Imperial Japanese Navy and Japanese Army Air Force aircraft. In the wreckage included the Mitsubishi Ki-51, and Nakajima Ki-84 presumably from the 7th Air Division HQ, a Kawasaki Ki-48, and a G4M1. Following this, Manggar Airfield was repaired to be used by the Allies, and the No. 18 Squadron RAAF from Batchelor Airfield arrived on 17 July.

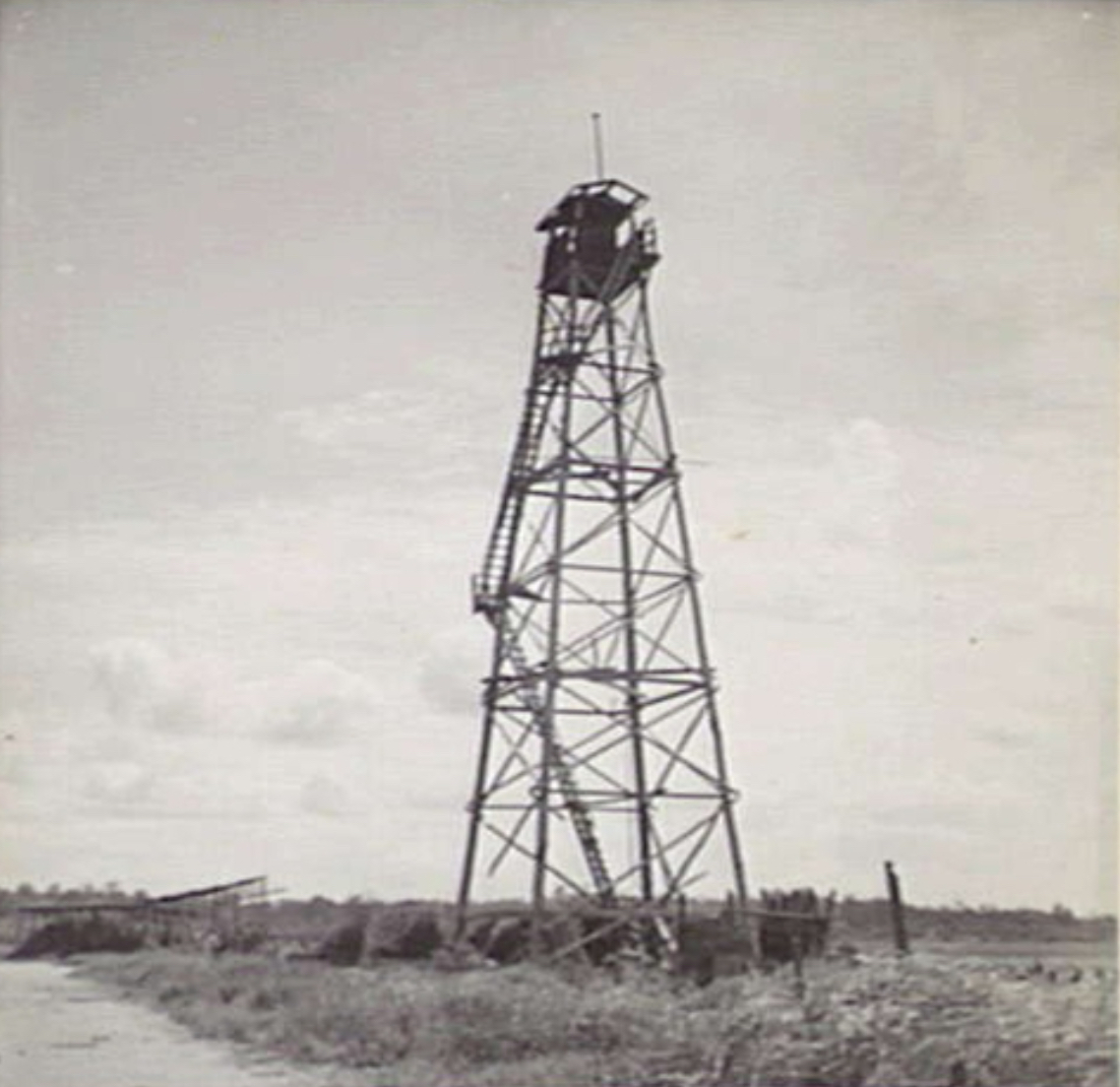
Control tower in Manggar Airfield, taken in 1945.

== American Missions in Manggar Airfield ==
- October 10, 1944 - Aerial reconnaissance mission takes photograph of the airfield.
- October 14, 1944 - 40th Fighter Squadron and eight P-47s from the 41st Fighter Squadron led a sweep over Manggar Airfield, resulting in one loss P-47D. The P-47D was piloted by Lieutenant Wiedmeyer, and it is not known whether he bailed or forced landed. When his aircraft failed to return, it was officially listed as Missing In Action (MIS).
- January 8, 1945 - P-38s attack Manggar Airfield
- February 5, 1945 - B-24s bomb Manggar Airfield
- February 6, 1945 - B-24s with P-38 support attack Manggar Airfield
- February 8, 1945 - B-24s bomb Manggar Airfield
- February 24, 1945 - B-24s bomb Manggar Airfield
- February 26, 1945 - B-24s bomb Manggar Airfield
- March 1, 1945 - B-24s bomb Manggar Airfield.
- March 2, 1945 - B-24s bomb Manggar Airfield.
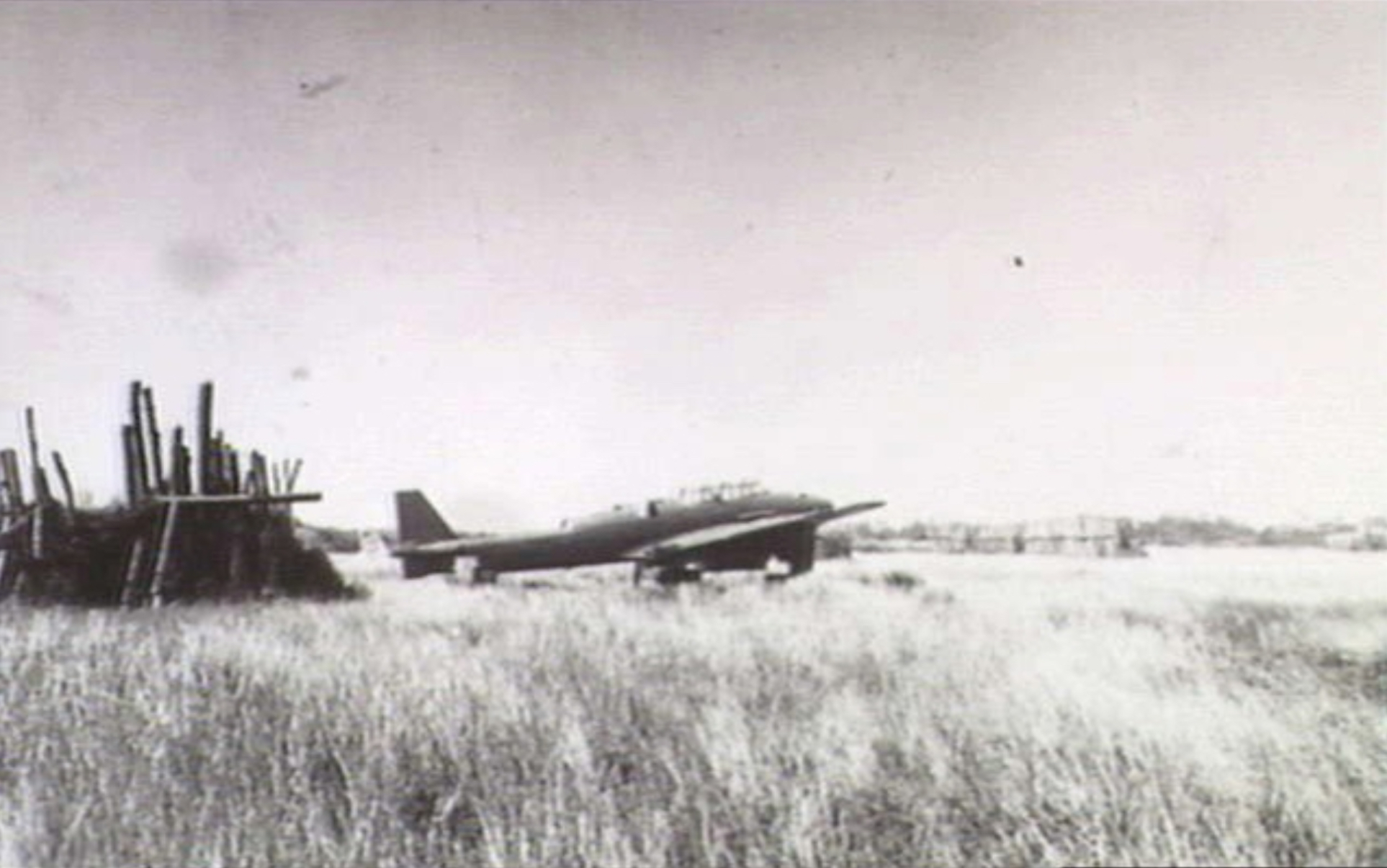
  Damaged naval fighter aircraft Nakajima J1N1-C at Manggar Airfield, taken in 1945.
- April 21, 1945 - B-24s bomb Manggar Airfield.
- April 22, 1945 - B-24s bomb Manggar Airfield.
- April 30, 1945 - B-24s bomb Manggar Airfield.
- May 3, 1945 - Manggar Airfield is heavily hit by B-24s.
- May 16, 1945 - B-24s hit Manggar.
- May 17, 1945 - B-24s bomb Manggar.
- June 4, 1945 - B-24s bomb Manggar and B-25s hit Manggar.
- June 18, 1945 - B-24s hit Manggar Airfield.
- June 21, 1945 - B-24s hit Manggar Airfield.
- June 24, 1945 - B-25s bomb warehouses and the nearby Manggar Airfield.
- June 25, 1945 - B-24s hit Manggar Airfield.
- June 26, 1945 - B-24s and B-25s hit airfield at Manggar.
- June 28, 1945 - B-24s pound installations in the Manggar area.
- July 5, 1945 - B-24s bomb Manggar.
- July 6, 1945 - B-24s bomb Manggar.
- July 9, 1945 - B-24s and P-38s supporting Australian forces, hit Japanese forces in areas near Manggar.

== Present ==
In present day, Manggar Airfield has been redeveloped into an urban area, with no wartime remnants remaining.
