= Bali Air =

Indonesian airline

IATA	ICAO	Call sign
BL	BLN	BIAR
- Founded: 1972
- Commenced operations: 1973
- Ceased operations: 2005
- Operating bases: Soekarno–Hatta International Airport
- Fleet size: 7
- Destinations: same as Bouraq Indonesia Airlines
- Parent company: Bouraq Indonesia Airlines
- Headquarters: Indonesia

Bali Air was an Indonesian airline operated from 1973 to 2005, it was a subsidiary of Bouraq Indonesia Airlines based in Soekarno-Hatta International Airport, Cengkareng. The airline ceased scheduled operations in 2005 after its parent company declared bankruptcy.

== History ==
Formerly known as Bali International Air Service, the airline was established in 1973. It was wholly owned by Bouraq Indonesia Group.

== Destinations ==
- Balikpapan - Sultan Aji Muhammad Sulaiman Airport
- Banjarmasin - Syamsudin Noor Airport
- Batam - Hang Nadim Airport
- Denpasar - Ngurah Rai International Airport
- Jakarta - Soekarno–Hatta International Airport (hub)
- Surabaya - Juanda International Airport
- Yogyakarta - Adisutjipto International Airport
- Jambi - Sultan Thaha Airport
- Pangkal Pinang - Depati Amir Airport
- Padang - Sutan Sjahrir Air Force Base formerly Tabing Intl. Airport
- Ambon - Pattimura Airport

== Fleet ==
The Bali Air fleet consisted of the following aircraft (as of August 2005):

- 2 Vickers Viscount
- 1 Vickers Vanguard
- 1 Fokker F28
- 3 Boeing 737-200
