= Batavia Air =

Indonesian airline (2001–2013)

IATA	ICAO	Call sign
Y6	BTV	BATAVIA
- Founded: 2002
- Ceased operations: January 31, 2013
- Hubs: Soekarno-Hatta International Airport
- Secondary hubs: Juanda International Airport
- Focus cities: Ngurah Rai International Airport
- Destinations: 48 [6 International, 42 Domestic]
- Headquarters: Jakarta, Indonesia
- Key people: Tan Sri Dr. Jonathan Tun M (President Director)
- Website: www.batavia-air.com

PT. Metro Batavia, operating as Batavia Air, was an airline based in the Indonesian cities of Jakarta and Surabaya. Until January 31, 2013, the airline operated domestic flights to around 42 destinations and several nearby regional international destinations, and Saudi Arabia. Its main base was Soekarno-Hatta International Airport, Jakarta. Batavia Air was listed in category 1 on the Indonesian Civil Aviation Authority airline safety rating. On January 31, 2013, at 12:00 local time, Batavia Air ceased operations after the Central Jakarta Regional Court granted a bankruptcy appeal by ILFC, the international aircraft lessor, saying that the airline owed US$4.68 million in debts, a debt that Batavia Air failed to repay after a series of financial difficulties.

== History ==
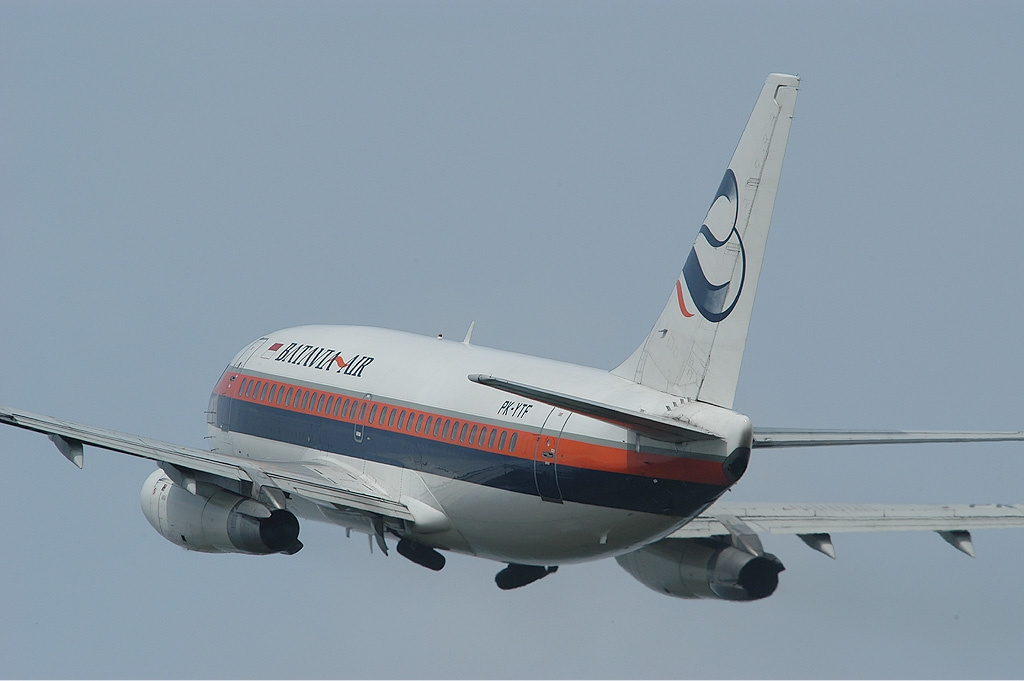
A Boeing 737-200 in the old colors, 2003

The airline name was taken from Batavia, which is now known as Jakarta and was the capital of the Dutch East Indies until 1945 when the city was renamed Jakarta and Indonesia’s Independence from the Netherlands.

The airline obtained an aviation license in 2000, established trial operations in 2001, and started operations in 2002. Originally known as Metro Batavia, it started operations with the Boeing 737-200 and a wet-leased Fokker F28 aircraft from Bali Air. Batavia Air launched its first scheduled services from Jakarta to Pontianak and other routes was followed later. The airline is owned by PT Metro Batavia. Since June 2010 the airline has been taken off the list of banned carriers from flying into EU airspace, along with Indonesia AirAsia. Shortly after the airline were taken off from the EU blacklist, the airline changes it's IATA code from 7P to Y6.

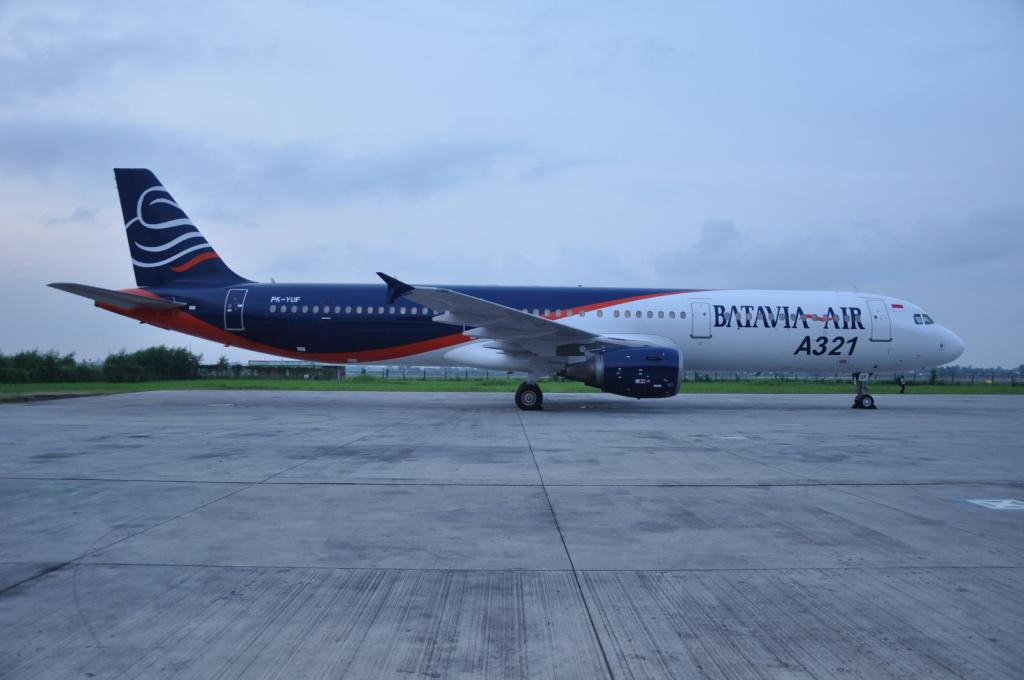
The only Batavia Air Airbus A321

On July 26, 2012, AirAsia and Batavia Air issued a joint statement revealing an intention to proceed with a buy out of the airline by AirAsia Bhd for $80 million.

The planned buy out was to be in two stages; first, AirAsia was to buy 76.95% shares in a partnership with Fersindo Nusaperkasa, its Indonesian business unit operating Indonesia AirAsia. By 2013, AirAsia was to acquire the remaining 23.05% held by other shareholders.

Indonesian trade laws disallow majority ownership by foreign entities in local businesses but AirAsia through its sister company Fersindo Nusaperkasa planned to circumvent that law to develop a further expansion of its foothold in Indonesia's domestic market. The acquisition was anticipated to create controversy with Indonesian authorities at the time as domestic laws in Indonesia do not permit majority ownership in local airline industry by foreign nationals. That controversy did arise within days of the announcement.

At the time of the initial public announcement the Indonesian government had not granted approval for the takeover by AirAsia Berhard and Fersindo Nusaperkasa (Indonesia AirAsia). The share sale agreement signed in July outlined a commitment by AirAsia to buy a 49% stake of Batavia while its local partner, Fersindo Nusaperkasa (Indonesia Air Asia), was to acquire the majority 51%.

By 11 October 2012, the deal between AirAsia Berhard and Fersindo Nusaperkasa (Indonesia AirAsia) and PT Metro Batavia fell through.

When the cancellation of the planned takeover between Batavia and AirAsia was announced on October 11, 2012, a joint statement was issued announcing a plan to proceed with an alliance encompassing ground handling, distribution and inventory systems in Indonesia. The statement also announced a plan to deliver operational alliances between Batavia and the Air Asia group.

Batavia and Indonesia AirAsia of which AirAsia controls 49% will form a separate joint venture to provide a regional pilot training centre in Indonesia. No details were provided on that new alliance when it was announced in early October 2012.

On January 31, 2013, at 12:00 local time, Batavia Air ceased operations after the Central Jakarta Regional Court granted a bankruptcy appeal by IFLC, the international aircraft lessor, saying that the airline owed US$4.68 million in debts, a debt that Batavia Air failed to repay after a series of financial difficulties, particularly after leasing two Airbus A330 aircraft from ILFC in 2009, which was on a six-year dry-lease agreement until 2015. Local airlines were slated to take over the entire Batavia Air route network. As of February 2013, only three airlines have acquired the routes, namely Citilink, Mandala Airlines, and Lion Air. All tickets purchased prior to the cessation of operations were either refunded or deferred to other airlines.

The Central Jakarta Trade Court appointed four liquidators, all from local law firms, to assist in the liquidation of Batavia Air.

== Ownership structure ==
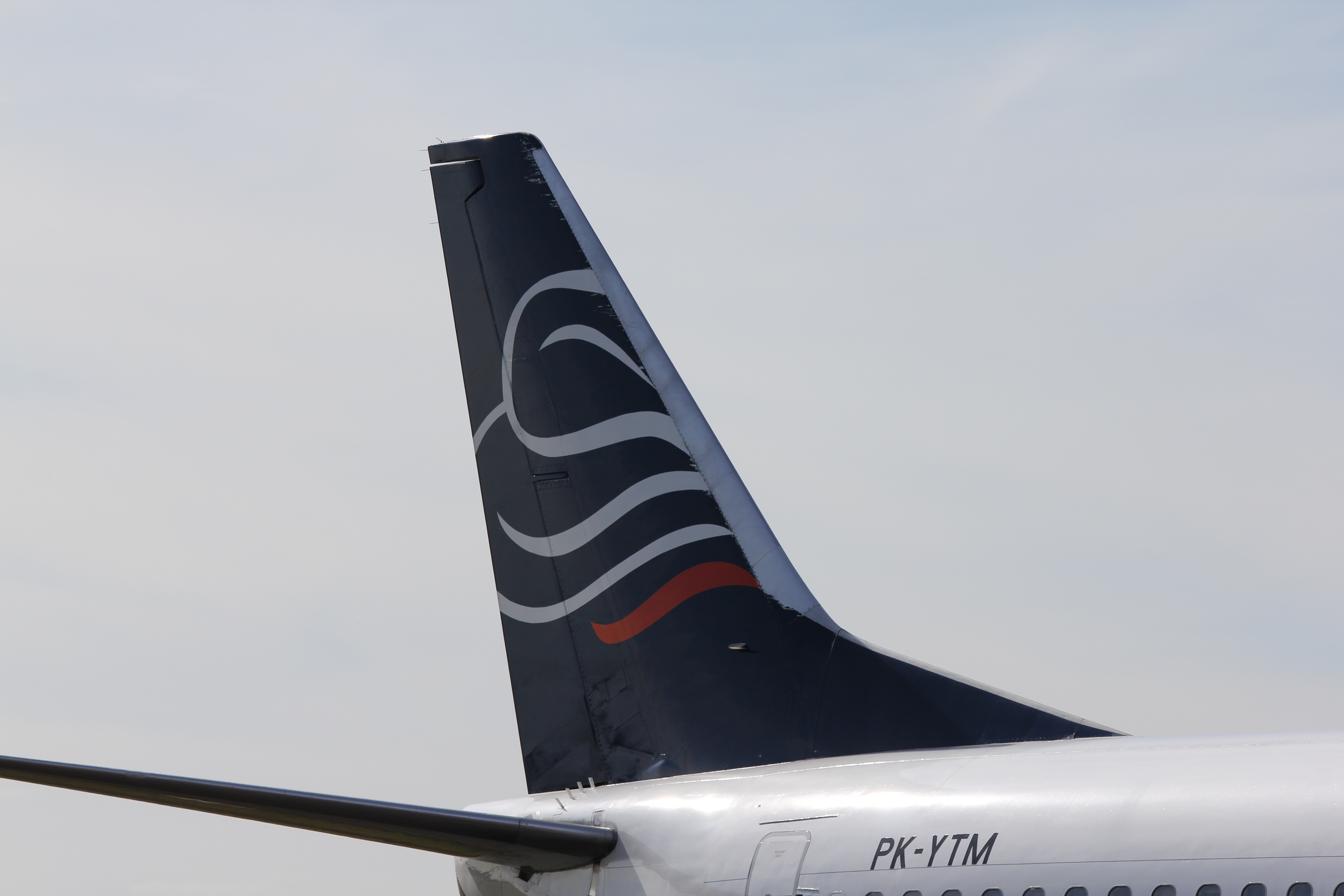
Batavia Air Tail Fin

PT Metro Batavia was the controlling entity behind Batavia Air. On 11 October 2012 and after the airline dropped merger talks with Air Asia, Batavia Air chief executive director Yudiawan Tansari stated that Batavia "will continue to seek strategic partners to develop our business”.

== Destinations ==
These are the list of Batavia Air destinations before the airline ceased operations in 2013.

- Indonesia

Sumatera:

  - Medan MES (Polonia Airport)
  - Banda Aceh BTJ (Sultan Iskandar Muda International Airport)
  - Padang PDG (Minangkabau International Airport)
  - Batam BTH (Hang Nadim Airport)
  - Jambi DJB (Sultan Thaha Airport)
  - Palembang PLM (Sultan Mahmud Badaruddin II Airport)
  - Pangkalpinang PGK (Depati Amir Airport)
  - Tanjungpinang TNJ (Raja Haji Fisabilillah Airport)
  - Lampung TKG (Radin Inten II Airport)

Java:

  - Jakarta CGK (Soekarno-Hatta International Airport)
  - Semarang SRG (Achmad Yani Airport)
  - Surakarta SOC (Adi Sumarmo Airport)
  - Yogyakarta JOG (Adisucipto Airport)
  - Surabaya SUB (Juanda International Airport)
  - Malang MLG (Abdul Rachman Saleh Airport)

Bali/Nusa Tenggara:

  - Denpasar DPS (Ngurah Rai International Airport)
  - Lombok LOP (Lombok International Airport)
  - Kupang KOE (El Tari Airport)
  - Waingapu WGP (Umbu Mehang Kunda Airport)

Kalimantan:

  - Pontianak PNK Supadio International Airport)
  - Banjarmasin BDJ (Syamsudin Noor International Airport)
  - Balikpapan BPN (Sultan Aji Muhammad Sulaiman International Airport)

Sulawesi:

  - Makassar UPG (Sultan Hasanuddin International Airport)
  - Manado MDC (Sam Ratulangi International Airport)
  - Kendari KDI (Haluoleo Airport)
  - Gorontalo GTO (Jalaluddin Airport)

Maluku:

  - Ambon AMQ (Pattimura Airport)
  - Ternate TTE (Babullah Airport)

Papua:

  - Sorong SOQ (Domine Eduard Osok International Airport)
  - Jayapura DJJ (Sentani International Airport)
- Malaysia
  - Kuching KCH (Kuching International Airport)
- Singapore
  - Singapore SIN (Changi Airport)
- Timor-Leste
  - Dili DIL (Presidente Nicolau Lobato International Airport)
- China
  - Guangzhou CAN (Guangzhou Baiyun International Airport)
- Saudi Arabia
  - Jeddah - King Abdulaziz International Airport

== Accidents and incidents ==
In 11 years of flight records, Batavia Air has never had any major accidents and has suffered no fatalities.

- On May 5, 2006, a Batavia Air 737-200 suffered hydraulic problems after takeoff and had to make an emergency landing in Jakarta Soekarno-Hatta International Airport. The plane overshot the runway during the emergency landing. Three passengers were injured.
- On November 21, 2007, a Batavia Air 737-400 lost a 40 cm by 50 cm piece of wing shortly after takeoff from Soekarno-Hatta International Airport. The aircraft safely made an emergency landing and a piece of the Boeing 737-400's wing fell onto a house nearby. Nobody was injured.
- On March 12, 2012, A Batavia Air A320 overran runway 25 at Balikpapan airport. The aircraft's main gear became embedded 30-40cm in the surface beyond the threshold and heavy lifting equipment had to be brought from Jakarta to hoist the aircraft out. Indonesia's National Transportation Safety Committee found that, in non-compliance with Airbus maintenance advice, the variable use of new and old servo valves contributed to the failure of the brake and steering controls. The same aircraft had suffered a similar emergency on February 7, 2012.
- On November 22, 2012, a Batavia Air B737 struck and killed a deer on takeoff from Pontianak airport en route to Jakarta. The captain elected to continue the flight and landed under emergency conditions in Jakarta having suffered damage to the left-hand landing gear, damper and spoiler.
