= Sultan Aji Muhammad Sulaiman Sepinggan Airport =

Airport in Balikpapan, Indonesia

Sultan Aji Muhammad Sulaiman Sepinggan International Airport Bandar Udara Internasional Sultan Aji Muhammad Sulaiman Sepinggan

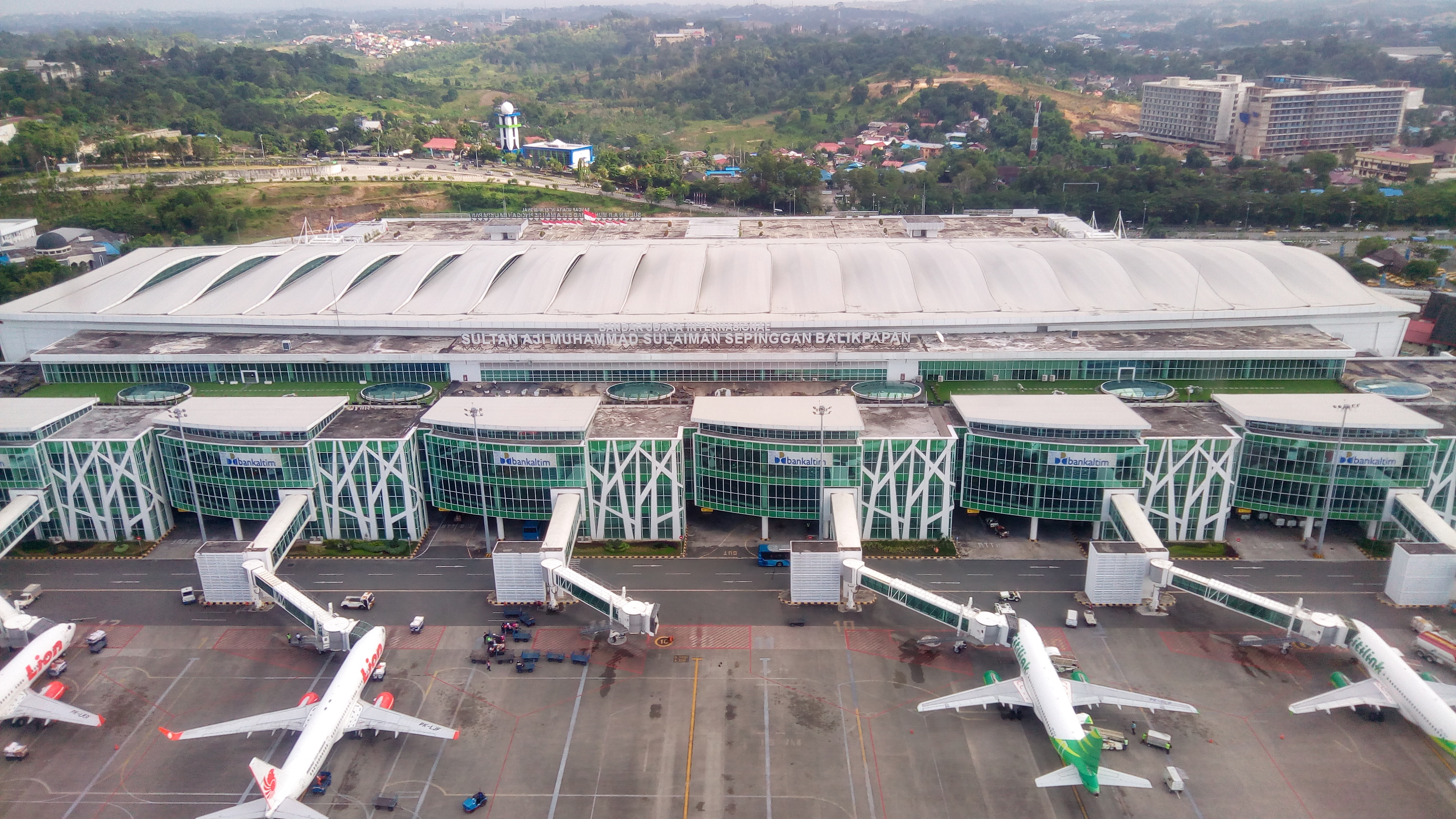
- IATA: BPN; ICAO: WALL; WMO: 96633

Summary
- Airport type: Public / Military
- Owner: Government of Indonesia
- Operator: InJourney Airports
- Serves: Balikpapan
- Location: Balikpapan, East Kalimantan, Indonesia
- Hub for: Citilink; Super Air Jet; Lion Air; Wings Air
- Time zone: WITA (UTC+08:00)
- Elevation AMSL: 12 ft (3.7 m)
- Coordinates: 01°16′06″S 116°53′40″E
- Website: https://www.sepinggan-airport.com/

Maps
- Kalimantan region in Indonesia

- Airport location in East Kalimantan / Indonesia BPN (Indonesia)

Runways
Direction	Length		Surface
Direction	ft	m	Surface
07/25	8,202	2,500	Asphalt

Statistics (2024)
- Passengers: 5,534,519 (▲8.1%)
- Cargo (tonnes): 56,500 (▲15.3%)
- Aircraft movements: 51,090 (▲7.5%)
- Source: DGCA

Sultan Aji Muhammad Sulaiman Sepinggan International Airport (IATA: BPN, ICAO: WALL), formerly named and still commonly known as Sepinggan Airport, is an international airport serving the city of Balikpapan and adjacent areas of East Kalimantan, located in Kalimantan, Indonesia. The airport is named after Aji Muhammad Sulaiman (1838–1899), a former ruler of the Kutai Kertanegara Sultanate. Covering an area of 300 hectares (740 acres), it serves as the primary gateway to Balikpapan and East Kalimantan, and is the largest airport in the region. In the future, the airport will serve as one of the main gateways to Indonesia’s new capital city, Nusantara, and will be connected to it via a toll road. The airport functions as a key regional hub, offering regular domestic flights to major Indonesian cities such as Jakarta, Surabaya, and Denpasar, along with international routes to Singapore, Malaysia, and Brunei. In 2018, Airports Council International named it the second-best airport in the world for service quality among those handling 5 to 15 million passengers annually. Due to its single runway extending into a densely built-up area, landings at the airport are often described as both visually dramatic and technically challenging for pilots.

In addition to its role as a commercial airport, it also hosts Dhomber Air Force Base, a Type-B facility operated by the Indonesian Air Force.

== History ==
=== World War II ===
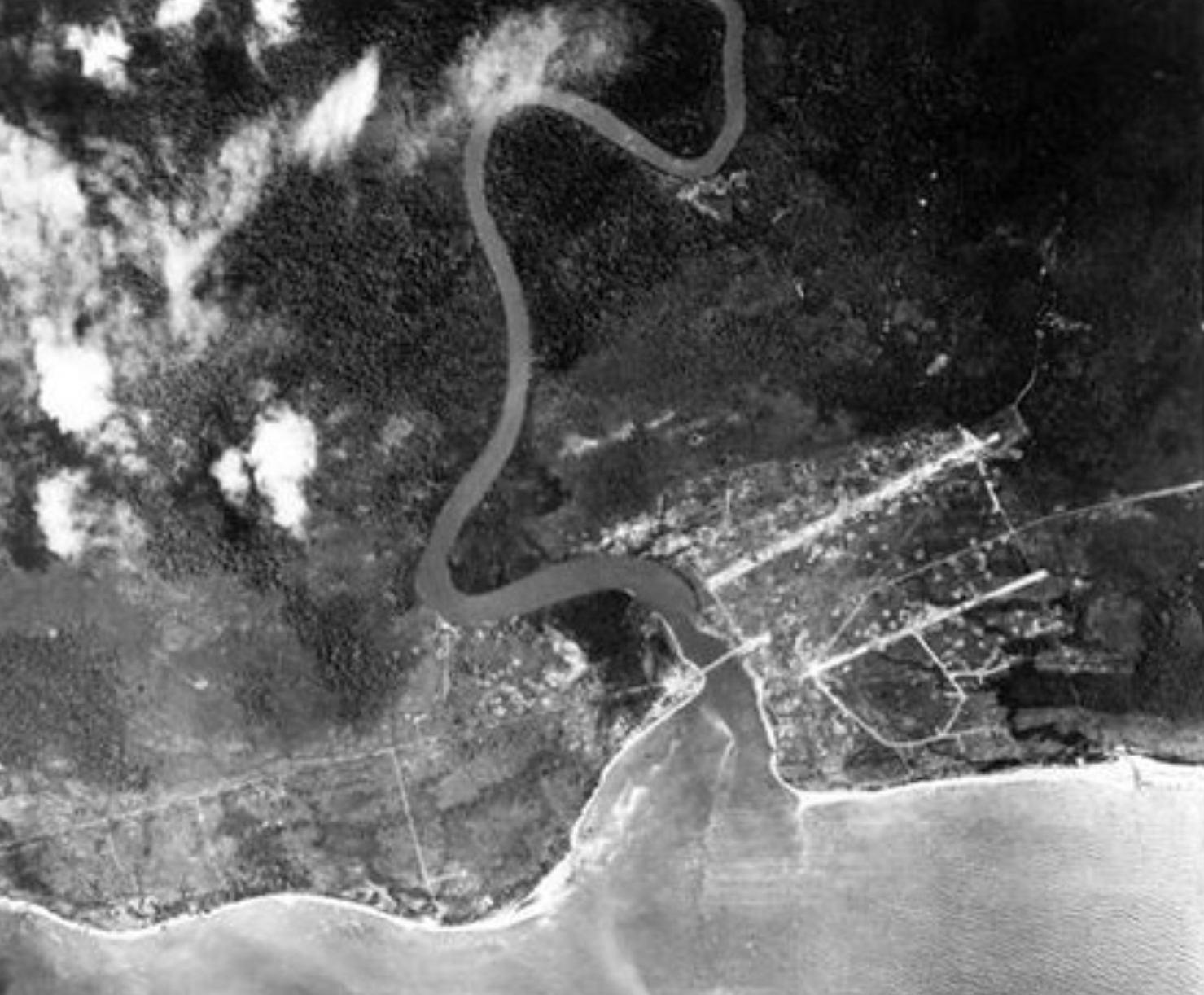
Aerial view of Manggar Airfield, the former principal airport of Balikpapan prior to the construction of Sepinggan Airport

Prior to the war, the Dutch colonial government had already constructed another airfield in Manggar, which was used for commercial flights. In the 1930s, Balikpapan was identified as a strategic oil city in the Dutch East Indies and became part of early plans to develop international air routes between the Philippines and Java. Both Balikpapan and Tarakan were selected as key landing points, prompting airfield construction in the region, with Balikpapan’s development progressing relatively quickly. Although early progress experienced delays and periods of neglect, the Manggar Airfield near Balikpapan was completed and became operational in 1936, later serving Koninklijke Nederlandsch-Indische Luchtvaart Maatschappij (KNILM), the flag carrier of the Dutch East Indies, as well as military flights of the Royal Netherlands East Indies Army Air Force (ML-KNIL). Its importance grew as part of planned regional routes linking Java, Borneo, and New Guinea, as well as connections toward the Philippines via transit stops. During the late 1930s, the airfield saw increasing military and civilian activity, including visits by colonial military aircraft and officials. Due to Balikpapan’s strategic importance, particularly its oil resources, the city became an early target of Japanese forces during World War II. On 23 January 1942, Japanese troops landed in Balikpapan. Within days, Dutch forces collapsed. After securing the urban area, Japanese forces carried out mopping-up operations against remaining Dutch resistance and began rehabilitating Manggar Airfield on 26 January. The airfield was repaired on 27 January, and the following day nine Mitsubishi A6M Zero fighters of the 23rd Air Flotilla of the Imperial Japanese Navy landed there. By 30 January, the unit had established its headquarters at the airfield.

To strengthen their military presence in Balikpapan and its surrounding areas, the Japanese built another airfield in 1942 to support their operational needs. This development was driven by the strategic importance of Balikpapan’s oil refineries. Originally named Sepinggan Airfield, it was named after the local area. The word Sepinggan comes from the phrase satu pinggan, with satu meaning "one" and pinggan meaning "large plate"—a symbol of unity and familial togetherness among the people of Balikpapan. The term originates from the Paser language, spoken by the Paser people who inhabit the coastal areas from Balikpapan Bay to Adang Bay, as well as the upstream regions of the Meratus Mountains. From 8 January to 9 July 1945, the airfield was heavily bombarded by Allied forces during the Battle of Balikpapan. On 2 July 1945, the Australian Army’s 2/14th Battalion captured the airfield with minimal resistance and immediately began repairs. The next day, on 3 July, the first Royal Australian Air Force (RAAF) Auster aircraft took off from the airfield. It remained in use by Allied forces until the end of the Pacific War. After the war, Manggar Airfield gradually fell into disuse, and development shifted to Sepinggan Airport due to its closer proximity to Balikpapan’s city center. The former site of Manggar Airfield has since been repurposed as an Indonesian Army base.

=== Post-war era ===
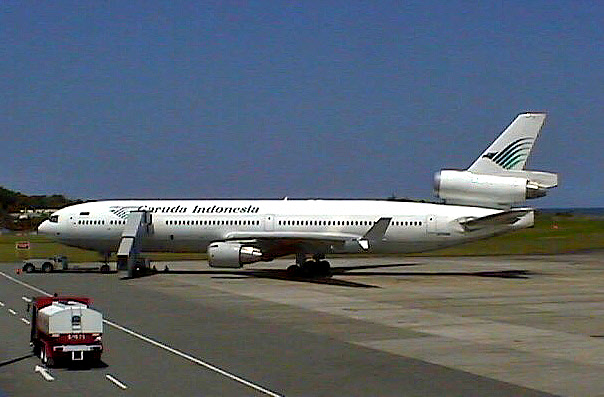
A Garuda Indonesia McDonnell Douglas MD-11 at Sepinggan Airport, 2001

Following the end of the war and the Dutch withdrawal from the region, the airport was transferred to the Indonesian authorities. In 1960, its management was handed over to the Bureau of Civil Aviation (now the Directorate General of Civil Aviation), marking its transition into a public and commercial airport. That same year, the airport was redeveloped to accommodate aircraft such as the Convair CV-240.

By the 1970s, the airport had a 1,700 m runway, which at the time could accommodate only aircraft such as the Fokker F27 and C-130 Hercules. Despite its limited runway capacity, the airport was already regarded as a major gateway to Kalimantan and one of the busiest in Indonesia, with aircraft taking off or landing as frequently as once every 10 minutes. At the time, the airport reportedly had a higher frequency of aircraft takeoffs and landings than Ngurah Rai International Airport in Denpasar, Polonia International Airport in Medan, and Juanda International Airport in Surabaya.

On 9 January 1987, management was again transferred, this time to Perum Angkasa Pura I, which later became PT Angkasa Pura I and then InJourney Airports.

A major renovation of the airport was carried out between 1991 and 1997 in two phases. The first phase, which began in 1991 and was completed in 1994, involved the renovation of the taxiway and passenger and cargo terminals, as well as the extension of the runway to accommodate wide-body aircraft such as the McDonnell Douglas DC-10 and Airbus A300. In 1995, the Indonesian government designated Sepinggan Airport as the fifth Indonesian hajj embarkation airport for the Kalimantan region, which also includes West Kalimantan, Central Kalimantan, and South Kalimantan provinces. The second phase of renovations, which started in 1996, included upgrades to the hangars, fuel depots, and administrative buildings. The renovation was completed in 1997 and officially inaugurated by Indonesia's then-president, Suharto.

=== Contemporary era ===
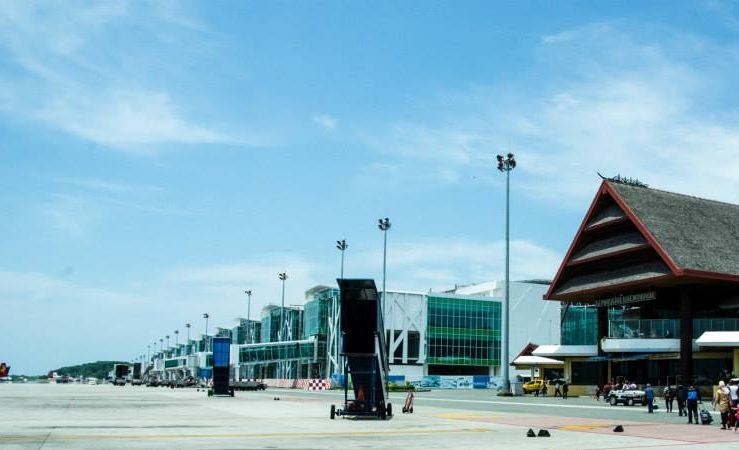
View of the old and new terminals

Due to overcapacity, with the old terminal capable of handling only 1.7 million passengers annually despite serving 7.1 million passengers in 2013, a new terminal was constructed at a cost of approximately 2 trillion rupiah. The construction, which took about three years from 2011 to 2014, resulted in a terminal with a capacity of 10 million passengers annually—more than five times the size of the old terminal. The new terminal began operations on 23 March 2014 and was officially inaugurated by then-president Susilo Bambang Yudhoyono on 16 September 2014.

The opening of the new terminal coincided with the renaming of the airport to its current name, in honor of Aji Muhammad Sulaiman—a 19th-century ruler of the Kutai Kertanegara Sultanate who played a key role in initiating oil exploration in the area, helping to establish it as one of Indonesia’s wealthiest regions. The renaming had long been proposed by the then-governor of East Kalimantan, Awang Faroek Ishak. This name is the result of an agreement between the Regional Leadership Coordination Forum (FKPD) of East Kalimantan, the FKPD of Balikpapan, the Government of Kutai Kartanegara Regency, and the Government of Paser Regency, following public debate and controversy surrounding the change or addition of the airport’s name.

For many years, the airport has faced several incidents involving employees stealing from checked baggage. In 2022, Indonesian singer Dewi Persik also found that her possessions had been stolen after she had left from Balikpapan.

== Facilities and development ==
=== Facilities ===
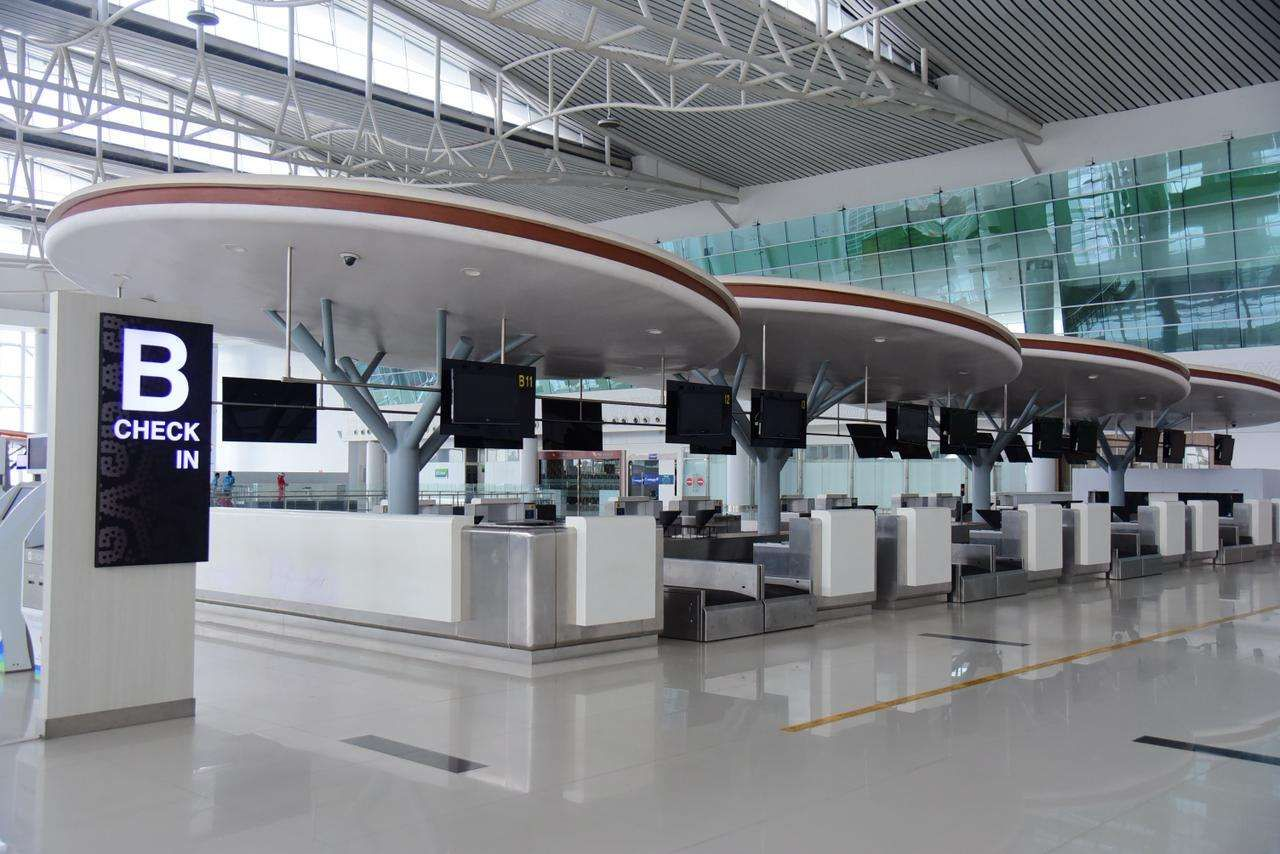
Check-in counters

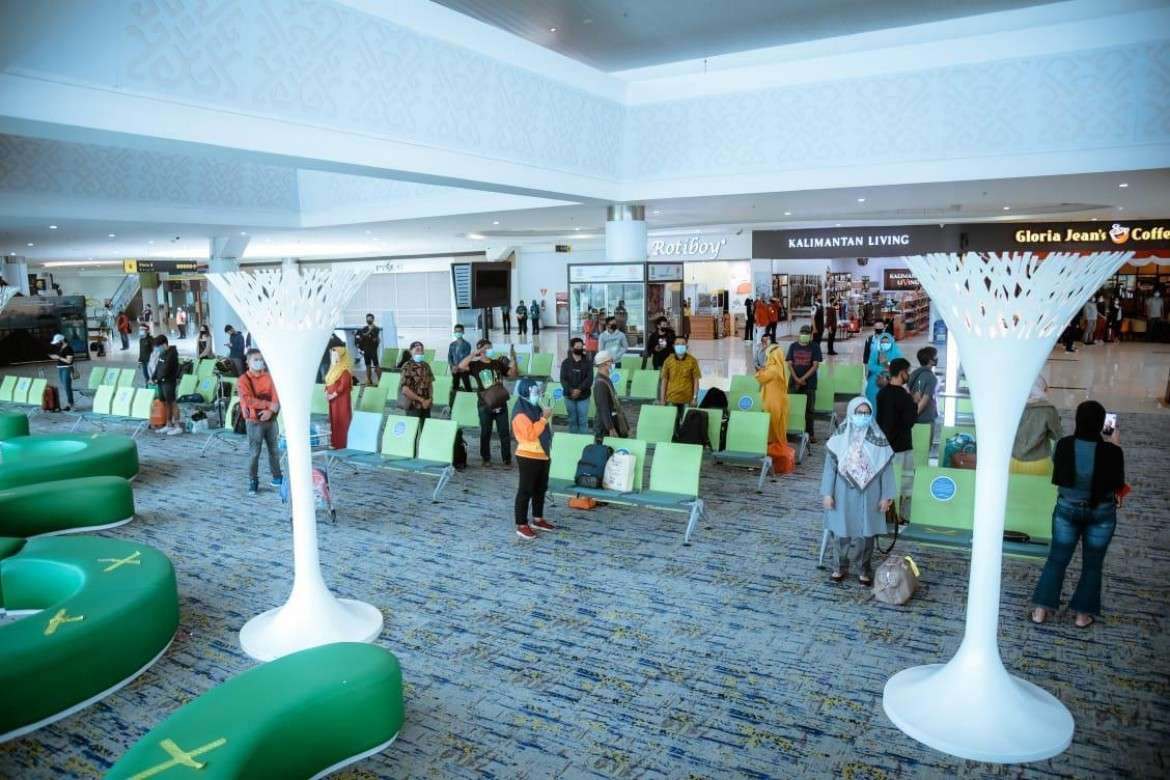
Boarding gate

The current terminal, covering 110,000 square meters (1,200,000 square feet), was tested on 22 March 2014 and built with an investment of approximately Rp2 trillion (US$178 million). Designed to accommodate up to 10 million passengers annually, it was constructed to address severe overcapacity—7.1 million passengers used the airport in 2013, far exceeding the old terminal's capacity of just 1.7 million. Officially opened on 15 September 2014, the new facility made Sultan Aji Muhammad Sulaiman Sepinggan International Airport one of the largest in eastern Indonesia. Branded as an eco-airport, the terminal features a water recycling plant, energy-efficient air conditioning, 11 jet bridges, 74 check-in counters, 8 baggage carousels, a 140,900 square meter (1,517,000 square foot) apron, and a multi-story parking facility with space for 2,300 vehicles. However in 2018, Angkasa Pura revealed that Sultan Aji Muhammad Sulaiman Airport wastes a significant amount of electricity. The airport uses around 4 MW of electricity daily just for air conditioning, which accounts for more than half of its operating cost. The parking building also has high energy consumption due to its design. The airport generates around 12 tons of trash daily.

=== Future development ===
With the development of Nusantara—Indonesia’s new capital city located near Balikpapan—there have been proposals to extend the airport’s runway from its current length of 2,500 meters, which currently accommodates medium-sized aircraft such as the Airbus A330, to 3,250 meters to allow for wide-bodied aircraft like the Boeing 777 and to anticipate increasing air traffic. The extension is expected to be completed before 2030. Due to limited available land surrounding the airport, the runway extension is expected to involve land reclamation in areas around the existing runway. The extension will be able to increase the number of aircraft movements from 22 slots per hour to 40 slots per hour. In addition to managing aircraft flow, the runway will also be equipped with several exit taxiways leading to the apron. Terminal development will also include both the old and new terminals.

According to the original masterplan, the old terminal will be renovated and reused, while the required land has reportedly already been acquired by the local government and is ready for construction. However, in 2026, the government announced a new proposal to repurpose the old terminal as a cultural museum and a venue for showcasing local UMKM (micro, small, and medium enterprises).

With the completion of the terminal expansion and development, the airport is expected to accommodate up to 30 million passengers annually.

On 20 January 2024, the Indonesian Ministry of Transportation and Japan’s Ministry of Land, Infrastructure, Transport and Tourism held negotiations on the potential for joint operation and development of the airport. Four Japanese companies—Japan Airport Terminal, JALUX, Taisei Corporation, and SECOM—have expressed interest in jointly operating the airport. These companies already have extensive experience in the construction and operation of major airports in Japan, including Haneda Airport and Narita Airport, as well as several international airports such as Beijing Capital International Airport in China and Chinggis Khaan International Airport in Mongolia.

== Airlines and destinations ==
=== Passenger ===
Airlines	Destinations
AirAsia	Kuala Lumpur–International
Batik Air	Jakarta–Soekarno-Hatta, Makassar, Pontianak
Citilink	Bandung–Husein Sastranegara, Banjarmasin, Jakarta–Soekarno-Hatta, Makassar, Surabaya, Tarakan, Yogyakarta–International
FlyJaya	Bone
Garuda Indonesia	Jakarta–Soekarno-Hatta
Lion Air	Batam, Denpasar, Makassar, Medan, Semarang, Surabaya, Yogyakarta–International
Malaysia Airlines	Kuala Lumpur–International
Pelita Air	Jakarta–Soekarno-Hatta, Surabaya, Yogyakarta–International
Royal Brunei Airlines	Bandar Seri Begawan
Scoot	Singapore
Sriwijaya Air	Tanjung Redeb
Super Air Jet	Bandung–Husein Sastranegara (begins 3 December 2026), Jakarta–Soekarno-Hatta, Lombok, Makassar, Manado, Semarang, Surabaya, Tanjung Redeb, Tarakan, Yogyakarta–International
Wings Air	Banjarmasin, Malinau, Mamuju, Melak, Palangkaraya, Palu, Tanjung Redeb, Tanjung Selor

== Statistics ==
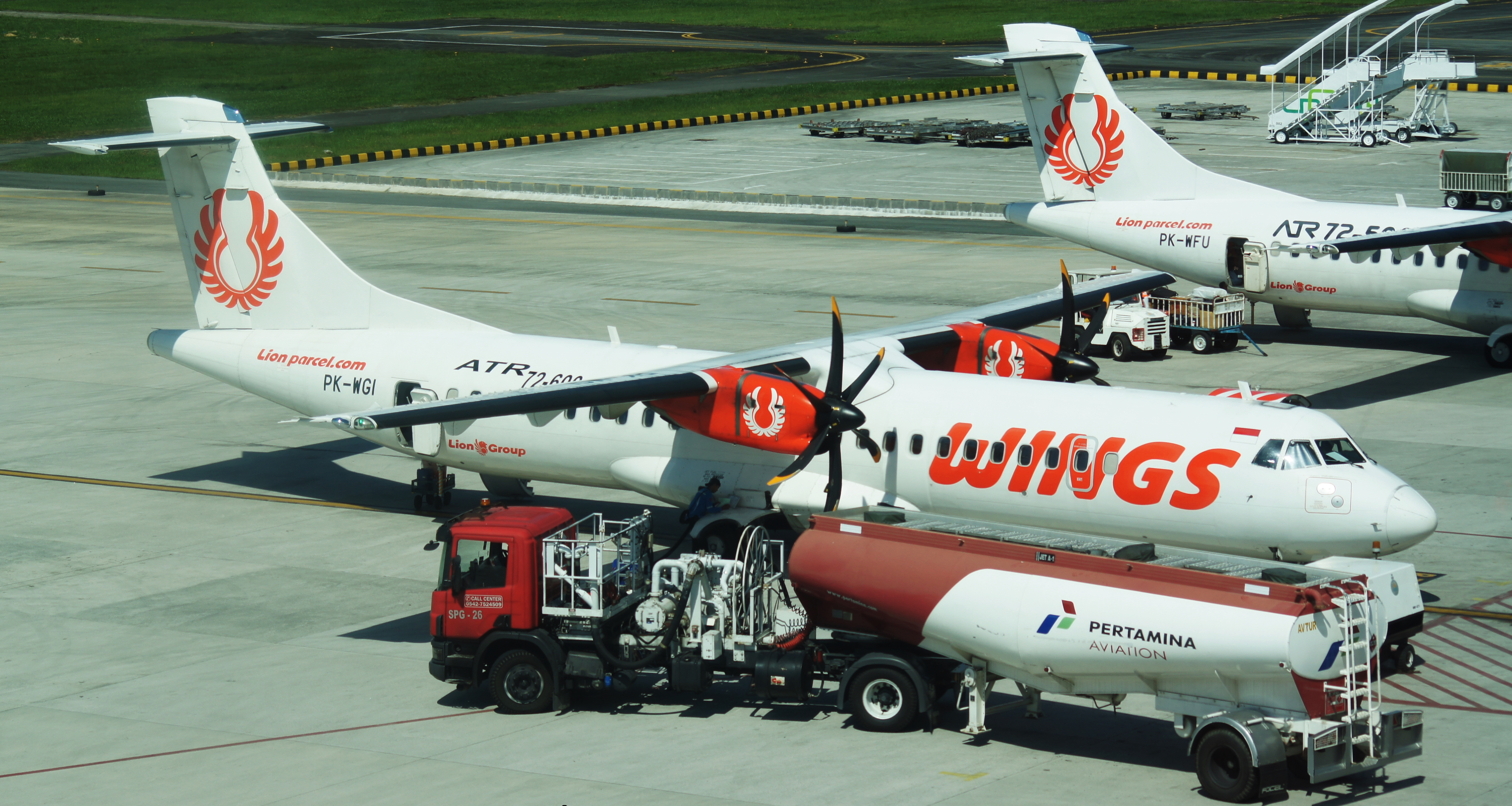
Wings Air ATR-72s at Sultan Aji Muhammad Sulaiman Sepinggan Airport

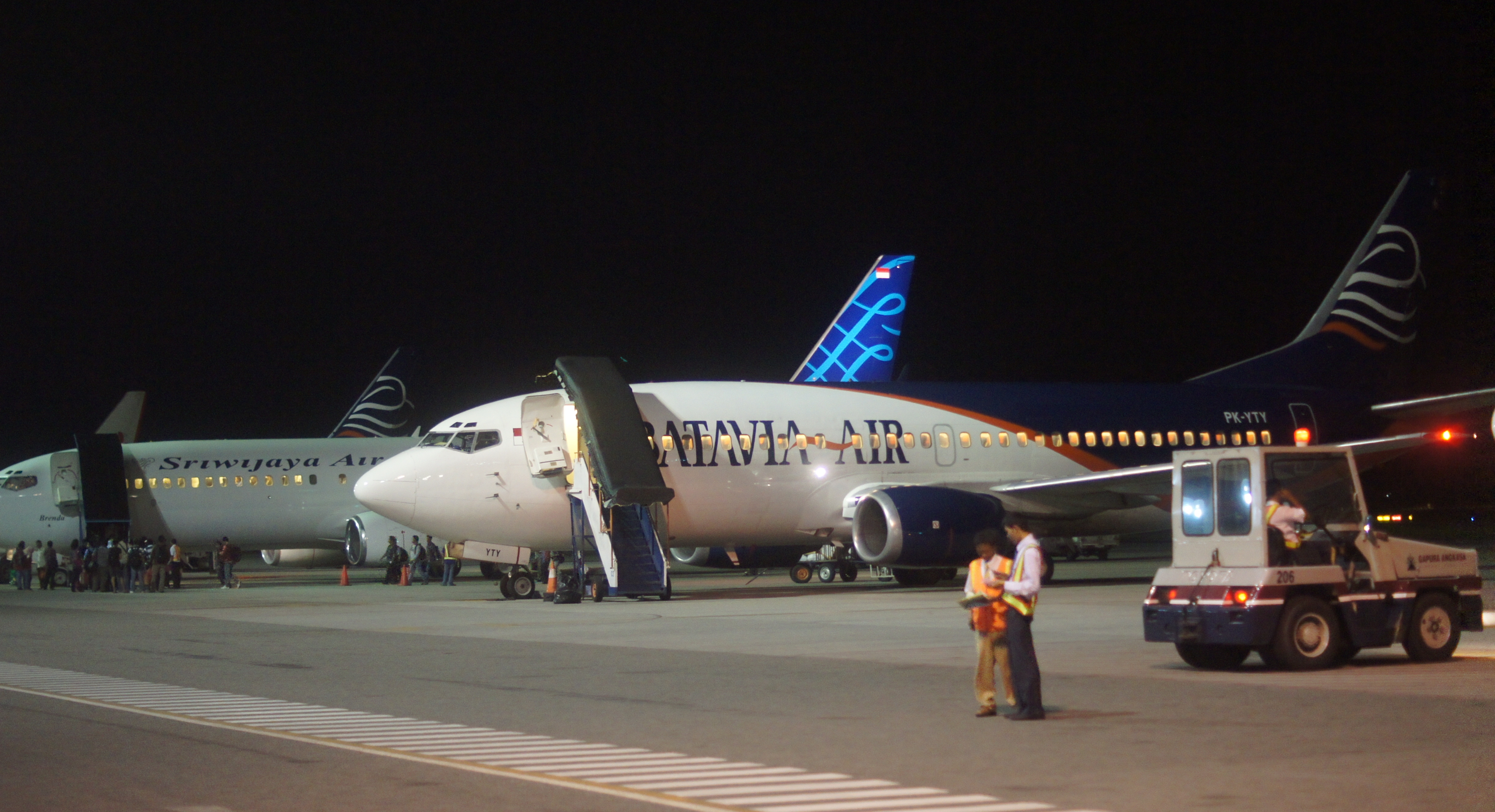
Batavia Air Boeing 737-300 at Sultan Aji Muhammad Sulaiman Sepinggan Airport, 2012

Annual passenger numbers and aircraft statistics
Year	Passengers handled	Passenger % change	Cargo (tonnes)	Cargo % change	Aircraft movements	Aircraft % change
2002	1,393,336	Steady	16,971	Steady	33,972	Steady
2003	1,861,090	▲33.6	15,475	▼8.8	40,192	▲18.3
2024	2,202,668	▲18.4	10,082	▼4.8	40,165	▼0.1
2025	2,453,437	▲11.4	28,698	▲184.6	40,880	▲1.8
2006	2,872,768	▲17.1	23,814	▼17.0	43,854	▲7.3
2007	3,165,211	▲10.2	26,080	▲9.5	45,520	▲3.8
2008	3,534,088	▲11.7	24,149	▼7.4	47,808	▲5.0
2009	4,311,310	▲22.0	31,568	▲30.7	49,792	▲4.1
2010	5,105,031	▲18.4	37,973	▲20.3	57,109	▲14.7
2011	5,680,961	▲11.3	45,125	▲18.8	63,387	▲11.0
2012	6,132,952	▲8.0	51,752	▲14.7	72,817	▲14.9
2013	7,195,016	▲17.3	48,433	▼6.4	78,486	▲7.8
2014	7,751,216	▲7.7	57,728	▲19.2	68,470	▼12.8
2015	7,374,517	▼4.9	54,404	▼5.8	68,370	▼0.1
2016	7,518,437	▲2.0	53,644	▼1.4	70,400	▲3.0
2017	7,380,350	▼1.8	54,568	▲1.7	66,254	▼5.9
2018	7,548,741	▲2.3	61,901	▲13.4	68,415	▲3.3
2019	5,429,716	▼28.1	44,519	▼28.1	56,765	▼17.0
2020	2,748,791	▼49.4	45,865	▲3.0	32,716	▼42.4
2021	2,610,230	▼4.0	52,197	▲13.8	29,269	▼10.5
2022	3,533,439	▲35.4	47,501	▼9.0	38,196	▲30.5
2023	5,118,328	▲44.9	48,985	▲31.0	47,517	▲24.4
2024	5,534,519	▲8.1	56,500	▲15.3	51,090	▲7.5
^{Source: DGCA, BPS}

== Ground transportation ==
=== Bus ===
Shuttle buses connect the airport to various cities and towns, including Batulicin, Tenggarong, Sangata, Bontang, Wahau, Melak, and Samarinda. Additionally, DAMRI operates buses to the new capital city, Nusantara, via the Batu Ampar terminal. For local travel within Balikpapan, the airport is served by Corridor A of the Balikpapan City Trans, which connects the airport to Semayang Harbor.

=== Taxis ===
Bluebird, Primkopau, and Aerocab taxis are available at the airport for travel within Balikpapan. For trips to other cities, Primkopau and Aerocab provide services to towns such as Samarinda, Bontang, Muara Badak, and the new capital, Nusantara. Additionally, Gojek and Grab can be booked directly at the airport terminal.

== Accidents and incidents ==
- On 4 July 1988, Vickers Viscount PK-IVW of Bouraq Indonesia Airlines was damaged beyond economic repair when the starboard and nose gear collapsed during a tailwind landing.
