= Jenderal Ahmad Yani International Airport =

Airport serving Semarang, Central Java, Indonesia

Jenderal Ahmad Yani International Airport Bandar Udara Internasional Jenderal Ahmad Yani

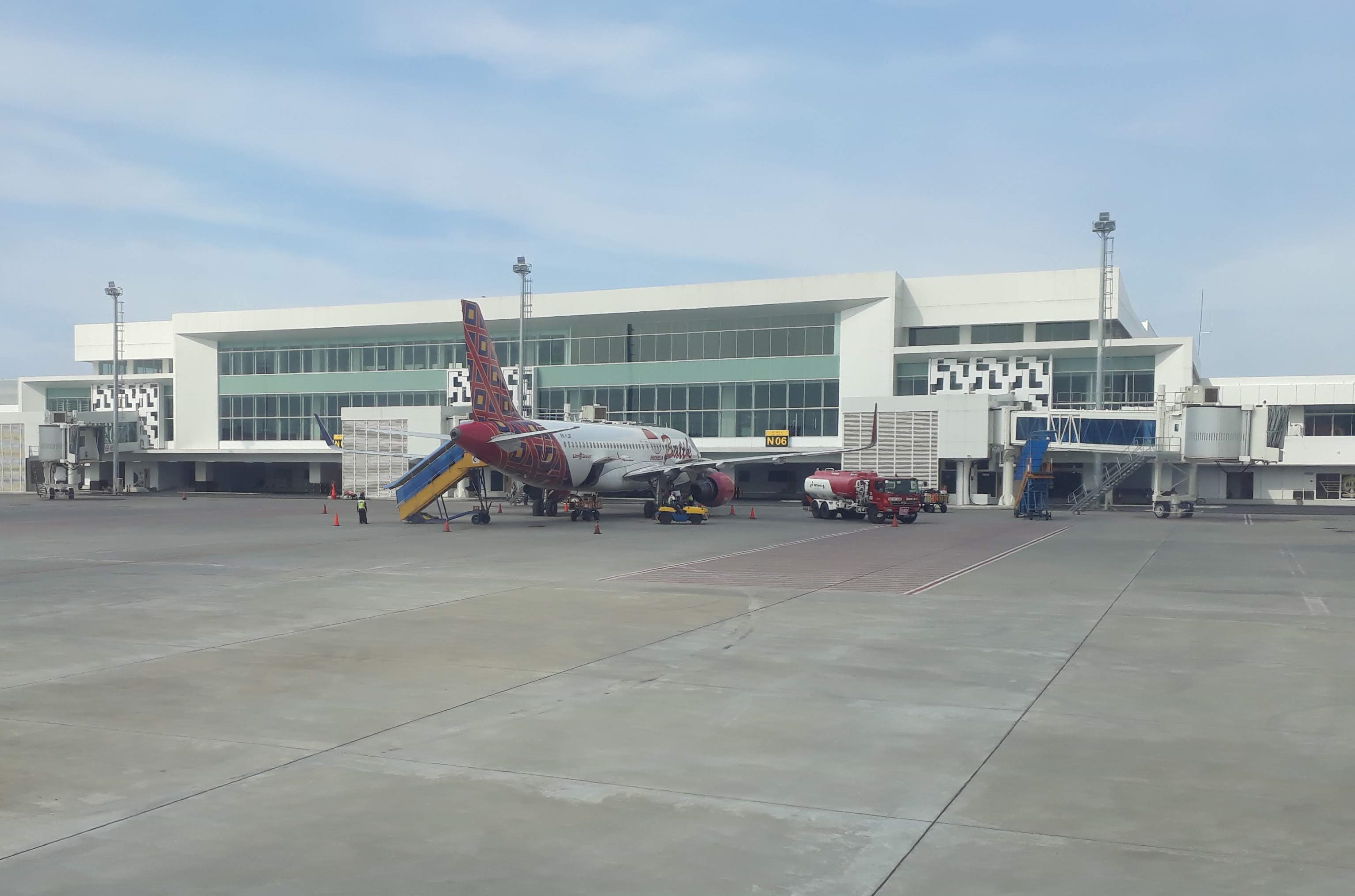
- IATA: SRG; ICAO: WAHS; WMO: 96839

Summary
- Airport type: Public / Military
- Owner: Government of Indonesia
- Operator: InJourney Airports
- Serves: Semarang
- Location: Semarang, Central Java, Indonesia
- Operating base for: Lion Air; Super Air Jet
- Time zone: WIB (UTC+07:00)
- Elevation AMSL: 10 ft (3.0 m)
- Coordinates: 06°58′17″S 110°22′27″E
- Website: www.ahmadyani-airport.id

Maps
- Java region in Indonesia

- Location in the city of Semarang Location in Java Location in Indonesia

Runways
Direction	Length		Surface
Direction	ft	m	Surface
13/31	8,399	2,560	Asphalt

Statistics (2024)
- Passengers: 2,279,475 (▲8.4%)
- Cargo (tonnes): 18,811 (▲33.3%)
- Aircraft movements: 18,146 (▼0.5%)
- Source: DGCA

Jenderal Ahmad Yani International Airport (IATA: SRG, ICAO: WAHS), formerly Kalibanteng Airport. is an international airport serving the city of Semarang, the capital of Central Java, Indonesia. The airport is named after Ahmad Yani, a former Indonesian Army general who was killed during the 30 September Movement in 1965 and was posthumously recognized as a National Hero of Indonesia. Located approximately 6 km (3.7 miles) from Semarang’s city center, the airport serves as the main gateway to the city and its surrounding regions. It operates domestic flights to major destinations such as Jakarta, Surabaya, Denpasar, and Balikpapan, as well as international services to Kuala Lumpur, Malaysia, and Singapore. The airport’s international status was temporarily revoked in 2024 due to the absence of international flights following the COVID-19 pandemic, but it was reinstated the following year.

In addition to serving as a commercial airport, the airport also shares its facilities with Ahmad Yani Army Air Base, a major facility of the Indonesian Army Aviation Center (Penerbad). The airbase is home to two combat squadrons: the 11th Squadron, which operates the AH-64E Guardian and Bell 412 series, and the 31st Squadron, which operates the Mil Mi-35 Hind E and Mil Mi-17. The base also hosts the Army Aviation Education Center (Pusdikpenerbad) and the Army Aviation Central Workshop (Bengpuspenerbad).

== History ==
=== Colonial era ===
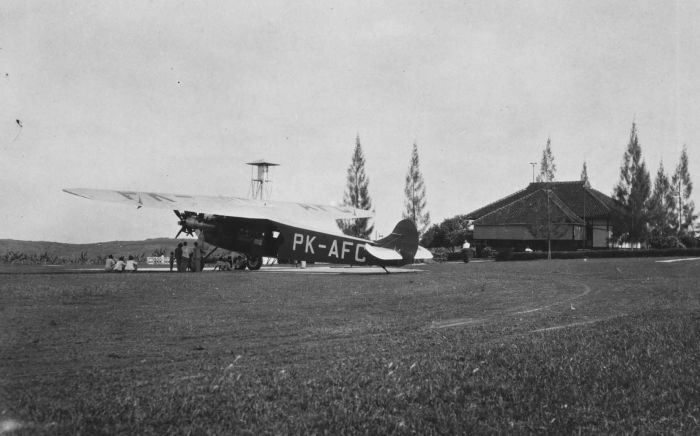
A Fokker F.VII at Simongan Airfield, the predecessor of the current airport, c. 1920

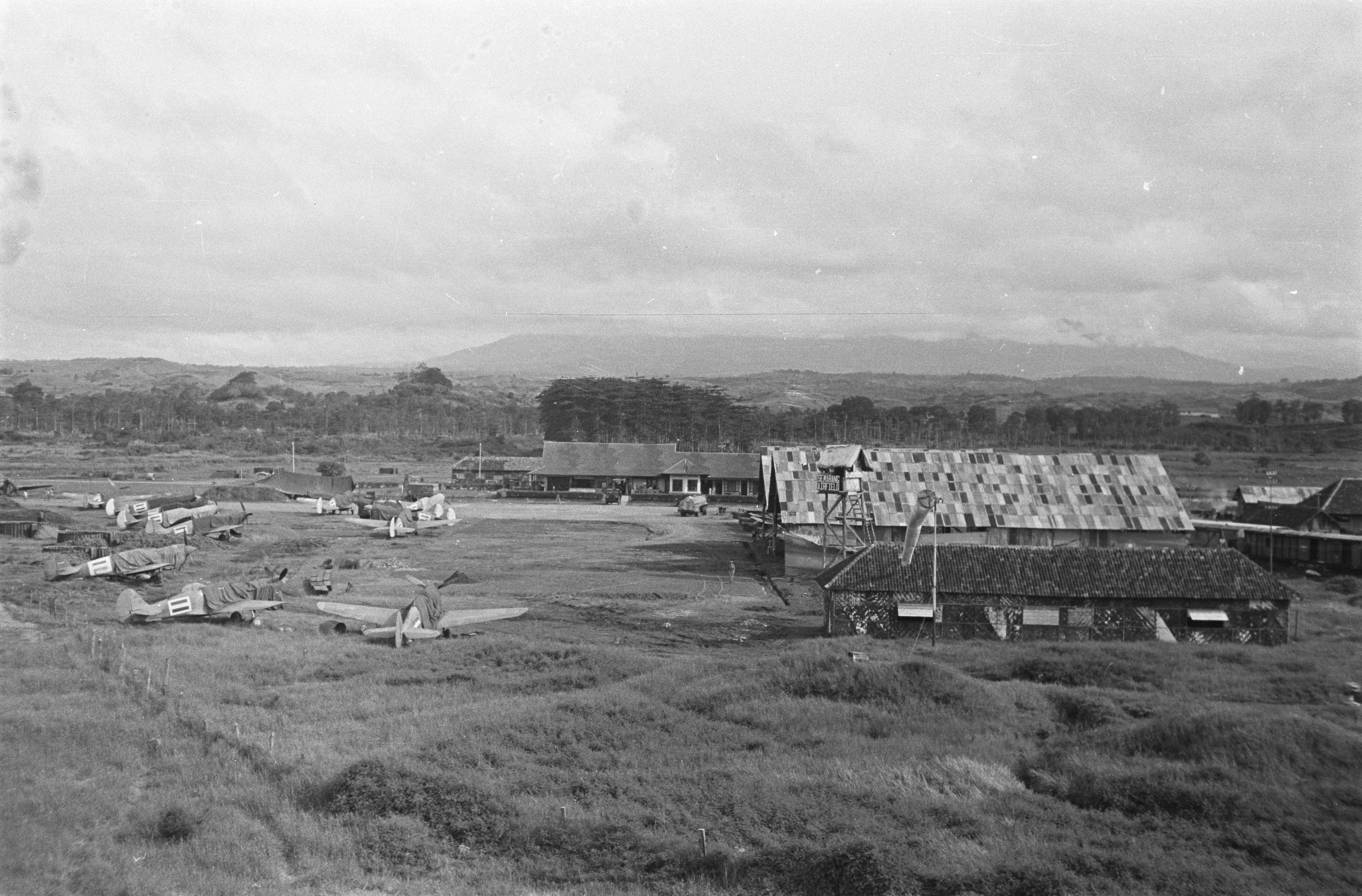
Dutch military aircraft at Kalibanteng Airfield, 1947

Prior to the development of the current airport, Semarang was already served by a commercial airfield in Simongan. Simongan Airfield was among the earliest airfields in the Dutch East Indies to handle commercial flights and was equipped with two runways. In November 1928, the Dutch East Indies flag carrier, Koninklijke Nederlandsch-Indische Luchtvaart Maatschappij (KNILM), inaugurated flights from the airfield to Tjililitan Airfield (now Halim Perdanakusuma International Airport) in Batavia. At that time, the airfield was capable of accommodating aircraft such as the Fokker F.VII. For reasons that remain unclear, the airfield was eventually closed in 1935, prompting the colonial government to construct a new facility as its replacement. Today, the former site of Simongan Airfield is occupied by the Semarang Islamic Center, while the former runway area has been converted into residential housing. Only a few remnants of the airfield survive, including the former administration building and a water tank.

Ahmad Yani International Airport traces its origins to an airfield opened by the Dutch East Indies government in March 1938, then known as Kalibanteng Airfield. At the time, the airfield was capable of accommodating aircraft such as the Douglas DC-2 and Douglas DC-3. KNILM soon began operations at the new airfield, launching daily flights connecting Semarang with Surabaya and Batavia.

When the Japanese invaded the Dutch East Indies in 1942 during the Pacific War, Kalibanteng Airfield was defended by British forces. Japanese troops landed at Eretan Wetan in Indramayu on 28 February 1942 and advanced toward Semarang with the objective of seizing the airfield. By the following day, they had reached the city and captured the airfield, overwhelming most of the British defenders, including anti-aircraft units and armed ground personnel. During the Japanese occupation of the Dutch East Indies, Kalibanteng Airfield was used as a Japanese military base to support operations against Allied forces. The airfield was also upgraded, including the extension of its runway, using captured Allied prisoners of war—primarily Dutch and British—who were subjected to harsh and inhumane treatment by their captors.

Following the Surrender of Japan, the airfield was handed over on 20 October 1945 to the Gurkhas of the 37th Brigade of the British Army. The airfield was attacked by Indonesian guerrillas during the Battle of Ambarawa in the opening phase of the Indonesian National Revolution, in an effort to prevent British forces from launching attacks against Indonesian positions in Ambarawa. The assault succeeded in rendering the airfield temporarily inoperative. However, this did not significantly disrupt Royal Air Force (RAF) close air support operations. One aircraft was hit by ground fire and subsequently crash-landed in the nearby Lake Rawa Pening. On 17 May 1946, the British withdrew and control was transferred to the Royal Netherlands East Indies Army (KNIL) in a ceremony. For the remainder of the war, the airfield served as a major Dutch base and was frequently targeted by Indonesian guerrillas. On 5 August 1946, a significant Indonesian attack damaged one Dutch Douglas DC-3 Dakota and destroyed two others. The guerrillas subsequently launched a major offensive to capture the airfield, managing to besiege it. They bombarded the facility with cannon and mortar fire, causing extensive damage; hangars and officers’ quarters were destroyed, and another Dakota transport aircraft was damaged. However, the attackers were eventually repelled by Dutch forces deploying tanks and aircraft in a counteroffensive.

The Royal Netherlands East Indies Army Air Force (ML-KNIL) maintained a presence at the airfield throughout the war, using it as a launching base for operations against Indonesian forces. During preparations for Operation Kraai, ML-KNIL aircraft were assembled at the airfield, consisting of 20 C-47s, a Lockheed L-12, 10 Spitfires, three B-25s, two SB-25s, and four Austers, which were to be used in the attack on the Indonesian stronghold at Yogyakarta.

=== Independence era ===
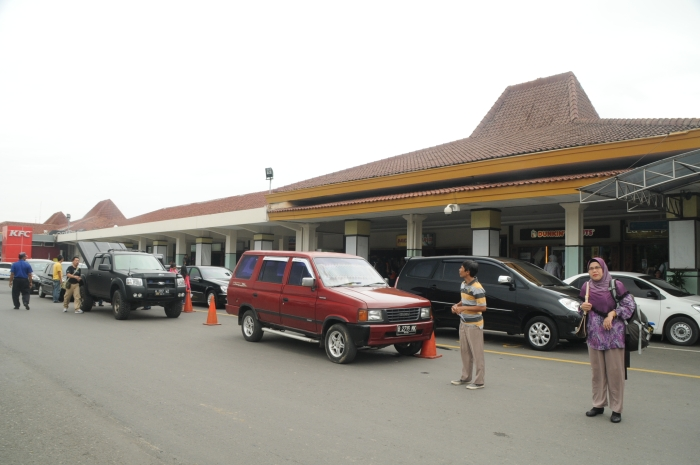
Former terminal of Jenderal Ahmad Yani International Airport, 2012

Following Dutch recognition of Indonesia’s sovereignty, the airfield was handed over to the Indonesian Army, and Dutch forces withdrew. In 1957, a major upgrade project was launched to improve the runway and other airfield facilities. The works were completed in approximately four and a half months at a cost of around 1,150,000 rupiahs. Throughout the 1950s and early 1960s, the airfield remained a military airbase of the Indonesian Army Aviation Center (Penerbad) and was closed to commercial flights. It was only opened for commercial operations following a joint decree issued by the Air Force Chief of Staff, the Minister of Transport, and the Army Chief of Staff on 31 August 1966. In the same year, the airport was renamed to its current name by order of General Suharto, in honor of Ahmad Yani, the Chief of Staff of the Indonesian Army who was killed by alleged communist sympathizers during the 30 September Movement in 1965.

On 1 October 1995, management of the airport was transferred to Angkasa Pura I, later rebranded as InJourney Airports.

Expansion began in 2004 and was implemented in phases, starting with the extension of the runway to enable the safer operation of larger aircraft. The airport was granted international status in August 2004, marked by the inaugural Semarang–Singapore flight operated by Garuda Indonesia. However, following the global recession, Garuda Indonesia later discontinued the Semarang–Singapore route. Batavia Air resumed the service in November 2009, but ceased operations on 31 January 2013 after filing for bankruptcy on 30 January 2013. Currently, the Semarang–Singapore route is operated exclusively by Scoot.

For the third consecutive year, Ahmad Yani Airport won the Cleanest Airport Award among 9 Class B Airports in Indonesia in 2013.

A new terminal was inaugurated by then-President Joko Widodo on 7 June 2018. Following the opening of the new terminal, the old terminal is planned to be transferred to the Indonesian Army.

On 2 April 2024, the Ministry of Transportation revoked the airport’s international status due to the absence of international flights. The status was later reinstated on 26 April 2025. Shortly thereafter, international services resumed, with AirAsia operating flights to Kuala Lumpur and Scoot operating flights to Singapore.

== Facilities and development ==
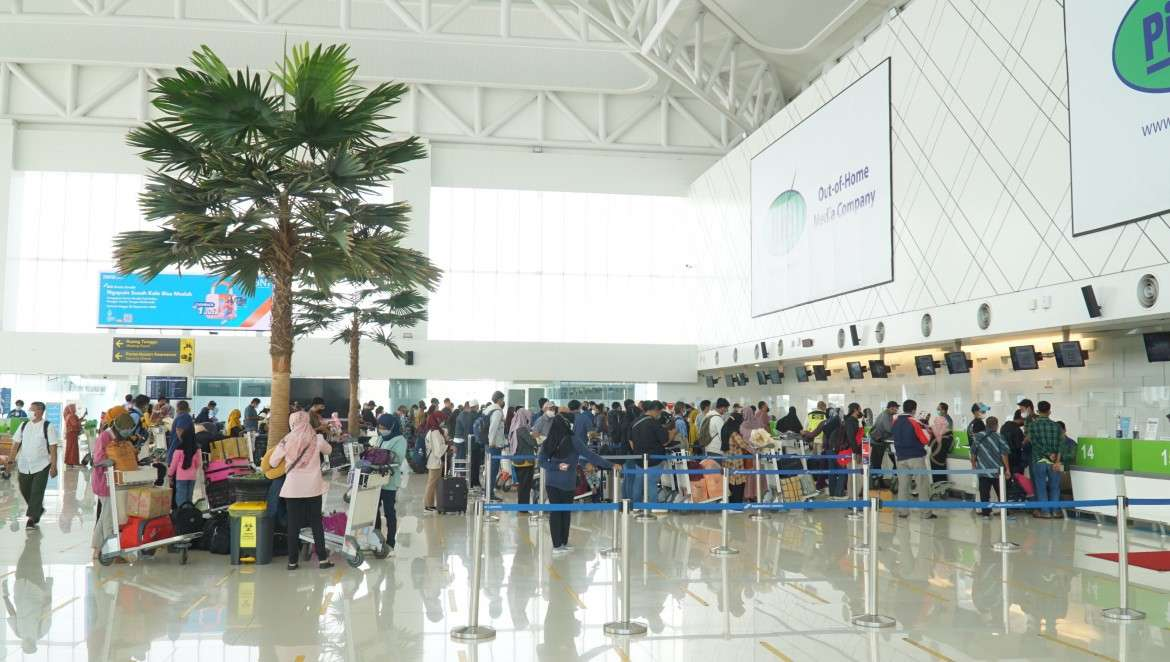
Check-in hall

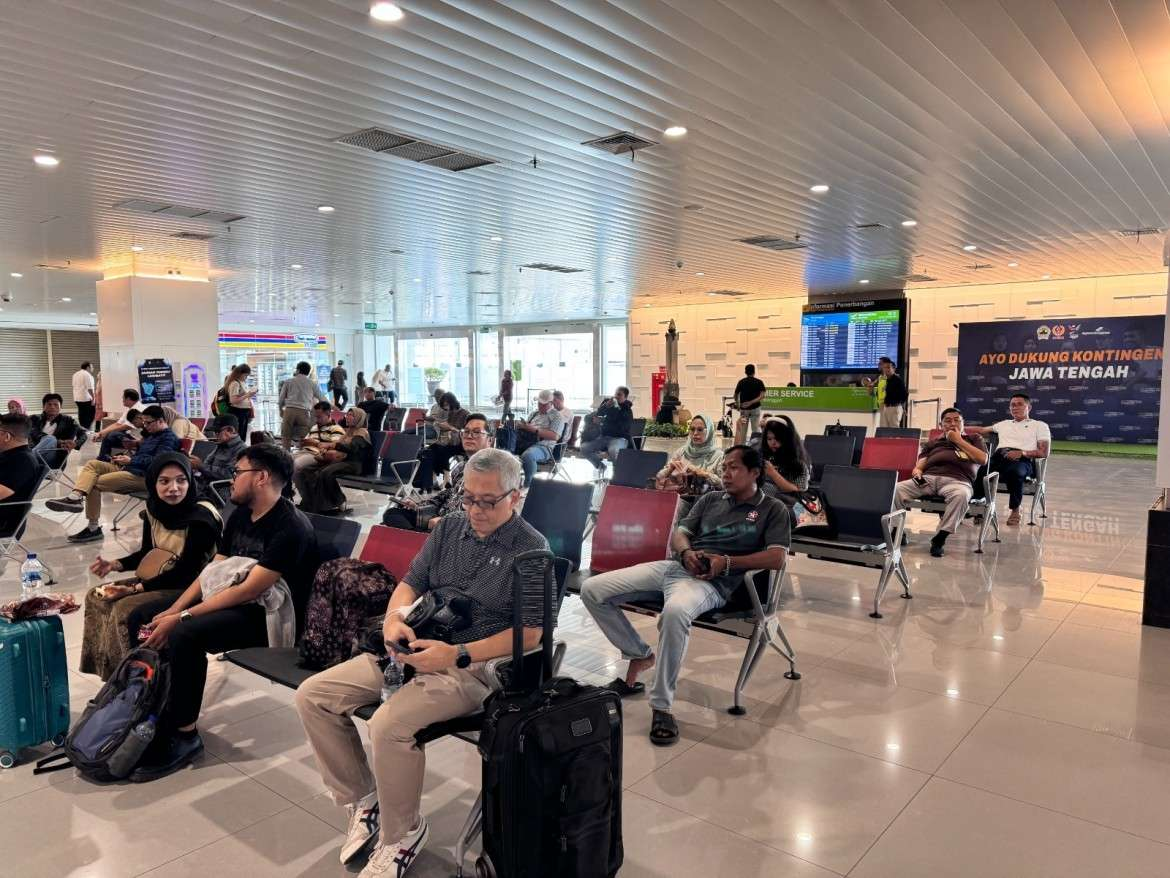
Boarding gate

On 17 June 2014, groundbreaking was held for the construction of a new airport terminal to replace the old facility, which had reached its capacity limit. The old terminal had a capacity of only 800,000 passengers per year, while in 2017 the airport already handled around 4.4 million passengers annually. Therefore, the construction of a new terminal was decided to accommodate the increasing passenger demand. A total investment of Rp 2.2 trillion was allocated for the development of the new terminal and its supporting infrastructure.

After extensive delays caused by land clearance issues and environmental concerns, the new terminal was officially opened to the public on 6 June 2018. Covering an area of 58,652 m², it is nearly ten times larger than the old terminal, which had a total area of only 6,708 m². The three-storey new terminal is equipped with three jet bridges and has a capacity of up to 7 million passengers annually, significantly higher than the old terminal’s capacity of 800,000 passengers per year. It also features 30 check-in counters. The terminal was designed with an eco-friendly concept and was developed to meet green building certification standards. Built on a swamp area, the structure is often described as Indonesia’s first floating airport terminal. Its construction incorporates environmentally conscious materials and takes advantage of the surrounding wetland environment. The design extensively uses glass to maximize natural lighting inside the terminal, thereby reducing electricity consumption.

On the airside, the apron area of the new terminal covers 72,522 m², allowing it to accommodate up to 12 narrow-body aircraft, or a mixed configuration of 10 narrow-body aircraft and 2 wide-body aircraft. In the future, the current 2,560 m runway is planned to be extended to 3,000 m to accommodate wide-body aircraft, as well as to enable the airport to handle more international flights.

In the early 2010s, proposals to relocate the airport were raised by members of the Semarang City Regional House of Representatives. The main reason was its proximity to the city center, which restricts investors from constructing high-rise buildings exceeding 45 meters in height, as such structures could interfere with air traffic. It was therefore proposed that the airport be relocated to the Demak or Kendal areas. However, the proposal was rejected by Angkasa Pura I, the airport’s operator, which maintained that the airport remained safe and suitable for continued operations. The Governor of Central Java, Bibit Waluyo, also opposed the plan, stating that building a new airport would require significant land acquisition and substantial funding.

== Airlines and destinations ==
=== Passenger ===
Airlines	Destinations
AirAsia	Kuala Lumpur–International
Batik Air	Jakarta−Soekarno-Hatta, Pangkalan Bun
Citilink	Banjarmasin, Jakarta−Soekarno-Hatta
Garuda Indonesia	Jakarta–Soekarno-Hatta
Lion Air	Balikpapan, Banjarmasin, Makassar
NAM Air	Pangkalan Bun, Sampit
Scoot	Singapore
Super Air Jet	Balikpapan, Batam, Denpasar, Jakarta–Soekarno-Hatta, Palangkaraya, Pontianak
Susi Air	Karimunjawa
Wings Air	Surabaya

== Statistics ==
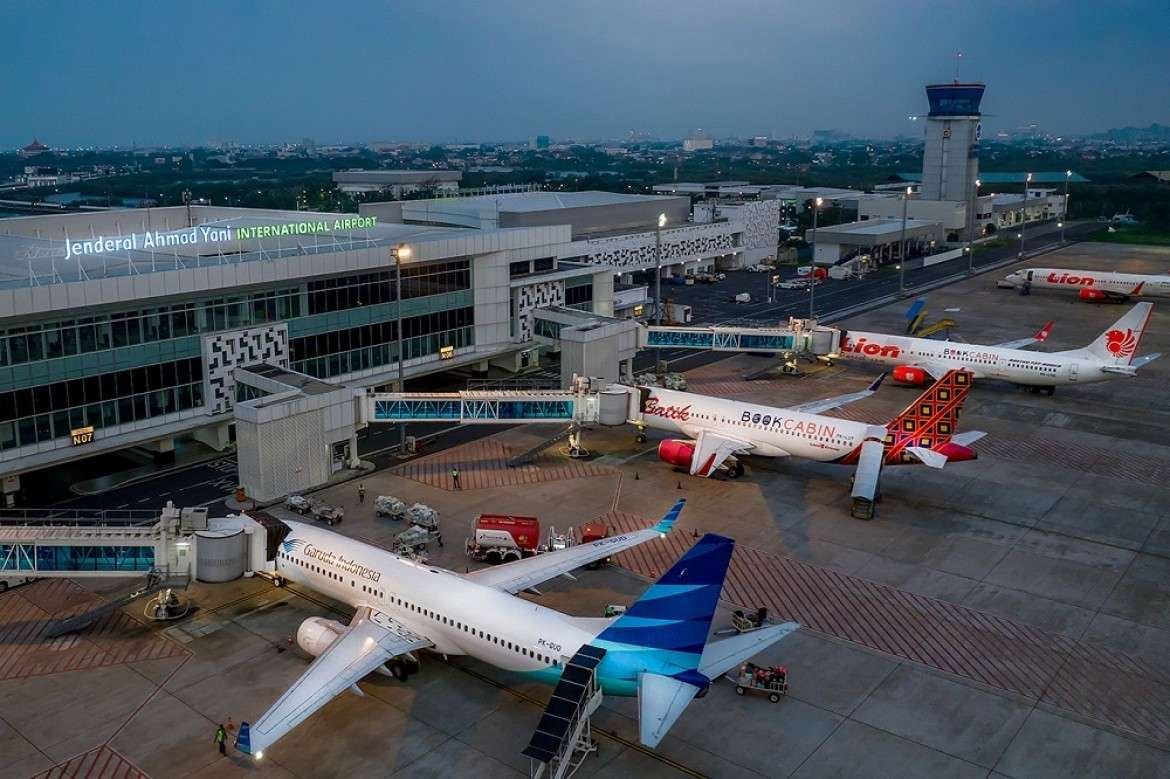
Aircraft lining up at Jenderal Ahmad Yani International Airport

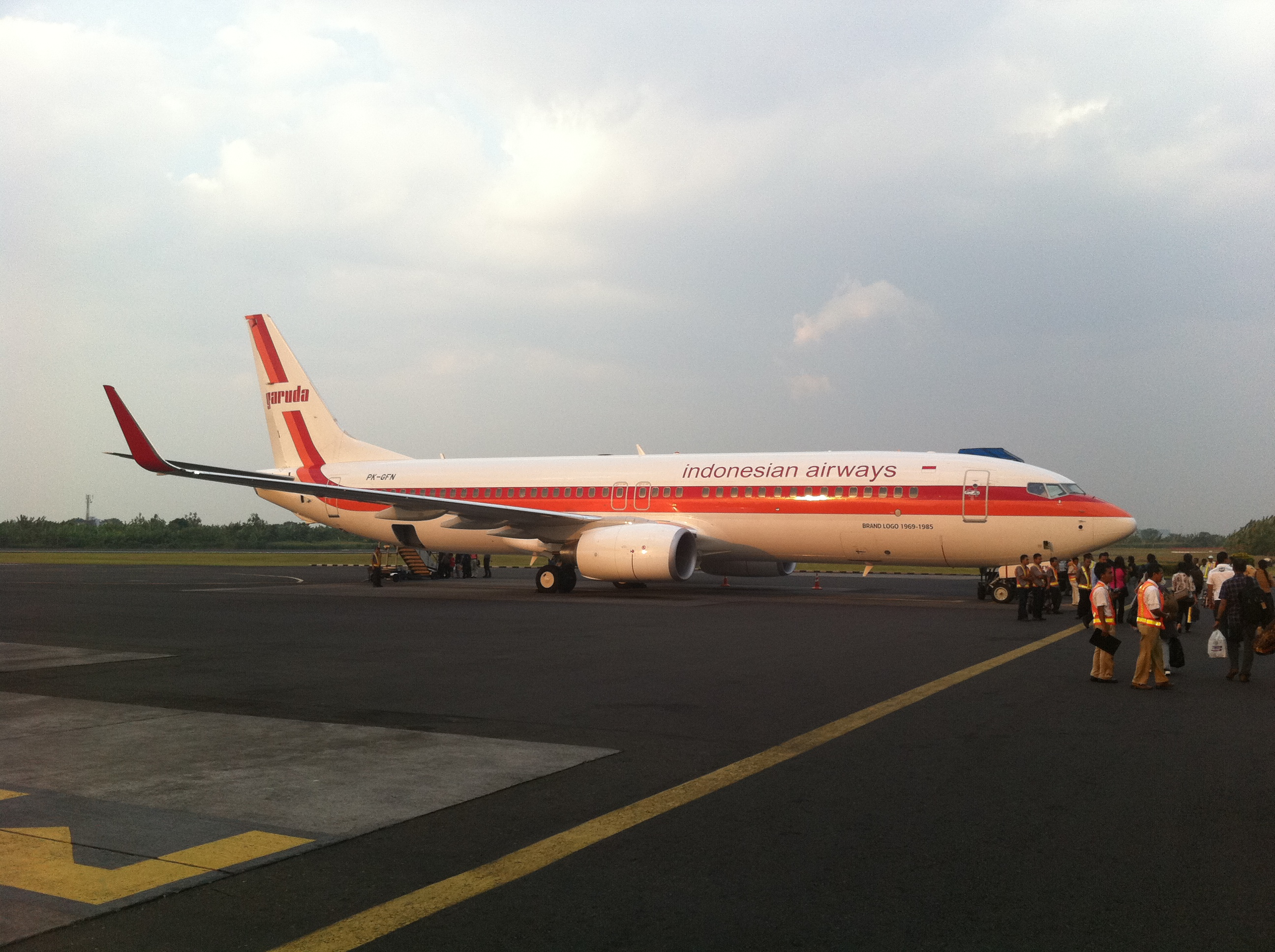
A Garuda Indonesia Boeing 737-800 at Jenderal Ahmad Yani International Airport, 2012

Annual passenger numbers and aircraft statistics
Year	Passengers handled	Passenger % change	Cargo (tonnes)	Cargo % change	Aircraft movements	Aircraft % change
2006	1,423,814	Steady	8,683	Steady	16,986	Steady
2007	1,465,956	▲3.0	8,651	▼0.4	21,683	▲27.7
2008	1,418,099	▼3.3	8,418	▼2.7	22,044	▲1.7
2009	1,656,668	▲16.8	8,103	▼3.7	20,577	▼6.7
2010	2,018,818	▲21.9	9,711	▲19.8	22,287	▲8.3
2011	2,426,844	▲20.2	9,373	▼3.5	25,802	▲15.8
2012	3,007,700	▲23.9	10,145	▲8.2	32,919	▲27.6
2013	3,295,022	▲9.6	10,763	▲6.1	33,898	▲3.0
2014	3,469,395	▲5.3	13,727	▲27.5	52,393	▲54.6
2015	3,682,108	▲6.1	14,353	▲4.6	36,457	▼30.4
2016	4,219,815	▲14.6	15,437	▲7.6	38,190	▲4.8
2017	4,429,076	▲5.0	17,631	▲14.2	38,615	▲1.1
2018	5,162,142	▲16.6	23,556	▲33.6	45,934	▲19.0
2019	3,906,804	▼24.3	17,875	▼24.1	36,893	▼19.7
2020	1,384,879	▼64.6	9,392	▼47.5	17,104	▼53.6
2021	883,871	▼36.2	7,975	▼15.1	10,228	▼40.2
2022	1,631,485	▲84.6	9,801	▲22.9	14,771	▲44.4
2023	2,103,076	▲28.9	14,114	▲44.0	18,243	▲23.5
2024	2,279,475	▲8.4	18,811	▲33.3	18,146	▼0.5
^{Source: DGCA, BPS}

== Ground transportation ==
=== Bus ===
From 2005 until 2007 there was a shuttle bus service connecting the airport to the city center and Semarang Old Town. However, due to protests from local airport taxi operators, this service was terminated.

In 2013, Trans Semarang, a bus rapid transit (BRT) operator, started to serve Ahmad Yani Airport. Only one route went through the airport but all the available routes are interconnected. The expected interval is 15 to 30 minutes between buses unless there is a traffic jam.

=== Car and taxi ===
There are airport taxis provided and the reception available right in the arrival terminal. Some public taxis in Semarang cannot take passengers in the airport terminal.

== Accidents and incidents ==
- On 1 May 1981, Vickers Viscount 832 PK-RVN of Mandala Airlines carrying 44 passengers and crew was damaged beyond economic repair when it departed the runway on landing, causing the starboard and nose gear to collapse.
- On 18 October 1992, Merpati Nusantara Airlines Flight 5601 operating a CASA/IPTN CN-235-10 PK-MNN crashed on a domestic flight from Semarang to Bandung. The aircraft impacted Mount Puntang near Mount Papandayan and burst into flames, killing all 27 passengers and four crew aboard. This is the worst disaster involving a CASA/IPTN CN-235.
- On 30 November 1994, A Fokker 28 Mk 4000 PK-GKU of Merpati Nusantara Airlines operating on flight 422 from Jakarta touched down during heavy rain far along the runway. Then it overran the runway and fell into a ditch, causing it to break into three pieces. All 85 passengers and crew survived.
- On 25 December 2016, Wings Air flight IW1896 from Bandung, using an ATR 72-600 (registration PK-WGW) suffered a landing accident. At the time of the approach, it was raining at the airport with Cumulonimbus clouds in the area at 1500 feet. Following a VOR/DME approach, the aircraft landed on runway 13 and bounced; the right main gear then folded inwards causing the aircraft to veer right. The aircraft stopped on the right runway edge near taxiway D tilting to the right. All 68 passengers and four crew survived.
