= CJN =

CJN or cjn may refer to:

- Canadian Jewish News
- Chief Justice of Nigeria, who presides over the Supreme Court of Nigeria
- IATA code for Cijulang Nusawiru Airport
- Cam Newton, American National Football League quarterback.
