= Susi Air =

Airline of Indonesia

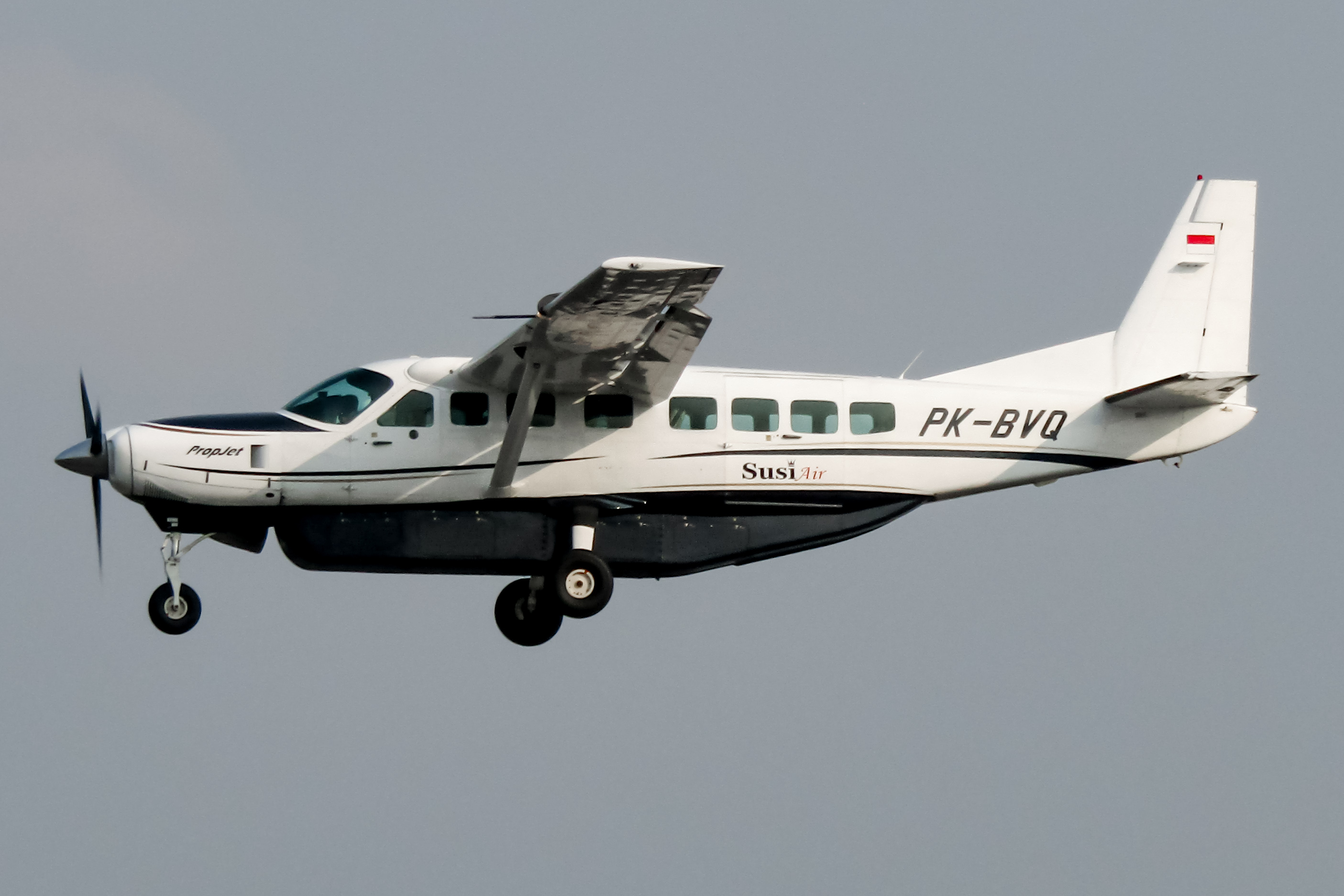
- Cessna 208 operated by Susi Air
IATA	ICAO	Call sign
SI	SQS	SKYQUEEN
- Founded: 2004; 22 years ago
- Operating bases: Banda Aceh; Biak; Dabo; Jakarta–Halim Perdanakusuma; Jayapura; Kupang; Makassar; Malinau; Manokwari; Medan; Merauke; Nabire; Pangandaran; Pekanbaru; Samarinda; Tarakan; Ternate; Timika; Wamena
- Fleet size: 49 (July 2025)
- Destinations: 168 (approved)
- Parent company: PT ASI Pudjiastuti Aviation
- Headquarters: Pangandaran, West Java, Indonesia
- Key people: Syahril Japarin (CEO)
- Website: www.susiair.com

PT ASI Pudjiastuti Aviation, operating as Susi Air, is an Indonesian scheduled and charter airline based in Pangandaran, West Java. Sixty percent of the airline's operation serves commercial regular routes and pioneer routes while the rest is charter flights. The company currently operates from several main bases across the Indonesian archipelago. Susi Air is listed in category 2 by Indonesian Civil Aviation Authority for airline safety quality.

Although previously listed on the list of air carriers banned in the European Union, this ban was lifted on 14 June 2018.

== History ==
Susi Air was established in late 2004 by Christian von Strombeck, who worked as Director of Operations, and his wife Susi Pudjiastuti, it was originally set up to transport the fisheries cargo of sister company PT ASI Pudjiastuti, because land transportation to Jakarta took around 12 hours, too long to maintain the freshness of the company's marine produce as they make their way into restaurants and merchants.

The 2004 Indian Ocean earthquake triggered devastating tsunamis along the Western coast of Sumatra. The two new Cessna Grand Caravans that had just been ordered by Susi Air were very quickly pressed into service transporting equipment and medicine for aid agencies. A Susi Air aircraft was the first plane to land in Aceh after the tsunami. During 2005 Susi's planes were chartered by NGOs in Aceh, rapidly grossing sufficient money for Susi Air to buy a new plane in 2006. This third Grand Caravan enabled the company to begin scheduled services out of Medan, capital of North Sumatra. In late 2006, this aircraft was moved to Jayapura, Papua, to establish a base in what is one of the more challenging flying environments in the world.

A fourth Grand Caravan was added to the fleet in early 2007 along with the addition of a new type, the Diamond Twin Star, for use on charter flights as well as opening up the possibility for Susi Air to train their own pilots. By the end of 2007 four additional Grand Caravans had been added to the fleet, along with the addition of two Pilatus Turbo Porters.

In 2008 a Diamond Star was added to the fleet for use by the Susi Flying School based at the company headquarters in Pangandaran, West Java, thus furthering the company's commitment to train local pilots. The ninth Grand Caravan arrived in May continuing the steady growth of the company. September 2008 saw the arrival of the tenth Grand Caravan. In October, the Diamond Star aircraft suffered an engine failure and successfully made a forced landing near Bandung. The first Garmin G1000 cockpit Grand Caravan arrived in April 2009, with another following shortly after. July 2009 saw the arrival of the first Piaggio Avanti.

Susi Air is known within Indonesia for hiring its pilots from overseas, mainly from Western countries, due to a lack of Indonesian born and trained pilots. The country has strict rules regarding the number of foreign professionals any one company can employ. In a news article in 2011 Susi Pujiastuti stated that out of her 179 pilots, 175 were from overseas. Susi Air and its pilots were also documented in a documentary series called "Worst Place to be a Pilot", regarding the dangerous routes and runways that pilots experience.

== Destinations ==
Susi Air operates charter and scheduled flights from its bases all around Indonesia from Medan (North Sumatra), East Jakarta (Jakarta), Samarinda (East Kalimantan) to Jayapura and Merauke (Papua).

Susi Air operates the following services (at December 2020):

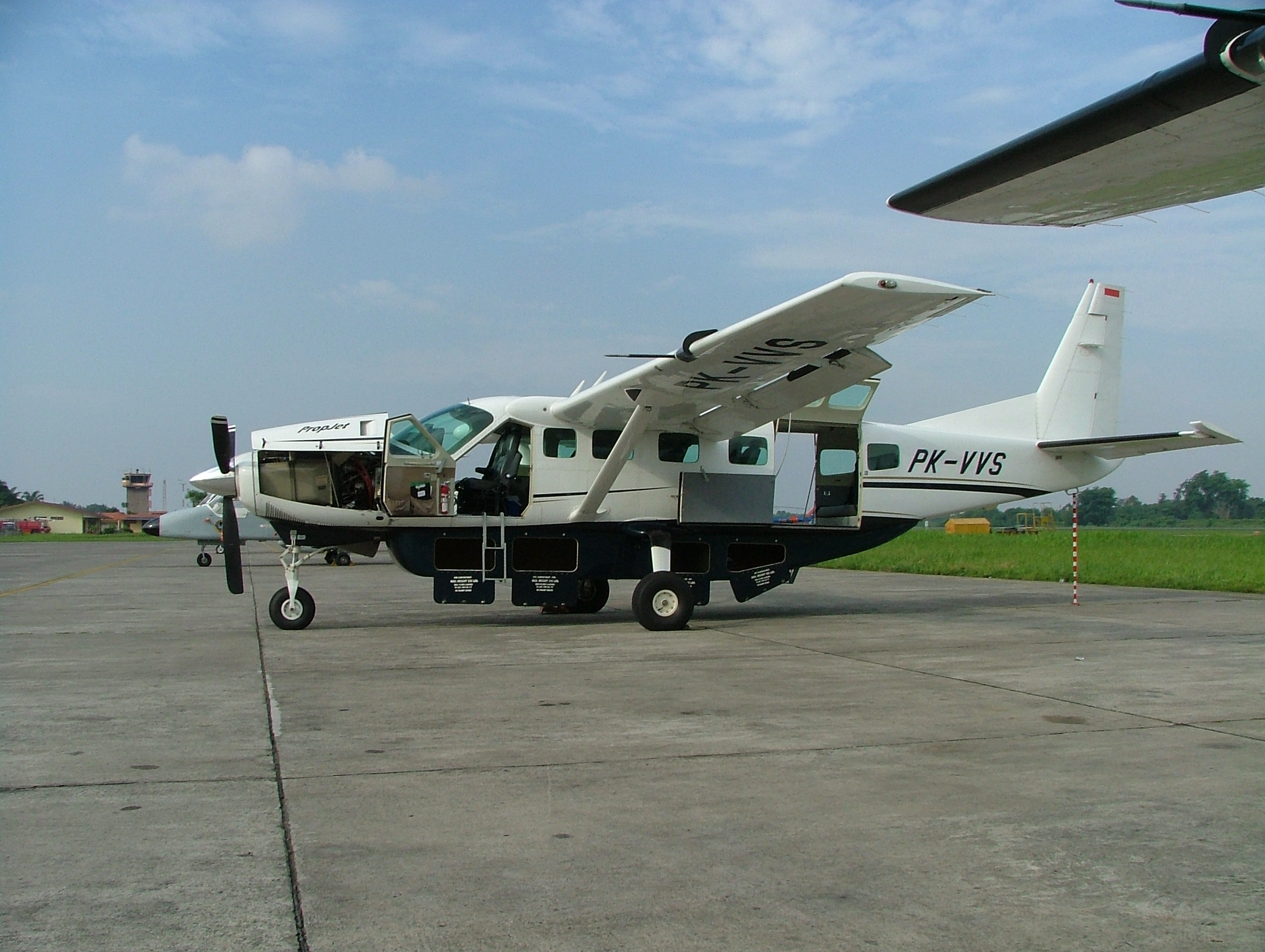
Cessna 208

Indonesia

- Java
  - Bandung - Husein Sastranegara Airport
  - Bawean - Harun Thohir Airport
  - Cilacap - Tunggul Wulung Airport
  - Jakarta - Halim Perdanakusuma International Airport
  - Jember - Notohadinegoro Airport
  - Karimunjawa - Dewadaru Airport
  - Pangandaran - Cijulang Nusawiru Airport
  - Semarang - Jenderal Ahmad Yani International Airport
  - Pangandaran - Susi Int'l Pangandaran Beach Airstrip
  - Sumenep - Trunojoyo Airport
  - Surabaya - Juanda International Airport
  - Yogyakarta - Adisucipto Airport
- Kalimantan
  - Banjarmasin - Syamsudin Noor International Airport
  - Batulicin - Bersujud Airport
  - Datah Dawai - Datah Dawai Airport
  - Kotabaru - Gusti Syamsir Alam Airport
  - Long Apung - Long Apung Airport
  - Long Bawan - Juvai Semaring Airport
  - Malinau - Robert Atty Bessing Airport
  - Melak - West Kutai Melalan Airport
  - Muara Teweh - Beringin Airport
  - Nunukan - Nunukan Airport
  - Samarinda - Aji Pangeran Tumenggung Pranoto International Airport (Base)
  - Tanjung Selor - Tanjung Harapan Airport
  - Tarakan - Juwata Airport
- Sulawesi
  - Masamba - Andi Jemma Airport
  - Rampi - Rampi Airport
- Lesser Sunda Islands
  - Kupang - El Tari Airport
  - Larantuka - Gewayantana Airport
  - Lewoleba - A. A. Bere Tallo Airport
  - Rote Island - David Constantijn Saudale Airport
  - Sabu Island - Tardamu Airport
- Maluku
  - Ambon - Pattimura Airport
  - Banda - Bandanaira Airport
- Papua
  - Biak - Frans Kaisiepo Airport
  - Bintuni - Stenkol Airport
  - Fak Fak - Torea Airport
  - Manokwari - Rendani Airport
  - Merdey - Merdey Airport
  - Nabire - Douw Aturure Airport
  - Noemfoor - Kornasoren Airport
  - Sorong - Domine Eduard Osok Airport
  - Serui - Sudjarwo Tjondronegoro Airport
  - Sinak - Sinak Airport
  - Wasior - Wasior Airport
  - Wamena - Wamena Airport
  - Jayapura - Sentani International Airport
  - Merauke - Mopah Airport
- Sumatra
  - Bengkulu - Fatmawati Soekarno Airport
  - Blangkejeren - Senubung Airport
  - Blangpidie - Blangpidie Airport
  - Banda Aceh - Sultan Iskandar Muda International Airport (Base)
  - Enggano - Enggano Airport
  - Dabo - Dabo Airport
  - Jambi - Sultan Thaha Airport
  - Kutacane - Alas Leuser Airport
  - Letung - Letung Airport
  - Medan - Kualanamu International Airport
  - Meulaboh - Cut Nyak Dhien Airport
  - Mukomuko - Mukomuko Airport
  - Padang - Minangkabau International Airport
  - Pangkal Pinang - Depati Amir Airport
  - Pekanbaru - Sultan Syarif Kasim II International Airport
  - Sibolga - Ferdinand Lumban Tobing Airport
  - Siborong-Borong - Raja Sisingamangaraja XII Airport
  - Simpang Ampek - Pusako Anak Nagari Airport
  - Simeulue Island - Lasikin Airport
  - Tanjung Balai Karimun - Raja Haji Abdullah Airport
  - Tembilahan - Tempuling Airport

== Fleet ==
Susi Air is the largest operator of Cessna Grand Caravans in the Asia Pacific region; these make up the majority of the company's fleet. The company's fleet consists of the following aircraft:

Susi Air Fleet
Aircraft	In Fleet	Orders	Passengers	Notes
Piaggio P180 Avanti II	3	0	8	
Cessna 208B Grand Caravan	32	0	12	20 on order as of Paris airshow 2009.
Pilatus PC-6 Porter	9	0	7	
LET-410 UVP-E20	1	0	19	
Air Tractor AT-802	1	0	0	Used in Papua as fuel tanker and for aerial firefighting
Piper PA-28-181 Archer II	1	0	3	
AgustaWestland Koala AW119Ke	1	0	6-7	
AgustaWestland Grand AW109S	1	0	6-7	
Total	49	0		

== Incidents and accidents ==
In October 2008, a Diamond DA-40 (registration PK-VVL) from Susi Air made an emergency landing on a firing range in the hilly Army Infantry Training Center compound, some 40 kilometers from the West Java provincial capital Bandung. The pilot was forced to make an emergency landing because of a fuel pump failure. The aircraft's propeller gear was damaged after hitting the ground on the uneven grass field. Besides the Pilot, the airplane was carrying two mechanics to fix another Susi Air airplane that had broken down at Nusawiru airport.

An investigation into this accident was conducted by the Indonesian National Transportation Safety Committee, which found that the pilot was not licensed in Indonesia, and that the accident was caused by fuel starvation due to the failure of a fuel pump. The committee said that Susi Air should ensure all pilots have sufficient licenses and that the engine manufacturer, Thielert, should review its engines in order to prevent similar incidents.

On 9 September 2011 a Cessna 208B Grand Caravan (PK-VVE) was destroyed when it crashed in the Pasema District, Indonesia. Both pilots were killed. The airplane was carrying four drums of diesel fuel and some goods from Wamena to a remote airstrip. It failed to arrive at the destination. The wreckage was found in mountainous terrain in the Yahukimo Regency. The name of the airstrip has been named as Kenyem and Kenyam in Indonesian media. This is the same airstrip which is named Keneyan in the Australian Defence Force's Tactical Airfield Guide of the region.

Also on the same day, 9 September 2011, another Cessna 208B Grand Caravan (PK-BVQ) was mistakenly reported to have slid off the runway at Kupang's El Tari airport. The aircraft suffered a flat tire during landing and was stuck on the runway. As ground personnel arrived at the aircraft, the decision was made to push the aircraft off the runway in order to reopen the runway. The pictures taken of the aircraft on the grass led to a story of a runway excursion. This incident resulted in the aircraft blocking the runway for 50 minutes causing two Boeing 737 commercial flights to divert to Makassar, South Sulawesi.

On 23 November 2011 a Cessna 208B Grand Caravan (PK-VVG) was destroyed after a go-around at Sugapa Airport in Nabire, Papua, killing the aircraft's co-pilot and leaving the pilot with severe injuries; the two crew were the only people on the aircraft, which was operating a cargo flight. The plane crash occurred after avoiding a runway jaywalker at a poorly managed runway in the Bintang Mountains. The pilot decided to go-around (i.e. fly back up), but the area was surrounded by mountains and cliffs, causing the accident. The National Transport Safety Committee released the final report on the accident on April 16, 2013.

On 25 April 2012 a PC 6 (PK VVQ) crashed in, Melak district, East Kalimantan killing the pilot and passenger who were engaged in an Aerial Survey of the area. The aircraft was reported missing at 1710 LT on 25 April with the wreckage found on 26 April, thus confirming the condition of the occupants/aircraft.

In 2014, Iranian national Nader Haghighi was hired as a pilot by Susi Air, but was fired after it was discovered he was using a fraudulent passport. At the time of his hiring, he was not licensed to operate an aircraft as previously his pilot's license had been revoked by the FAA and he had been convicted of stealing an aircraft in the United States.

As a result of this safety record, United States Embassy personnel as of May 2012 are prohibited from flying on Susi Air. Similarly, Australian Government officials are not permitted to use the airline.

=== 2023 hostage incident ===
On 8 February 2023, a New Zealand Susi Air pilot was taken hostage in the Papua province of Indonesia. Papuan separatists fighters abducted Philip Mark Mehrtens, and set alight to the Pilatus Porter aircraft that he had just landed in a regional airport in Paro, Nduga. His captors stated they would not release Mehrtens "unless Indonesia recognises and frees Papua from Indonesian colonialism". He remained hostage nearly two years and was in released September 2024.

Militants from the West Papua National Liberation Army (TPNPB) movement took responsibility for the attack in a statement and stated that they would be targeting more foreigners in attacks.
