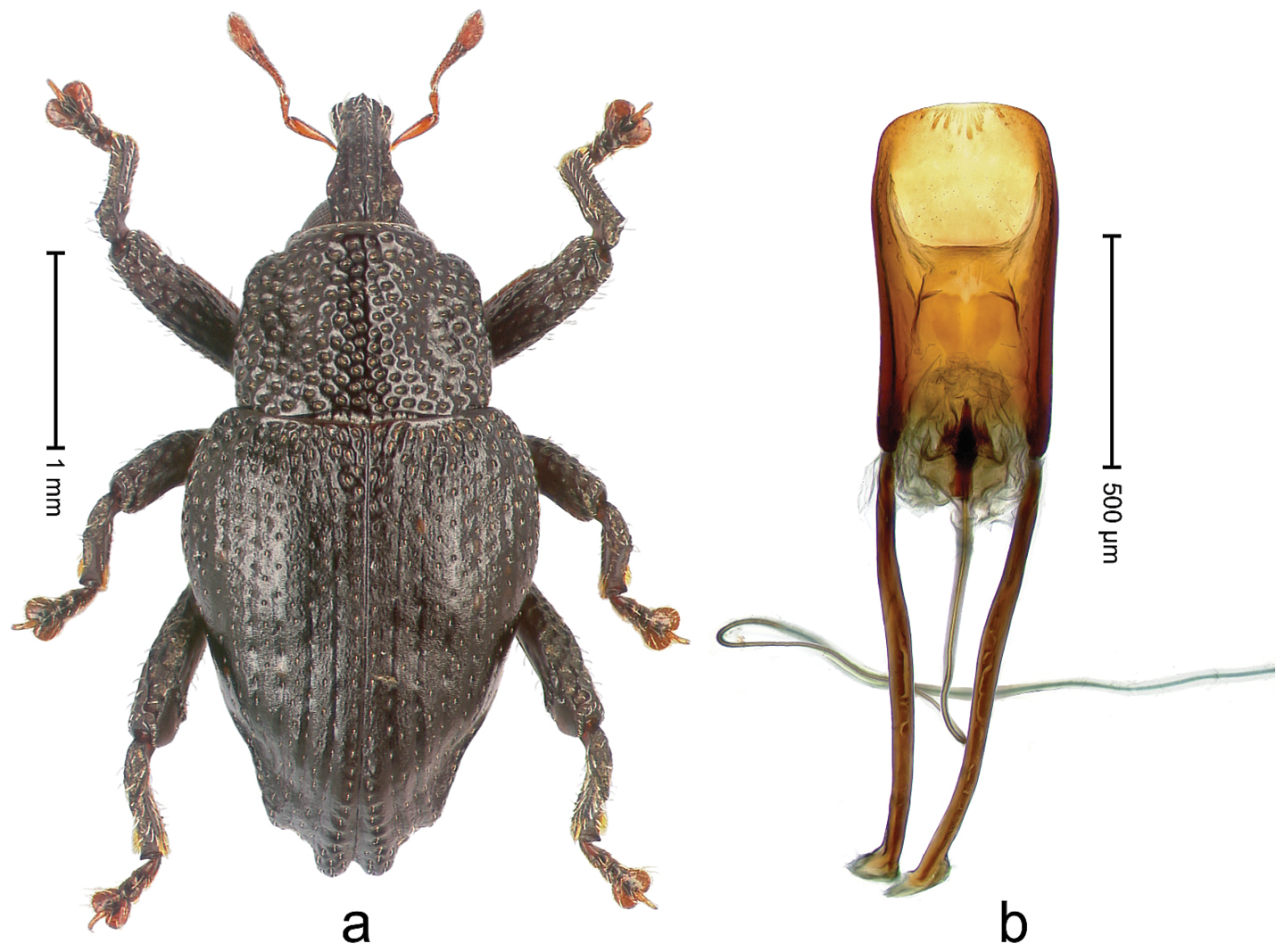

Scientific classification
- Kingdom: Animalia
- Phylum: Arthropoda
- Clade: Pancrustacea
- Class: Insecta
- Order: Coleoptera
- Suborder: Polyphaga
- Infraorder: Cucujiformia
- Family: Curculionidae
- Genus: Trigonopterus
- Species: T. binodulus

Binomial name
- Trigonopterus binodulus Riedel, 2014

= Trigonopterus binodulus =

Species of beetle

Trigonopterus binodulus is a species of flightless weevil in the genus Trigonopterus from Indonesia. The species was described in 2014 and is named after the shape of the apex of its elytra. The beetle is 2.78–4.20 mm long. It has a black body with ferruginous tarsi and antennae. Endemic to West Java, where it is known from Pangandaran and Mount Sawal at elevations of 156–990 m (510–3,250 ft).

== Taxonomy ==
Trigonopterus binodulus was described by the entomologist Alexander Riedel in 2014 on the basis of an adult male specimen collected from Mount Sawal on the island of Java in Indonesia. The specific name is derived from the Latin words bi- (meaning "two") and nodulus (meaning "small swelling"), referring to the shape of the apex of the elytra.

== Description ==
The beetle is 2.78–4.20 mm long. The tarsi and antennae are ferruginous, while the rest of the body is black. The body is elongate, with a noticeable constriction between the pronotum and elytra in dorsal view, and is evenly convex in profile. The rostrum features a median carina that ends at the forehead, flanked by a pair of submedian ridges. The furrows between these ridges each contain a row of erect, piliform scales. The epistome has a transverse, angular ridge that forms a small median tooth.

The pronotum projects subangularly at the anterolateral corners and shows a subapical constriction. Its surface is coarsely punctate, with dull, microreticulate interspaces; each puncture contains a small seta. The disc also has a pair of shallow submedian impressions. The elytral striae are indistinct, and the intervals are flat with irregular punctation; each puncture contains a small recumbent seta. The interspaces are dull, coriaceous, and microreticulate. Interval 7 is swollen near the apex and slightly projects laterally, while the sutural interval at the apex is prominently swollen, forming a pair of rounded apical protrusions. The femora have a blunt tooth formed by the anteroventral ridge. The metafemur bears a subapical stridulatory patch and a transverse row of denticles. Abdominal ventrite 5 has a broad impression and is sparsely covered with long, erect setae.

The penis has nearly parallel sides and a broadly rounded apex. The transfer apparatus is small and spine-like (spiniform), and the apodemes are 1.5 times the length of the penis body. The ductus ejaculatorius lacks a bulbus.

In males, the integument is dull and microreticulate-coriaceous, while in females, the interspaces between punctures are polished. The female rostrum has a glabrous median ridge bordered by puncture rows and a pair of sublateral furrows; the epistome is simple. In females, the elytra have a smoothly convex lateral contour in the basal half, with intervals 2–3 being subapically costate. In males, the elytral lateral contour is sinuate in the basal half, with a concavity at the level of the hind legs, and intervals 2–3 show indistinct ridges subapically.

== Distribution ==
Trigonopterus binodulus is endemic to the Indonesian province of West Java, where it is known from Pangandaran and Mount Sawal. It has been recorded at elevations of 156–990 m (510–3,250 ft).
