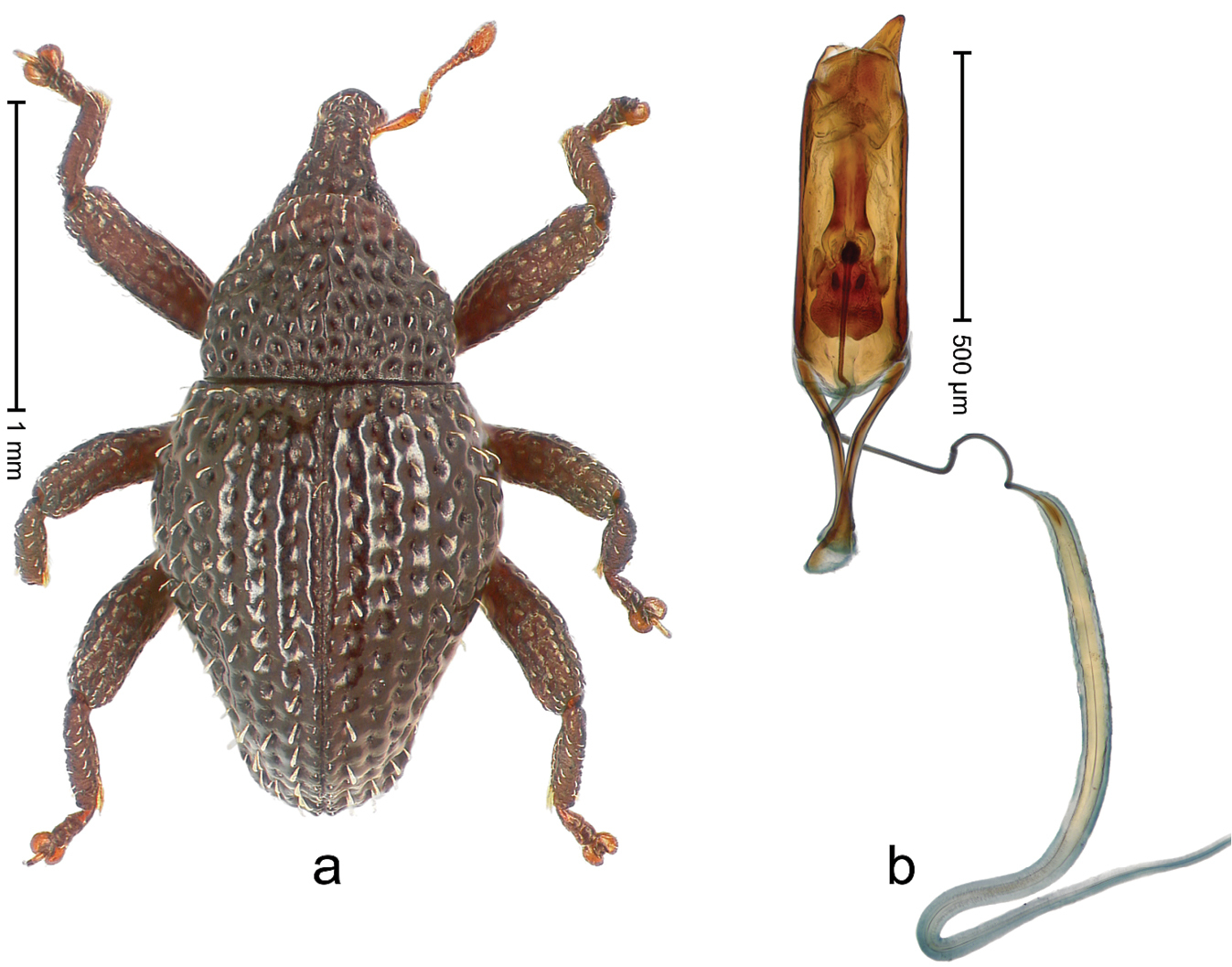

Scientific classification
- Kingdom: Animalia
- Phylum: Arthropoda
- Clade: Pancrustacea
- Class: Insecta
- Order: Coleoptera
- Suborder: Polyphaga
- Infraorder: Cucujiformia
- Family: Curculionidae
- Genus: Trigonopterus
- Species: T. foveatus

Binomial name
- Trigonopterus foveatus Riedel, 2014

= Trigonopterus foveatus =

Species of beetle

Trigonopterus foveatus is a species of flightless weevil in the genus Trigonopterus from Indonesia.

== Etymology ==
The specific name is derived from the Latin word foveatus, meaning "pitted".

== Description ==
Individuals measure 2.02–2.20 mm in length. Body is slightly oval in shape. General coloration black, with rust-colored legs and head.

== Range ==
The species is found around elevations of 74–157 metres (243–515 ft) in Leuweung Sancang and Pangandaran, in the Indonesian province of West Java.
