= Juwata Airport =

Juwata International Airport Bandar Udara Internasional Juwata
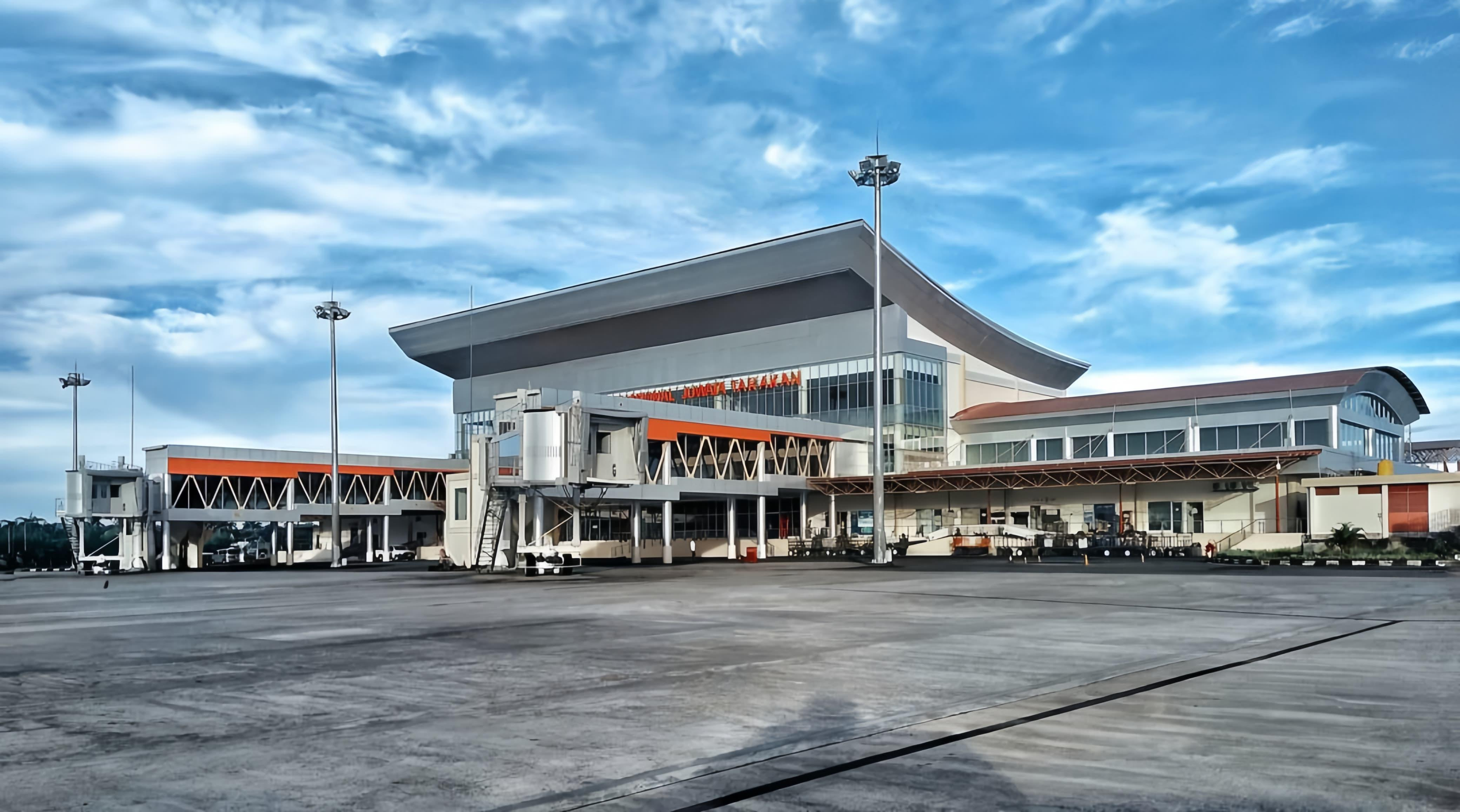
- IATA: TRK; ICAO: WAQQ; WMO: 96509

Summary
- Airport type: Public / Military
- Owner: Government of Indonesia
- Operator: Directorate General of Civil Aviation
- Serves: Tarakan
- Location: Tarakan, North Kalimantan, Indonesia
- Time zone: WITA (UTC+08:00)
- Elevation AMSL: 20 ft (6.1 m)
- Coordinates: 03°19′36″N 117°33′56″E
- Website: trk.informasibandara.org

Maps
- Kalimantan region in Indonesia

- Location of airport in North Kalimantan / Indonesia TRK (Indonesia)

Runways
Direction	Length		Surface
Direction	m	ft	Surface
06/24	2,250	7,382	Asphalt

Statistics (2024)
- Passengers: 651,557 (▲29.5%)
- Cargo (tonnes): 9,859 (▲47.8%)
- Aircraft movements: 10,915 (▲55.7%)
- Source: DGCA

Juwata International Airport (IATA: TRK, ICAO: WAQQ) is an international airport serving Tarakan, the largest city in North Kalimantan, Indonesia. Located on the island of Tarakan off the coast of Borneo, the airport lies approximately 3.5 km from the city center and is the largest and busiest airport in North Kalimantan. It currently operates only domestic flights to major Indonesian cities such as Jakarta, Balikpapan, and Surabaya, as well as serving rural destinations in Kalimantan's interior. The airport's proximity to the tripoint border of Indonesia, Malaysia, and the Philippines makes it a strategically important location for development as a regional hub. The airport previously offered international flights to Tawau in Sabah, Malaysia and Zamboanga in the Philippines, but all international routes were suspended in 2020 due to the COVID-19 pandemic. As a result of the prolonged absence of international services, its international airport status was officially revoked in 2024. The status was reinstated the following year.

The airport shares its area and runway with Suharnoko Harbani Air Force Base, a Type A airbase of the Indonesian Air Force. Established in 2006, the airbase was part of a broader strategy to enhance national defense against emerging threats and to support the operational needs of the 2nd Air Operations Command in Makassar. Prior to its establishment, the airbase was just an Air Force post operated under the jurisdiction of Balikpapan Air Force Base. However, rising tensions with Malaysia over the Ambalat area prompted the Air Force leadership to establish a dedicated base in Tarakan. As the airport is used for both military and civilian purposes, the apron is shared by both sectors. In 2014, a 183-meter taxiway was constructed to connect the civilian facilities to the military apron, which is capable of accommodating up to four Sukhoi Su-30 fighter jets and two C-130 Hercules transport aircraft simultaneously.

== History ==
=== World War II ===
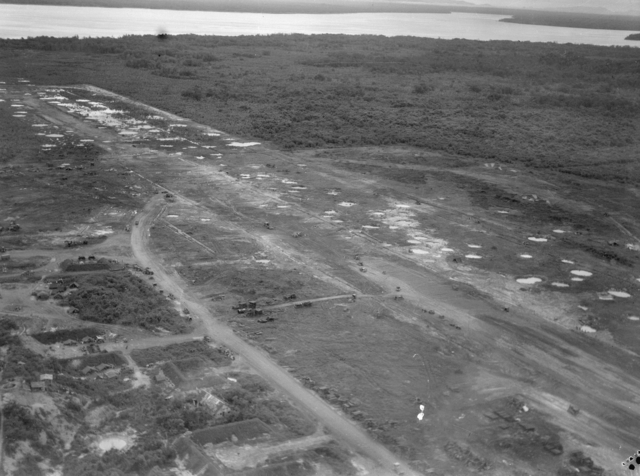
Tarakan airstrip in May 1945, following liberation by the Australian forces

Juwata Airport was originally constructed by the Dutch colonial government and served as a military base for the Royal Netherlands East Indies Air Force (ML-KNIL). Initially, the airport was constructed with a 1,500-meter runway. The airbase played a role in the First Battle of Tarakan, which began on 11 January 1942, a day after Japan declared war on the Netherlands. It was one of the key strategic objectives for Japanese forces at the onset of their invasion of the Dutch East Indies. However, the airbase was too small to function effectively as a defensive stronghold. It lacked adequate facilities to accommodate both fighters and bombers and was poorly defended, equipped only with 20 mm anti-aircraft guns and machine guns. As a result, the Dutch abandoned the airbase before the Japanese landing, allowing it to be captured intact. On 13 January 1942, the Dutch attempted to render the airbase unusable by launching an air raid with 15 Martin B-10 bombers, which caused considerable damage. Nevertheless, the Japanese quickly repaired the airbase and used it as a staging ground for their subsequent invasion of Balikpapan.

During the three-year Japanese occupation, the airbase was operated by the Imperial Japanese Navy. It became the primary Allied objective during the Second Battle of Tarakan in May 1945. At the time, around 400 personnel from the Japanese 2nd Naval Garrison Force were stationed at the airfield. The task of capturing the airstrip was assigned to the Australian Army's 2/24th Battalion. Their initial assault on the night of 2 May was delayed when Japanese forces detonated large explosive charges, and the airstrip was not fully secured until 5 May. While the infantry of the 26th Brigade Group engaged Japanese forces in the surrounding hills, Royal Australian Air Force engineers from No. 61 Airfield Construction Wing worked urgently to restore the airbase to operational status. Due to extensive damage from pre-invasion bombings and the marshy terrain, repairs proved far more difficult than anticipated. What was expected to take one week instead took eight. Engineers used large quantities of Marston Mat—interlocking steel plates—to stabilize the runway. Some remnants of these plates can still be seen today in the airport's parking area. While the airstrip was finally opened on 28 June, this was too late for it to play any role in supporting the landings in Brunei or Labuan, or the landings at Balikpapan. However No. 78 Wing RAAF was based on Tarakan from 28 June and flew in support of the Balikpapan operation until the end of the war.

=== Contemporary history ===
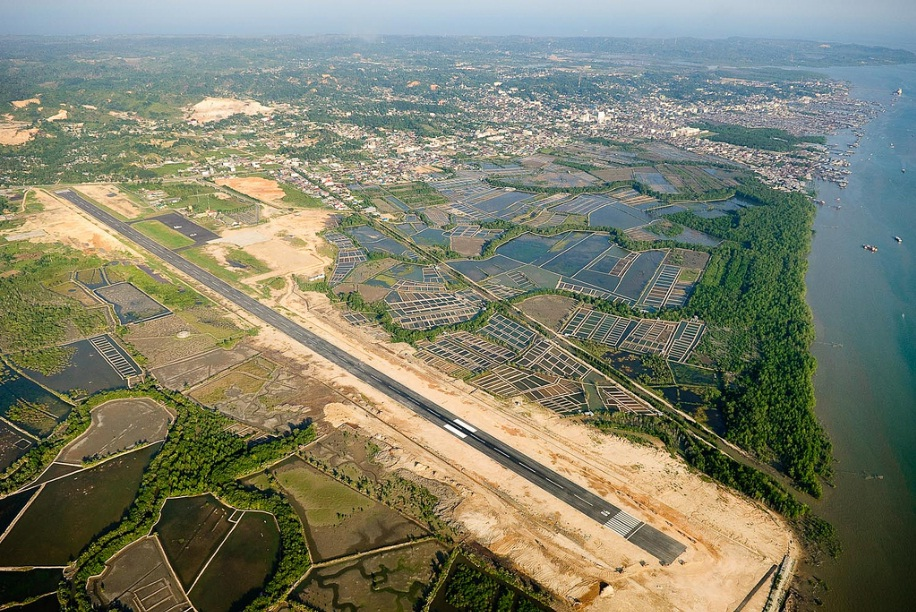
Aerial view of Juwata Airport in 2012, prior to the construction of the new terminal

After the war, the airport was handed back to the Dutch through the Netherlands Indies Civil Administration (NICA), and later transferred to the newly independent Indonesian government following the Dutch recognition of Indonesia's sovereignty and subsequent withdrawal. Initially, the airport operated as a pioneer airfield, serving rural routes with small aircraft.

Due to its strategic geographical location, the airport was one of the earliest international airports in Kalimantan, with routes to Zamboanga in the Philippines and Tawau, Malaysia since the early 1970s. At the time, the route to Zamboanga was operated by Bouraq Indonesian Airlines, with onward connections to Balikpapan. At the same time, the government began planning to upgrade the airport to accommodate larger aircraft, such as the Fokker F27.

In 2000, the runway was extended to 1,850 meters, enabling the airport to accommodate narrow-body aircraft such as the Boeing 737 and Airbus A320.

During the 2010 Tarakan riot, negotiation between the Bugis and Tidung communities to end the conflict was held in the airport.

All international flights were suspended in 2020 due to the COVID-19 pandemic, and the airport's international status was officially revoked in 2024 due to the prolonged absence of scheduled international services. The North Kalimantan provincial government is actively working to restore the airport's international status and resume international flights. The airport is planned to be a transit hub for people from other countries such as Malaysia, Brunei and Philippines traveling to other cities in Indonesia.

In August 2025, following a decree issued by the Ministry of Transportation, the airport’s international status was reinstated. The following month, the airport announced plans to launch an international route to Guangzhou, China, with the aim of boosting import and export activities in Tarakan. Plans are also underway to resume flights to Tawau and introduce a new route to Kota Kinabalu in Sabah, Malaysia.

== Facilities and development ==
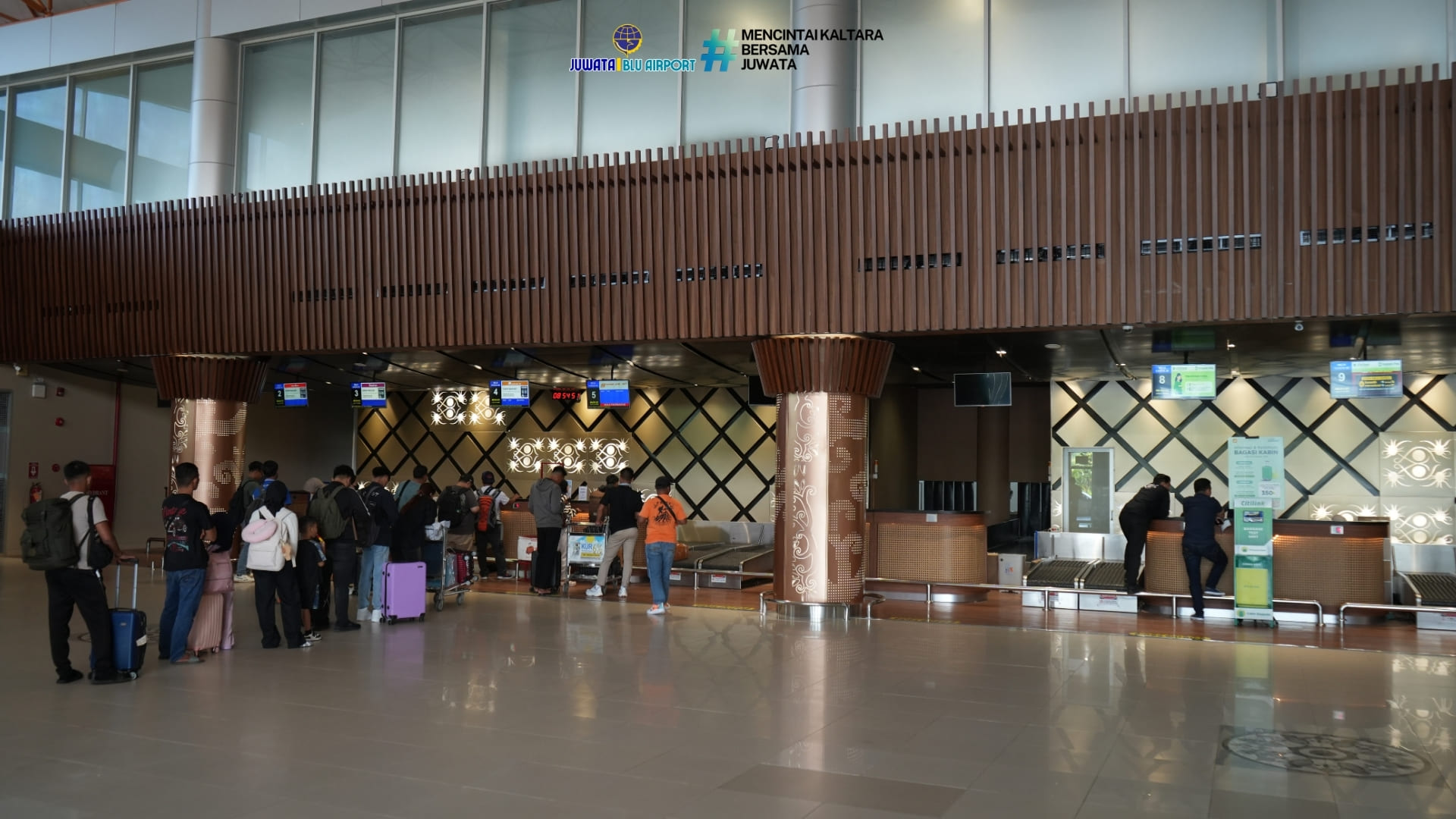
Check-in hall

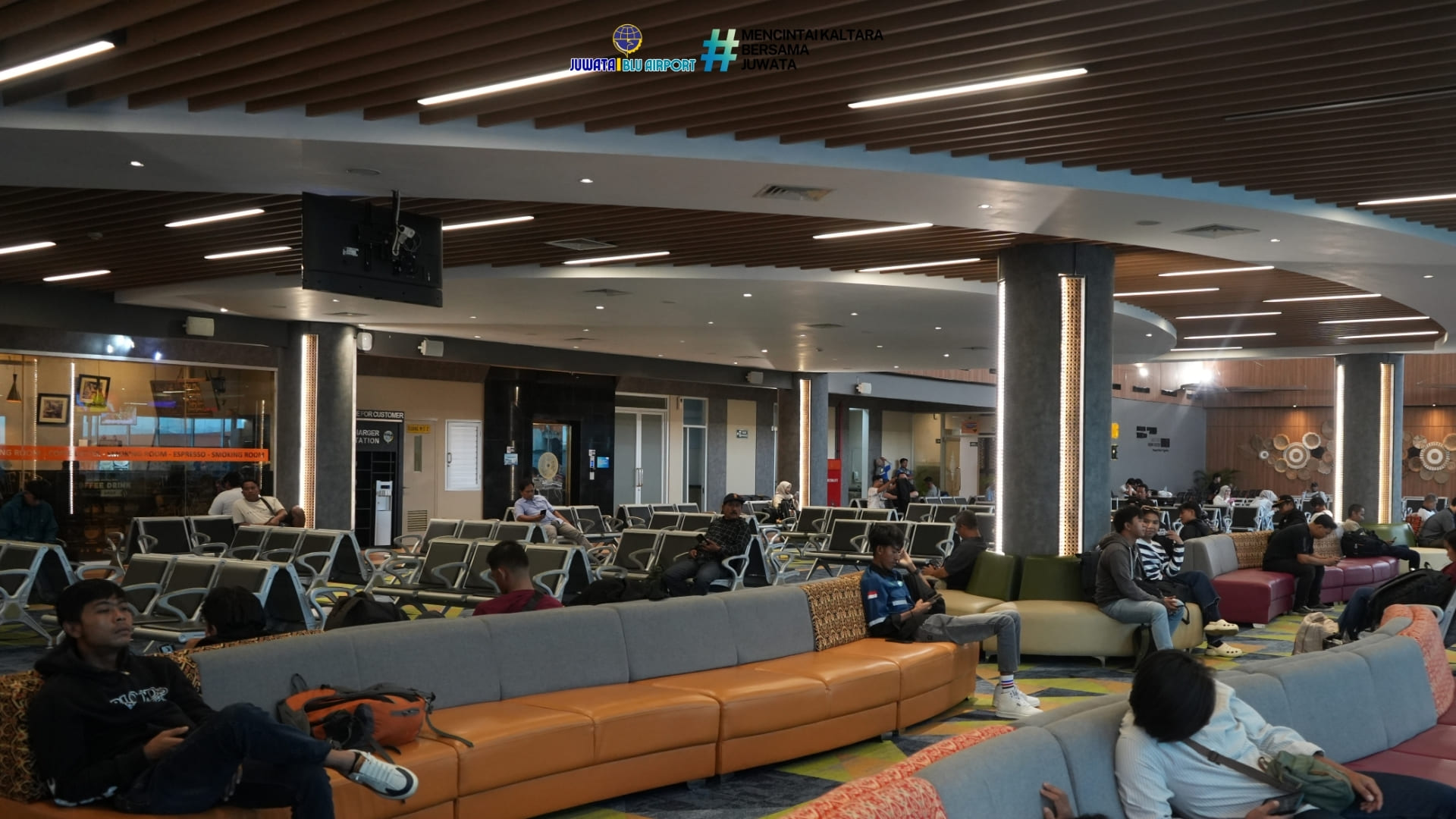
Boarding gate

To accommodate the growing number of passengers and increasing air traffic, major development works were undertaken at the airport, including the construction of a larger terminal between 2010 and 2015 to replace the old terminal, which had become overcrowded. The project also included improvements and upgrades to other airport facilities on both the airside and landside. Following the opening of the new terminal, the old terminal was initially planned to be demolished to allow for further apron expansion. However, it was ultimately repurposed as a cargo terminal.

The three-story terminal, located adjacent to the old terminal, features two jet bridges and incorporates an environmentally friendly architectural design. The construction of the new terminal also included upgrades to existing infrastructure, such as the apron and lighting, enabling night flights. Both the airside and landside of the airport were significantly developed. On the airside, the apron was expanded from its original dimensions of 335 m x 70 m to 335 m x 97 m. The expanded apron can accommodate up to 12 narrow-body aircraft, compared with the previous capacity of only 10 aircraft.

On the landside, the passenger terminal was greatly enlarged, increasing from 2,532 m^{2} to 12,440 m^{2}. Additionally, the vehicle parking area was expanded from 1,000 m^{2} to 14,000 m^{2}. The new terminal increased the airport's capacity, with the old terminal serving only 600 passengers daily, while the new one can accommodate 2,000 passengers per day. The new terminal was officially inaugurated on 23 March 2016 by then-President Joko Widodo. The total cost for the construction of the new terminal and its associated infrastructure amounted to approximately 160 billion rupiah.

There are plans to extend the airport's current 2,250 m (7,380 ft)-meter runway by 400 m (1,300 ft) to a total length of 2,650 m (8,690 ft), in order to accommodate larger aircraft and increased payload capacity. The runway extension is planned to be carried out through land reclamation due to the limited availability of land.

In 2022, Susi Air expressed interest in constructing an aircraft hangar at Juwata Airport. The proposed 30 × 30 m hangar would be used to house Susi Air aircraft operating pioneer routes to and from Tarakan.

== Airlines and destinations ==
=== Passenger ===
Airlines	Destinations
Batik Air	Jakarta–Soekarno-Hatta
Citilink	Balikpapan
Lion Air	Surabaya
Super Air Jet	Balikpapan, Makassar (Note: Makassar is the continuation of Balikpapan flight, operating under the same flight number.)
Susi Air	Long Apung, Long Bawan, Malinau, Maratua

== Statistics ==
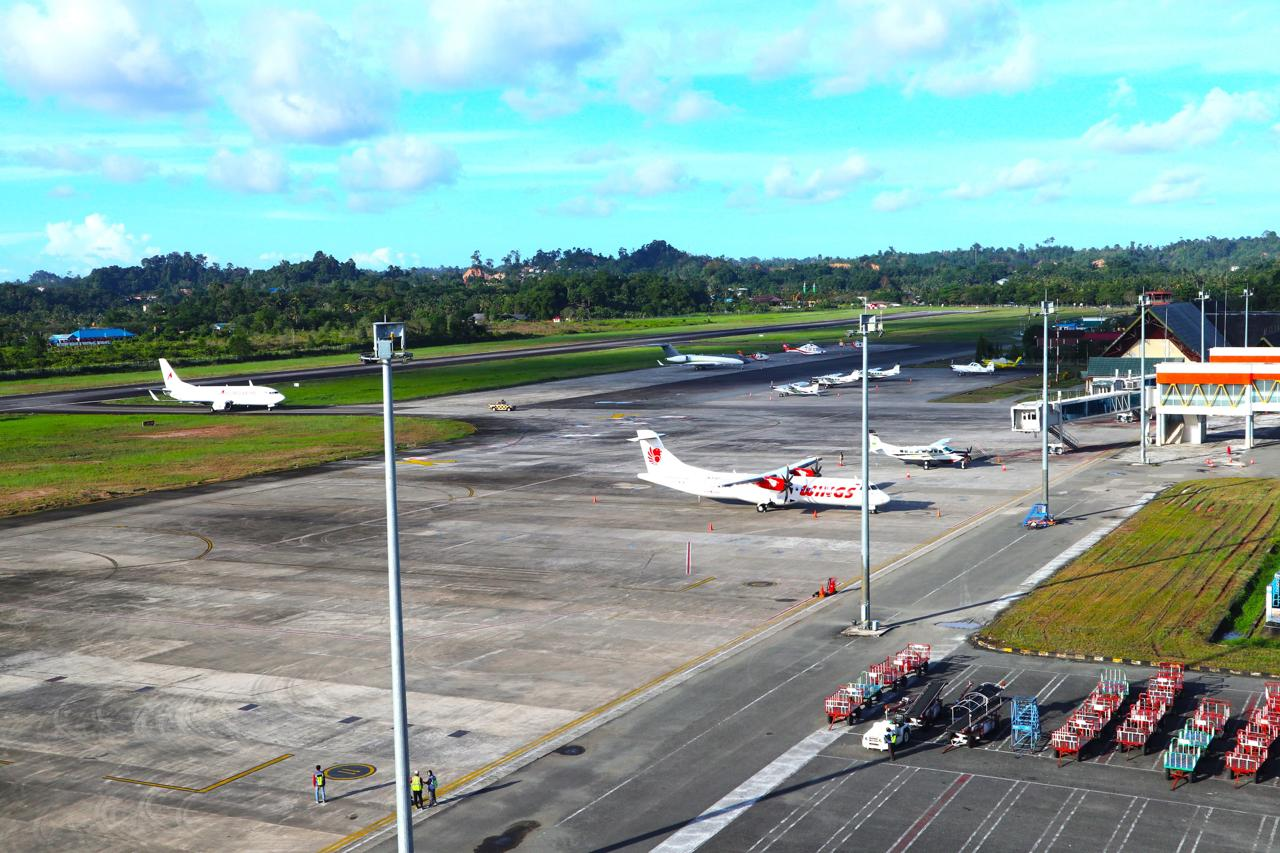
Aircraft at Juwata Airport

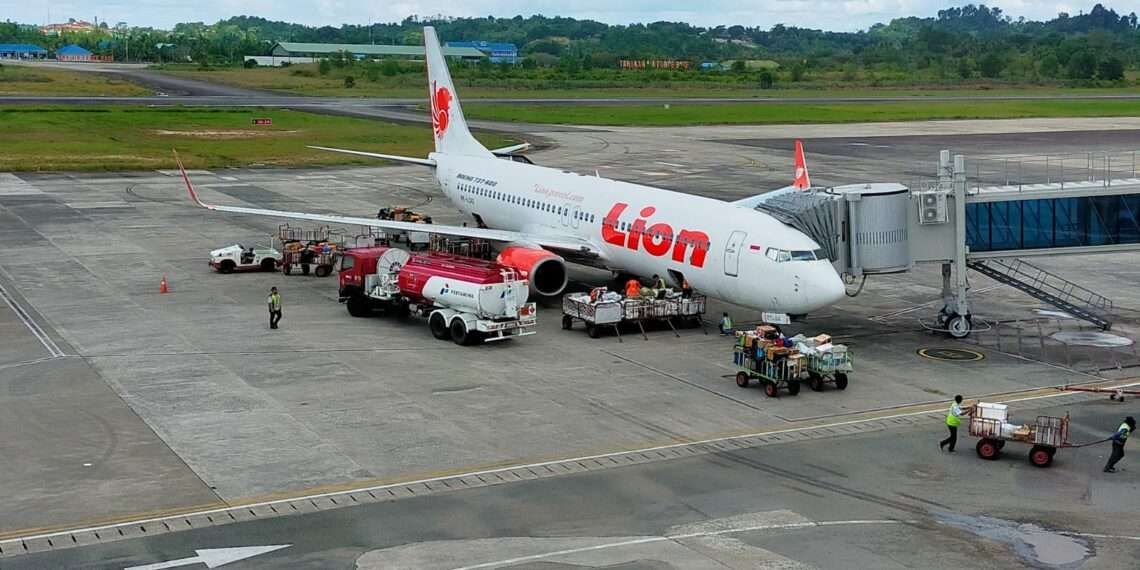
A Lion Air Boeing 737-800 at Juwata Airport

Annual passenger numbers and aircraft statistics
Year	Passengers handled	Passenger % change	Cargo (tonnes)	Cargo % change	Aircraft movements	Aircraft % change
2006	384,562	Steady	4,335	Steady	8,140	Steady
2007	397,165	▲3.3	4,738	▲9.3	8,493	▲4.3
2008	370,960	▼6.6	4,581	▼3.3	6,165	▼27.4
2009	474,757	▲28.0	4,999	▲9.1	8,439	▲36.9
2010	1,201,903	▲153.2	5,977	▲19.6	10,797	▲27.9
2011	700,910	▼41.7	7,723	▲29.2	12,742	▲18.0
2012	721,810	▲3.0	7,162	▼7.3	9,254	▼27.4
2013	993,674	▲37.7	9,102	▲27.1	14,286	▲54.4
2014	1,090,409	▲9.7	9,266	▲1.8	13,085	▼8.4
2015	1,002,484	▼8.1	6,888	▼25.7	12,652	▼3.3
2016	1,008,889	▲0.6	18,992	▲175.7	12,194	▼3.6
2017	1,031,033	▲2.2	6,157	▼67.6	12,888	▲5.7
2018	1,030,162	▼0.1	7,155	▲16.2	12,280	▼4.7
2019	791,240	▼23.2	4,769	▼33.3	8,259	▼32.7
2020	402,406	▼49.1	6,092	▲27.7	5,094	▼38.3
2021	365,395	▼9.2	9,142	▲50.1	4,308	▼15.4
2022	449,766	▲23.1	9,391	▲2.7	5,307	▲23.2
2023	503,136	▲11.9	6,672	▼29.0	7,011	▲32.1
2024	651,557	▲29.5	9,859	▲47.8	10,915	▲55.7
^{Source: DGCA, BPS}

== Accidents and incidents ==
- On 3 October 2006, a Mandala Airlines Boeing 737-200 arriving from Balikpapan skidded off the runway during landing and veered approximately 50 meters beyond the runway's end, reportedly due to reduced visibility caused by smog from nearby forest fires. All passengers survived, with some sustaining minor injuries.
- On 27 January 2016, a Susi Air Pilatus PC-6 Porter used for pilot training skidded off the runway after landing and veered approximately 30 meters from the runway. None of the occupants were injured, and the aircraft sustained only minor damage.
