= Robert Atty Bessing Airport =

Robert Atty Bessing Airport Bandar Udara Robert Atty Bessing
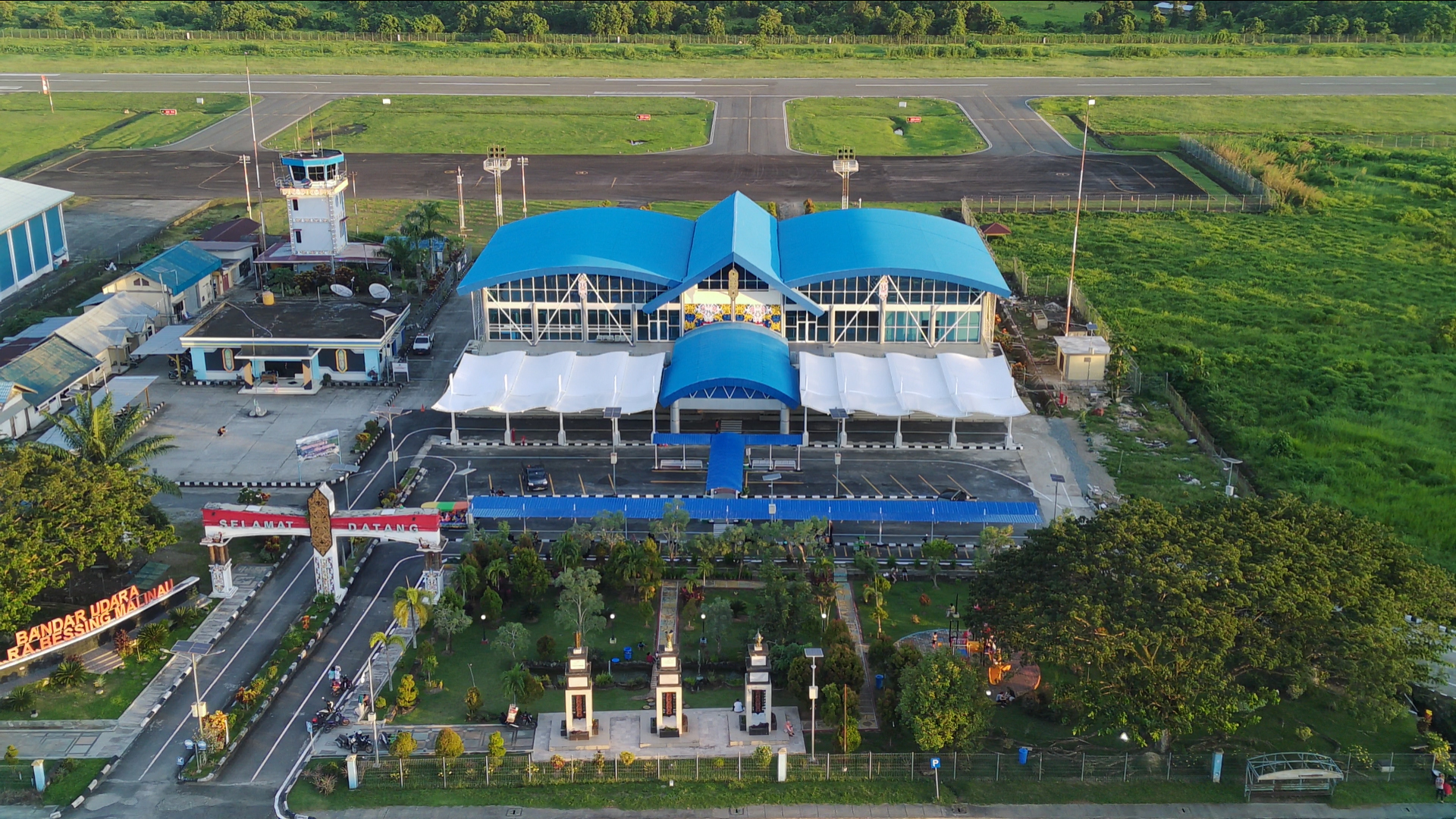
- IATA: LNU; ICAO: WAQM

Summary
- Airport type: Public
- Owner: Government of Indonesia
- Operator: Directorate General of Civil Aviation
- Serves: Malinau Kota
- Location: Malinau Kota, Malinau Regency, North Kalimantan, Indonesia
- Time zone: WITA (UTC+08:00)
- Elevation AMSL: 8 m (26 ft)
- Coordinates: 03°34′31″N 116°37′11″E

Map
- Location of airport in Indonesia

Runways
| Direction | Length | | Surface |
| Direction | m | ft | Surface |
|---|---|---|---|
| 04/22 | 1,450 | 4,757 | Asphalt |

Statistics (2024)
- Passengers: 41,936 (▲4.9%)
- Cargo (tonnes): 245.63 (▲164.1%)
- Aircraft movements: 5,142 (▲16.9%)
- Source: DGCA

Robert Atty Bessing Airport (IATA: LNU, ICAO: WAQM), officially Kolonel Robert Atty Bessing Airport, formerly Seluwing Airport, is a domestic regional airport serving Malinau Kota, the administrative seat of Malinau Regency, North Kalimantan, Indonesia. It is located in the Indonesian territory of Kalimantan on the island of Borneo. The airport is named after Robert Atty Bessing, a former colonel in the Indonesian Army who later served as Regent of Bulungan, the regency in which the airport was located before Malinau Regency was established in 1999. The airport is located close to the town center, approximately 2 km (1.2 mi) from the Malinau Regent's Office, and serves as the main gateway to Malinau and the surrounding areas. It also serves as a local hub for Susi Air, which operates pioneer flights to remote areas of North Kalimantan. In addition, Wings Air operates scheduled flights from the airport to Balikpapan.

== History ==
=== Construction and early history ===
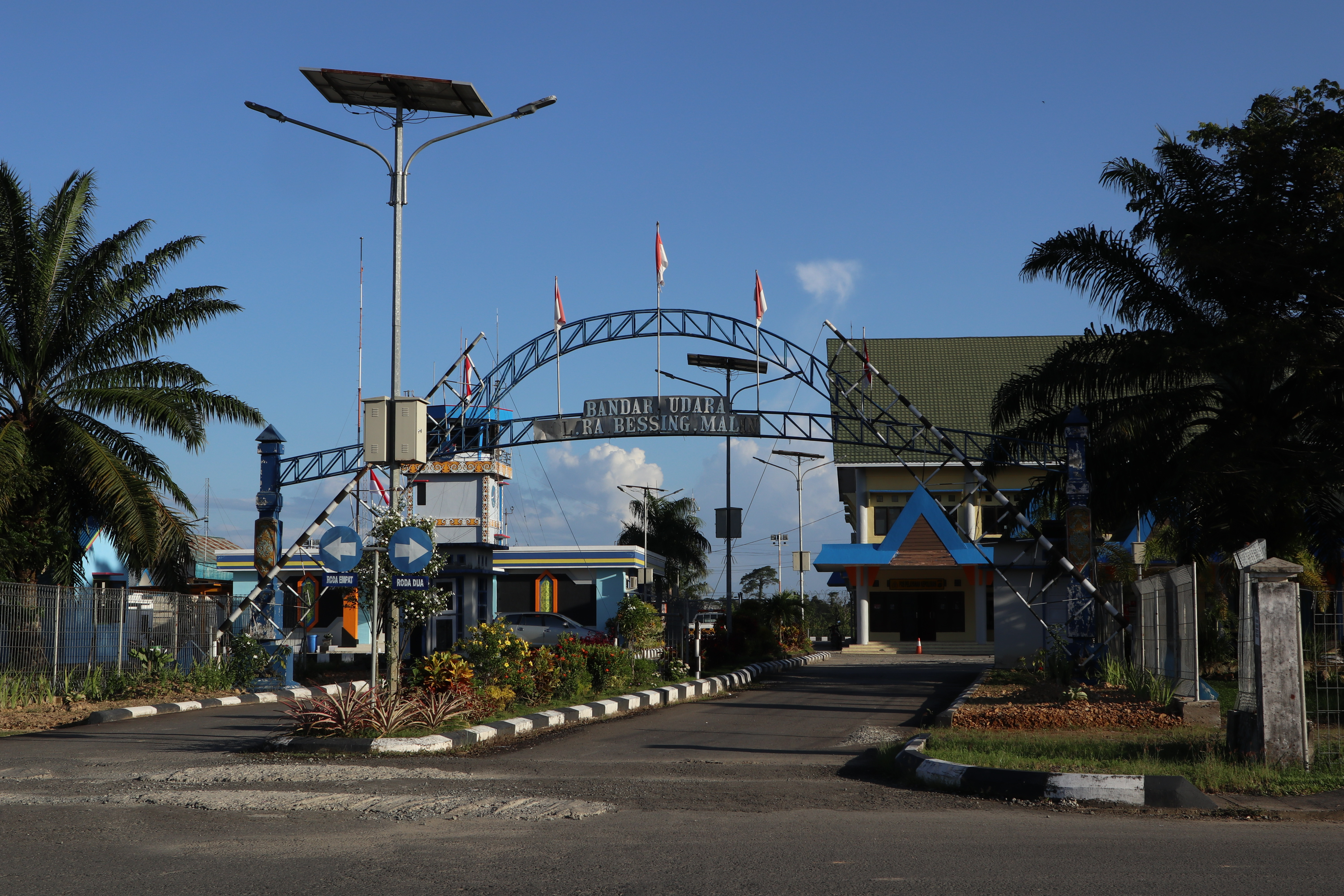
Airport front gate

The history of the airport dates back to the need for improved air transportation infrastructure to facilitate mobility in Malinau and the surrounding areas. In 1995, the Bulungan Regency Government received financial assistance from the central government to construct an airport serving Malinau and its surrounding communities. Construction began in 1997 and was completed in 1998. The airport has since become a vital air transportation lifeline for the border region of North Kalimantan, playing a crucial role in overcoming the geographical isolation that has long posed a significant challenge to the area. Following the establishment of Malinau Regency as a separate administrative entity from Bulungan Regency in 1999, the airport also became an important symbol of the region’s growing self-reliance and a key component of its transportation infrastructure.

The airport was originally known as Seluwing Airport. The name “Seluwing” refers to the local geographical identity of the area where the original runway was first constructed.

Before 2009, the airport operated primarily as a pioneer airport with limited facilities. Its runway was relatively small and could accommodate only small commercial and pioneer aircraft. In 2009, the airport began undergoing development and expansion. The runway was extended to approximately 1,450 meters in length and 30 meters in width, allowing the airport to accommodate ATR 42 and ATR 72 aircraft, which became the mainstay of commercial air services in the region. The passenger terminal was also refurbished as part of the airport’s development. The project was completed in 2010 and officially inaugurated in July 2012 by Awang Faroek Ishak, then Governor of East Kalimantan, prior to the establishment of North Kalimantan as a separate province from East Kalimantan. The development cost approximately Rp16 billion and was funded through the East Kalimantan provincial budget (APBD).

Following the runway expansion, the airport became capable of handling flights to major cities such as Balikpapan. In February 2018, Wings Air launched a direct route between Malinau and Balikpapan, connecting the town with one of Kalimantan’s major aviation gateways and providing onward connections to numerous destinations across Indonesia.

=== Contemporary history ===
In 2019, the airport was renamed Kolonel Robert Atty Bessing Airport in honor of Robert Atty Bessing, an Indonesian Army officer and former Regent of Bulungan Regency. He played an important role in the separation and establishment of Malinau Regency, which was intended to accelerate the region’s development. The renaming was met with opposition from some local residents, particularly members of the indigenous Tidung community in Malinau Kota. Critics questioned Bessing’s historical contribution to Malinau and argued that his role in the region’s political history, including the formation of the regency and the political dynamics surrounding its early administration, was subject to differing interpretations. The opposition was also influenced by broader local political considerations surrounding the creation of Malinau Regency, including the centralized nature of government decision-making during the pre-expansion period and disagreements over the proposed administrative boundaries of the new regency. Some residents argued that the airport should instead be named after a local figure with a stronger historical connection to Malinau and its indigenous communities.

A high-profile incident occurred at the airport on 2 February 2022, when officers from the Malinau Regency municipal police forcibly removed several Susi Air aircraft from their hangar using chains. The action was reportedly taken after the lease on Susi Air’s hangar expired following 10 years of use. Susi Air had previously sought to extend the lease, but its request was rejected by the Malinau Regency Government. The airline subsequently requested a three-month extension to vacate the hangar, allowing it to gradually remove its aircraft and equipment. Susi Air called on the Regent and Regional Secretary of Malinau to issue a written apology to the airline’s management over the forced eviction from the hangar and the forcible removal of its aircraft. The airline also sought Rp8.95 billion in compensation for operational losses resulting from the incident.

Subsequently, Smart Aviation took over several pioneer routes previously operated by Susi Air. However, in January 2026, Susi Air resumed operating pioneer air services in North Kalimantan, including routes to and from Malinau.

As of 2026, the airport is actively seeking to attract airlines to open new routes to Malinau, including a proposed connection to Samarinda to complement existing services to Balikpapan and Tarakan. Proposals have also been put forward to establish a route to Tanjung Selor, the capital of North Kalimantan. However, the route is not currently considered a priority due to the availability of adequate land transportation between Malinau and Tanjung Selor.

== Facilities and development ==
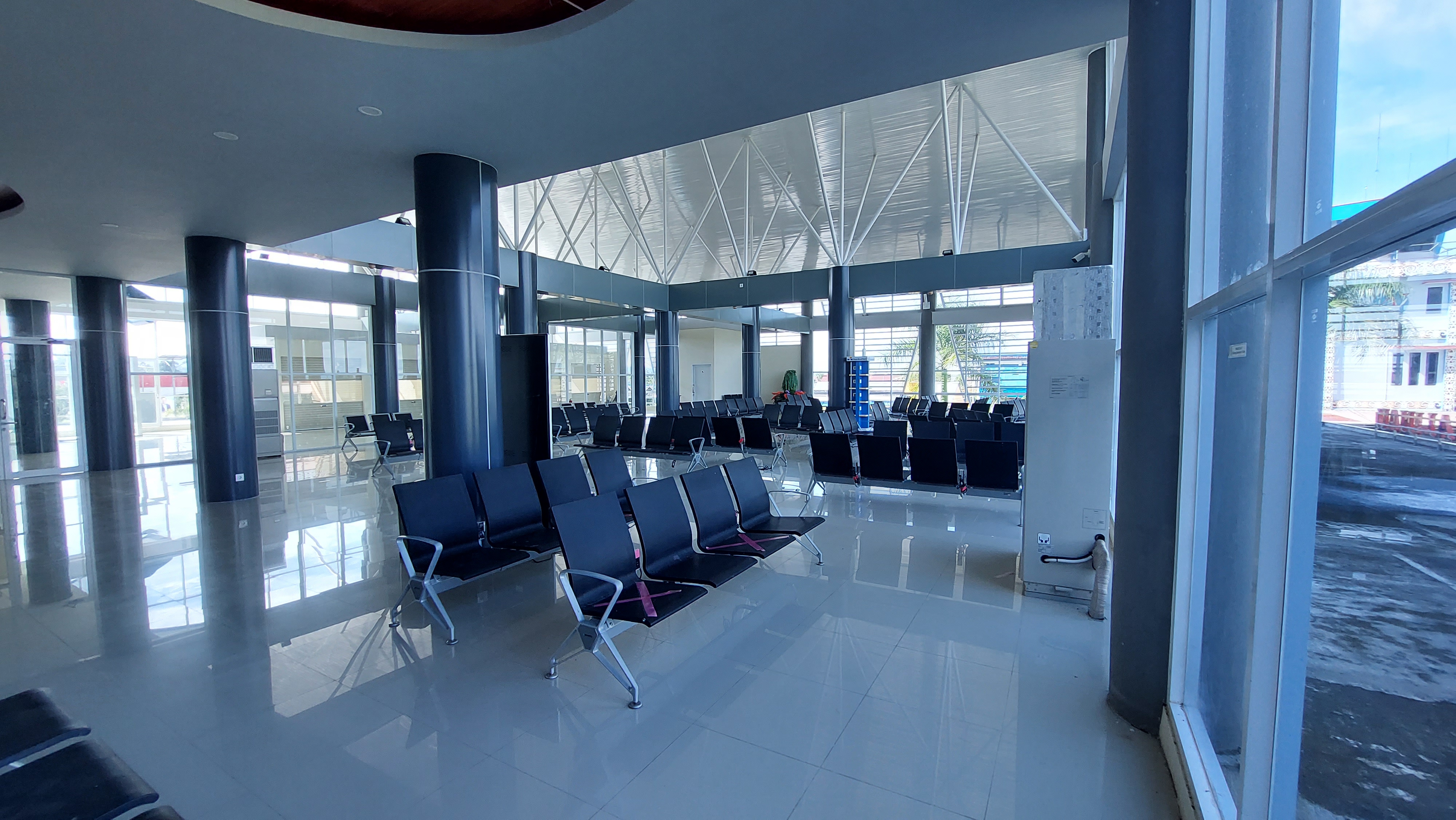
Boarding gate

The airport covers a total area of 48 hectares. The current passenger terminal occupies approximately 3,000 m² across two floors and is capable of handling tens of thousands of passengers annually. The terminal is equipped with basic passenger facilities, including check-in counters, departure gates, an arrival hall, baggage claim area, prayer room, VIP room, restaurants, ticket counters, and souvenir shops. To support the distribution of goods in the border region, the airport is equipped with a 200 m² cargo terminal and a dedicated 500 m² parking area. The facility serves as a vital link for the distribution of essential goods from the urban center to remote districts such as Long Bawan and Long Apung via pioneer air services. Minor renovations to the passenger terminal, parking areas, and front yard were carried out in 2023. The airport is also equipped with Aircraft Rescue and Fire Fighting (PKP-PK) facilities, although they remain limited. Plans have been proposed to add additional vehicles to accommodate the increasing number of flights to Malinau.

On the airside, the airport has a single runway measuring 1,600 m × 30 m, although only 1,450 m is currently in use. The runway can accommodate aircraft such as the ATR 72 and CASA C-212 Aviocar. In the future, the runway is planned to be extended to 1,800 m, allowing aircraft such as the ATR 72 to operate with a full payload. Ultimately, the runway is planned to be extended to 2,400 m, enabling the airport to accommodate narrow-body aircraft such as the Boeing 737 and Airbus A320. Plans for the extension have been in place since 2017, with the North Kalimantan provincial government allocating a proposed budget of Rp60 billion for a 200 m runway extension. However, the project had not been realized as of 2026. In addition to the runway, the airport has three taxiways, each measuring approximately 71 m × 51 m, and a single aircraft apron measuring 190 m × 70 m. The airport also has a hangar used to accommodate small aircraft, which is typically rented by airlines operating pioneer services from Malinau to remote areas of North Kalimantan such as Susi Air and Smart Aviation.

== Airlines and destinations ==
| Airlines | Destinations |
|---|---|
| Susi Air | Binuang, Datah Dian, Long Alango, Long Apung, Long Bawan, Long Layu, Long Pujungan, Long Sule, Mahak Baru, Tarakan |
| Wings Air | Balikpapan |

== Statistics ==
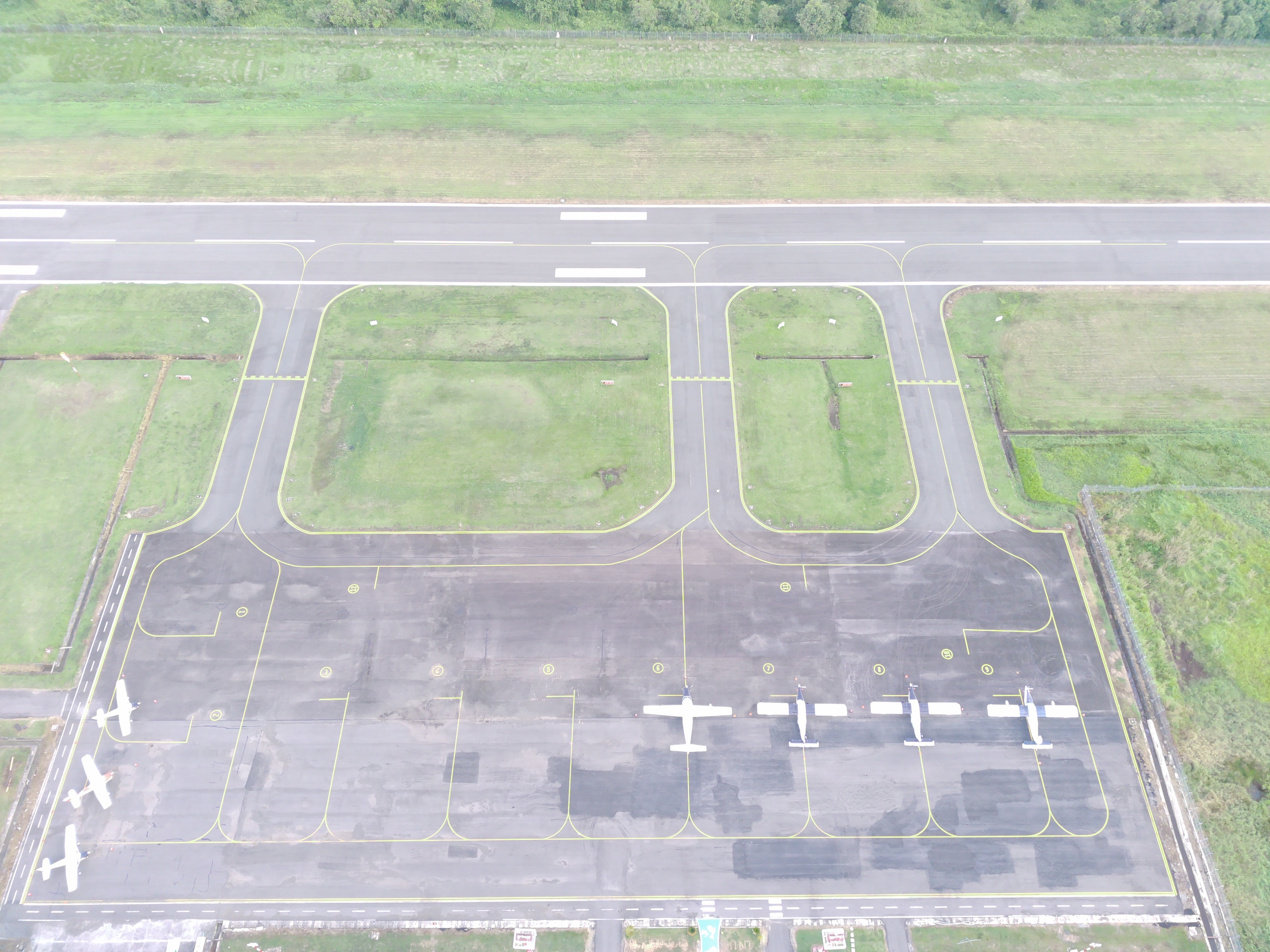
Aircraft serving rural areas lining up at Robert Atty Bessing Airport

Annual passenger numbers and aircraft statistics
| Year | Passengers handled | Passenger % change | Cargo (tonnes) | Cargo % change | Aircraft movements | Aircraft % change |
|---|---|---|---|---|---|---|
| 2006 | N/A | Steady | N/A | Steady | N/A | Steady |
| 2007 | N/A | Steady | N/A | Steady | N/A | Steady |
| 2008 | N/A | Steady | N/A | Steady | N/A | Steady |
| 2009 | N/A | Steady | N/A | Steady | N/A | Steady |
| 2010 | 10,387 | Steady | 36.83 | Steady | 1,532 | Steady |
| 2011 | 40,111 | 286.2 | 130.36 | ▲254.0 | 6,271 | ▲309.3 |
| 2012 | 23,617 | ▼41.1 | 128.81 | ▼1.2 | 3,313 | ▼47.2 |
| 2013 | 53,272 | ▲125.6 | 0.41 | ▼99.7 | 6,764 | ▲104.2 |
| 2014 | 28,916 | ▼45.7 | 24.26 | ▲5817.1 | 3,007 | ▼55.5 |
| 2015 | 58,844 | ▲103.5 | 85.82 | ▲253.8 | 5,810 | ▲93.2 |
| 2016 | 59,890 | ▲1.8 | 303.64 | ▲253.8 | 5,387 | ▼7.3 |
| 2017 | 40,225 | ▼32.8 | 26.37 | ▼91.3 | 3,937 | ▼26.9 |
| 2018 | 81,142 | ▲101.7 | 161.22 | ▲511.4 | 10,743 | ▲172.9 |
| 2019 | 83,520 | ▲2.9 | 30.62 | ▼81.0 | 4,045 | ▼62.3 |
| 2020 | 28,372 | ▼66.0 | 62.04 | ▲102.6 | 2,481 | ▼38.7 |
| 2021 | 14,959 | ▼47.3 | 131.34 | ▲111.7 | 3,154 | ▲27.1 |
| 2022 | 33,768 | ▲125.7 | 129.79 | ▼1.2 | 3,202 | ▲1.5 |
| 2023 | 39,992 | ▲18.4 | 93.02 | ▼28.3 | 4,399 | ▲37.4 |
| 2024 | 41,936 | ▲4.9 | 245.63 | ▲164.1 | 5,142 | ▲16.9 |
^{Source: DGCA, BPS}
