= Husein Sastranegara Airport =

Airport in Bandung, West Java, Indonesia

Husein Sastranegara Airport Bandar Udara Husein Sastranegara
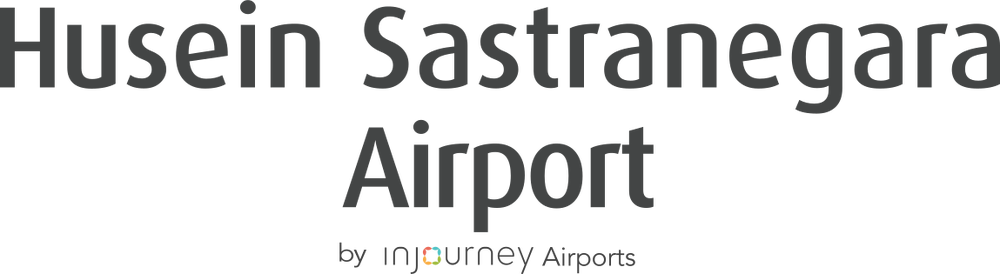

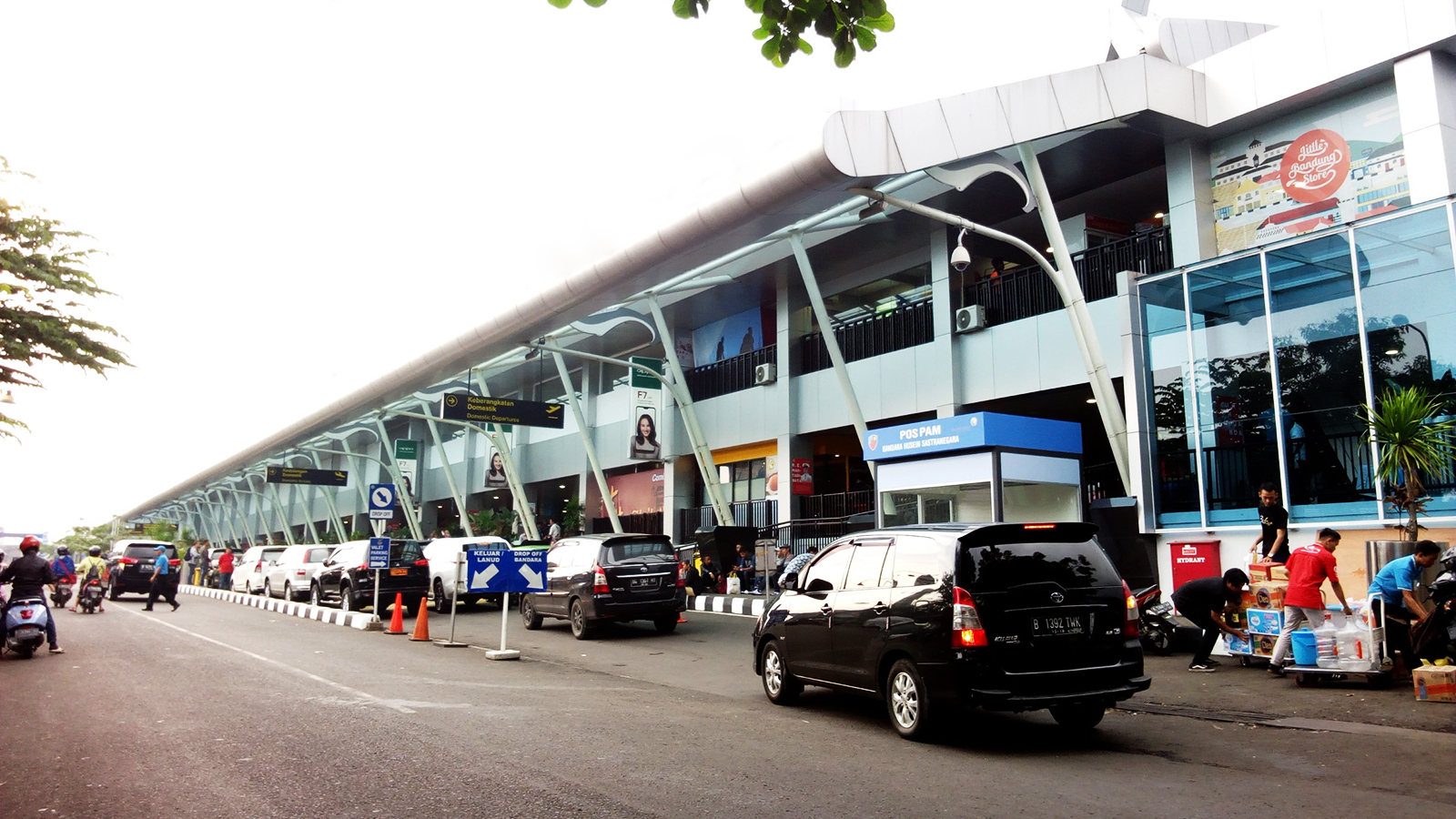
- IATA: BDO; ICAO: WICC

Summary
- Airport type: Public / Military
- Owner: Indonesian Air Force
- Operator: InJourney Airports
- Serves: Bandung metropolitan area
- Location: Husen Sastranegara, Cicendo, Bandung, West Java, Indonesia
- Opened: 1 March 1925; 101 years ago
- Time zone: WIB (UTC+07:00)
- Elevation AMSL: 2,436 ft (742 m)
- Coordinates: 06°54′02″S 107°34′35″E
- Website: www.huseinsastranegara-airport.co.id

Map
- Location within Bandung Location within Java Location within Indonesia

Runways
Direction	Length		Surface
Direction	m	ft	Surface
11/29	2,220	7,283	Asphalt

Statistics (2024)
- Passengers: 3,532 (▼99.5%)
- Cargo (tonnes): 16 (▼99.6%)
- Aircraft movements: 1,895 (▼69.4%)
- Source: DGCA

Husein Sastranegara Airport (IATA: BDO, ICAO: WICC) is an international airport serving Bandung, the capital of West Java, Indonesia. It is located within the city, approximately 3.5 km (2.2 miles) from Bandung's city center. The airport is named after Husein Sastranegara, an Indonesian Air Force officer who died during the Indonesian National Revolution when his aircraft crashed in Yogyakarta. Prior to the opening of Kertajati International Airport, the airport served as an international gateway and the primary air entry point to Bandung and its surrounding regions. It handled domestic flights to major Indonesian cities such as Denpasar, Surabaya, and Yogyakarta, as well as international routes to Kuala Lumpur and Singapore. However, following the inauguration of Kertajati Airport, most flights were relocated, leading to the suspension of international services and the revocation of its international status. As of July 2026, Husein Sastranegara Airport functions as a secondary airport for Bandung, handling only very limited commercial operations, with Susi Air serving as its sole airline operator. In 2026, the Indonesian government decided to reactivate the airport for scheduled commercial jet services, targeting limited jet operations from 17 August 2026 and full operations from 17 September 2026.

While the airport's commercial operations are managed by InJourney Airports, the land itself is owned by the Indonesian Air Force, with the passenger terminal operating as a civil enclave. The airport shares its facilities with Husein Sastranegara Air Force Base, a Type A airbase of the Indonesian Air Force. In addition, the headquarters and manufacturing facilities of Dirgantara Indonesia, the country's national aerospace firm, are located within the airport complex.

== History ==
=== Colonial era ===
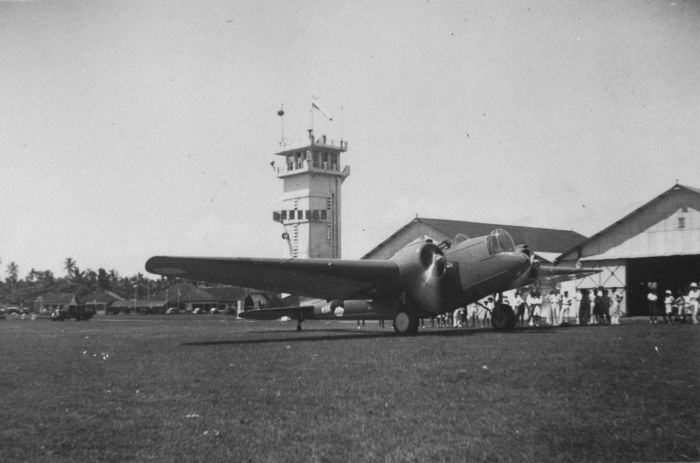
A Martin B-10 bomber of the Royal Netherlands East Indies Army Air Force (ML-KNIL) at Andir airfield (1937)

In 1918, the Dutch East Indies government constructed two airstrips in Cipagalo and Sukamiskin. At the time, the runways were simple compacted earth surfaces. The airfields were officially opened in 1920, when aviation activity consisted of a single aircraft making a brief demonstration flight at an altitude of around 50 meters. However, due to persistent issues with muddy ground conditions caused by insufficient surface reinforcement, the colonial authorities developed a new airstrip in the Cicukang area of Cibeureum village, which later became known as Andir Airfield. This airfield was used by the Royal Netherlands East Indies Army Air Force (ML-KNIL). Construction began around 1921 on a 45-hectare site. The land was acquired from local Bandung residents by the colonial government. Among the first aircraft to operate at Andir Airfield were models such as Avro, Glenn Martin, and Koolhoven. The facilities were still very basic, consisting of compacted ground without asphalt surfacing. Equipment from the Sukamiskin airfield was gradually relocated to Andir, and supporting infrastructure was developed over time. Of the original supporting buildings, only a few remnants remain today, one of which has been repurposed as a hangar for the Indonesian Air Force.

Commercial operations began on 1 November 1928, marking the inauguration of the Dutch East Indies’ national carrier, KNILM. On that date, the airline launched its first route between Bandung and Surabaya using the Fokker F.VII. The ceremony was attended by Andries Cornelis Dirk de Graeff, the Governor-General of the Dutch East Indies. At the time, however, flights did not yet operate all the way to Surabaya, but only as far as Semarang due to poor ground conditions at Morokrembangan Airfield in Surabaya. As a result, passengers continued their journey to Surabaya by train from Semarang. Direct flights between Bandung and Surabaya were only introduced a year later by KNILM. At the same time, in addition to services to Semarang and Surabaya, the airline also introduced daily scheduled flights to Tjililitan Airfield (now Halim Perdanakusuma International Airport) in Batavia. By the early 1930s, Andir Airfield had developed into a technical maintenance hub for both KNILM and KLM, the national carrier of the Netherlands, and was already capable of accommodating modern aircraft such as the Douglas DC-3.

=== World War II and the Indonesian National Revolution ===
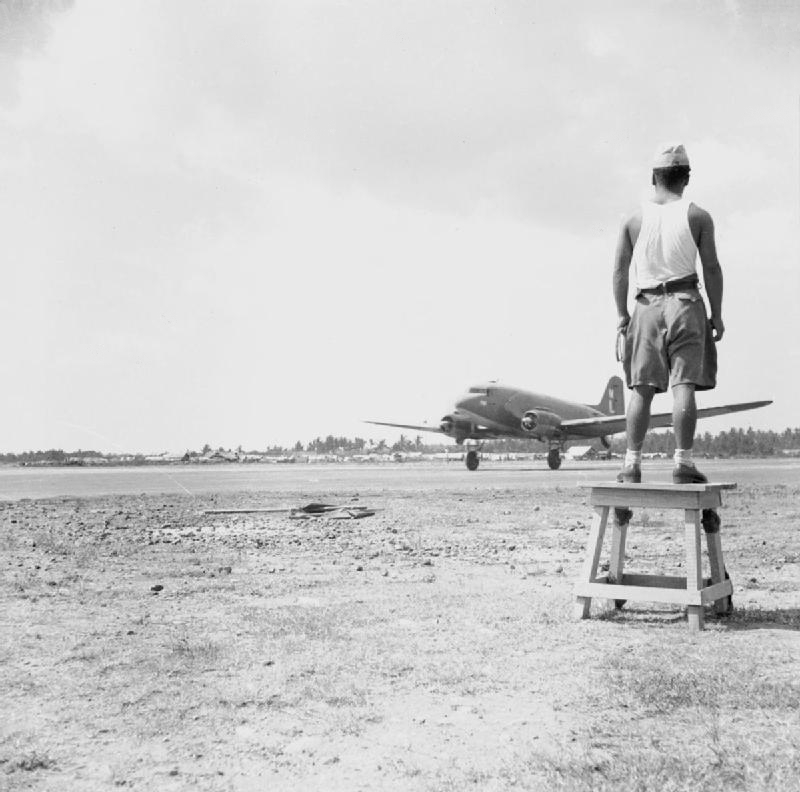
A Japanese prisoner of war watching a Royal Air Force C-47 Dakota landing at Andir Airfield, 1946

When the Pacific War, part of World War II, broke out in 1941, Andir Airfield served as the home base of the Ie Vliegtuiggroep (1st Air Group, VIG-I) of the ML-KNIL. The unit comprised two afdelingen (divisions), each operating nine Martin B-10 bombers along with two reserve aircraft. At the time, Andir Airfield also hosted one of the ML-KNIL’s technical training schools. The airfield’s air defenses were very weak, consisting of only about half a dozen anti-aircraft guns.

The Japanese recognized the airfield’s strategic importance and therefore subjected it to repeated air raids during the invasion. When the invasion began, Andir Airfield was defended by units of the Royal Netherlands East Indies Army (KNIL) and the British Army, which operated the airfield’s anti-aircraft defenses. Aircraft of the ML-KNIL based at Andir Airfield, including Martin B-10s and Brewster F2A Buffalos, were used to attack Japanese positions and slow their advance. Nevertheless, the Japanese landed at Eretan Wetan, Indramayu, on 28 February 1942 and captured Kalijati Airfield in Subang on 2 March. This left Andir Airfield as the last airfield in western Java still under Allied control. The remaining aircraft at Kalijati were evacuated to Andir Airfield. Following the fall of Kalijati, the Japanese launched a major air raid on Andir, which destroyed several aircraft at the airfield, including some that had been evacuated from Kalijati. In response, the Allies decided to evacuate the remaining aircraft and personnel to Australia, while destroying those that could not be removed, including two Hawker Hurricanes. Soon afterwards, following the Allied defeat at the Battle of Tjiater Pass, Bandung was declared an open city, and Allied forces in the Dutch East Indies surrendered on 9 March. The Japanese subsequently took control of the airfield, where they found several abandoned Allied aircraft, including Curtiss P-40 Warhawks.

After its capture, the airfield was progressively improved and expanded by the Japanese throughout the occupation to support their military operations, including the addition of well-equipped facilities such as hangars, workshops, telephone and wireless telegraph systems, and fuel storage. The runway was also repaired and upgraded using captured Allied prisoners of war, who were subjected to harsh treatment by their Japanese captors.

Following Japan’s surrender, the airfield was overrun by an Indonesian mob on 8 October 1945, leading to the capitulation of the Japanese forces there with little to no resistance. A few days earlier, discussions had taken place between Basyir Surya, the head of Andir Airfield Employees’ Association (Perpela), and the Japanese commander at Andir Airfield, in which the Japanese agreed to hand over their weapons to Indonesian youths. Following the capture of the airfield, the Indonesian red-and-white flag was then raised on top of the airfield control tower. However, on 10 October, British forces arrived and assumed control of Bandung, including the airfield, forcing the Indonesian forces to withdraw. Local residents of Bandung continued to oppose the British and Allied presence throughout the Indonesian National Revolution. In March 1946, during the Bandung Sea of Fire, they managed to storm into the airfield and set fire to two British aircraft. Fighting also erupted between Allied forces and Indonesian militias around the airfield perimeter.

The British eventually withdrew, and control of the airfield passed to the Dutch. It subsequently became a major base for the ML-KNIL, serving as a key staging point for Dutch operations against Indonesian forces throughout the war. During Operation Kraai, for example, Dutch paratroopers and combat aircraft departed from the airfield for Yogyakarta in an effort to capture the city and apprehend Republican leaders.

=== Independence era ===
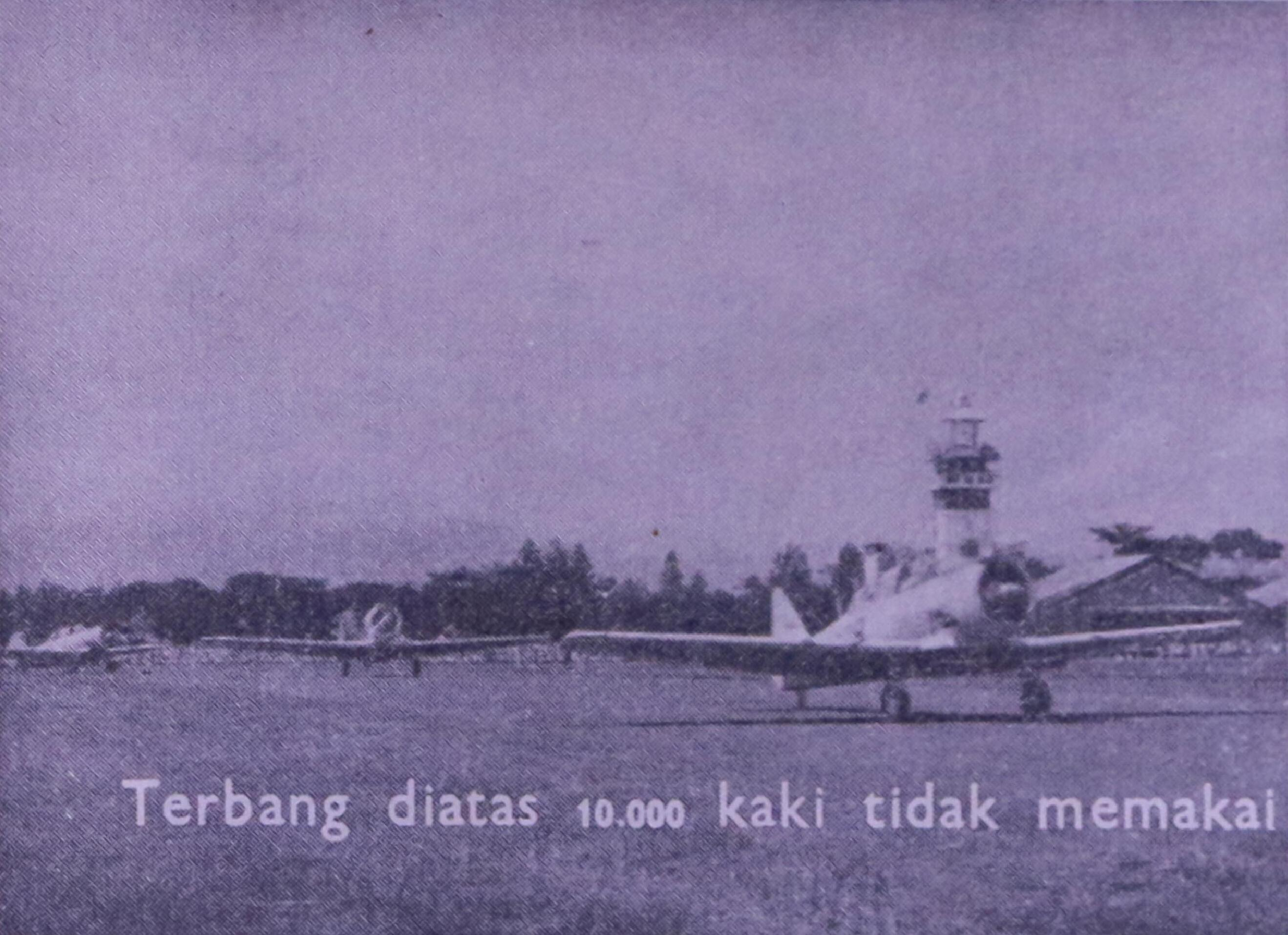
Indonesian Air Force T-6 Harvards at Andir Airfield, 1952

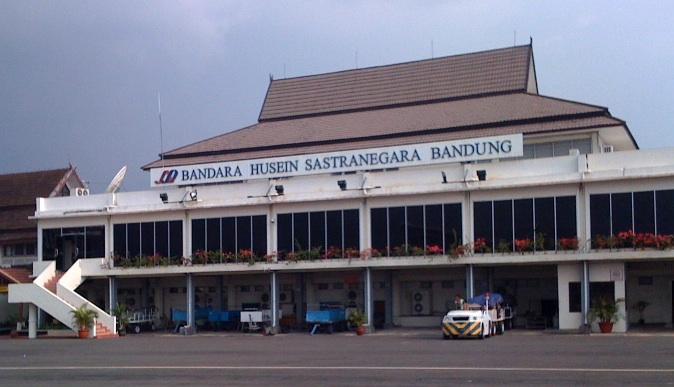
Facade of the terminal of Husein Sastranegara International Airport prior to its renovation in 2016

Following the Dutch–Indonesian Round Table Conference, the Netherlands recognized Indonesia’s sovereignty and withdrew from the region. Andir Airfield was transferred from the ML-KNIL to the Indonesian Air Force on 2 March 1950, marked by a formal ceremony. On 17 August 1952, the airfield was renamed to its present name in honor of Husein Sastranegara, an Indonesian Air Force officer who died during a test flight over Yogyakarta. The aircraft he was piloting suffered engine failure and crashed in flames, killing both Husein and a technician. He was just 27 years old at the time.

From the 1950s through the 1960s, Husein Sastranegara Airport functioned primarily as an Indonesian Air Force military airbase. It was not until 1974 that the airport began serving regular commercial flights. That year marked the formal commencement of commercial air traffic and transport services, following the establishment of a representative office of the Directorate General of Civil Aviation at the airport.

In 1994, the airport’s management was transferred from the Ministry of Transportation to Angkasa Pura II, which was later rebranded as InJourney Airports. In 1995, the airport had already begun serving international flights to Singapore, operated by Merpati Nusantara Airlines. At the time, Merpati also operated nine daily flights between Bandung and Halim Perdanakusuma International Airport in Jakarta. Meanwhile, Sempati Air served the Bandung–Jakarta route three times daily via Soekarno–Hatta International Airport instead of Halim. Merpati also operated daily flights between Bandung and Surabaya, while Bouraq Indonesia Airlines ran a daily service to Yogyakarta.

The airport was awarded the best airport in Asia-Pacific in 2020 (2-5 million passengers per annum category) by Airports Council International.

Husein Sastranegara Airport had long served commercial domestic and international flights to and from Bandung. However, commercial operations at the airport were gradually restricted and most routes were officially discontinued on 29 October 2023. Several routes previously operated at the airport were redirected to Kertajati International Airport, as part of a policy aimed at optimizing Kertajati’s role as West Java’s primary aviation hub. In practice, however, Kertajati has yet to attract the anticipated surge in passenger traffic. This situation has created a fiscal burden for the West Java Provincial Government, as part of the financing responsibility remains at the regional level. As a result, discussions have re-emerged regarding the possible reactivation of Husein Sastranegara Airport for scheduled commercial flights.

With no international flights operating at the airport, its international status was revoked by the Ministry of Transportation on 2 April 2024.

In October 2025, the Bandung City Government proposed the "West Java Twin Airports" concept to reactivate Husein Sastranegara Airport alongside Kertajati International Airport.

=== Reactivation ===
In June 2026, following a directive to restore Bandung's air connectivity, the Directorate General of Civil Aviation issued a letter permitting the airport to serve scheduled and non-scheduled domestic and international commercial services with both jet and turboprop aircraft. The Ministry of Transportation initially announced that the airport was scheduled to resume commercial jet services on 17 September 2026. In July 2026, the ministry announced an accelerated two-phase plan: limited jet operations (business and charter flights) from 17 August 2026, followed by full operations serving Boeing 737-800 and Airbus A320 aircraft under a slot management system from 17 September 2026. Preparatory works include overlays of the runway and taxiway, apron reconstruction, terminal roof repairs, and upgrading the airport's rescue and firefighting (ARFF) capability from category 5 to category 7. According to Bandung mayor Muhammad Farhan, eight domestic routes are planned upon reopening: Medan, Padang, Pekanbaru, Batam, Balikpapan, Pontianak, Denpasar and Makassar. The government stated that Kertajati International Airport will remain in operation and be developed as a hub for aviation-related industry, including aircraft maintenance, repair and overhaul facilities.

== Facilities and development ==
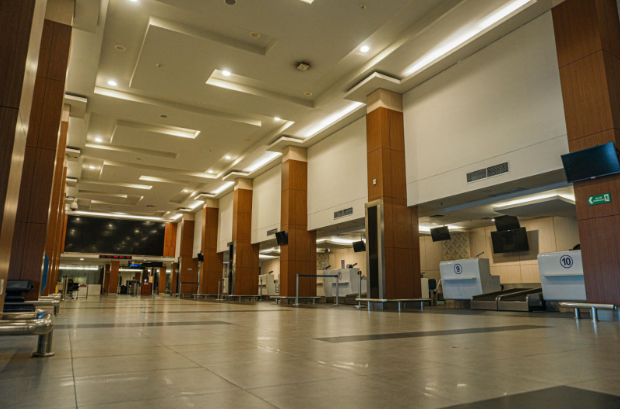
Check-in hall

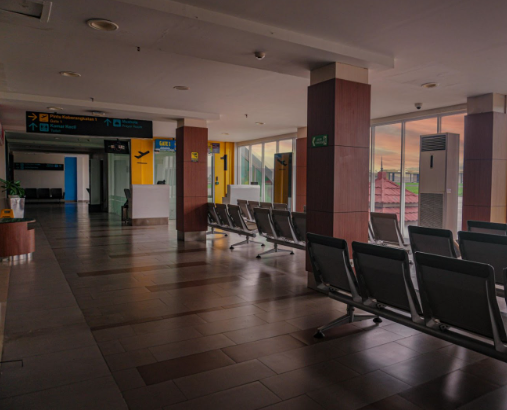
Boarding gate

The airport previously had two terminals: a domestic terminal and an international terminal. The international terminal was the original facility, in use prior to the construction of the new domestic terminal in 2016. It had an area of 5,000 m² and initially a capacity of 600,000 passengers annually before undergoing renovation. With the opening of the new terminal, the existing terminal was closed for six months for renovations.

Due to overcapacity and rising passenger demand, the government decided to build a new terminal. Planning for a new terminal has been under consideration since 2010, when it was first proposed to construct a two-storey international terminal on a 2,000 m² site. The new facility opened on 6 April 2016, with a floor area of 12,000 m² and a capacity of 1 million passengers annually. The new terminal features 10 check-in counters and is equipped with a modern automatic baggage handling system improving the speed of baggage retrieval. The international terminal was designed with a modern eco-airport concept, incorporating elements of local culture, particularly the Julang Ngapak roof architecture characteristic of West Java. The overall interior design of the new terminal also received special input from then-Mayor of Bandung, Ridwan Kamil, enhancing the airport’s aesthetic appeal as a point of pride for the city. In terms of artistic elements, Angkasa Pura II collaborated with Nyoman Nuarta to display several Indonesian-style sculptures in the international terminal gallery. The terminal’s service facilities were also aligned with Skytrax standards, including the provision of a nursery room, quiet room, free charging stations, free internet and Wi-Fi, as well as facilities for passengers with disabilities. The total investment by Angkasa Pura II for the construction of the new domestic and international terminals, along with supporting facilities, amounted to Rp177 billion, fully funded through the company’s internal cash reserves. With the operation of the new terminals, the capacity of Husein Sastranegara International Airport increased to 3.4 million passengers per year, representing a 466% rise from its previous capacity of 600,000 passengers annually.

In 2010, the runway was upgraded and overlaid to accommodate larger aircraft such as the Airbus A320. Prior to this, the airport could only handle smaller aircraft, including the Boeing 737-300 and ATR 72. The airport currently has a single runway measuring 2,200 × 45 meters, capable of accommodating narrow-body aircraft such as the Boeing 737-800 and Airbus A320. Approaches to the runway are particularly challenging due to the airport’s high elevation, which results in unpredictable weather conditions, as well as the surrounding mountainous terrain. Consequently, airlines such as Garuda Indonesia assign only highly experienced pilots to operate flights to and from the airport. The airport apron currently covers 40,000 m², having been expanded from 34,400 m² between 2017 and 2018.

=== New airport ===
The limited availability of land for expansion—due to the airport’s location in the middle of the city—combined with the steady increase in passenger traffic has led the government to consider building a new airport to replace Husein Sastranegara Airport. The situation is further complicated by the surrounding mountainous terrain, which makes landings hazardous during adverse weather conditions such as fog, as well as the airport’s location in an earthquake-prone area. The airport’s 2,200 × 45 meter runway cannot be extended further, as doing so would require cutting into a mountain. This limitation prevents the airport from accommodating wide-body aircraft such as the Boeing 777. Moreover, as a civil enclave within a military airbase, the airport must share airspace with the Indonesian Air Force. This high level of mixed civilian and military traffic further constrains operations and reduces overall efficiency.

Ultimately, the government decided to build a new airport to serve both Bandung and the wider West Java region in Kertajati, Majalengka Regency. The site was selected due to its distance from mountainous terrain and its relatively lower exposure to flooding and earthquake risks. The development of Kertajati International Airport had been planned since the administration of President Megawati Soekarnoputri. A feasibility study for the airport was completed as early as 2003, followed by the issuance of a location permit in 2005. At the initial stage, the West Java Provincial Government stated its willingness to finance the project through the regional budget (APBD). However, construction was not realized until 2011. Following a review, it became clear that the project required funding from the state budget (APBN). After seven years of delay, construction finally began in 2014 with land clearing and foundation works. The project was subsequently designated as part of the National Strategic Projects (PSN), and from 2015 to 2017, construction was carried out using funding from the Ministry of Transportation. Kertajati International Airport officially commenced operations on 24 May 2018, marked by the landing of the Indonesian presidential aircraft as the first aircraft on its runway.

== Airlines and destinations ==
Airlines	Destinations
Citilink	Balikpapan, Denpasar, Medan, Palembang, Surabaya
Garuda Indonesia	Denpasar
Super Air Jet	Balikpapan (begins 3 December 2026), Batam (begins 16 December 2026), Denpasar, Makassar (begins 5 December 2026), Medan, Padang (begins 16 December 2026), Pekanbaru (begins 4 December 2026), Pontianak (begins 5 December 2026)
Susi Air	Jakarta–Halim Perdanakusuma, Pangandaran, Yogyakarta–Adisucipto

== Statistics ==
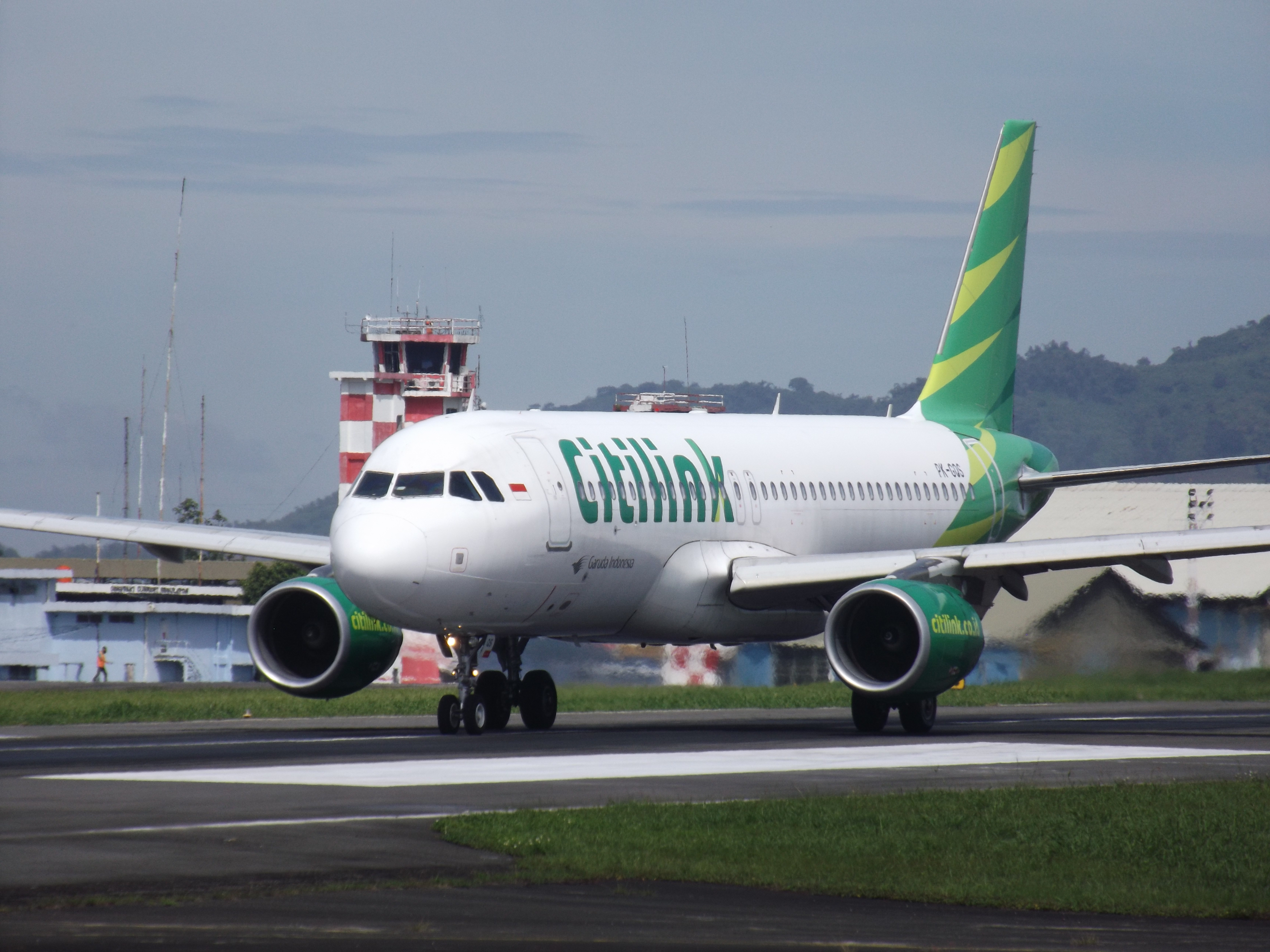
A Citilink Airbus A320-200 taxiing at Husein Sastranegara Airport

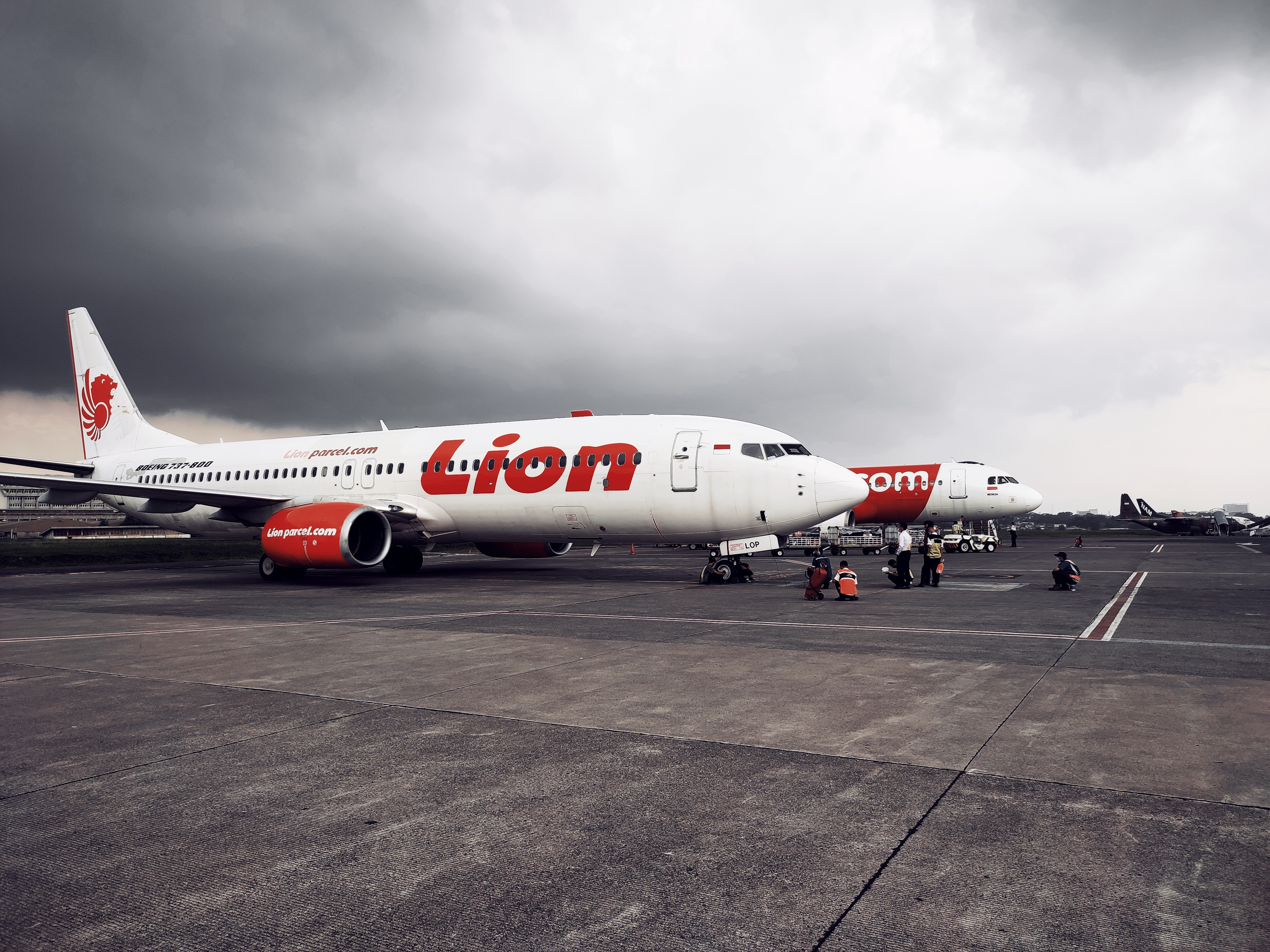
A Lion Air Boeing 737-800 and an Indonesia AirAsia Airbus A320-200 at Husein Sastranegara Airport

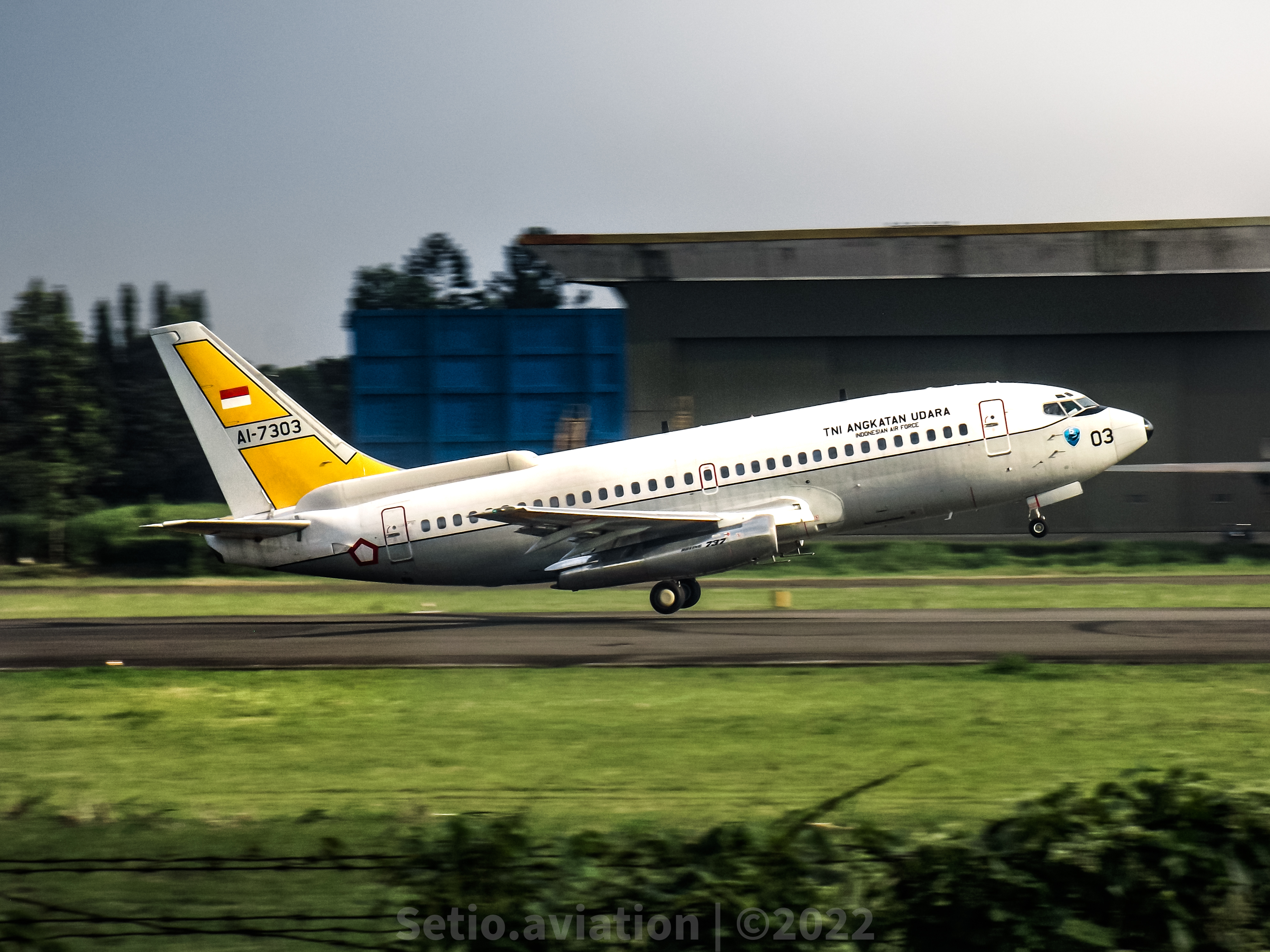
An Indonesian Air Force Boeing 737-200 taking off from Husein Sastranegara Airport

Annual passenger numbers and aircraft statistics
Year	Passengers handled	Passenger % change	Cargo (tonnes)	Cargo % change	Aircraft movements	Aircraft % change
2002	150,125	Steady	276	Steady	9,924	Steady
2003	214,866	▲43.1	353	▲27.9	14,604	▲47.2
2004	366,791	▲70.7	289	▼18.1	14,904	▲2.1
2005	378,419	▲3.2	360	▲24.6	15,603	▲4.7
2006	382,224	▲1.0	315	▼12.5	6,524	▼58.2
2007	360,858	▼5.6	623	▲97.8	6,397	▼1.9
2008	359,260	▼0.4	686	▲10.1	5,911	▼7.6
2009	157,599	▼56.1	1,324	▲93.0	3,437	▼41.9
2010	730,716	▲363.7	772	▼41.7	8,448	▲145.8
2011	937,845	▲28.3	1,039	▲34.6	9,281	▲9.9
2012	1,872,985	▲99.7	2,928	▲181.8	17,534	▲88.9
2013	2,533,887	▲35.3	4,647	▲58.7	19,480	▲11.1
2014	2,927,304	▲15.5	5,855	▲26.0	22,232	▲14.1
2015	3,146,807	▲7.5	7,270	▲24.2	25,902	▲16.5
2016	3,406,936	▲8.3	9,817	▲35.0	26,057	▲0.6
2017	3,537,592	▲3.8	13,775	▲40.3	29,361	▲12.7
2018	3,859,870	▲9.1	19,210	▲39.5	31,865	▲8.5
2019	2,299,647	▼40.4	8,946	▼53.4	24,011	▼24.6
2020	482,295	▼79.0	2,970	▼66.8	9,130	▼62.0
2021	395,887	▼17.9	3,750	▲26.3	5,992	▼34.4
2022	739,297	▲86.7	3,315	▼11.6	6,554	▲9.4
2023	775,814	▲4.9	4,154	▲25.3	6,184	▼5.6
2024	3,532	▼99.5	16	▼99.6	1,895	▼69.4
^{Source: DGCA, Angkasa Pura I}

== Ground transportation ==
The airport is located at the end of Pajajaran Street where taxis are widely available. Some hotels in Bandung provide free airport transfer services and car rental also is available. The airport has carpark facilities which can accommodate hundreds of cars.

== Accidents and incidents ==
- On 17 July 1997, Trigana Air Service Flight 304, operated by a Fokker 27 PK-YPM crashed shortly after takeoff. All 5 crew members and 23 of the 45 passengers on board perished.
- On 6 April 2009, a Fokker F27-400M Troopship of the Indonesian Air Force crashed on landing and hit a hangar belonging to PT Dirgantara Indonesia (Indonesian Aerospace), killing all 24 people on board the F-27 and damaging four other aircraft. This crash is believed to have been caused by a lightning strike.
- On 16 April 2009, Merpati Nusantara Airlines Flight 616, a Boeing 737-300 operating from Bandung to Surabaya and Denpasar, aborted its takeoff after rolling approximately 400 meters (1,310 ft) along the runway and subsequently returned to the apron. No injuries or fatalities were reported.
- On 24 September 2010, a privately owned Super Decathlon (registered PK-NZP) crashed after the pilot attempted an acrobatic maneuver. The pilot, Alexander Supeli, an Indonesian aerospace engineer died several days later.
- On 29 September 2012, FASI AS-202 Bravo crashed and killed both the pilot and copilot after the pilot, Nurman Lubis, attempted an acrobatic maneuver on Bandung Airshow 2012.
