= Cijulang Nusawiru Airport =

Airport serving Pangandaran, West Java, Indonesia

Cijulang Nusawiru Airport Bandar Udara Cijulang Nusawiru
- IATA: CJN; ICAO: WICN

Summary
- Airport type: Public
- Operator: Government of Indonesia
- Serves: Pangandaran
- Location: Cijulang, Pangandaran Regency, West Java, Indonesia
- Time zone: WIB (UTC+07:00)
- Elevation AMSL: 5 m (16 ft)
- Coordinates: 07°43′12″S 108°29′19″E
- Website: www.indonesiaairport.com

Map
- Location of the airport in Java

Runways
Direction	Length		Surface
Direction	m	ft	Surface
07/25	1,400	4,593	Asphalt
- Sources: Airport Guide

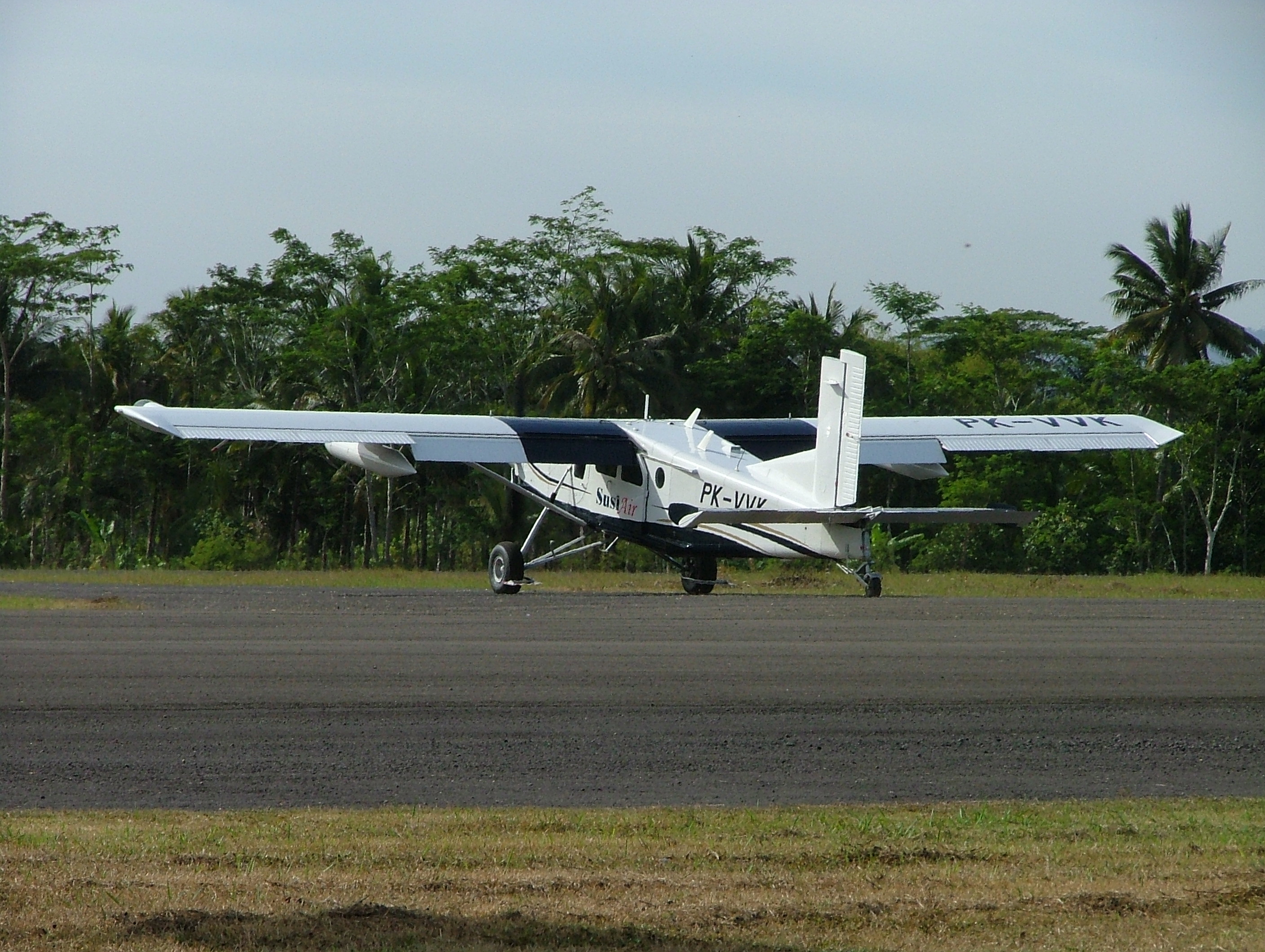
A Pilatus PC-6 Porter from Susi Air at Nusawiru Airport

Cijulang Nusawiru Airport (Indonesian: Bandar Udara Nusawiru) (IATA: CJN, ICAO: WICN), also known as Pangandaran Airport, is an airport near Pangandaran, Pangandaran Regency, a city in the province of West Java on the island of Java in Indonesia.

== Facilities ==
The airport is at an elevation of 16 feet above mean sea level. It has one runway designated 07/25 with an asphalt surface measuring 1,400 m. The airport is operated and managed by UPT Ditjen Hubud, an agency under the Ministry of Transportation, Indonesia.

== Airlines and destinations ==
This airport is mostly used by Susi Air as a main base and maintenance facility.

Airlines	Destinations
Susi Air	Bandung–Husein Sastranegara, Jakarta–Halim Perdanakusuma (Note: Jakarta–Halim Perdanakusuma is continuation of Bandung–Husein Sastranegara flight as same flight number)
