= Pangandaran =

Indonesian town and district

Coordinates: 7.6969°S 108.6568°E

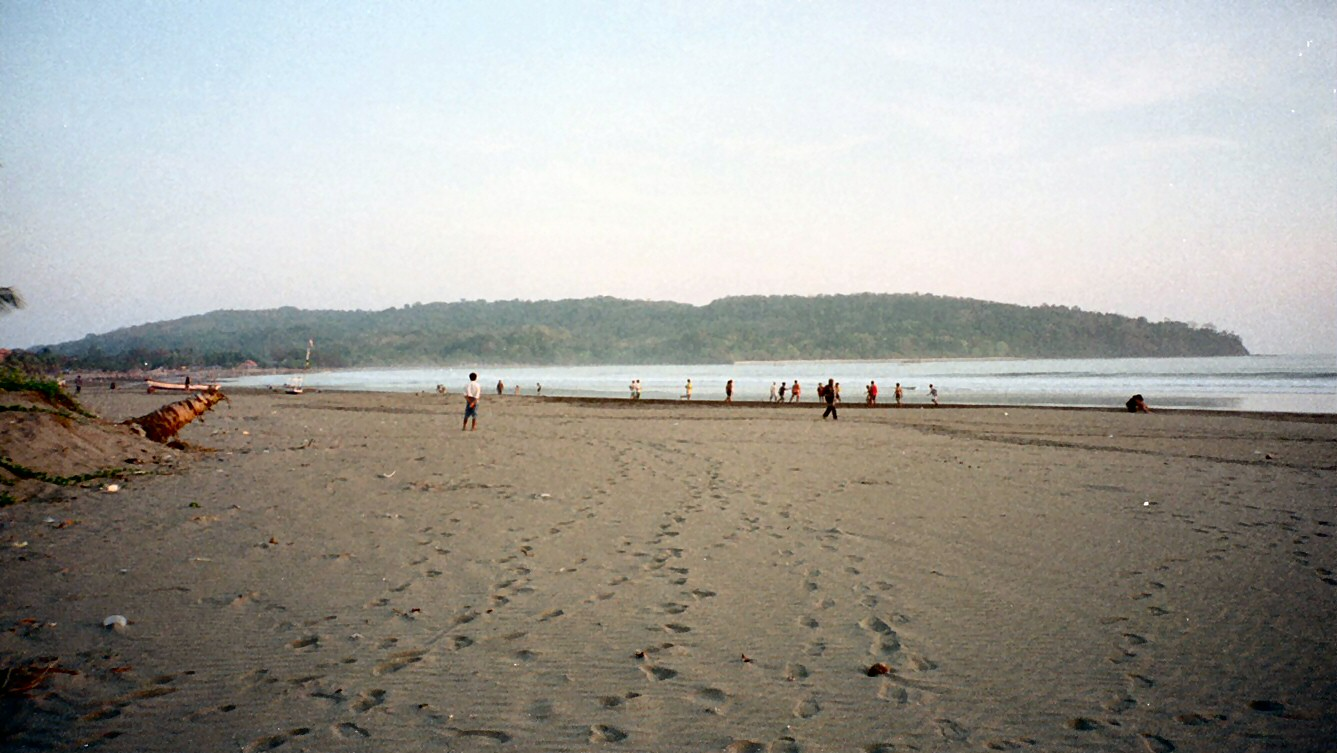
The beach of Pangandaran with its peninsula

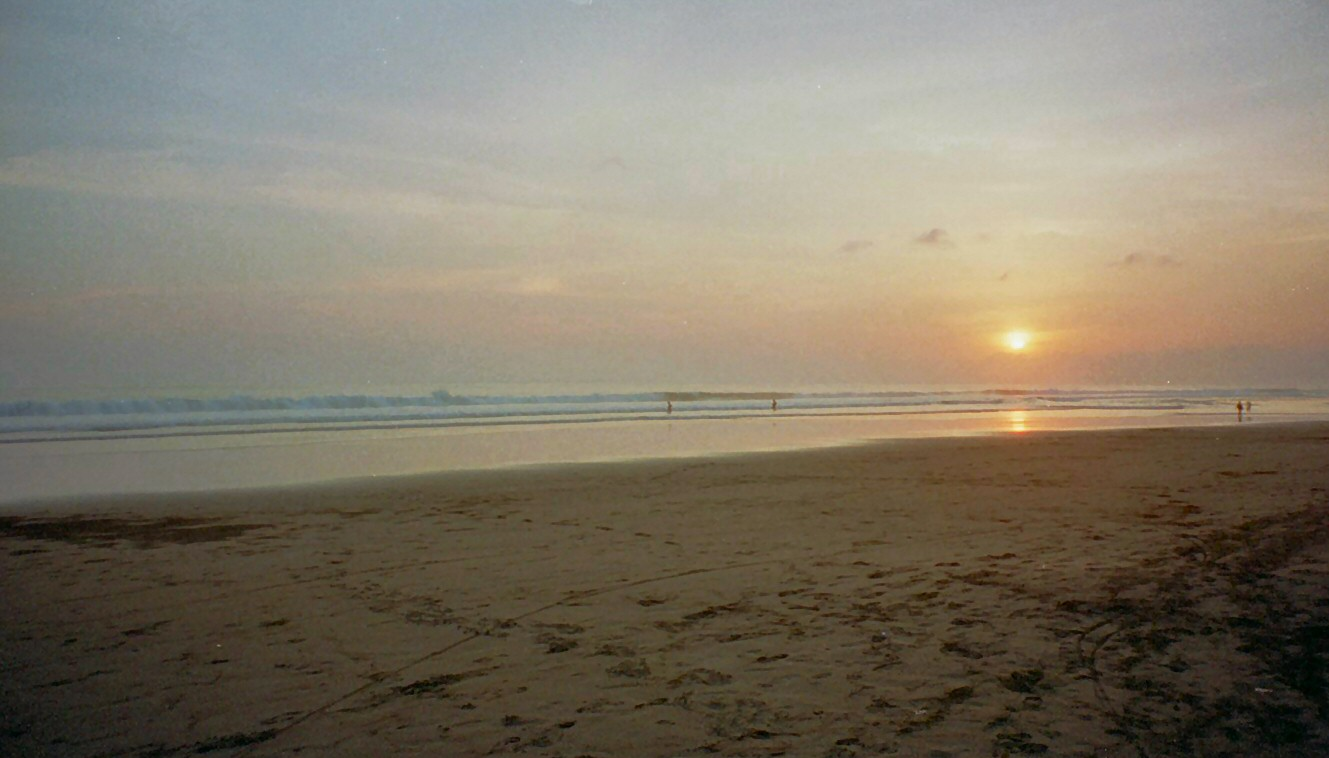
Sunset at Pangandaran beach.

Pangandaran is a town and district of Pangandaran Regency within the province of West Java, Indonesia. It is located on the southern coast of the island of Java. A well-known surfing beach has made Pangandaran a popular tourist destination.

== History ==
On 17 July 2006, an undersea earthquake measuring 7.7 on the moment magnitude scale triggered a tsunami that engulfed the resort area and caused destruction as far inland as half a kilometre. Over three hundred people from the town were killed.

== Tourism ==
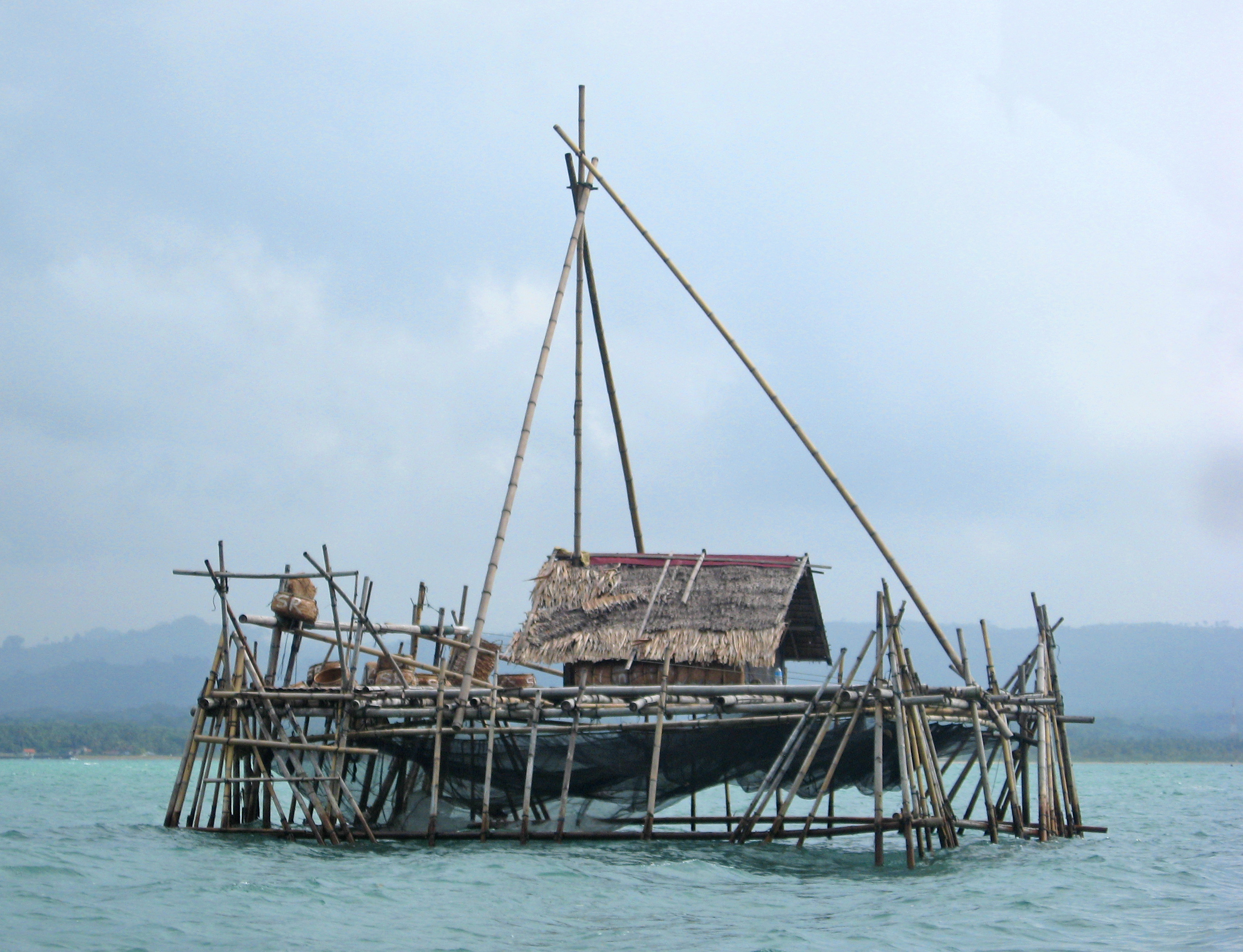
A fishing hut near Pangandaran

Pangandaran is a large fishing village situated on a narrow isthmus with Pangandaran National Park occupying the entire headland.

On either side to the east and to the west of Pangandaran village and the National Park isthmus are two beaches of volcanic black sand.

The Penanjung Pangandaran nature reserve is nearby on a peninsula connected to the mainland by a narrow neck of land. The isthmus is around 200 m wide. About eighty percent of the nature reserve is secondary rainforest. The flora of the nature reserve includes the Rafflesia.

The Pangandaran International Kite Festival has been held since 1985.

== Transportation ==
Cijulang Nusawiru Airport is located nearby and provides facilities for domestic service to Jakarta.

== Climate ==
Pangandaran has a tropical rainforest climate (Af) with heavy to very heavy rainfall year-round.

Climate data for Pangandaran
Month	Jan	Feb	Mar	Apr	May	Jun	Jul	Aug	Sep	Oct	Nov	Dec	Year
Mean daily maximum °C (°F)	31.0 (87.8)	31.4 (88.5)	31.4 (88.5)	31.3 (88.3)	31.1 (88.0)	30.4 (86.7)	29.2 (84.6)	29.3 (84.7)	29.8 (85.6)	30.5 (86.9)	30.6 (87.1)	31.0 (87.8)	30.6 (87.0)
Daily mean °C (°F)	27.2 (81.0)	27.3 (81.1)	27.5 (81.5)	27.4 (81.3)	27.2 (81.0)	26.5 (79.7)	25.7 (78.3)	25.6 (78.1)	26.1 (79.0)	26.7 (80.1)	27.0 (80.6)	27.3 (81.1)	26.8 (80.2)
Mean daily minimum °C (°F)	23.5 (74.3)	23.3 (73.9)	23.6 (74.5)	23.6 (74.5)	23.4 (74.1)	22.6 (72.7)	22.2 (72.0)	21.9 (71.4)	22.4 (72.3)	23.0 (73.4)	23.5 (74.3)	23.6 (74.5)	23.1 (73.5)
Average rainfall mm (inches)	236 (9.3)	219 (8.6)	248 (9.8)	282 (11.1)	318 (12.5)	297 (11.7)	246 (9.7)	182 (7.2)	177 (7.0)	416 (16.4)	409 (16.1)	292 (11.5)	3,322 (130.9)
Source: Climate-Data.org
