= Xpress Air =

Indonesian airline

IATA	ICAO	Call sign
XN	XAR	XPRESS
- Founded: 2003
- Ceased operations: 2021
- Hubs: Tanjung Pinang - Raja Haji Fisabilillah International Airport (main hub)
- Fleet size: 6
- Destinations: 23
- Headquarters: Indonesia
- Website: www.xpressair.co.id

Xpress Air was an Indonesian domestic regular airline that offered direct flights to the eastern parts of Indonesia, with its first flight in 2005, and from 2014 international routes to Malaysia. Beginning with two Boeing 737s, Xpress Air was the first privately owned, scheduled airline to connect Jakarta to 24 domestic destinations like Makassar (formerly known as Ujung Pandang), Ternate, Sorong, Manokwari and Jayapura. Makassar was a main hub for all flights coming from Java to the eastern cities of Indonesia, while Sorong was a second hub in Papua, connecting remote places surrounding the West Papua area. The airline ceased all operations in 2021.

== History ==
Express Air began commercial operations between Jayapura and Jakarta on June 23, 2003. The airline had grown to become one of the major airlines in eastern Indonesia. Xpress Air was done several major fleet expansion to serve more destinations along West-East Papua axis, Sulawesi, Maluku and Nusa Tenggara region. The vision to also offer routes to the western regions has been met as Xpress Air has connecting people to Yogyakarta, Surabaya, Pontianak and more.

In 2012, Xpress Air adopted a new branding name (from Express Air to Xpress Air to represent a more modern and customer-friendly airline), a new strategy, and a new slogan, "Terbanglah Indonesia", maintaining the culture and tradition of a friendly airline with new, modern advancements and motivation.

In 2021 the airline ceased all operations.

== Destinations ==
=== Destinations at time of closure ===
- Indonesia
  - Balikpapan - Sepinggan International Airport
  - Bandar Lampung - Radin Inten II International Airport
  - Banjarbaru - Syamsudin Noor International Airport
  - Banyuwangi - Banyuwangi International Airport
  - Batam - Hang Nadim International Airport
  - Berau - Berau Airport
  - Dabo - Dabo Airport
  - Fakfak - Fakfak Torea Airport
  - Sentani - Sentani International Airport
  - Matak - Matak Airport
  - Malinau - Robert Atty Bessing Airport
  - Manokwari - Rendani Airport
  - Nunukan - Nunukan Airport
  - Palembang - Sultan Mahmud Badaruddin II Airport
  - Pangkalan Bun - Iskandar Airport
  - Pontianak - Supadio International Airport
  - Ranai - Ranai Airport
  - Samarinda - Samarinda International Airport
  - Semarang - Ahmad Yani International Airport
  - Surakarta - Adisumarmo International Airport
  - Tanjung Pinang - Raja Haji Fisabilillah Airport - hub
  - Yogyakarta - Adisutjipto International Airport

=== Terminated destinations before closure ===
- Indonesia
  - Bandung - Husein Sastranegara International Airport
  - Jakarta - Soekarno Hatta International Airport
  - Makassar - Sultan Hasanuddin International Airport
  - Padang - Minangkabau International Airport
  - Pekanbaru - Sultan Syarif Kasim II International Airport
  - Sleman - Adisucipto International Airport
  Malaysia
  - Johor Bahru - Senai International Airport
  - Kuching - Kuching International Airport
  - Melaka - Melaka International Airport
  - Miri - Miri International Airport

== Fleet ==
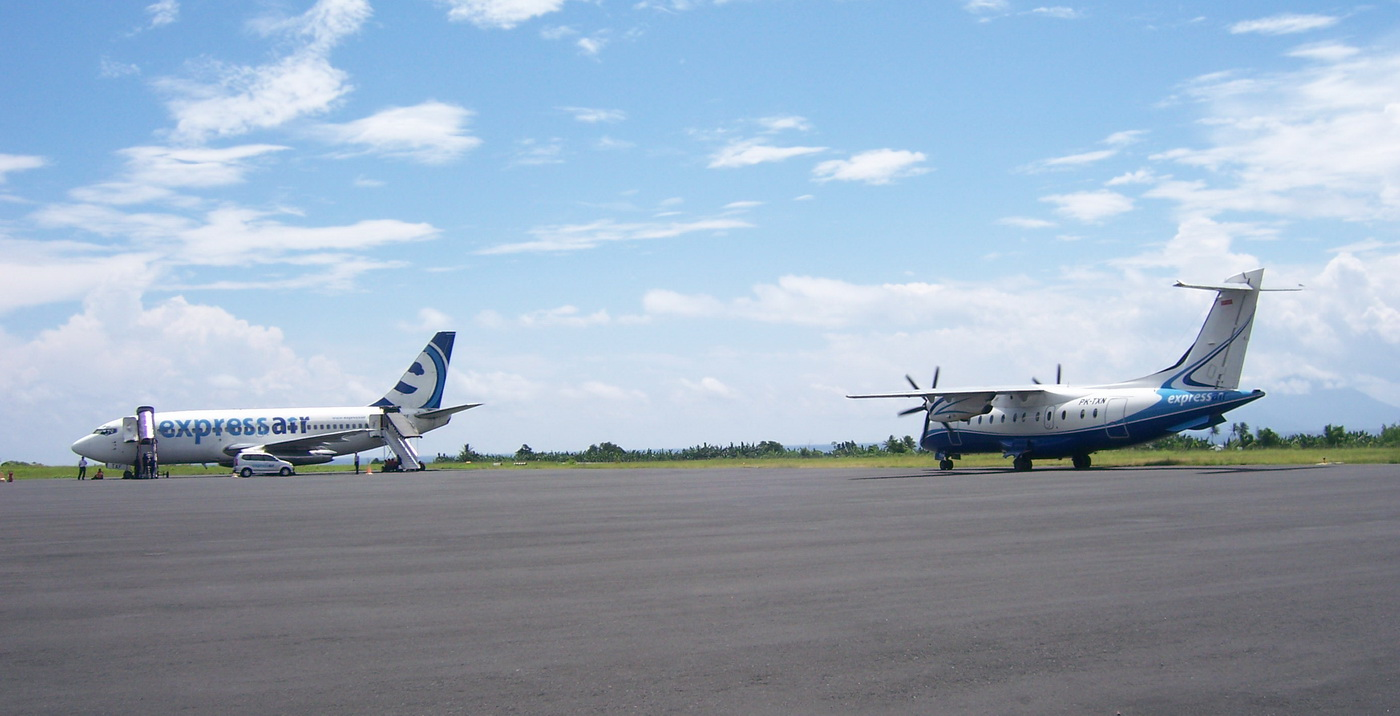
Xpress Air planes at Sultan Babullah Airport

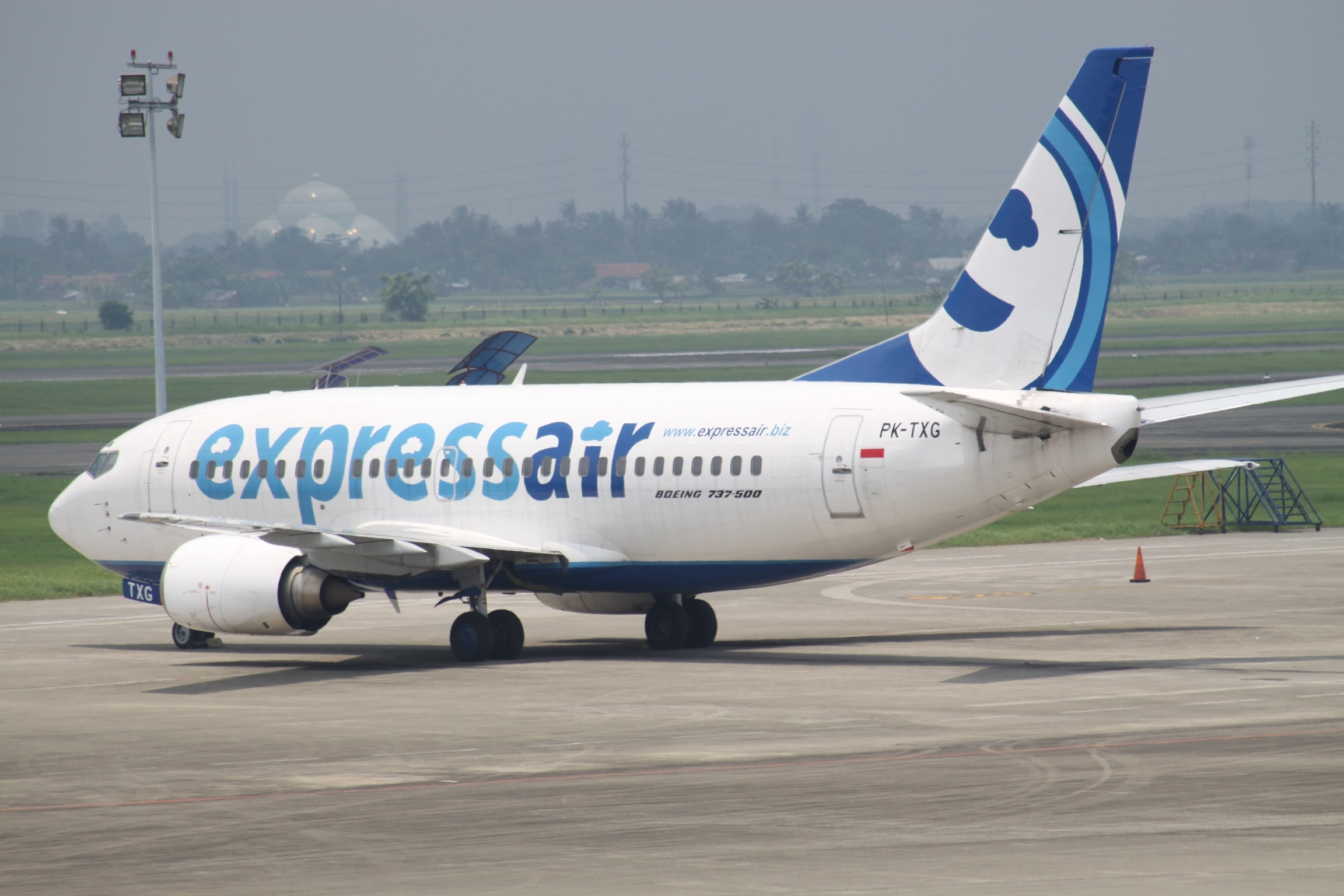
Boeing 737-500 (PK-TXG) at Jakarta Airport

=== Last active fleet ===
As of early 2021 the Xpress Air fleet consisted of the following aircraft:

Xpress Air fleet
Aircraft	In fleet	Order	Passengers	Notes
ATR 42-300	2	—	42	
Boeing 737-300	1	—	149	
Dornier 328-110	3	—	32	
Total	6	—		

=== Retired fleet before closure ===
The airline previously operated the following aircraft:

- 5 Boeing 737-200 (one preserved in Museum Angkut, Batu)
- 6 Dornier 328
- 1 Dornier 328JET
- 1 Boeing 737-500

== Incidents ==
- On 6 November 2008, a Dornier 328 that was in service for only six weeks with Express Air had a hard landing at Fakfak Airport. All 36 passengers and crew survived.
- On June 14, 2009, an Express Air Dornier 328 swerved off the runway at Tanahmerah Airport and skidded into an earthen mound. This resulted in substantial damage to the right engine and propeller.
- On 13 May 2013, an Express Air Boeing 737-200 experienced a technical engine problem. The aircraft later landed at Jayapura safely.
