= Sky Aviation (Indonesia) =

Regional airline based in Indonesia

IATA	ICAO	Call sign
SY	SYA	SKY NUSANTARA
- Founded: 2010
- Ceased operations: 2014 (suspended)
- Hubs: Hang Nadim Airport; Sultan Syarif Kasim II Airport
- Secondary hubs: Soekarno-Hatta International Airport; Halim Perdanakusuma Airport; Depati Amir Airport; Sultan Mahmud Badaruddin II Airport; Juanda International Airport; Buluh Tumbang Airport; Raja Haji Fisabilillah Airport
- Fleet size: 12
- Destinations: 21
- Headquarters: Jakarta, Indonesia
- Website: www.sky-aviation.co.id

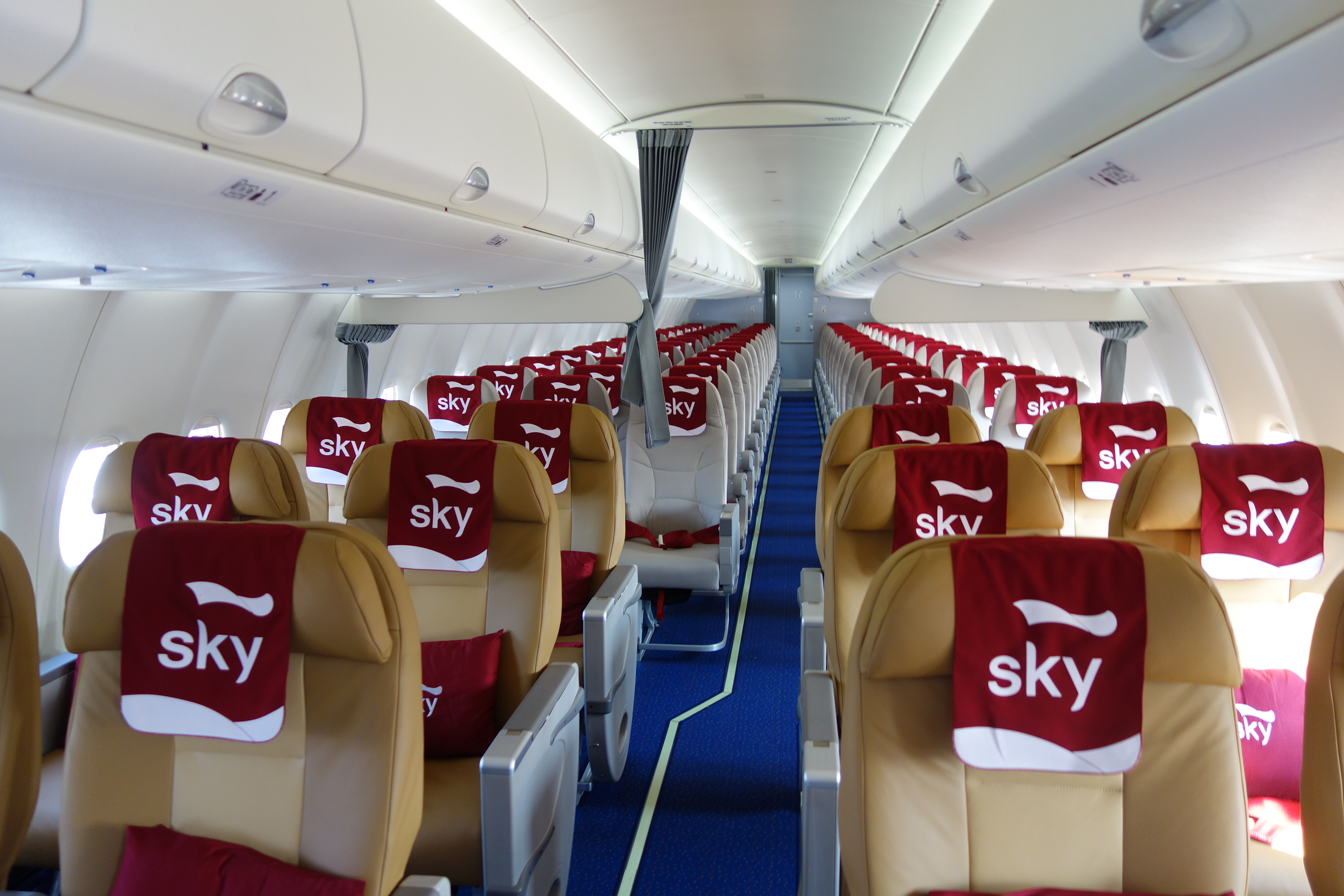
A view of cabin of the Sukhoi Superjet 100

Sky Aviation was a regional airline based in Jakarta, Indonesia. It started service in 2010 and suspended operation in 2014.

== History ==
Sky Aviation was established as an air charter service in 2010 with a fleet of two Cirrus aircraft. After a management change in 2010, it expanded its services to a regular scheduled airline.

In 2010 Sky Aviation acquired a Cessna Grand Caravan to service scheduled flights between Surabaya, Banyuwangi and Denpasar. These routes were officially launched in Banyuwangi on December 29, 2010.

In the first quarter of 2011 Sky Aviation acquired Fokker 50 turbo props as new type of fleet. Three Fokker 50 aircraft joined its fleet and entered into service.

On March 29, 2012 Sky Aviation launched its first international route with a turboprop-powered Fokker F-50 airplane to serve Raja Haji Fisabilillah Airport, Tanjung Pinang, Riau Islands to Melaka (Malacca), Malaysia.

On August 7, 2012, Sky Aviation commenced Boeing 737-300 services flying scheduled flights between Jakarta and Pekanbaru. . The airline also began providing full meal-service aboard its aircraft in collaboration with BreadTalk.

The airline took delivery of the first of 12 Sukhoi Superjet 100 it had ordered, making it the first airline in Indonesia to operate the type.

On March 19, 2014 the Indonesian Transportation and Communication Ministry Tifatul Sembiring confirmed that Sky Aviation would be temporarily suspending its operations effective immediately. The company was reportedly seeking a cash injection from new investors, with a plan to resume operations by March 31, 2014. Sky Aviation requested a third extension of their temporary suspension, but as regulations permitted only two, the Transportation Ministry allocated its routes to other airlines beginning 5 May 2014. On July 22, 2014, it was announced that Sky Aviation was due to resume services after all negotiations had been settled, but as of May 2017, the company remained suspended, and the airline fleet was still in storage.

== Destinations ==
=== Indonesia ===
==== Java ====
- Surabaya, Juanda International Airport

==== Sumatra ====
- Batam, Hang Nadim Airport, hub
- Pekanbaru, Sultan Syarif Kasim II Airport, hub
- Dumai, Pinang Kampai Airport
- Matak, Matak Airport
- Tanjung Pinang, Raja Haji Fisabilillah Airport
- Natuna, Ranai Airport
- Palembang, Sultan Mahmud Badaruddin II International Airport
- Tanjung Pandan, H.A.S. Hanandjoeddin Airport
- Pangkal Pinang, Depati Amir Airport
- Siborong-Borong, Silangit Airport
- Sibolga, Ferdinand Lumban Tobing Airport
- Gunung Sitoli, Binaka Airport
- Bandar Lampung, Radin Inten II Airport
- Kota Medan, Bandara Polonia

==== Kalimantan ====
- Pontianak, Supadio Airport

==== Sulawesi ====
- Makassar, Sultan Hasanuddin International Airport

==== Bali and Nusa Tenggara ====
- Bali, Ngurah Rai International Airport
- Lombok, Lombok International Airport
- Labuan Bajo, Komodo Airport
- Ende, H. Hasan Aroeboesman Airport
- Kupang, El Tari Airport

==== Papua ====
- Sorong, Sorong Airport
- Jayapura, Sentani Airport

=== Malaysia ===
- Malacca, Malacca International Airport

== Fleet ==
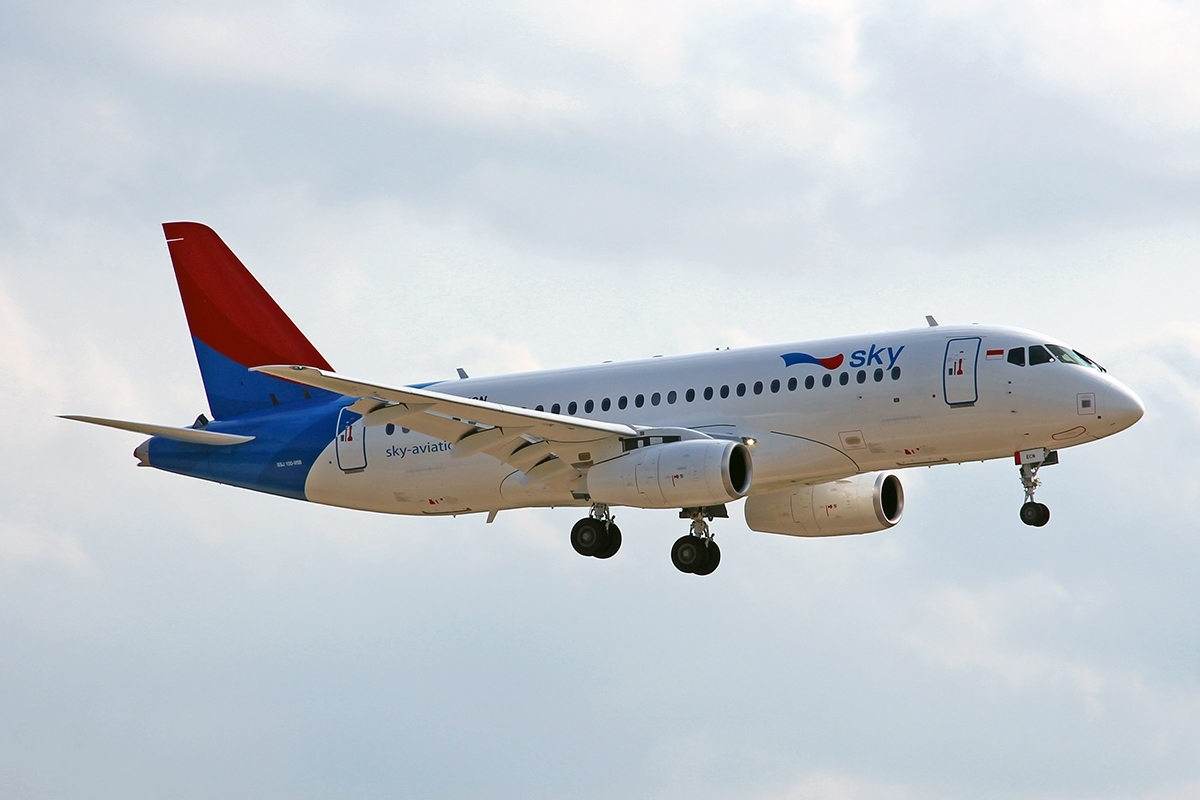
Sky Aviation Sukhoi Superjet 100

As of December 2013, the Sky Aviation fleet includes the following aircraft:

Aircraft	In fleet	Orders	Passengers	Stored	Notes
Cirrus SR-20	1	0	3	0	
Cirrus SR-22	1	0	3	0	
Cessna Grand Caravan	1	0	9	0	
Fokker 50	5	0	50	0	
Sukhoi Superjet 100	0	9	12+75	3	3 planes were delivered; rest of order was cancelled.
Total	11	9	261	3	

The Sky Aviation fleet is currently in storage pending resumption of operations.

== Accidents and incidents ==
On August 27, 2012, a Fokker 50 registration PK-ECD performing flight SYA350 from Tanjungpinang to Natuna (Indonesia) with 44 people on board overran the end of runway 18 while landing in Natuna during heavy rain and reduced visibility conditions at about 11:15L (04:15Z). The aircraft came to a stop with all gear on soft ground with the main gear a few meters past the paved surface. There were no injuries on board, and the aircraft sustained only minor damage.
