= TNJ =

TNJ or tnj may also refer to:

- Transport of New Jersey
- IATA code for Raja Haji Fisabilillah International Airport
