= K. H. Yusuf Muhammad =

Indonesian politician

K.H. Yusuf Muhammad (also known as Gus Yus; 23 February 1942 – 30 November 2004) was an Indonesian politician.

== Biography ==
In the first election for the National Awakening Party (PKB), Muhammad was elected as a member of the Republic of Indonesia Parliament in Jember Regency and was active in Commission II, in charge of domestic law. He was also active in the Ad-Hoc I committee, amendments to the 1945 Constitution, the Special Committee to form the Babylonian and Gorontalo Provinces and was intense in making laws. These tasks are part of his commitment as a member of the People's Representative Council of the Republic of Indonesia (DPR-RI.

As the FPKB Chair of the People's Consultative Assembly (MPR-RI), Yus had the following three central roles:

1. PKB winner in the 3rd 1999 election determines the course of national politics.
2. As President Gusdur's main supporter in guarding Gusdur policy in the MPR.
3. The role of FPKB determines the direction and color of the 1945 Constitution amendment process.

Muhammad said that the amendment process was mainly people's sovereignty, check and balance and low enforcement.

During the 2004 Election, Yus was re-elected as a member of the FPKB RI DPR, becoming chairman of Commission VIII in charge of religion, social affairs and women's empowerment. Some people named Muhammad as an "Islamic boarding school ambassador for Senayan". As well as jokingly calling Commission VIII a "hereafter commission". Even though he was busy as a member of the Indonesian House of Representatives, Muhammad also managed several boarding schools, teaching yellow books and holding public lectures.

== Death ==
Muhammad was killed in the crash of Lion Air Flight 538 in Surakarta on 30 November 2004.
