= Lion Air =

Low-cost airline of Indonesia

PT Lion Mentari Airlines

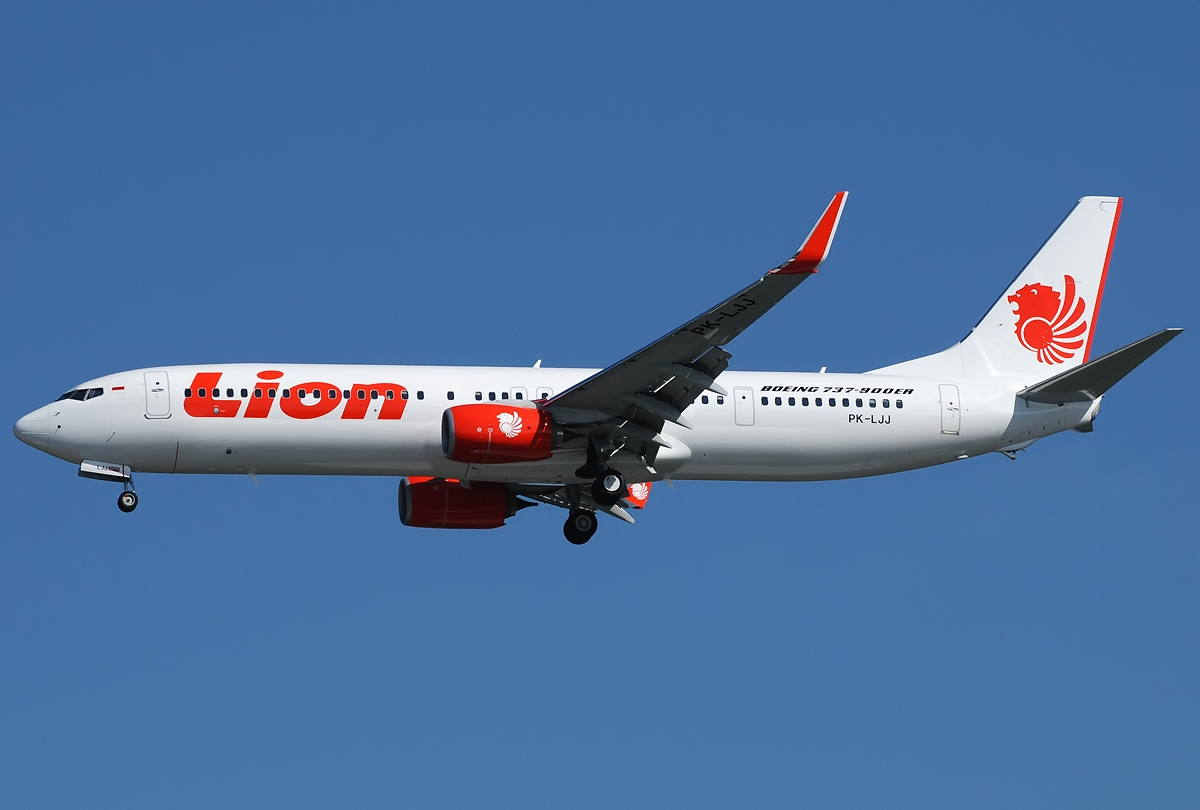
- A Lion Air Boeing 737-900ER
IATA	ICAO	Call sign
JT	LNI	LION INTER
- Founded: 15 November 1999; 26 years ago
- Commenced operations: 30 June 2000; 26 years ago
- Hubs: Jakarta–Soekarno-Hatta; Makassar; Surabaya
- Secondary hubs: Denpasar; Medan
- Focus cities: Batam
- Fleet size: 99
- Destinations: 47
- Parent company: Lion Air Group
- Headquarters: Lion Air Tower, Jalan KH. Hasyim Ashari, Jakarta, Indonesia
- Key people: Rusdi Kirana (Founder & Chairman); Kusnan Kirana (Founder & President Commissioner); Rudy Lumingkewas (President Director)
- Website: www.lionair.co.id/en/home

Lion Air is an Indonesian low-cost airline based in Jakarta. Part of Lion Air Group, it is the country’s largest privately owned airline and the second-largest low-cost airline in Southeast Asia (after AirAsia). The airline operates both domestic and international routes, connecting destinations in Indonesia with Singapore, Malaysia and Saudi Arabia, as well as charter routes to mainland China, Hong Kong, South Korea and Macau, with more than 630 flights per day.

The airline has repeatedly broken records for largest aircraft orders, such as its $24 billion order for 234 Airbus A320 jets. The airline's 2011 order of 230 Boeing 737 for $21.7 billion was the largest aircraft order received by Boeing at the time, and the agreement signing was witnessed by President of the United States, Barack Obama.

The airline signed an agreement with US-based aircraft manufacturer Boeing for fifty 737 MAX 10 passenger jets worth $6.24 billion in June 2017. The airline is Boeing's second-largest customer (after US-based Southwest Airlines). It had once been criticised for poor operational management in areas such as scheduling and safety, although steps have been taken to improve its safety: on 16 June 2016, the European Union lifted the ban it had placed on Lion Air from flying into European airspace. In June 2018 it attained a positive safety rating following an ICAO audit.

== History ==
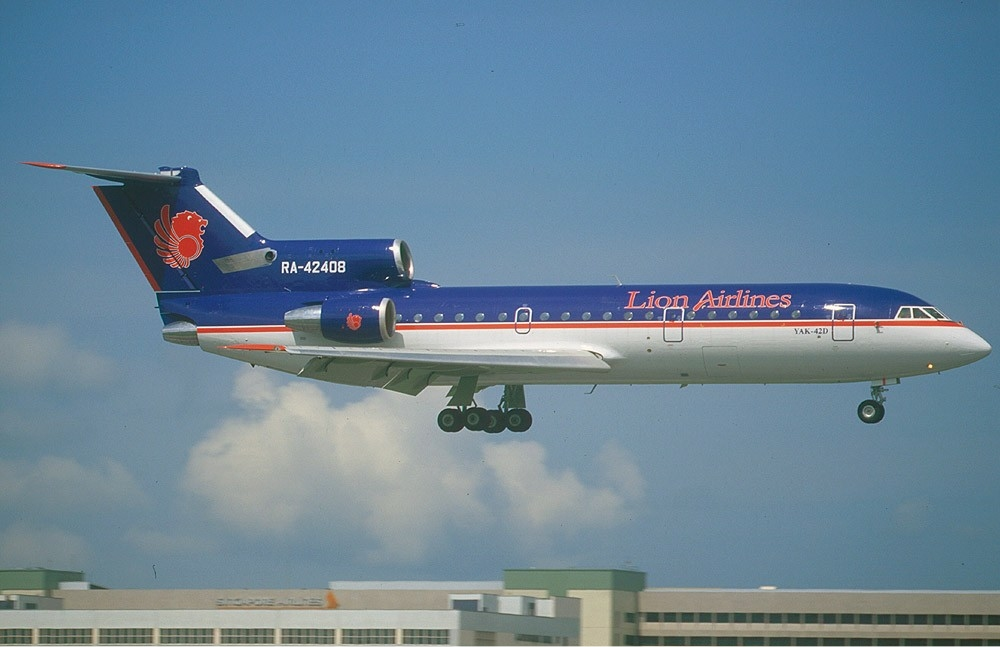
A Yakovlev Yak-42D, the first aircraft of Lion Air, landing in Singapore

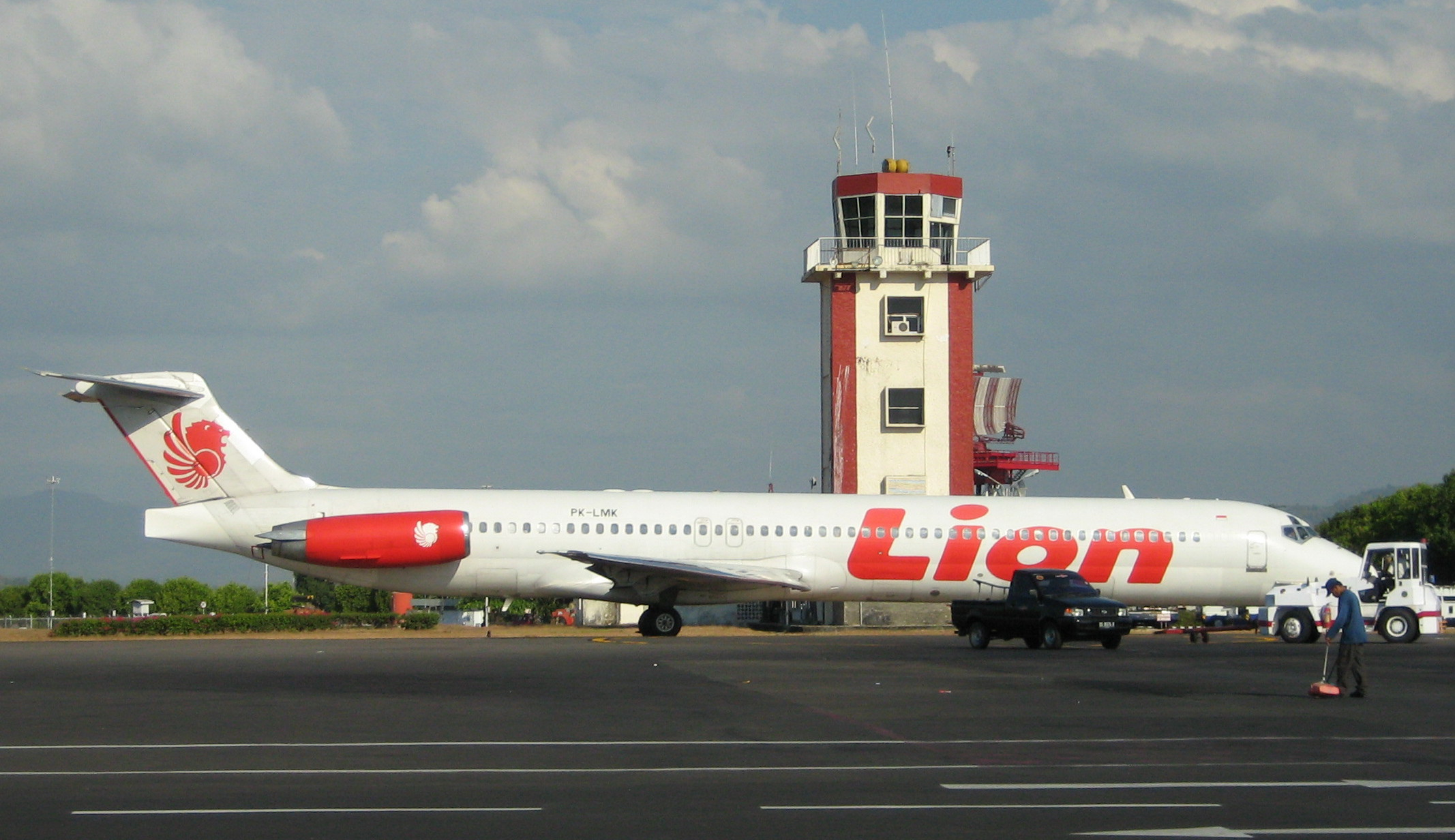
A Lion Air McDonnell Douglas MD-82 at Sultan Hasanuddin International Airport

The airline was established in October 1999 by Rusdi and Kusnan Kirana and started operations on 30 June 2000, when it began scheduled passenger services from Jakarta to Denpasar and Pontianak using a leased Boeing 737-200. It was the first low-cost airline in Indonesia. The fleet was quickly expanded with the wet-lease of five Yakovlev Yak-42Ds, two McDonnell Douglas MD-82s and two sub-leased Airbus A310-300s. Rapid growth enabled modernisation of the fleet with Boeing 737-300 and Boeing 737-400 aircraft. In 2003, a subsidiary airline was established, Wings Air, operating flights on lower density routes. Further subsidiaries were developed including Malindo Air in Malaysia in 2012, Thai Lion Air in Thailand in 2013 and domestically, Batik Air, a full-service subsidiary, also in 2013.

The airline is planning to join the International Air Transport Association (IATA) and therefore hoping to become the second IATA Indonesian member carrier after Garuda Indonesia. Lion Air failed, in early 2011, the initial IATA assessments for membership due to safety concerns. Lion Air and Boeing pioneered the use of required navigation performance (RNP) procedures in Indonesia, having successfully performed validation flights at the two terrain-challenged airports of Ambon and Manado.

From 19 July 2011, Lion Air grounded 13 aircraft due to sanctions caused by bad on-time performance (OTP). The transportation ministry recorded that Lion Air's OTP of 66.45 percent was the worst of six airlines in an assessment conducted from January to April 2011 at 24 airports nationwide. On the other hand, airlines using Jakarta airport faced considerable delays to their schedules due to runway congestion.

On 18 November 2011, the airline jointly announced with Boeing a record-setting order of 201 Boeing 737 MAX and 29 Boeing 737-900ER aircraft, setting the record for the world's biggest single order of 230 aircraft for a commercial airline worth $21.7 billion.

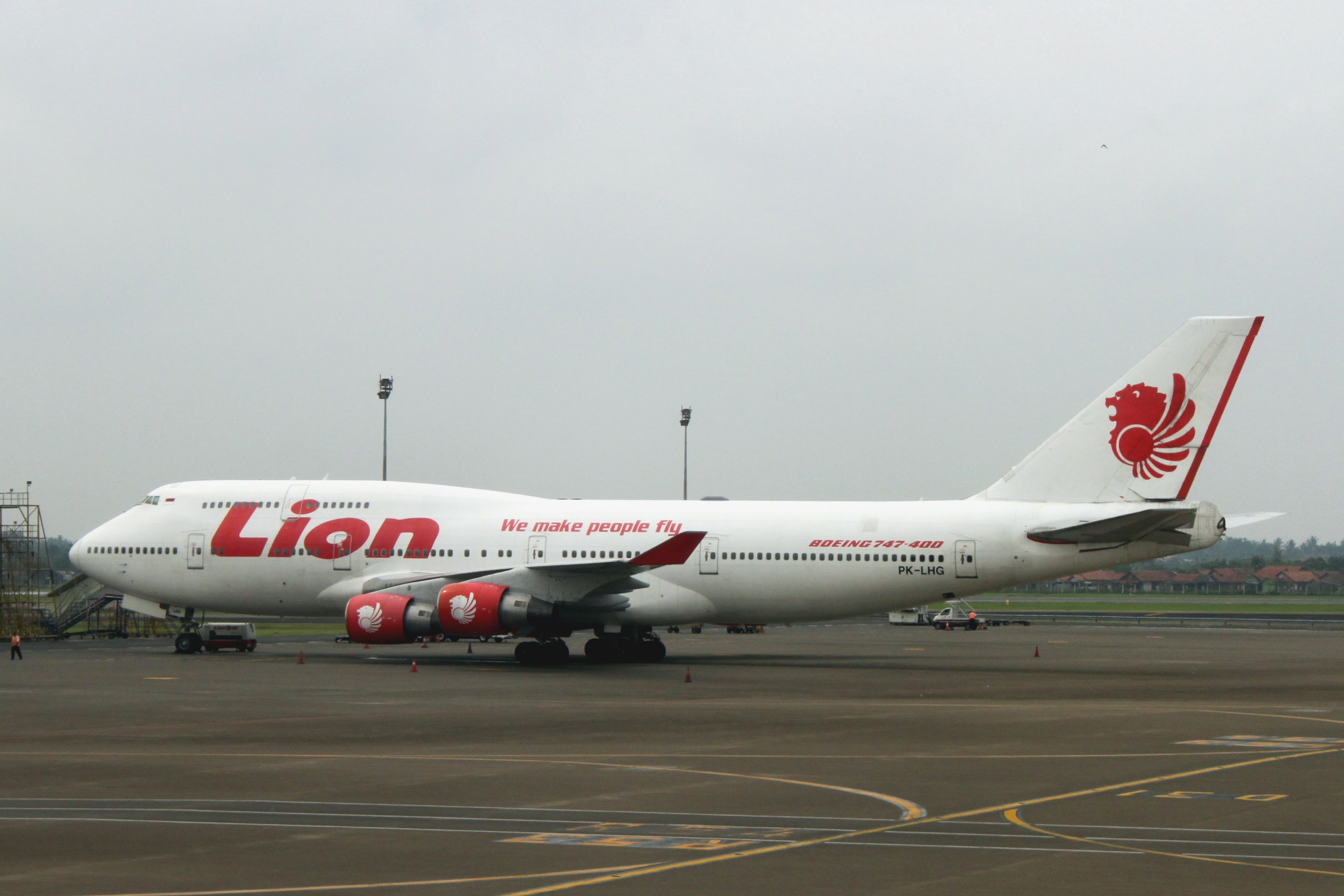
A Lion Air Boeing 747-400 at Soekarno–Hatta International Airport

In January 2012, the Transportation Ministry said that it had sanctioned Lion Air because some of its pilots and crew members were found in recent months to be in possession of crystal methamphetamine. In late 2011, Muhammad Nasri and two other co-pilots were arrested at a party in Tangerang; in early 2012 a pilot was caught with crystal meth in Makassar. On 4 February 2012, another Lion Air pilot was arrested following a positive urinalysis test for use of methamphetamine; he was scheduled to fly the Surabaya-Makassar-Balikpapan-Surabaya flight hours later. The licenses of the pilots and crew were revoked.

On 18 March 2013, Lion Air signed a contract to purchase 234 Airbus aircraft worth US$24 billion in France and witnessed directly by French President François Hollande. The ordered aircraft are types of A320 and A321.

Lion Air established a full service airline with the name Batik Air, which started operating in 2013 using 737-900ER. Lion Air also signed a commitment with Boeing to order five Boeing 787 Dreamliner for this airline, and this made Lion Air the first Indonesian airline to order this type since Garuda Indonesia canceled its order for the 10 Dreamliners in 2010, and is expected to be sent in 2015. The airline has also considered ordering wide-body aircraft Airbus A330, but chose to buy 787's.

On 31 July 2015, Lion Air officially left INACA due to a mismatch with other members.

In June 2016, Lion Group was removed from the list of blacklisted airlines to fly into the EU.

In September 2019, Lion Air confirmed that personal data of around 35 million customers had been leaked, including passport details, home addresses, and phone numbers.

During the COVID-19 pandemic in Indonesia, Lion Group suspended operations until 1 June. It suspended operations again on 5 June after finding few passengers could provide documents proving they were virus-free and have a business reason or family emergency requiring travel. In July 2020, Lion Group announced that the airline will lay off 2,600 contract workers as demand continues to sharply decline.

Lion Air’s loyalty scheme is centered on CabinClub, a platform-driven rewards program that emphasizes booking activity and transactional benefits rather than conventional frequent flyer miles or tier status.

== Destinations ==
As of June 2025, Lion Air flies (or has flown) to the following destinations:

Country	City	Airport	Notes	Ref
Indonesia	Ambon	Pattimura Airport		
Indonesia	Balikpapan	Sultan Aji Muhammad Sulaiman Sepinggan Airport		
Indonesia	Bandar Lampung	Radin Inten II International Airport		
Indonesia	Banda Aceh	Sultan Iskandar Muda International Airport	Terminated	
Indonesia	Bandung	Husein Sastranegara Airport	Terminated	
Indonesia	Bandung	Kertajati International Airport	Terminated	
Indonesia	Banjarmasin	Syamsudin Noor International Airport		
Indonesia	Banyuwangi	Banyuwangi Airport	Terminated	
Indonesia	Batam	Hang Nadim International Airport	Base	
Indonesia	Bengkulu	Fatmawati Soekarno Airport		
Indonesia	Berau	Kalimarau Airport	Terminated	
Indonesia	Biak	Biak Airport		
Indonesia	Denpasar	Ngurah Rai International Airport	Base	
Indonesia	Gorontalo	Djalaluddin Airport		
Indonesia	Jakarta	Soekarno–Hatta International Airport	Base	
Indonesia	Jambi	Sultan Thaha Airport		
Indonesia	Jayapura	Sentani International Airport		
Indonesia	Kendari	Haluoleo Airport		
Indonesia	Kupang	El Tari Airport		
Indonesia	Labuan Bajo	Komodo International Airport	Terminated	
Indonesia	Langgur	Karel Sadsuitubun Airport		
Indonesia	Makassar	Sultan Hasanuddin International Airport	Base	
Indonesia	Malang	Abdul Rachman Saleh Airport	Terminated	
Indonesia	Manado	Sam Ratulangi International Airport	Base	
Indonesia	Manokwari	Rendani Airport		
Indonesia	Mataram	Lombok International Airport		
Indonesia	Medan	Kualanamu International Airport	Base	
Indonesia	Merauke	Mopah Airport		
Indonesia	Padang	Minangkabau International Airport		
Indonesia	Palangkaraya	Tjilik Riwut Airport		
Indonesia	Palembang	Sultan Mahmud Badaruddin II International Airport	Base	
Indonesia	Palu	Mutiara SIS Al-Jufrie Airport		
Indonesia	Pangkal Pinang	Depati Amir Airport		
Indonesia	Pekanbaru	Sultan Syarif Kasim II International Airport		
Indonesia	Pontianak	Supadio International Airport		
Indonesia	Samarinda	Aji Pangeran Tumenggung Pranoto International Airport	Terminated	
Indonesia	Semarang	Jenderal Ahmad Yani International Airport		
Indonesia	Sorong	Domine Eduard Osok Airport		
Indonesia	Surabaya	Juanda International Airport	Base	
Indonesia	Surakarta	Adisoemarmo International Airport		
Indonesia	Tanjung Pandan	H.A.S. Hanandjoeddin International Airport		
Indonesia	Tanjung Pinang	Raja Haji Fisabilillah Airport	Terminated	
Indonesia	Tarakan	Juwata Airport		
Indonesia	Ternate	Sultan Babullah Airport		
Indonesia	Timika	Mozes Kilangin Airport		
Indonesia	Yogyakarta	Adisutjipto Airport	Terminated	
Indonesia	Yogyakarta	Yogyakarta International Airport	Base	
Malaysia	Kuala Lumpur	Kuala Lumpur International Airport		
Malaysia	Penang	Penang International Airport		
Singapore	Singapore	Changi Airport	Terminated	
Saudi Arabia	Jeddah	King Abdulaziz International Airport		
Saudi Arabia	Medina	Prince Mohammad bin Abdulaziz International Airport		

=== Codeshare and interline agreements ===
Lion Air has codeshare agreements and interline agreements with the following airlines:

=== Codeshare ===
- Jeju Air

=== Interline ===
- Batik Air
- Batik Air Malaysia
- Hahn Air
- Thai Lion Air
- Wings Air

== Fleet ==
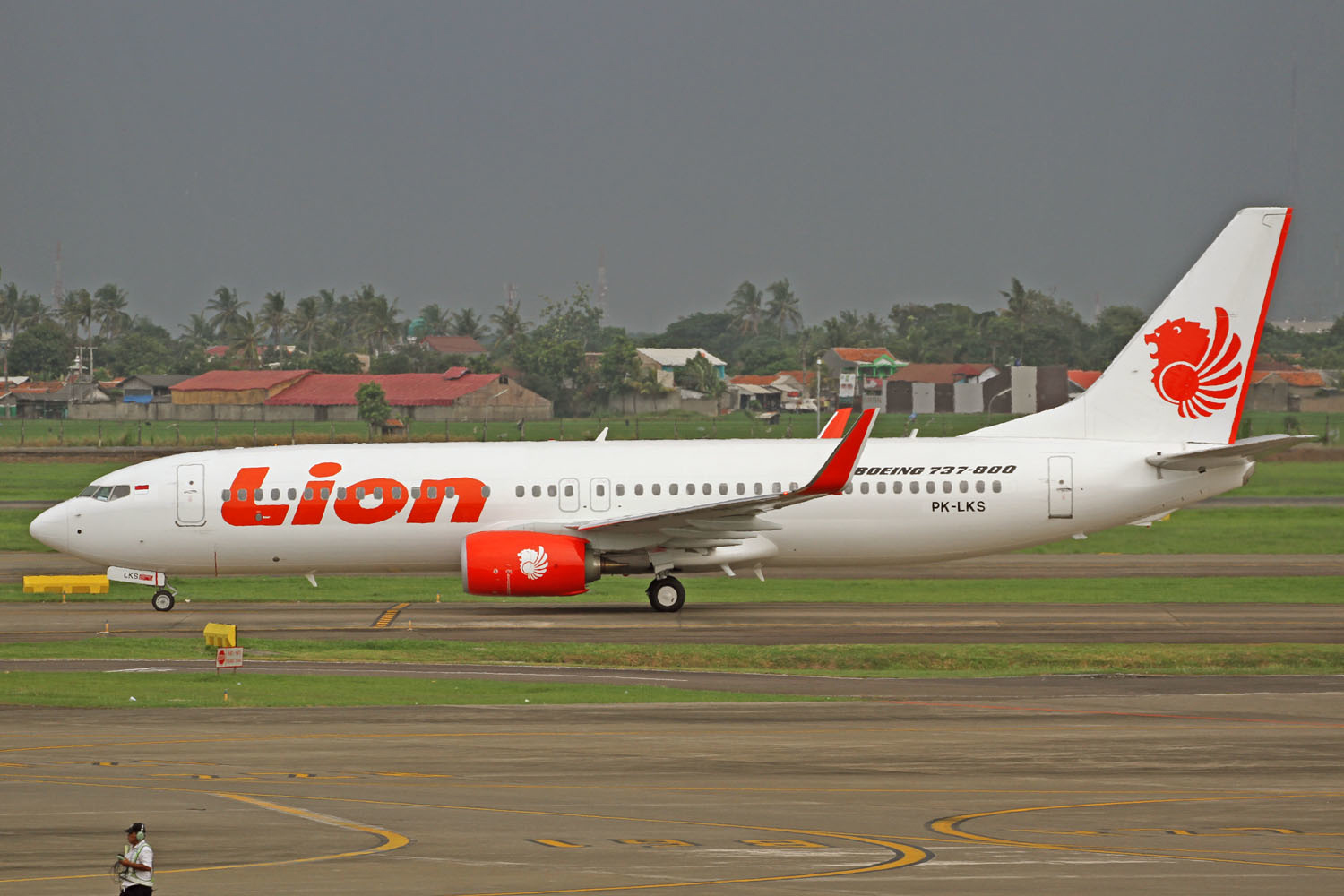
A Boeing 737-800 at Soekarno-Hatta International Airport

The Boeing customer code for Lion Air is GP, which appears in the designation of its older Boeing aircraft as an infix, such as 737-8GP and 737-9GPER.

=== Current fleet ===
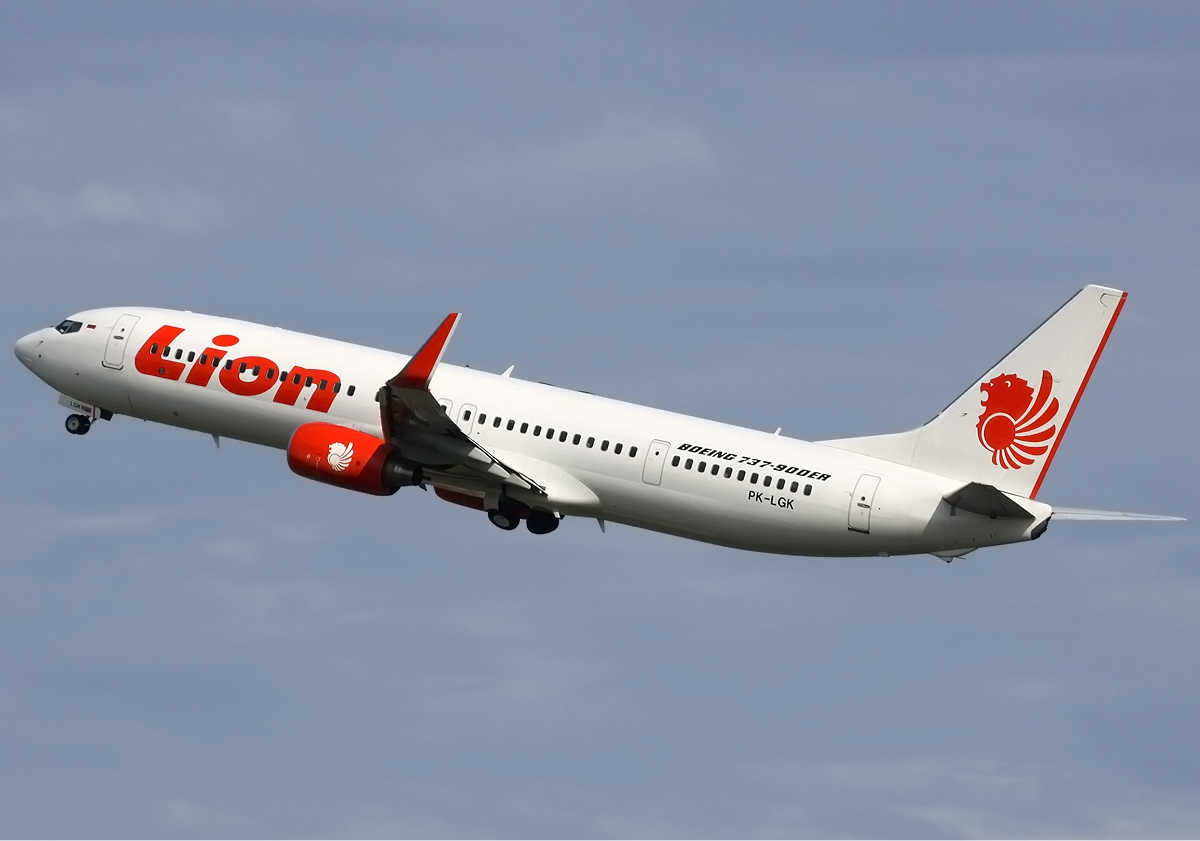
A Boeing 737-900ER

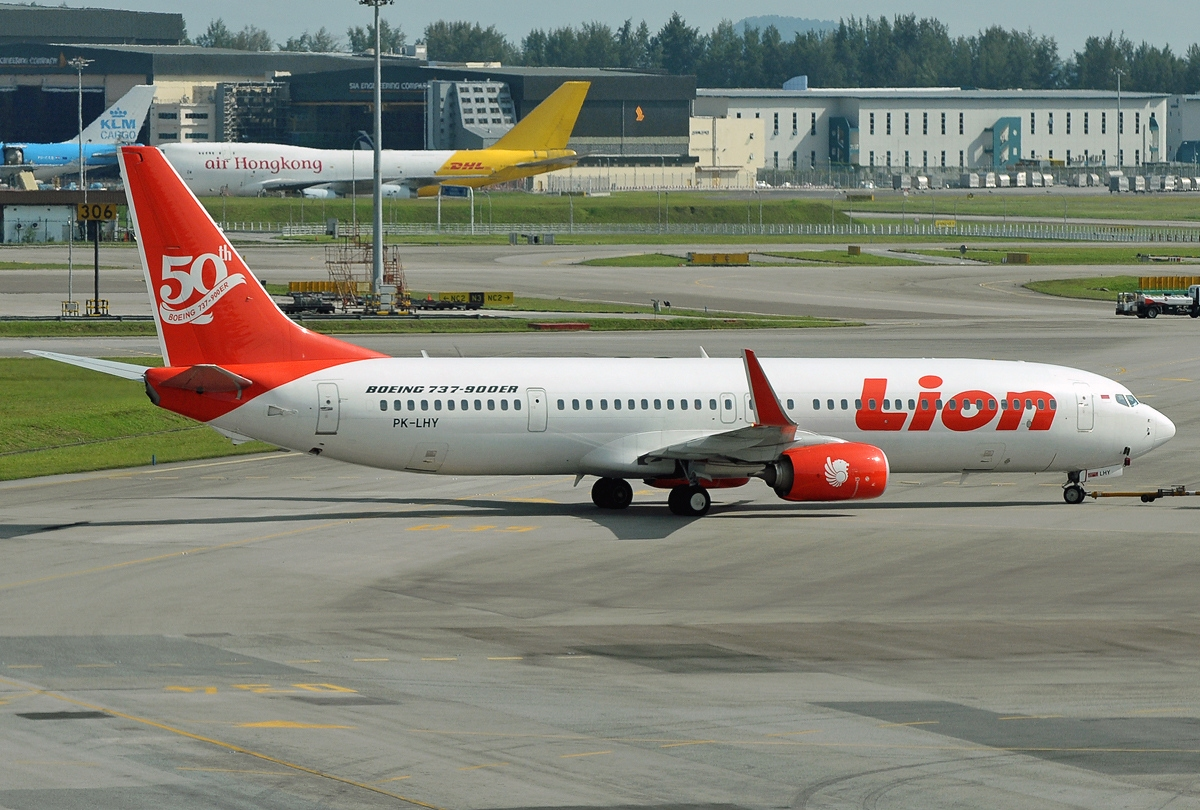
A Boeing 737-900ER in '50th 737-900ER built' livery, at Changi Airport

A Boeing 737 MAX 9

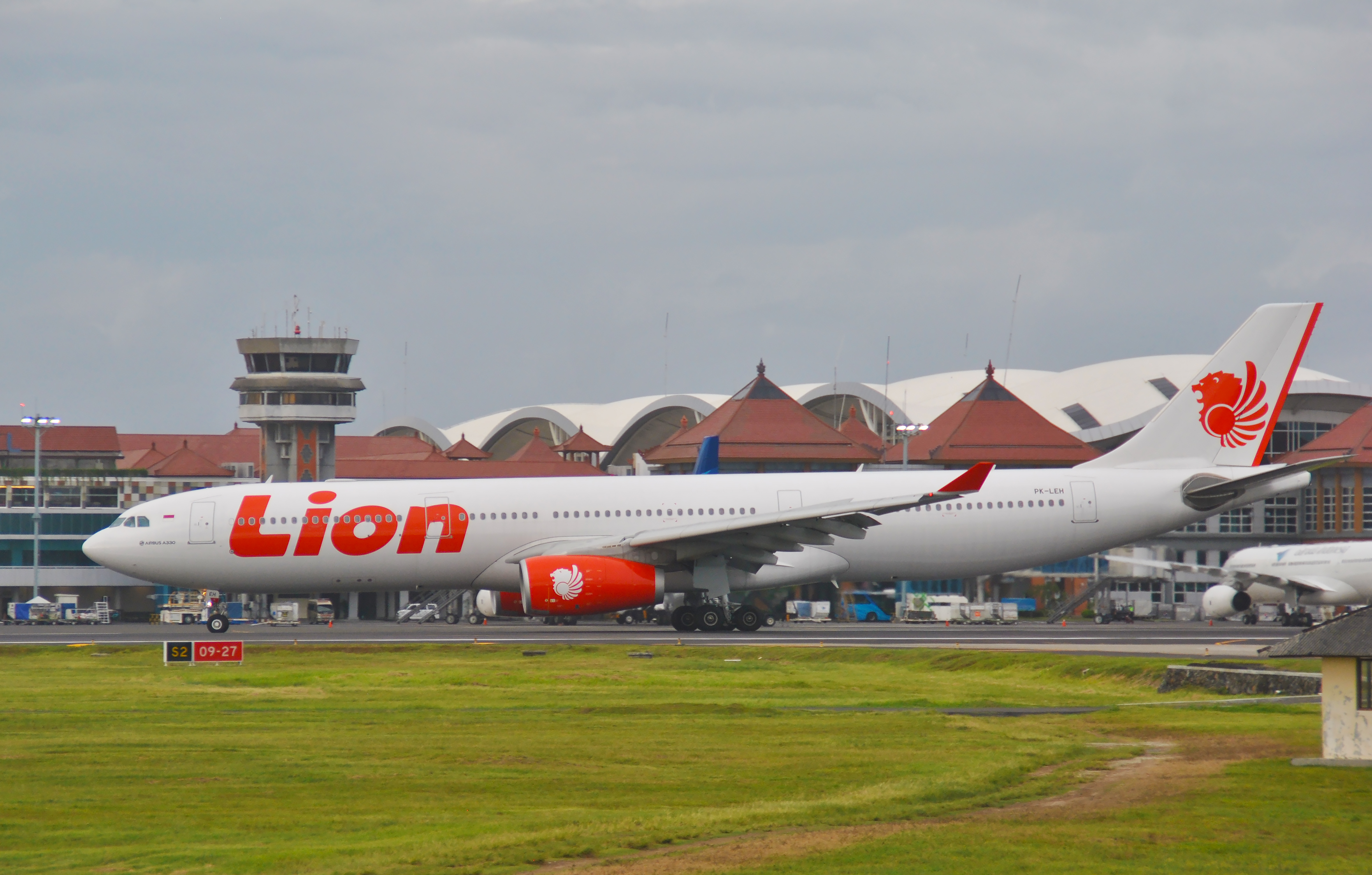
An Airbus A330-300 at Ngurah Rai International Airport

As of February 2026, Lion Air operates the following aircraft:

Lion Air fleet
Aircraft	In service	Orders	Passengers	Notes
Airbus A330-300	4	—	440	
Airbus A330-300	2	—	436	
Airbus A330-900	8	—	436	
Boeing 737-800	22	—	189	
Boeing 737-900ER	54	—	215	Launch customer. 2 aircraft are from Sriwijaya Air.
Boeing 737-900ER	1	—	213	Launch customer. 2 aircraft are from Sriwijaya Air.
Boeing 737 MAX 9	4	187	221	Order consisted of both the MAX 8 and 9 variants. Launch customer for the MAX 9 variant. All of Lion Air's MAX 8s have been transferred to Batik Air Malaysia.
Boeing 737 MAX 10	—	50	TBA	Launch customer for the MAX 10 variant.
Total	99	237		

=== Fleet development and orders ===
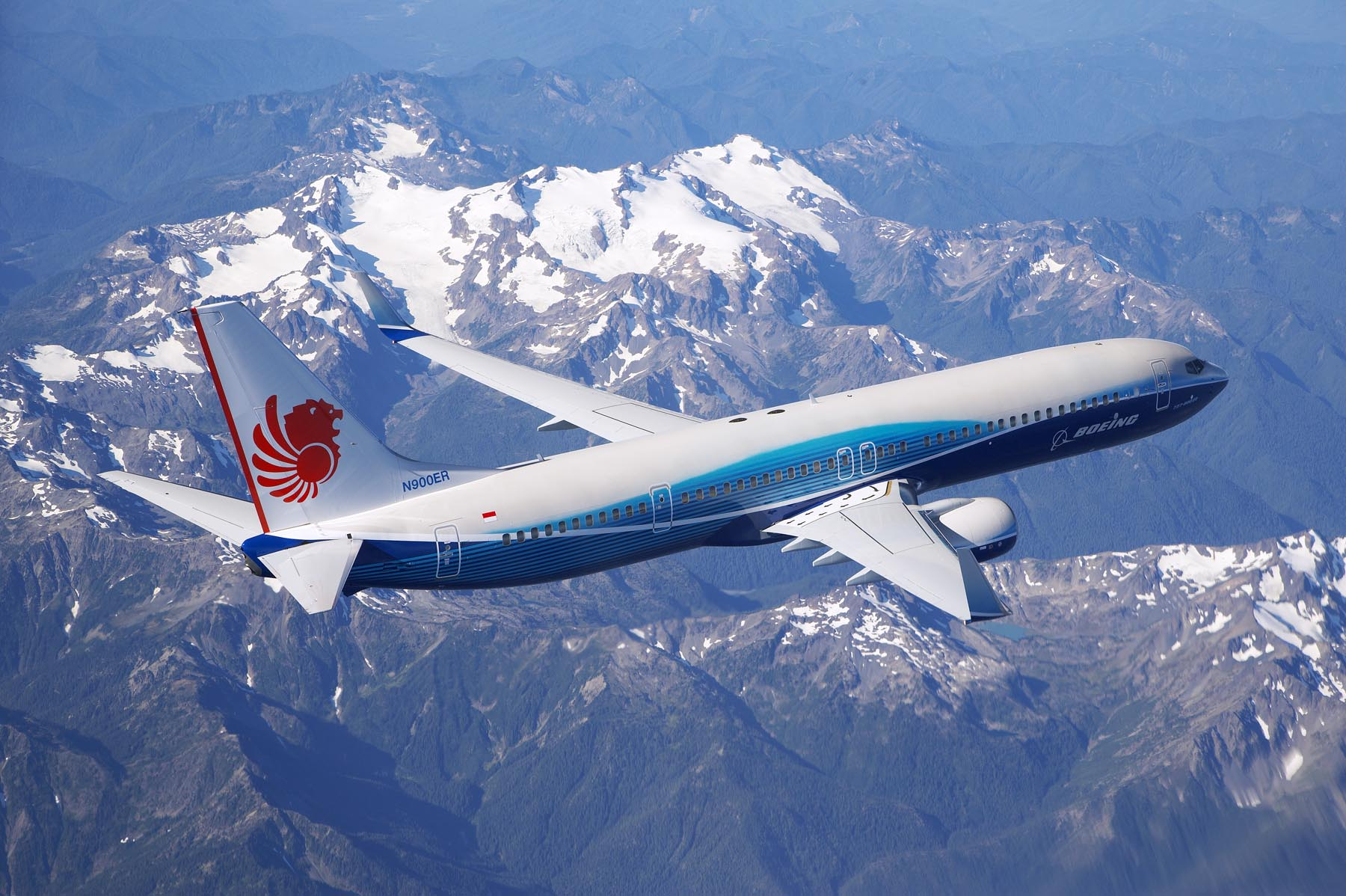
Lion Air was the launch customer of the 737-900ER, seen here on the type's first flight

Lion Air was the launch customer for the largest variant of the Boeing 737, the 737-900ER, for which it placed an order in 2005. On the 2005 Paris Air Show, Lion Air signed a preliminary agreement with Boeing for the purchase of up to 60 Boeing 737 Next Generation aircraft, valued at $3.9 billion at list prices. Lion Air confirmed their order in July 2005 and became the launch customer for the Boeing 737-900ER with firm orders for 30 aircraft and options for 30 more, which were later converted into firm orders. The -900ER can carry up to 215 passengers in a single-class layout, and is powered by CFM56-7B turbofan engines. On 27 April 2007, Boeing delivered the first 737-900ER to Lion Air. The aircraft was delivered in a special dual-paint scheme that combines Lion Air's logo on its vertical stabilizer and the Boeing "Dreamliner" livery on the fuselage.

Lion Air set a world record when it placed an order for 230 aircraft from Boeing, making this the largest order in terms of aircraft ordered as well the cost of the order. In November 2011, Lion Air and Boeing announced that the airline planned to buy 29 additional Boeing 737 Next Generation and 201 Boeing 737 MAX aircraft, with options for 150 more, valued at $21.7 billion at the time. A firm order was signed on 14 February 2012, with the 737 MAX aircraft identified as 737 MAX 9s, making Lion Air the launch customer for that variant. By the time of the signing, the order's value had risen to $22.4 billion at list prices, the largest aircraft order in history. Additionally, the engines for the -900ERs, CFM 56-7s, cost about $580 million and the engines for the MAXs, CFM LEAP-1Bs, cost about $4.8 billion. Deliveries of the additional NGs were to start in 2014, with the MAXs to follow in 2017.

On Monday, 18 March 2013, Lion Air placed an order for 234 Airbus A320 jets with Airbus, the largest single order ever made, surpassing the previous record by Boeing ($22.4 Billion). The contract, which was signed at the Elysée Palace in the presence of President François Hollande and several government ministers, was worth €18.4 billion ($24 billion) at catalogue prices, the French president said.

In April 2018, Lion Air Group placed an order for 50 Boeing 737 MAX 10 jets, valued at a list price of $6.24 billion.

However, following the crash of Flight 610 in October 2018, Lion Air announced that all Boeing orders would likely be cancelled. The statement was further reinforced following the crash of Ethiopian Airlines Flight 302, which eventually led to the worldwide grounding of all 737 MAX aircraft currently in service. In the days that followed after Flight 302's crash, Bloomberg News reported that Lion Air was evaluating options from Airbus, having already refused to take delivery of a 737 MAX that was going to be delivered in March 2019.

The airline received its first of 10 Airbus A330-900 aircraft on 19 July 2019, becoming the first Asia/Pacific operator of the type.

=== Former fleet ===
In the past, Lion Air has previously operated the following aircraft:

Aircraft	Total	Operated	Retired	Notes
Airbus A310-300	1	2000	2003	
Boeing 737-200	2	2001	2003	
Boeing 737-300	2	2006	2014	
Boeing 737-400	10	2004	2014	
Boeing 737 MAX 8	15	2017	2022	PK-LQP crashed as Flight 610. Remaining aircraft will be transferred to Batik Air Malaysia.
Boeing 747-400	2	2009	2019	Replaced by Airbus A330-900. PK-LHF is preserved as the Steak 21 Restaurant in Bekasi, while PK-LHG was scrapped.
McDonnell Douglas MD-82	17	2002	2012	One crashed as Flight 538.
McDonnell Douglas MD-83	1	2003	2008	
McDonnell Douglas MD-90-30	5	2005	2012	
Yakovlev Yak-42	5	2001	2002	

== Market share ==
Aviation market share in Indonesia (2015)
1. Lion Air (41.6%)
2. Garuda Indonesia (23.5%)
3. Sriwijaya Air (10.4%)
4. Citilink (8.90%)
5. Wings Air (4.70%)
6. Indonesia AirAsia (4.40%)
7. Others (6.50%)

In the 2000s Lion Air began to grow and became a serious rival for the flag carrier Garuda Indonesia in domestic air travel in Indonesia. By mid 2015, Lion Air led Indonesia's domestic air travel market with 41.6 percent share, while Garuda Indonesia came in second with 23.5 percent share. Sriwijaya Air came in third with a market share of 10.4 percent, followed by Garuda's low-cost subsidiary Citilink (8.9 percent) and Lion Air's regional flight service Wings Air (4.7 percent). Indonesia AirAsia, a unit of Malaysian budget airline AirAsia, had a 4.4 percent market share.

Overall, Indonesian domestic air travel business is overwhelmingly ruled by two airline groups; Lion Air Group and Garuda Indonesia. By mid 2015, Lion Air Group accounted for 43.17 percent of market share, while Garuda Indonesia had 37.08 percent of market share.

From 2005 to 2017, the domestic market share of Lion Air Group increased by more than 100%, from 25% to 51%, while Garuda Indonesia's increased from 24% to 33%; their international market share in 2017 was 21% and 39% respectively, while Indonesia AirAsia / Indonesia AirAsia X had 36% of the international market.

== Accidents and incidents ==
- On 14 January 2002, Lion Air Flight 386, a Boeing 737-200 (registration PK-LID) crashed after trying to take-off with an incorrect flap configuration at Sultan Syarif Kasim II International Airport. Everyone on board survived but the aircraft was written off. This was the first incident involving Lion Air.
- On 30 November 2004, Lion Air Flight 538, a McDonnell Douglas MD-82, crashed in Surakarta with registration PK-LMN (c/n 49189); 25 people died, including the captain.
- On 4 March 2006, Lion Air Flight 8987, a McDonnell Douglas MD-82, crashed after landing at Juanda International Airport. Reverse thrust was used during landing, although the left thrust reverser was stated to be out of service. This caused the aircraft to veer to the right and skid off the runway, coming to rest about 7,000 feet (2,100 m) from the approach end of the runway. There were no fatalities, but the aircraft was badly damaged and later written off.
- On 24 December 2006, Lion Air Flight 792, a Boeing 737-400 (registration PK-LIJ), landed with an incorrect flap configuration and was not aligned with the runway. The aircraft landed hard and skidded along the runway causing the right main landing gear to detach, the left gear to protrude through the wing and some of the aircraft fuselage to be wrinkled. There were no fatalities, but the aircraft was written off.
- On 2 November 2010, Lion Air Flight 712, a Boeing 737-400 (registration PK-LIQ) overran the runway on landing at Supadio Airport, Pontianak, coming to rest on its belly and sustaining damage to its nose gear. All 174 passengers and crew evacuated by the emergency slides, with few injuries.
- On 13 April 2013, Lion Air Flight 904, a Boeing 737-800 (registration PK-LKS; c/n 38728) from Bandung to Denpasar with 108 people on board, crashed into water short of the runway at Ngurah Rai International Airport while attempting to land. The aircraft's fuselage broke into two parts. All passengers and crew were evacuated from the aircraft and there were no fatalities.
- On 9 January 2015, following the fatal crash of Indonesia AirAsia Flight 8501, 53 routes operated by Lion Air and its subsidiaries were revoked by the transportation ministry as the airline had not been approved to fly. Among the 61 routes, Lion Air had the largest share.
- On 29 October 2018, Lion Air Flight 610, a Boeing 737 MAX 8, crashed in the Java Sea twelve minutes after takeoff from Jakarta. All 189 people on board died. Following the similar crash of Ethiopian Airlines Flight 302 less than five months later, the Boeing 737 MAX was grounded.
- In March 2019, former Indonesian transportation safety investigators and a former Lion Air employee claimed that Lion Air had attempted to bribe transportation safety officials, including crash investigators, in at least one case with the knowledge of now-President Director of Lion Air, Edward Sirait.
- On 16 February 2019, Lion Air Flight 714, a Boeing 737-800, overran the runway at Supadio International Airport, Pontianak. All 189 occupants evacuated the aircraft via Escape Slide and Overwing Exit.

== See also ==
- Aviation in Indonesia
- Lion Air Group
- Batik Air Malaysia
- Wings Air
- Batik Air
- Thai Lion Air
- List of airlines of Indonesia
