= Flight 538 =

Flight 538 may refer to:

- Trans Australia Airlines Flight 538, crashed on 10 June 1960
- Lion Air Flight 538, crashed on 30 November 2004
