= Raja Haji Abdullah Airport =

Raja Haji Abdullah Airport Bandar Udara Raja Haji Abdullah
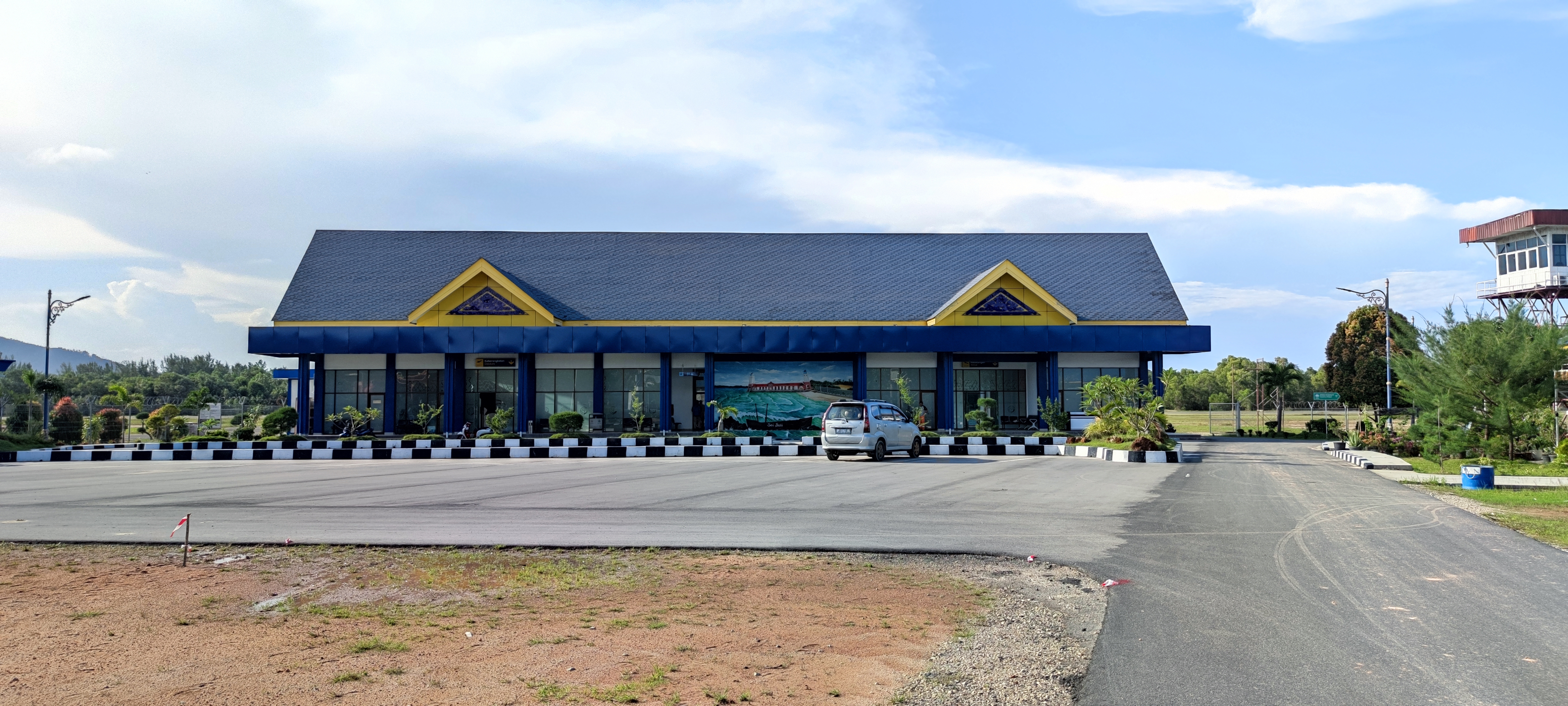
- IATA: TJB; ICAO: WIDT

Summary
- Airport type: Domestic
- Serves: Tanjung Balai
- Location: Tanjung Balai, Great Karimun island, Karimun Regency, Riau Islands Province, Indonesia
- Time zone: WIB (UTC+07:00)
- Elevation AMSL: 1 m (3.3 ft)
- Coordinates: 01°03′08″N 103°23′33″E

Map
- Location in Riau Islands Location in Sumatra

Runways
Direction	Length		Surface
Direction	m	ft	Surface
19L/27R	1,400	4,593	Asphalt

Raja Haji Abdullah Airport (IATA: TJB, ICAO: WIDT) is a domestic airport serving Tanjung Balai Karimun, on the Great Karimun island, in the Riau Islands Province of Indonesia.

== Airlines and destinations ==
Airlines	Destinations
Susi Air	Dabo, Pekanbaru

== Statistic ==
Frequency of flights at Raja Haji Abdullah Airport
Rank	Destinations	Frequency (weekly)	Airline(s)
1	Pekanbaru, Riau	3	Susi Air
2	Dabo, Riau Islands	1	Susi Air
