= Dabo Airport =

Dabo Airport Bandar Udara Dabo
- IATA: SIQ; ICAO: WIDS

Summary
- Airport type: Civil
- Serves: Dabo
- Location: Dabo, Riau Islands, Indonesia
- Hub for: Susi Air
- Time zone: WIB (UTC+07:00)
- Elevation AMSL: 17 m / 56 ft
- Coordinates: 00°28′54″S 104°34′52″E

Map
- Location in Riau Islands Location in Sumatra

Runways
Direction	Length		Surface
Direction	m	ft	Surface
14/32	1,300	4,265	Asphalt

Statistics (2016)
- Passenger: 10486 (▲29.9%)
- Aircraft movements: 1205 (▲3.5%)
- Source: Statistics of Riau Islands Province

Dabo Airport (IATA: SIQ, ICAO: WIDS) is a domestic airport located at Dabo, the largest town in Singkep Island, Riau Islands province of Indonesia. It serves Dabo and surrounding areas. Dabo Airport serves ATR 72, ATR 42, Fokker 50, and others.

== Airlines and destinations ==
Airlines	Destinations
Susi Air	Batam, Jambi, Pangkal Pinang, Pekanbaru, Tanjung Balai Karimun, Tanjung Pinang
Wings Air	Batam

== Statistics and traffic ==
=== Traffic ===
Overall operational statistics
Year	Passenger movements	Aircraft movements
2012	2,902	114
2013	4,478	276
2014	5,209	620
2015	8,075	1,164
2016	10,486	1,205

=== Statistics ===
Frequency of flights at Dabo Airport
Rank	Destinations	Frequency (weekly)	Airline(s)
1	Batam, Riau Islands	9	Susi Air, Wings Air, XpressAir
2	Pekanbaru, Riau	5	Susi Air
3	Tanjung Pinang, Riau Islands	3	Susi Air
4	Jambi, Jambi	3	Susi Air
5	Pangkal Pinang, Bangka Belitung	2	Susi Air
6	Tanjung Balai Karimun, Riau Islands	1	Susi Air
