= Sultan Syarif Kasim II International Airport =

Airport serving Pekanbaru, Riau, Indonesia

Sultan Syarif Kasim II International Airport Bandar Udara Internasional Sultan Syarif Kasim II
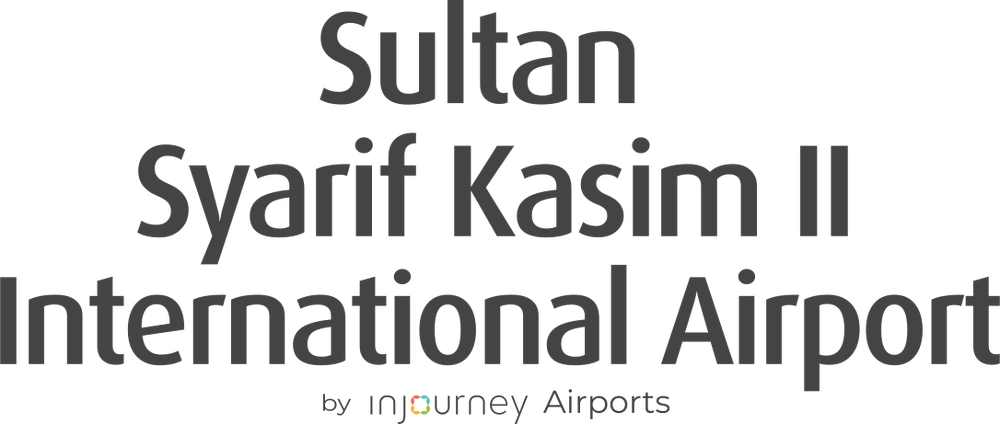

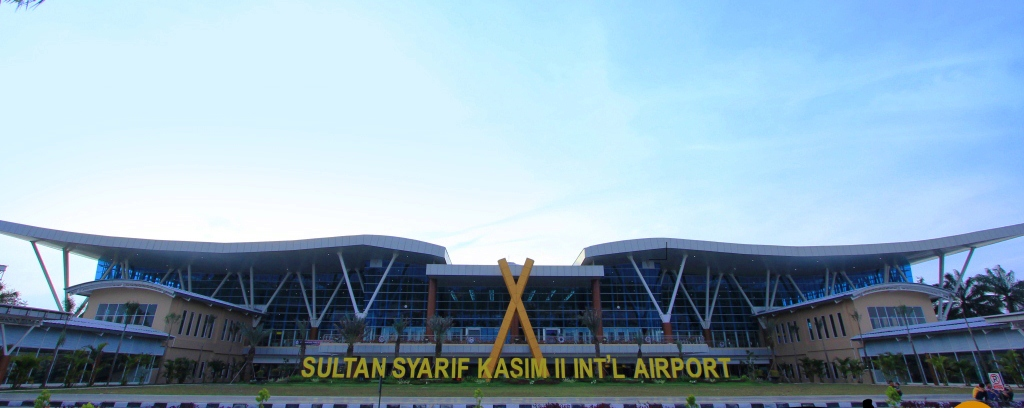
- IATA: PKU; ICAO: WIBB; WMO: 96109

Summary
- Airport type: Public / Military
- Owner: Government of Indonesia
- Operator: InJourney Airports
- Serves: Pekanbaru
- Location: Pekanbaru, Riau, Indonesia
- Opened: 1940; 86 years ago
- Operating base for: Susi Air
- Time zone: WIB (UTC+07:00)
- Elevation AMSL: 104 ft (32 m)
- Coordinates: 0°27′34″N 101°26′40″E
- Website: www.sultansyarifkasim2-airport.co.id

Maps
- Sumatra region in Indonesia

- Location of airport in Pekanbaru, Riau, Indonesia PKU/WIBB (Sumatra) PKU/WIBB (Indonesia) PKU/WIBB (Southeast Asia) PKU/WIBB (Asia)

Runways
Direction	Length		Surface
Direction	ft	m	Surface
18/36	8,530	2,600	Asphalt

Statistics (2024)
- Passengers: 2,740,043 (▼0.5%)
- Cargo (tonnes): 20,311 (▲19.4%)
- Aircraft movements: 22,751 (▼1.8%)
- Source: DGCA

Sultan Syarif Kasim II International Airport (IATA: PKU, ICAO: WIBB) is an international airport serving the city of Pekanbaru, the provincial capital of Riau, Indonesia. The airport was formerly known as Simpang Tiga Airport, named after the subdistrict in which it is located. It was later renamed in honor of Sultan Syarif Kasim II (1893–1968), the last sultan of the Sultanate of Siak Sri Indrapura and was recognized as a national hero of Indonesia. The airport is located about 5 km (3.1 mi) from the center of Pekanbaru and serves as the main gateway to the city, the surrounding region, and Riau as a whole. The airport serves major Indonesian cities such as Jakarta, Medan, and Batam, as well as international destinations in neighboring countries, including Malaysia and Singapore.

The airport area and runway are shared with Roesmin Nurjadin Air Force Base, a Type A airbase of the TNI-AU (Indonesian Air Force). The airbase is named after the former Chief of Staff of the Indonesian Air Force, Air Chief Marshal Roesmin Nurjadin. it served as the homebase of the 16th Air Squadron, which operates the F-16 Fighting Falcon, and the 12th Air Squadron which operates the BAe Hawk Mk. 209 and Mk. 109.

== History ==
=== Colonial history ===
The airport was originally built in 1930 by the Dutch colonial government, following permission from the Sultan of Siak, who donated 3,270 hectares of land for its development. The airfield became known as Simpang Tiga Airfield, named after its location near a major intersection on the Trans-Sumatra Highway connecting Pekanbaru to Kampar Regency and Indragiri Hulu Regency. Its construction greatly enhanced the Dutch colonial administration's connectivity with the outside world. In addition to supporting trade, the airfield also served as a base for the Royal Netherlands East Indies Army Air Force. The airfield also served as a transit stop for KNILM (Royal Dutch Indies Airways) on its Batavia–Medan and Batavia–Singapore routes.

The airport was seized by the Japanese during World War II, following the invasion of the Dutch East Indies and the subsequent Dutch capitulation. During the occupation, the airfield was used by a small squadron of aircraft from the Imperial Japanese Army Air Service. Owing to its strategic location near the Strait of Malacca, the airbase was considered a valuable asset, enabling the Japanese to conduct aerial patrols over the strait using aircraft stationed at the site. The Japanese subsequently developed the airfield using forced laborers known as romusha, most of whom were recruited from Java.

Following the Japanese surrender, the airfield was taken over by Republican militias. As part of efforts to reassert control over Riau, the Dutch attempted to retake the airbase. On 2 July 1946, a Dutch B-25 Mitchell bomber conducted a strafing run on the runway in preparation for the assault. In response, the militias shot down the aircraft, killing 11 Dutch airmen. One surviving crew member was captured, treated for his injuries, and later transferred to Bukittinggi as a prisoner of war. The airfield was attacked again during Operation Kraai, as the Dutch sought to capture it. Following a massive airstrike, Dutch forces landed paratroopers and captured the airfield on 1 January 1949. Republican militias largely withdrew, destroying several buildings and facilities beforehand to prevent them from falling into Dutch hands.

=== Post-independence era ===
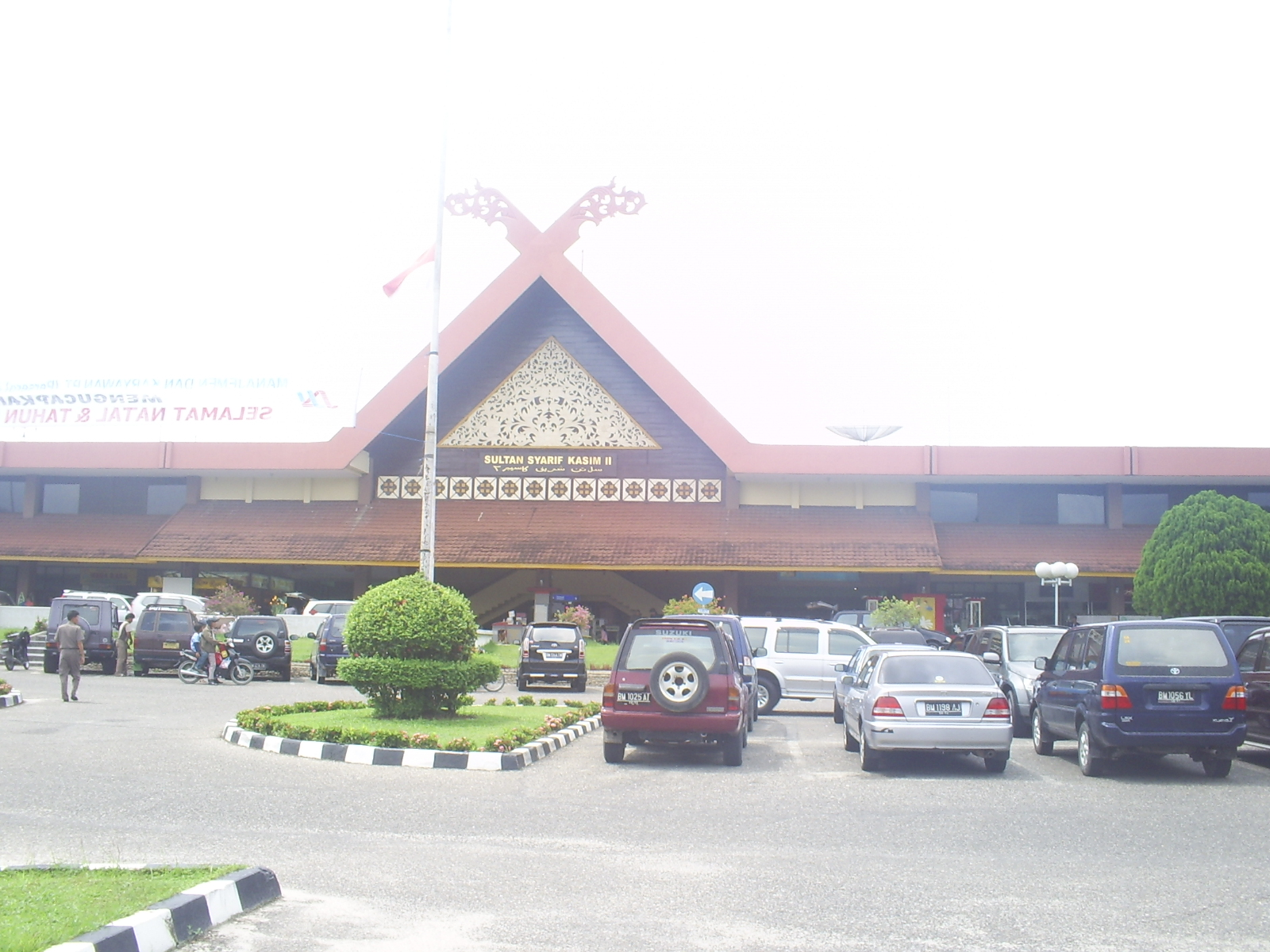
The former terminal building, demolished in 2013

Following the Dutch withdrawal from Indonesia, the newly established Garuda Indonesian Airways began serving Pekanbaru with flights from Jakarta, with stopovers in Padang or Palembang. During the early years of independence, a new runway was constructed adjacent to the old airfield. Initially measuring 800 m (2,625 ft) and designated as runways 18 and 36, it was extended to 1,500 m (4,921 ft) in 1950.

The airfield was captured by PRRI rebels during the civil war in Central Sumatra in the late 1950s and subsequently served as a major rebel base in Riau. It was recaptured by government forces on 16 March 1958 following a major offensive known as Operasi Tegas ("Operation Firm"), which involved a joint operation by special forces from the Indonesian Air Force and Indonesian Army.

By 1967, both the runway and aircraft parking apron had been paved with asphalt to a thickness of 7 cm (2.8 in), while the runway had been extended by an additional 500 m (1,640 ft). At the time, Simpang Tiga Airport was designated as the main entry point for Caltex employees working at the company's oil refineries in Rumbai. Special flights were operated for them from Jakarta using Fokker F28 aircraft.

On 1 April 1994, management of Simpang Tiga Airport was transferred to Angkasa Pura II, later rebranded as InJourney Airports. In 2000, the airport was renamed after Sultan Syarif Kasim II, the former Sultan of Siak, who advocated for the integration of Riau into Indonesia and was later recognized as a national hero of Indonesia. The renaming was ordered by then-President Abdurrahman Wahid, who issued a special decree authorizing the change.

=== Contemporary history ===
In early 2010, the airport underwent its first major expansion with the construction of a modern terminal to replace the original facility, which had been built in the 1980s but had become overcrowded and unable to accommodate increasing passenger numbers and air traffic. As part of the development, the old terminal was demolished to make way for expanded parking areas. The new terminal features a contemporary design, and a larger aircraft apron to accommodate growing air traffic.

The airport has received several awards. In 2012 and 2013, the Indonesian Ministry of Culture and Tourism consecutively awarded the airport the title of "Cleanest Airport Toilet." In 2013, the airport was again named The Best Airport by Angkasa Pura II at Bandara Award 2013, held by Indonesia's Ministry of Culture and Tourism; it beat several prominent airports such as Soekarno–Hatta International Airport in Jakarta, Minangkabau International Airport in Padang and many other airports that are managed under Angkasa Pura II.

== Facilities and development ==
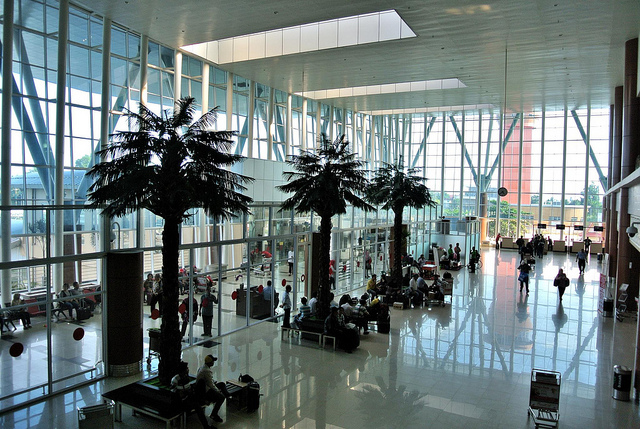
Check-in area

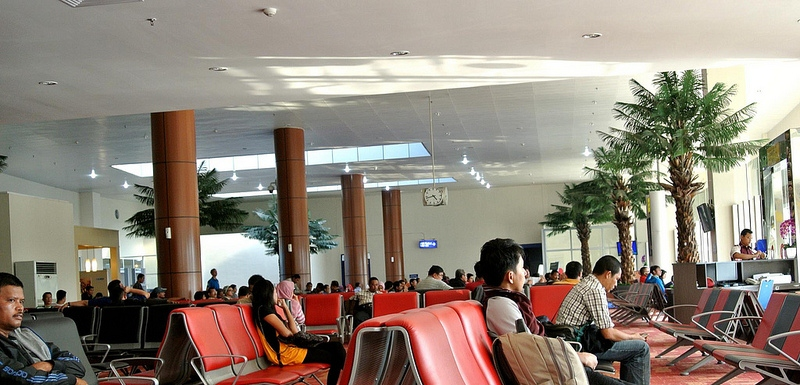
Boarding gate

On 16 July 2012, a new terminal costing 165 billion rupiah was inaugurated, increasing the airport's annual passenger-handling capacity to 14 million. The terminal was designed to accommodate eight narrow-body aircraft, such as the Boeing 737-900ER, and two wide-body aircraft, equivalent in size to the Boeing 747, simultaneously. Covering 25,000 m² (183,000 sq ft), the terminal was complemented by an expanded aircraft apron capable of accommodating 10 wide-body aircraft, twice the capacity of the previous apron. Its design combines Malay and modern architectural elements, with the structure inspired by the serindit, a bird native to Riau.

As part of efforts to upgrade the airport's infrastructure, the runway was extended from 2,200 m (7,218 ft) to 2,600 m (8,530 ft) and widened from 30 m (98 ft) to 45 m (148 ft). A further extension to 3,000 m (9,843 ft) was also planned. The improvements were undertaken in preparation for the 2012 Pekan Olahraga Nasional, which was held in Pekanbaru. Although the new terminal opened in 2012, two of its three jet bridges did not enter service until late July 2014. The airport now has four jet bridges. The former terminal was subsequently demolished to make way for an expanded apron, while a new air traffic control (ATC) tower was constructed to support the upgraded facilities.

A further expansion project began in June 2013 and was completed in 2014. The airport's apron was expanded to 58,410 m² (628,700 sq ft), allowing it to accommodate up to 12 narrow-body aircraft, such as the Boeing 737-900ER, as well as wide-body aircraft including the Airbus A330, Boeing 747, and Boeing 777. The development also included plans for a parallel runway and further expansion of the passenger terminal, with Angkasa Pura II targeting an annual capacity of eight million passengers. The planned expansion also called for three additional jet bridges, increasing the total to seven. The airport was also designated to support Hajj pilgrimage flights, particularly serving pilgrims from Riau Province and Pekanbaru.

=== New airport ===
Due to limited land availability and its proximity to the city center, where surrounding areas are densely developed with residential settlements, the airport has limited scope for further expansion. Plans are underway to construct a new airport in Siak Regency to replace the existing facility, which is operating beyond its intended capacity. A study on the relocation and selection of a site for a new airport was conducted by the Directorate General of Civil Aviation of the Ministry of Transportation in 2007. The study identified a site in Siak Regency, located relatively close to the provincial capital, Pekanbaru. The proposed site covers a large area and is situated away from residential settlements. The proposed site for the new airport in Siak Regency is located approximately 97 km (60 mi) from Sultan Syarif Kasim II International Airport in Pekanbaru.

== Airlines and destinations ==
=== Passenger ===
Airlines	Destinations
AirAsia	Kuala Lumpur–International
Batik Air	Jakarta–Soekarno-Hatta
Batik Air Malaysia	Kuala Lumpur–International
Citilink	Batam, Jakarta–Halim Perdanakusuma, Jakarta–Soekarno-Hatta
Garuda Indonesia	Jakarta–Soekarno-Hatta
Lion Air	Batam, Jakarta–Soekarno-Hatta, Kuala Lumpur–International, Medan, Surabaya, Yogyakarta–International
Malaysia Airlines	Kuala Lumpur–International
Pelita Air	Jakarta–Soekarno-Hatta
Scoot	Singapore
Super Air Jet	Bandung–Husein Sastranegara, (begins 5 December 2026) Batam, Jakarta–Soekarno-Hatta, Medan
Susi Air	Dabo, Padang, Tanjung Balai Karimun
Wings Air	Gunungsitoli

=== Cargo ===
Airlines	Destinations
Asia Cargo Airlines	Bandung–Kertajati
Cardig Air	Jakarta–Halim Perdanakusuma

== Statistics ==
A Merpati Nusantara Airlines Fokker 100 landing at Sultan Syarif Kasim II International Airport, 2003

A Garuda Indonesia Boeing 737-400 at Sultan Syarif Kasim II International Airport, 2003

Annual passenger numbers and aircraft statistics
Year	Passengers handled	Passenger % change	Cargo (tonnes)	Cargo % change	Aircraft movements	Aircraft % change
2006	1,756,343	Steady	11,601	Steady	19,641	Steady
2007	1,839,684	▲4.7	11,346	▼2.2	20,480	▲4.3
2008	1,834,302	▼0.3	12,839	▲13.2	16,450	▼19.7
2009	1,913,504	▲4.3	11,393	▼11.3	19,835	▲20.6
2010	2,280,567	▲19.2	12,979	▲13.9	19,164	▼3.4
2011	2,527,367	▲10.8	13,742	▲5.9	19,556	▲2.0
2012	2,772,264	▲9.7	14,397	▲4.8	21,797	▲11.5
2013	3,257,547	▲17.5	12,034	▼16.4	26,422	▲21.2
2014	2,808,765	▼13.8	11,399	▼5.3	22,001	▼16.7
2015	2,670,046	▼4.9	9,319	▼18.2	19,206	▼12.7
2016	3,386,243	▲26.8	10,431	▲11.9	25,765	▲34.2
2017	3,869,567	▲14.3	17,126	▲64.2	31,788	▲23.4
2018	4,126,581	▲6.6	22,761	▲32.9	32,936	▲3.6
2019	3,139,639	▼23.9	18,686	▼17.9	27,453	▼16.6
2020	1,420,453	▼54.8	17,189	▼9.0	15,404	▼43.9
2021	1,205,012	▼15.2	14,450	▼15.9	12,718	▼17.4
2022	2,244,924	▲86.3	14,148	▼2.1	18,163	▲42.8
2023	2,752,561	▲22.6	17,018	▲20.3	23,165	▲27.5
2024	2,740,043	▼0.5	20,311	▲19.4	22,751	▼1.8
^{Source: DGCA, BPS}

== Ground transportation ==
=== Bus ===
Route 1A of Trans Metro Pekanbaru connected the airport to downtown Pekanbaru.

== Accidents and incidents ==
- On 28 April 1981, a Douglas C-47 operated by Airfast Indonesia was conducting a charter flight from Singapore to Pekanbaru, carrying four crew members and 13 employees of Hudbay Oil Company. During the final approach to Simpang Tiga Airport, the right engine failed, resulting in a loss of power. The aircraft subsequently crashed approximately 2 km (1.2 mi) short of the runway threshold. Three passengers sustained serious injuries, while the other 14 occupants were killed.
- On 29 September 1999, an Antonov An-12 operated by Air Sofia was conducting a cargo flight on behalf of Mandala Airlines. During the final approach to Pekanbaru-Simpang Tiga Airport, the four-engine aircraft struck the ground approximately 1,300 m (4,265 ft) short of the runway and crashed, breaking into two sections. All seven crew members survived with minor injuries.
- On 14 January 2002, Lion Air Flight 386, a Boeing 737-200 operating from Pekanbaru to Batam, crashed during takeoff from Sultan Syarif Kasim II International Airport. The aircraft's nose lifted off the runway, but it failed to become airborne despite increasing engine power, and the stick shaker activated. The captain subsequently rejected the takeoff and applied reverse thrust and braking. The crew turned the aircraft slightly to the right to avoid the approach lights, but the aircraft struck trees and came to a stop about 275 m (902 ft) beyond the runway end. One passenger sustained serious injuries, while the remaining passengers suffered minor injuries. All crew members were uninjured. There were no fatalities, but the aircraft was written off as a total loss. The National Transportation Safety Committee (NTSC) subsequently determined that the most probable cause of the accident was the improper execution of the takeoff checklist.
