= Lion Air Flight 538 =

2004 aircraft crash in Surakarta, Indonesia

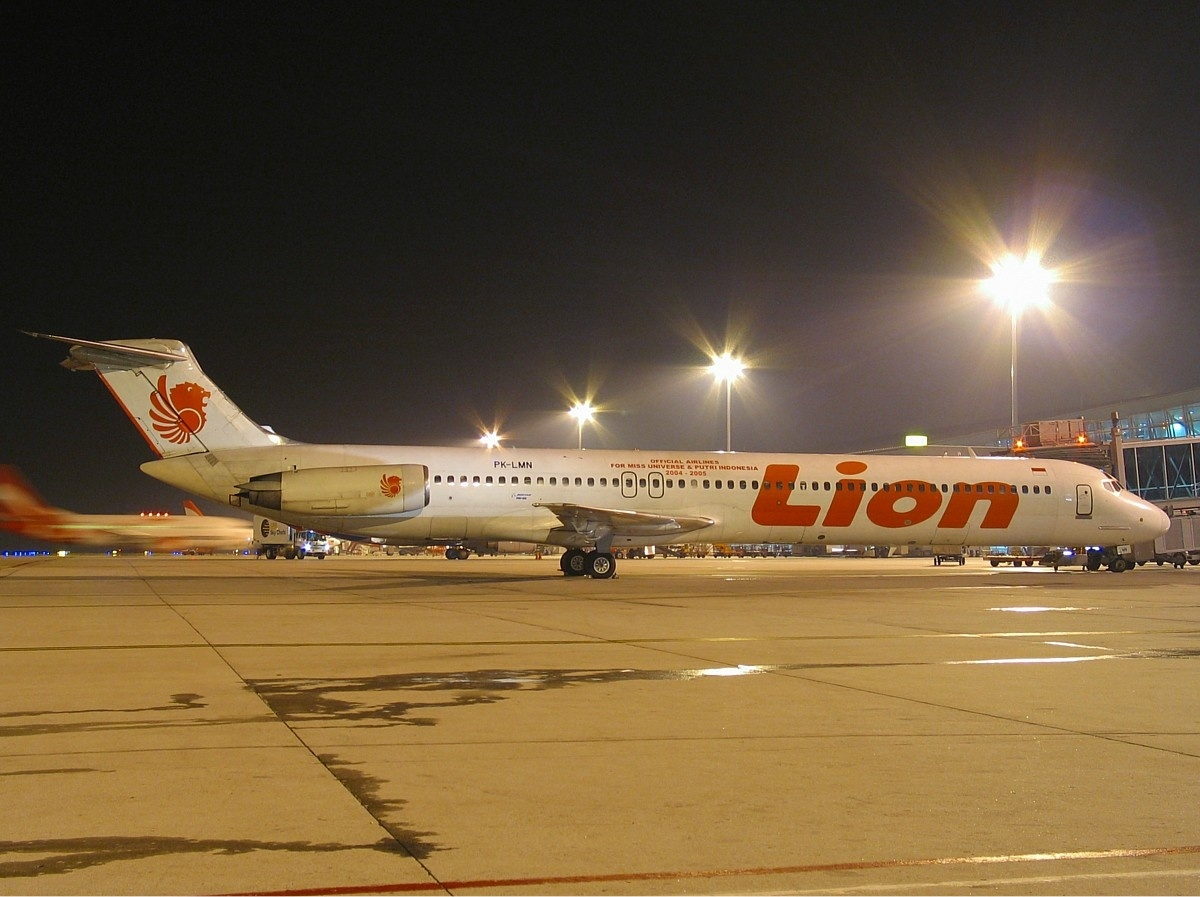
- PK-LMN, the aircraft involved in the accident, seen in August 2004

Accident
- Date: 30 November 2004
- Summary: Runway overrun due to hydroplaning aggravated by a wind shear and microburst
- Site: Adisumarmo International Airport Surakarta, Indonesia

Aircraft
- Aircraft type: McDonnell Douglas MD-82
- Operator: Lion Air
- IATA flight No.: JT538
- ICAO flight No.: LNI538
- Call sign: LION INTER 538
- Registration: PK-LMN
- Flight origin: Soekarno-Hatta International Airport; Jakarta, Indonesia
- Stopover: Adisumarmo International Airport; Surakarta, Indonesia
- Destination: Juanda International Airport; Surabaya, Indonesia
- Occupants: 163
- Passengers: 156
- Crew: 7
- Fatalities: 25
- Injuries: 109
- Survivors: 138

Lion Air Flight 538 (JT538/LNI538) was a scheduled domestic passenger flight from Jakarta to Surabaya, with a stopover at Surakarta, all in Indonesia. On 30 November 2004, whilst landing at Surakarta, the McDonnell Douglas MD-82 overran the rain-soaked runway of Adi Sumarmo Airport, and impacted a concrete localizer antenna base beyond the end of the runway, causing the aircraft to break apart; 25 people on board were killed in the crash, including the captain. The investigation conducted by the Indonesian National Transportation Safety Committee concluded that the crash was caused by hydroplaning, which was aggravated by wind shear.

== Aircraft ==
The aircraft was a McDonnell Douglas MD-82, manufactured in 1984, acquired by Lion Air in 2002, and registered as PK-LMN.

== Accident ==
Flight 538 took off from Jakarta at around 5:00 pm WIB (10:00 UTC), carrying a total of 146 passengers and seven crew members. Most of the passengers were members of the Nahdlatul Ulama, who were attending a national meeting held after the victorious result of the 2004 Indonesian Presidential Election. The flight was uneventful until its landing.

The flight arrived at the airport during dusk, around 6:00 pm WIB in heavy rain. A thunderstorm was reportedly present during the landing.

Flight 538 was configured appropriately for landing, touched down "smoothly" according to most passengers, and the thrust reversers were deployed. The aircraft, however, failed to slow adequately, overran the runway, and slammed into an embankment. The impact caused the floor of the front portion of the plane to collapse, reportedly killing many of the passengers. The aircraft split into two sections, coming to rest in the end of the runway, and fuel began to leak. Passengers had difficulty locating emergency exits in the waning light. Some of the passengers self-evacuated through the opening in the fuselage.

=== Immediate aftermath ===
The airport was closed and emergency services were notified. Injured passengers were transported by police vehicles and ambulances to numerous hospitals across Solo. At least 14 of the dead were transported to the Pabelan Hospital. Six people, two dead and four injured, were transported to Panti Waluyo Hospital. Others were transported to Oen Kandangsapi, Brayat Minulya, Kasih Ibu, Oen Solo Baru, and PKU Muhammadiyah, as well as facilities in Boyolali and Karanganyar. Survivors with minor injuries were treated inside the airport VIP terminal.

Twenty-five people were killed and 59 others were seriously injured.

== Passengers and crew ==
Most of the passengers were Indonesians, while airport officials confirmed that one Singaporean man was among the injured. The pilots at the control of the flight were Captain Dwi Mawastoro and First Officer Stephen Lesdek. The Captain died in the crash, while the First Officer survived with serious injuries.

== Investigation ==
The newly elected Indonesian President Susilo Bambang Yudhoyono ordered an immediate investigation onto the cause of the crash of Flight 538 and stated that the investigation should be open to the public to prevent unwanted rumors in the aftermath of the crash. Minister of Transportation Hatta Rajasa stated that the Transportation Department would evaluate the Indonesian airline operations in response to the crash of Flight 538 in addition to two other similar incidents that occurred on the same day.

The black box was subsequently found on December 1, 2004, and was transported to the Adi Sumarmo Emergency Operations Center.

A witness to the crash claimed that lightning struck the plane during its landing phase. According to him, the landing light and the interior lighting were extinguished after the strike.

Lion Air "claimed responsibility" for the crash and stated that they would pay the hospital bills of the survivors. However, they denied that the crash was caused by the airline's misconduct, and stated that weather was the main factor. According to them, Flight 538 experienced a tailwind during its landing, which explained why the plane did not stop. Others claimed that the brakes or the thrust reversers malfunctioned. The pilot did not put the throttle into flight idle, which caused the spoiler to retract, one of the reverse thrusts also was found to be faulty.

The preliminary report was published in 2005. Investigators stated that the plane's braking system was not at its optimum level. This condition was aggravated by weather conditions during the accident. Investigators also identified a faulty thrust reverser as one of the causes of the crash; they subsequently issued several recommendations to Lion Air.

Lion Air continues to use the flight number 538, but only on the Jakarta-Solo route, primarily operated by a Boeing 737-800 or Boeing 737-900ER.

== See also ==
- American Airlines Flight 1420 another MD-82 that overran a runway in bad weather at Little Rock, Arkansas in 1999.
- Jeju Air Flight 2216 a similar crash that crashed into a concrete barrier on the edge of the runway at Muan, South Jeolla in 2024.
- List of accidents and incidents involving commercial aircraft
