= Raja Haji Fisabilillah Airport =

Airport in Tanjingpinang, Riau Islands, Indonesia

Raja Haji Fisabilillah Airport Bandar Udara Raja Haji Fisabilillah
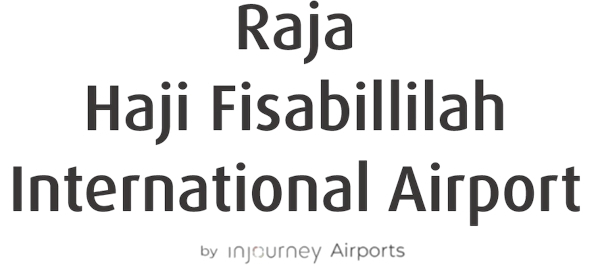

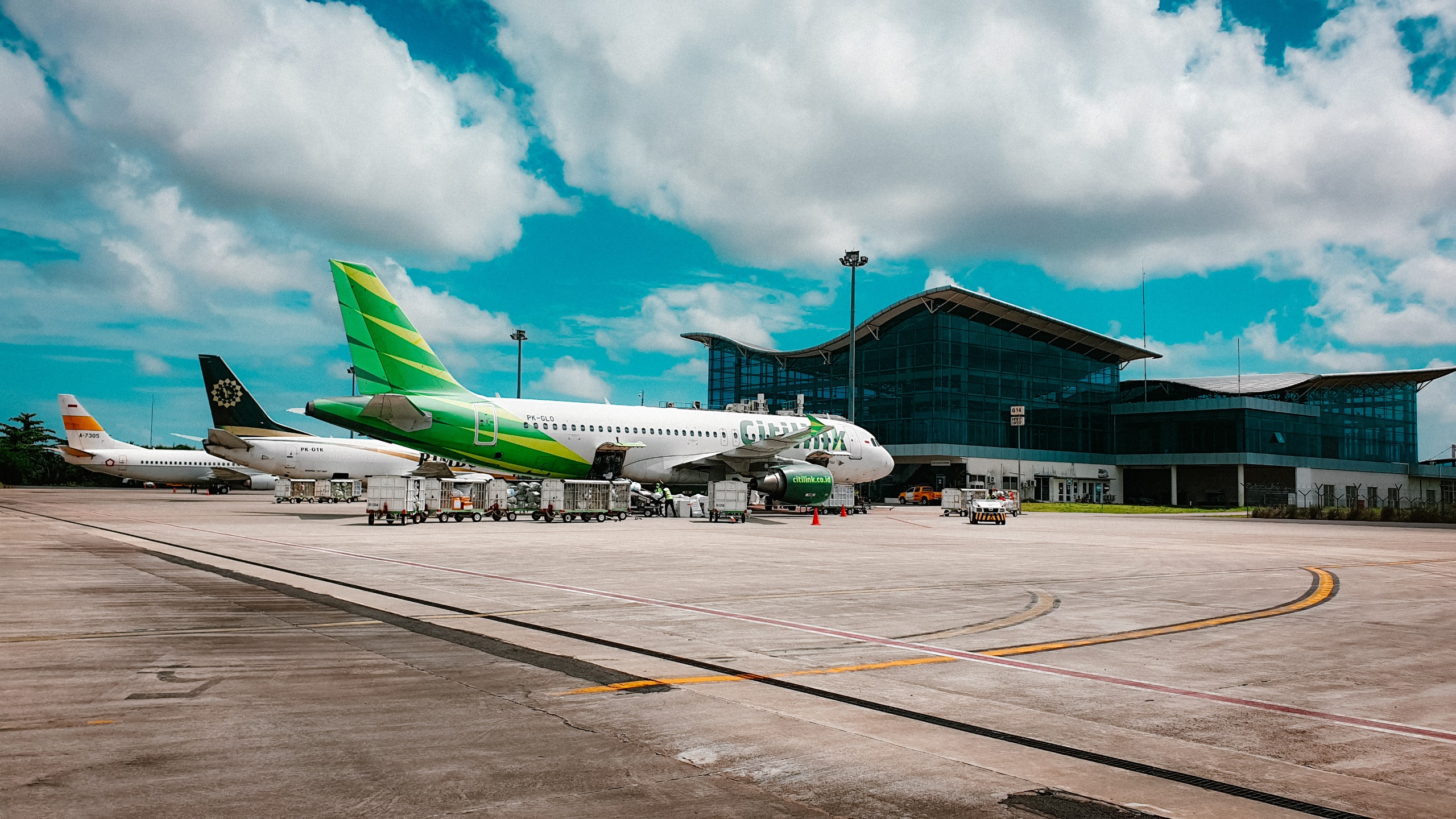
- IATA: TNJ; ICAO: WIDN

Summary
- Airport type: Public / Military
- Owner: Government of Indonesia
- Operator: InJourney Airports
- Serves: Bintan Island
- Location: Tanjungpinang, Riau Islands, Indonesia
- Time zone: WIB (UTC+07:00)
- Elevation AMSL: 52 ft (16 m)
- Coordinates: 00°55′21″N 104°31′56″E
- Website: www.rajahajifisabilillah-airport.co.id

Map
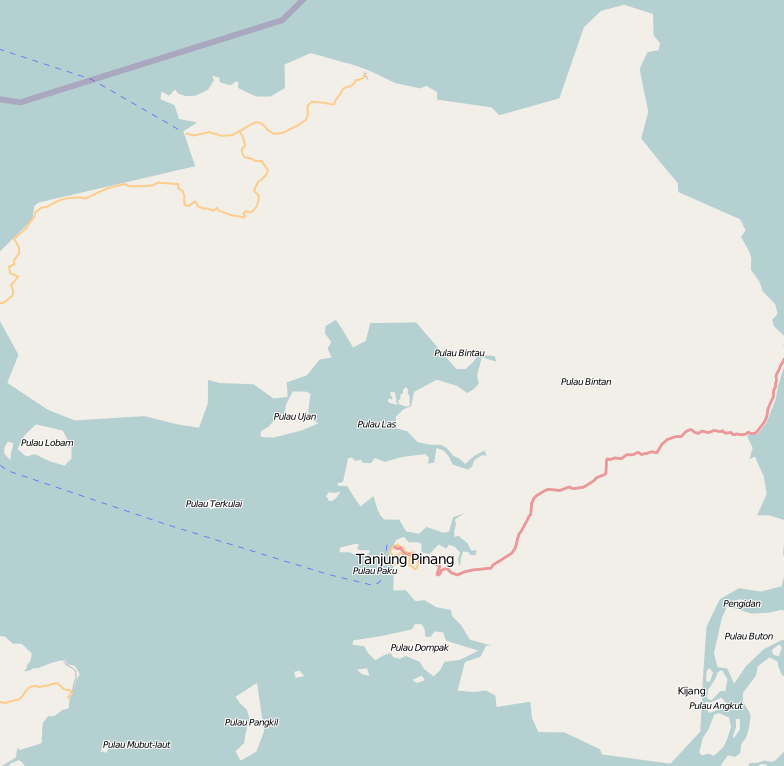
- Location in Bintan Island Location in Riau Islands

Runways
Direction	Length		Surface
Direction	m	ft	Surface
04/22	2,500	8,202	Asphalt]

Statistics (2024)
- Passengers: 263,680 (▲14.17%)
- Cargo (tonnes): 8,165.12 (▲32.50%)
- Aircraft movements: 4,048 (▲19.41%)
- Source: DGCA

Raja Haji Fisabilillah Airport (IATA: TNJ, ICAO: WIDN), formerly Kijang Airport, is an airport serving Tanjungpinang on Bintan Island, the capital of Riau Islands province, Indonesia. The airport is named after Raja Haji Fisabilillah (1727–1784), a Bugis-Malay leader and Yang di-Pertuan Muda of Riau who resisted Dutch colonization in the 18th century and is recognized as a National Hero of Indonesia. The airport is located approximately 7 km (4.3 miles) from Tanjungpinang city center. It is the second-largest and busiest airport in the Riau Islands, after Hang Nadim International Airport in Batam, and the only airport on Bintan Island, serving as the main gateway to both Tanjungpinang and Bintan. The airport currently handles limited domestic services, primarily to Jakarta and several regional destinations within the Riau Islands. In the past, it served routes to Batam and Pekanbaru, as well as international flights to Malaysia and China, all of which have since been discontinued.

In addition to civilian operations, the airport hosts Naval Air Station Tanjungpinang, a Class A facility of the Indonesian Navy’s Naval Aviation Center (Puspenerbal), located southeast of the passenger terminal across the runway. The Indonesian Air Force also maintains a presence at the airport through Raja Haji Fisabilillah Air Force Base, a Type B facility.

== History ==
=== Construction and early history ===
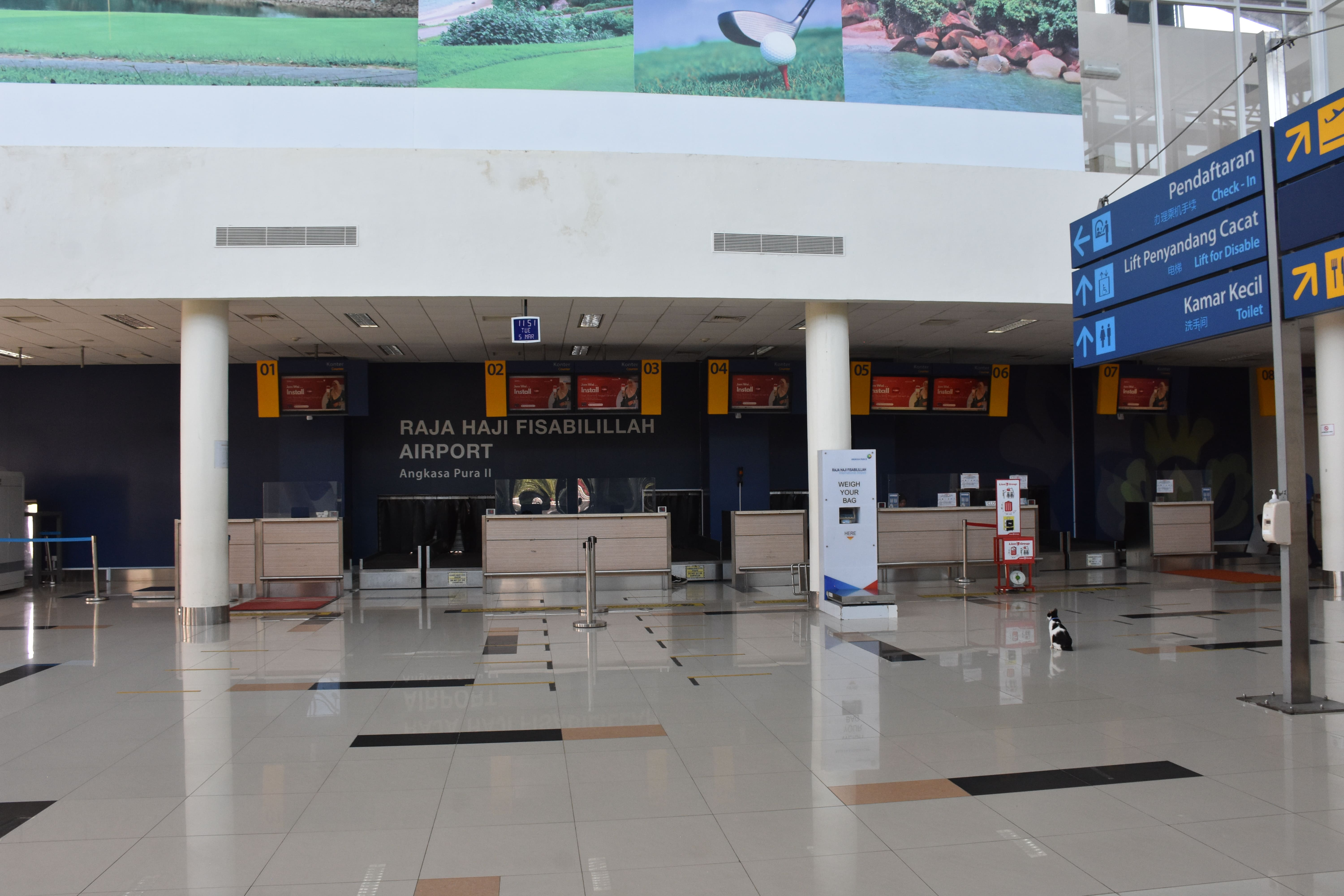
Check-in hall

During the Dutch colonial era, before an airport was established in Tanjungpinang, the only airfield in the Riau Islands was located in Dabo, Singkep, and was owned by the tin mining company Singkep Tin Maatschappij. As Tanjungpinang lacked an airfield, the Dutch carrier KLM operated amphibious aircraft, including Dornier Wal flying boats and Catalinas, which were capable of taking off from and landing on water. These aircraft served Tanjungpinang using the waters between the town and Penyengat Island as a landing area. Following the recognition of Indonesian sovereignty in 1949, the amphibious air route pioneered by KLM was continued by Garuda Indonesia using Catalina flying boats. However, on 19 July 1954, Garuda Indonesia discontinued the service.

The construction of Kijang Airfield took place during the transitional period between the Dutch administration and the Republic of Indonesia in the early 1950s. Previously, there are evidence that the Japanese had previously explored locations for an airfield in the vicinity of present-day Kijang to support their war effort against the Allies during the Pacific War of World War II, although these plans were never fully realised due to Japan's defeat in 1945. In 1951–1952, a survey team from Jakarta arrived, and the survey was soon followed by the construction of the airfield by the Public Works Department, together with several prominent contractors from Tanjungpinang. In 1953, Kijang Airfield was officially inaugurated by Minister of Transportation Adnan Kapau Gani as a modest facility, featuring a hardened bauxite runway and very limited aviation infrastructure. Records indicate that a Garuda Indonesia de Havilland Heron aircraft were among the first to land at the airfield.

During the PRRI rebellion in mainland Sumatra in the late 1950s, the airfield served as a major Indonesian Air Force base supporting operations against the rebels. In February 1958, the Indonesian military launched Operation Tegas, aimed at crushing the PRRI movement in Central Sumatra by targeting Pekanbaru, the provincial capital of Riau, which had fallen under rebel control. Kijang Airfield played a crucial role as a staging base for troops and aircraft, supporting airborne assaults and landing operations in Pekanbaru. At the height of the operation, up to 40 aircraft were concentrated at the airfield, including 26 C-47 Dakota transport aircraft, 10 P-51 Mustang fighters, and 4 B-25 Mitchell bombers. Following the operation, the Indonesian Air Force continued to conduct air raids from the airfield against PRRI strongholds, including Padang and Bukittinggi.

=== Contemporary period ===
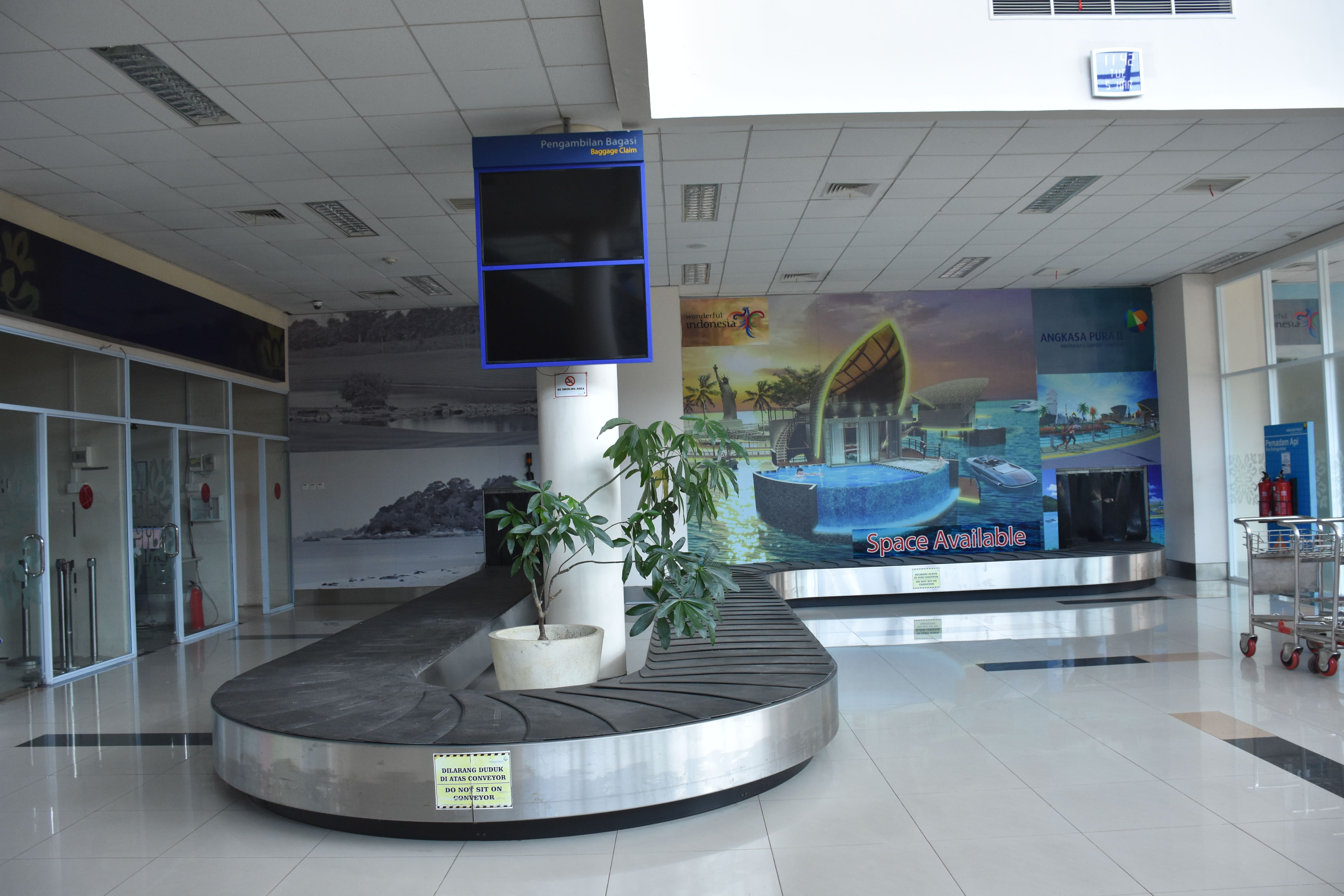
Baggage claim area

Initially, the airport was managed by the Directorate General of Civil Aviation under the Ministry of Transportation. In 2000, operations of Kijang Airport were transferred to Angkasa Pura II, which was later rebranded as InJourney Airports.

On 12 April 2008, Kijang Airport was officially renamed Raja Haji Fisabilillah International Airport in honour of Raja Haji Fisabilillah (1727–1784), the fourth Yang di-Pertuan Muda of Riau and a National Hero of Indonesia. The renaming was formalized during a ceremony officiated by then Minister of Transportation Jusman Syafii Djamal, which also marked the completion of the airport's renovation.

The airport was previously served by Sky Aviation on routes from Malacca, Malaysia, until mid-2013, when the airline ceased operations. Following this, the airport no longer had any regular international services. On 17 December 2016, Citilink launched charter flights from Tanjungpinang to Wuhan, briefly restoring international connectivity; however, these services were also short-lived.

On April 2, 2024, the Ministry of Transportation revoked the international airport status of Raja Haji Fisabilillah Airport due to the absence of regular international flights. The international status was reactivated in August 2025. Following its reactivation, in 2025, the airport planned to open international routes to two Malaysian cities including Johor Bahru and Kuala Lumpur. In 2026, it was announced that the AirAsia will be the first Malaysian low-cost airline to serve international flights from the airport, to Kuala Lumpur in the future.

== Facilities and development ==
In May 2007, the government allocated funding for the airport's development, with construction commencing in June. The project included the addition of new facilities such as radar systems, as well as an extension of the runway by approximately 400 metres, increasing its length from 1,856 metres to 2,256 metres. At the time, the airport was capable of accommodating narrow-body aircraft such as the Boeing 737-800, although with limited capacity. The runway was further extended to 2,500 metres in 2018 at a cost of approximately Rp 24 billion, enabling the airport to accommodate larger aircraft such as the Boeing 737-900ER.

A new passenger terminal covering 8,300 m^{2}, equipped with a jet bridge, was inaugurated in November 2013. The terminal has a design capacity of 1 million passengers per year, replacing the previous 1,200-square-metre facility, which could accommodate only 300,000 passengers annually. The terminal features a modern architectural design with Malay influences and a green, eco-friendly concept. Angkasa Pura II subsequently invested Rp 202.6 billion in the airport's development during the 2014–2015 period, including Rp 169.3 billion for airside facilities and Rp 33.3 billion for operational buildings and supporting infrastructure. The development included an apron expansion starting in 2014, increasing its capacity to accommodate up to five Boeing 737-900ER aircraft, compared to the previous capacity of only three Boeing 737 Classics. Angkasa Pura II also planned the construction of operational buildings, a fire station, and cargo facilities.

== Airlines and destinations ==
Airlines	Destinations
Batik Air	Jakarta–Soekarno-Hatta
Citilink	Jakarta–Soekarno-Hatta
Susi Air	Dabo, Letung, Tambelan

== Statistics ==
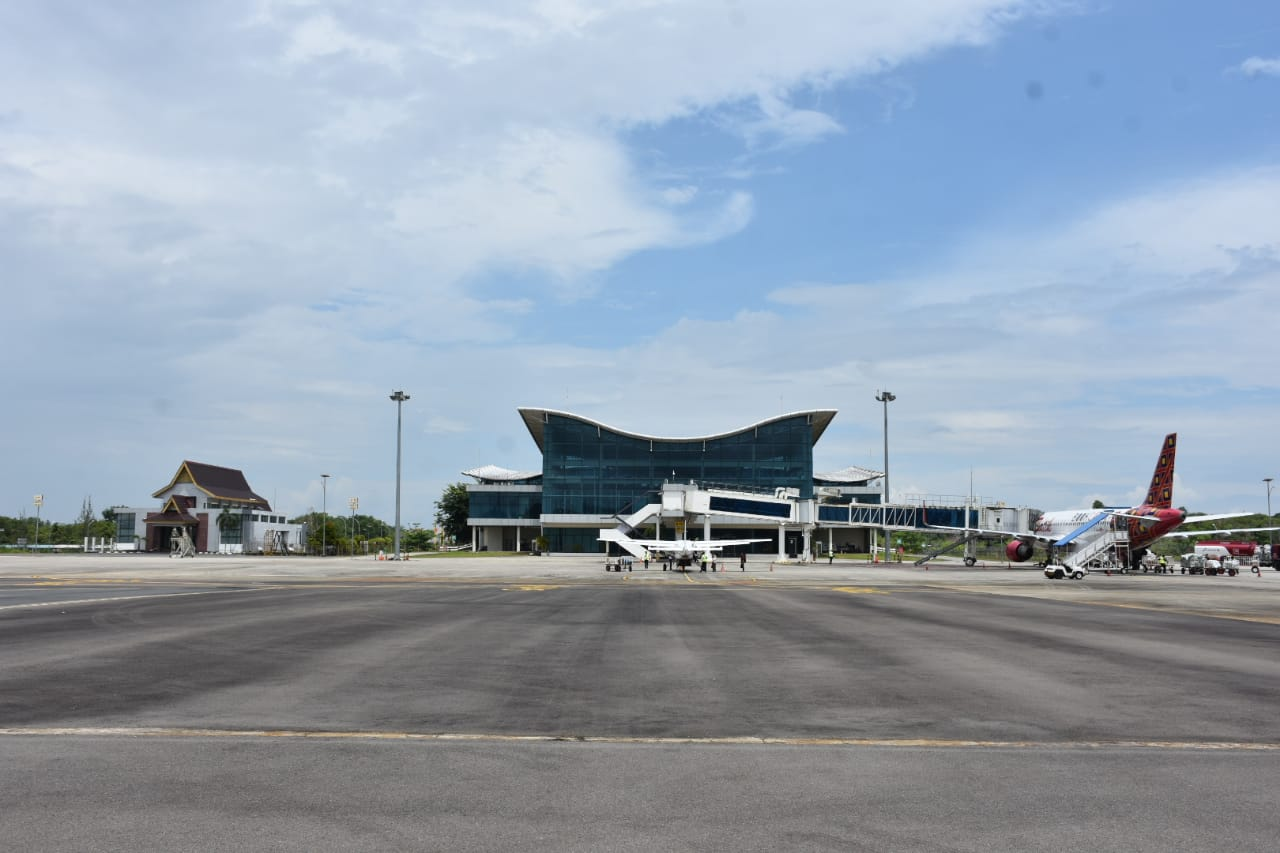
Apron view of Raja Haji Fisabilillah Airport

Annual passenger numbers and aircraft statistics
Year	Passengers handled	Passenger % change	Cargo (tonnes)	Cargo % change	Aircraft movements	Aircraft % change
2006	17,991	Steady	N/A	Steady	2,159	Steady
2007	37,405	▲107.91	134.86	Steady	2,521	▲16.77
2008	130,943	▲250.07	940.32	▲597.26	3,318	▲31.61
2009	157,599	▲20.36	1,155.95	▲22.93	3,437	▲3.59
2010	161,409	▲2.42	1,608.45	▲39.15	2,790	▼18.82
2011	231,183	▲43.23	1,596.11	▼0.77	2,931	▲5.05
2012	291,375	▲26.04	1,940.48	▲21.58	3,835	▲30.84
2013	252,501	▼13.34	2,377.06	▲22.50	3,232	▼15.72
2014	265,407	▲5.11	2,742.78	▲15.39	2,662	▼17.64
2015	258,936	▼2.44	2,400.73	▼12.47	2,542	▼4.51
2016	272,397	▲5.20	2,732.44	▲13.82	2,746	▲8.03
2017	351,727	▲29.12	2,803.49	▲2.60	4,446	▲61.91
2018	387,201	▲10.09	3,150.30	▲12.37	5,449	▲22.56
2019	307,614	▼20.55	2,942.13	▼6.61	4,669	▼14.31
2020	120,021	▼60.98	2,988.19	▲1.57	2,435	▼47.85
2021	129,195	▲7.64	5,062.21	▲69.41	3,222	▲32.32
2022	206,873	▲60.12	4,720.44	▼6.75	3,930	▲21.97
2023	230,956	▲11.64	6,162.33	▲30.55	3,390	▼13.74
2024	263,680	▲14.17	8,165.12	▲32.50	4,048	▲19.41
^{Source: DGCA, BPS}

== Accidents and incidents ==
- On 16 April 2025, Garuda Indonesia Flight 288, operating from Jakarta to Tanjungpinang on a Boeing 737-800, experienced a nose gear failure upon landing at Raja Haji Fisabilillah International Airport, with the front wheel detaching on touchdown. None of the 161 occupants were injured, and the aircraft was able to taxi to the terminal; however, flights to and from the airport were disrupted for several hours.
