= Singkep =

Island in Indonesia

Coordinates: 0.5°S 104.416667°E

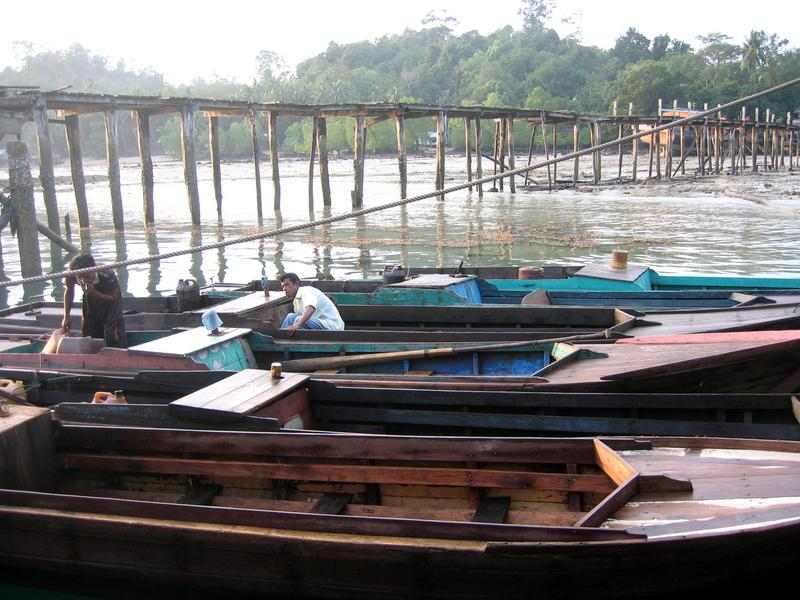
- Singkep island in 2006

Administration
- Indonesia
- Province: Riau Islands
- Regency: Lingga

Singkep is an island in the Lingga Archipelago in Indonesia. Its area is 757 square kilometres (292 sq mi). It is separated from the east coast of Sumatra by the Berhala Strait. It is surrounded by islands Posik to the west, I. Serak to the SW, I. Lalang to the South, and I. Selayar of Riau Islands between Lingga and Singkep.

== Transport ==
Singkep has two ports, Dabo near Dabosingkep and Jago near Sungaibuluh. Service to the port of Muntok on Bangka of Bangka Belitung and Palembang of South Sumatra ceased operating regularly with the demise of the tin mining industry. However, a high-speed ferry continues to connect Tanjung Pinang to Singkep, from where local boats may be chartered to Lingga. Singkep also has a small airport capable of handling small 40 passenger aircraft.

Dabo Airport is located in Dabo, the biggest and main town in Singkep. It was very active during the tin mining operations. It is currently use by charter flights and the government patrol aircraft. Susi Air operates government subsidised passenger flights from Dabo to a variety of destinations, such as Pekanbaru, Batam, Tanjung Pinang, Jambi, and Pangkal Pinang.

== History ==
By secret agreement the Dutch allowed America and Britain access to deposits of thorium on Pulau Singkep in August 1945 which was vital for nuclear processes.

In 1999, the heavy-lift ship Mighty Servant 2 sunk in 35 meters of water near Singkep after striking a solitary, isolated and previously unmapped spire of granite.

== Climate ==
Climate data for Singkep (Dabo Airport, 2012–2020)
Month	Jan	Feb	Mar	Apr	May	Jun	Jul	Aug	Sep	Oct	Nov	Dec	Year
Mean daily maximum °C (°F)	31.5 (88.7)	31.7 (89.1)	32.3 (90.1)	31.9 (89.4)	31.8 (89.2)	31.6 (88.9)	31.2 (88.2)	31.3 (88.3)	31.4 (88.5)	31.4 (88.5)	31.2 (88.2)	31.1 (88.0)	31.5 (88.8)
Mean daily minimum °C (°F)	23.3 (73.9)	23.3 (73.9)	23.4 (74.1)	23.5 (74.3)	23.6 (74.5)	23.6 (74.5)	23.8 (74.8)	23.7 (74.7)	23.7 (74.7)	23.5 (74.3)	23.2 (73.8)	23.3 (73.9)	23.5 (74.3)
Average precipitation mm (inches)	82.2 (3.24)	125.8 (4.95)	120.3 (4.74)	238.6 (9.39)	260.0 (10.24)	234.0 (9.21)	243.8 (9.60)	212.0 (8.35)	201.0 (7.91)	200.2 (7.88)	260.5 (10.26)	250.4 (9.86)	2,428.8 (95.63)
Average precipitation days	9.6	8.2	10.1	15.1	16.2	13.2	13.8	12.0	11.1	14.3	18.6	18.0	160.2
Source: Meteomanz
