= David Constantijn Saudale Airport =

David Constantijn Saudale Airport Bandar Udara David Constantijn Saudale
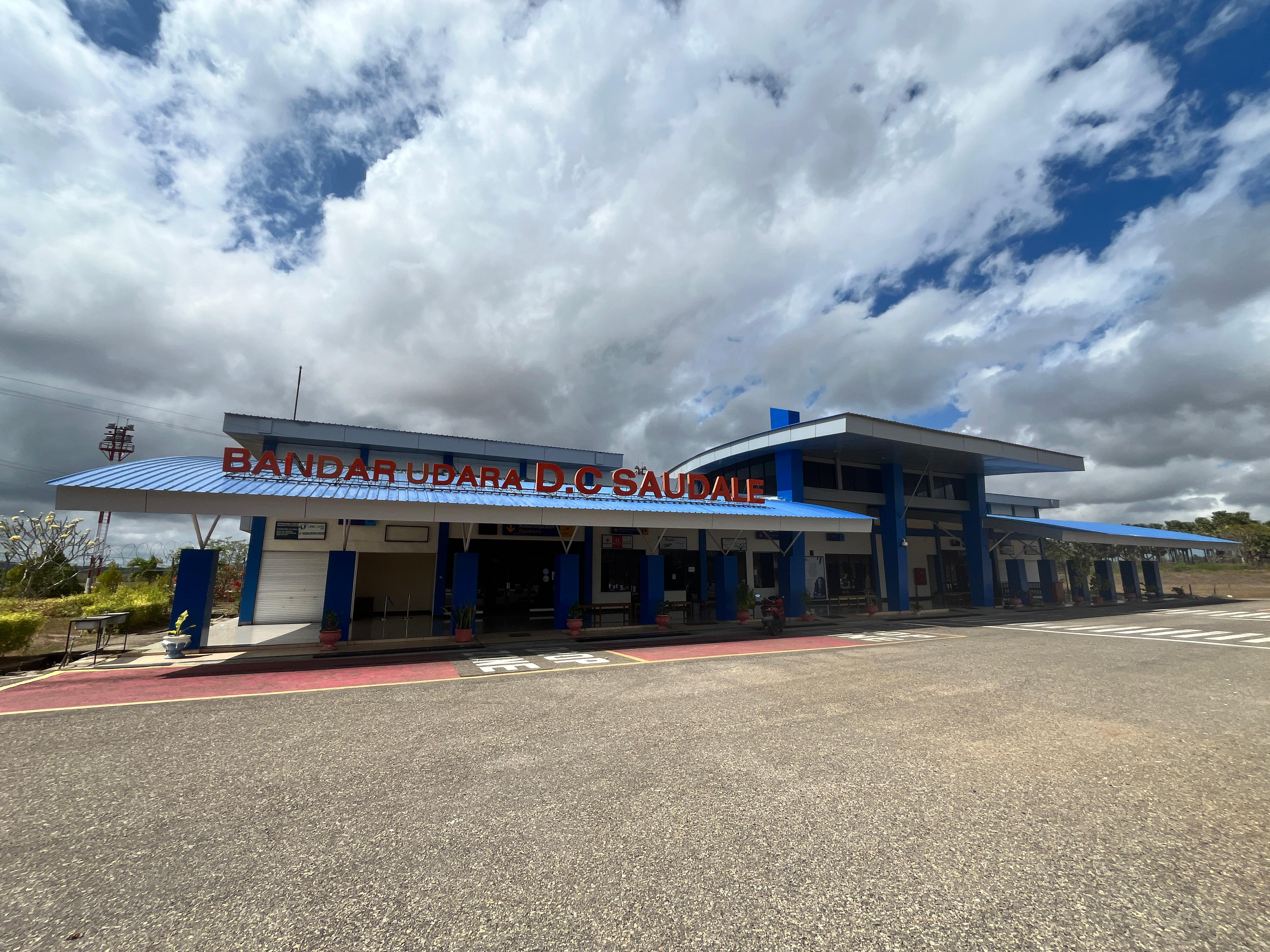
- IATA: RTI; ICAO: WATR

Summary
- Airport type: Public
- Owner: Government of Indonesia
- Operator: Directorate General of Civil Aviation
- Serves: Ba'a
- Location: Rote Ndao Regency, East Nusa Tenggara, Indonesia
- Time zone: WITA (UTC+08:00)
- Elevation AMSL: 463 ft (141 m)
- Coordinates: 10.766964°S 123.074957°E

Map
- Location of the airport in the Lesser Sunda Islands

Runways
Direction	Length		Surface
Direction	ft	m	Surface
04/22	5,413	1,650	Asphalt

Statistics (2024)
- Passengers: 4,245 (▲26.75%)
- Cargo (tonnes): 0.02 (▼98.75%)
- Aircraft movements: 616 (▲24.44%)
- Source: DGCA

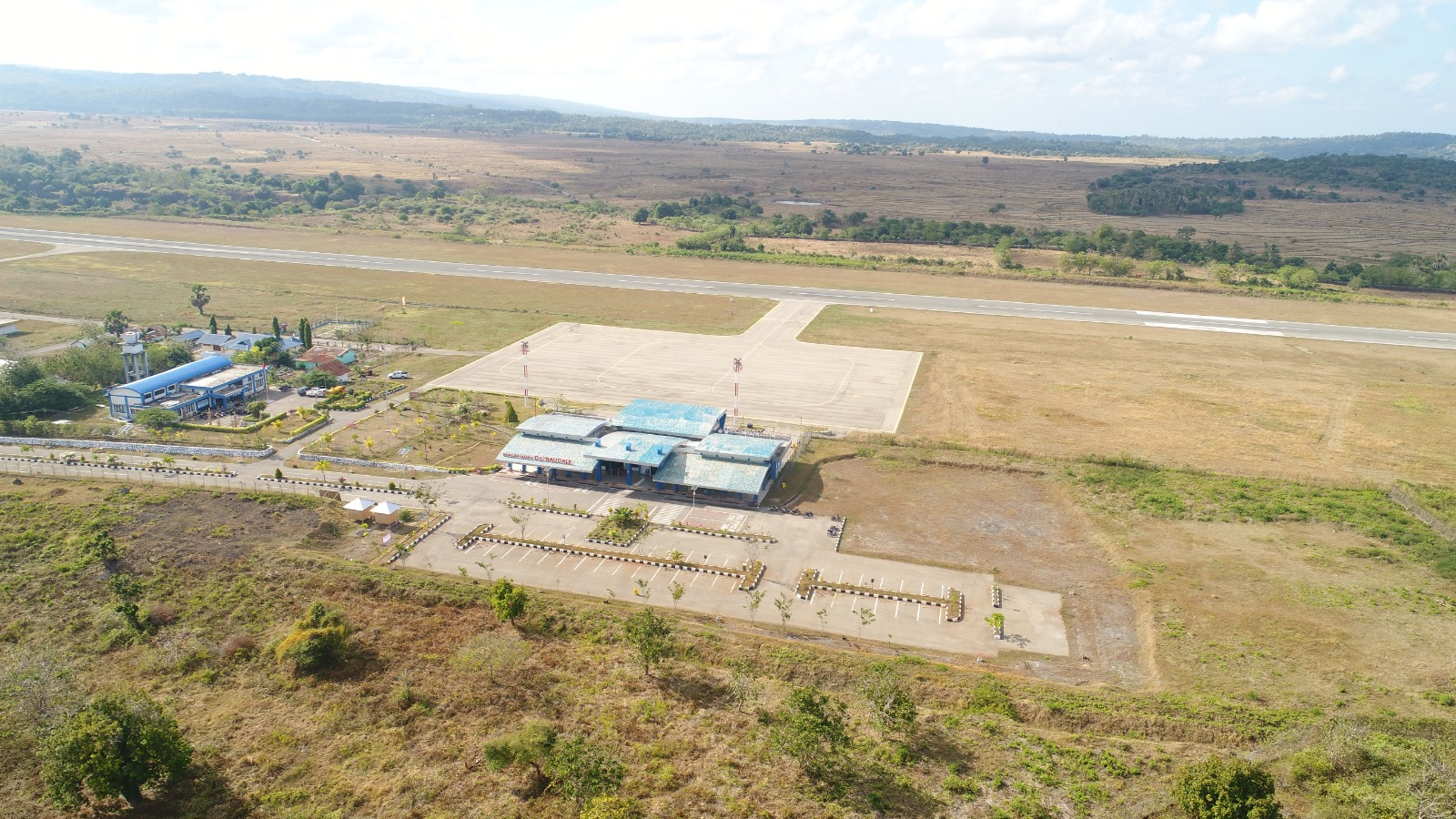
Aerial view of the airport

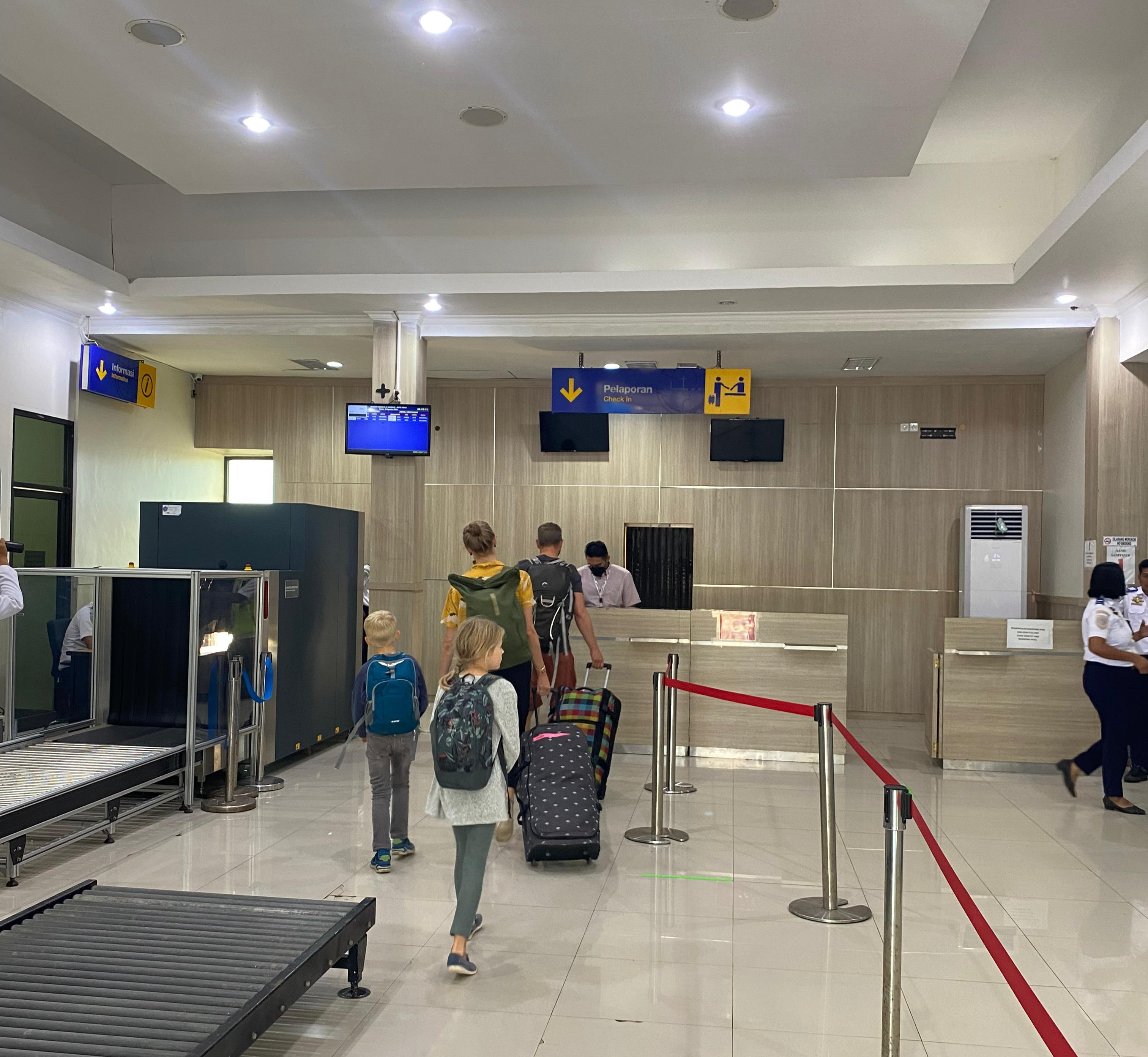
Check-in area

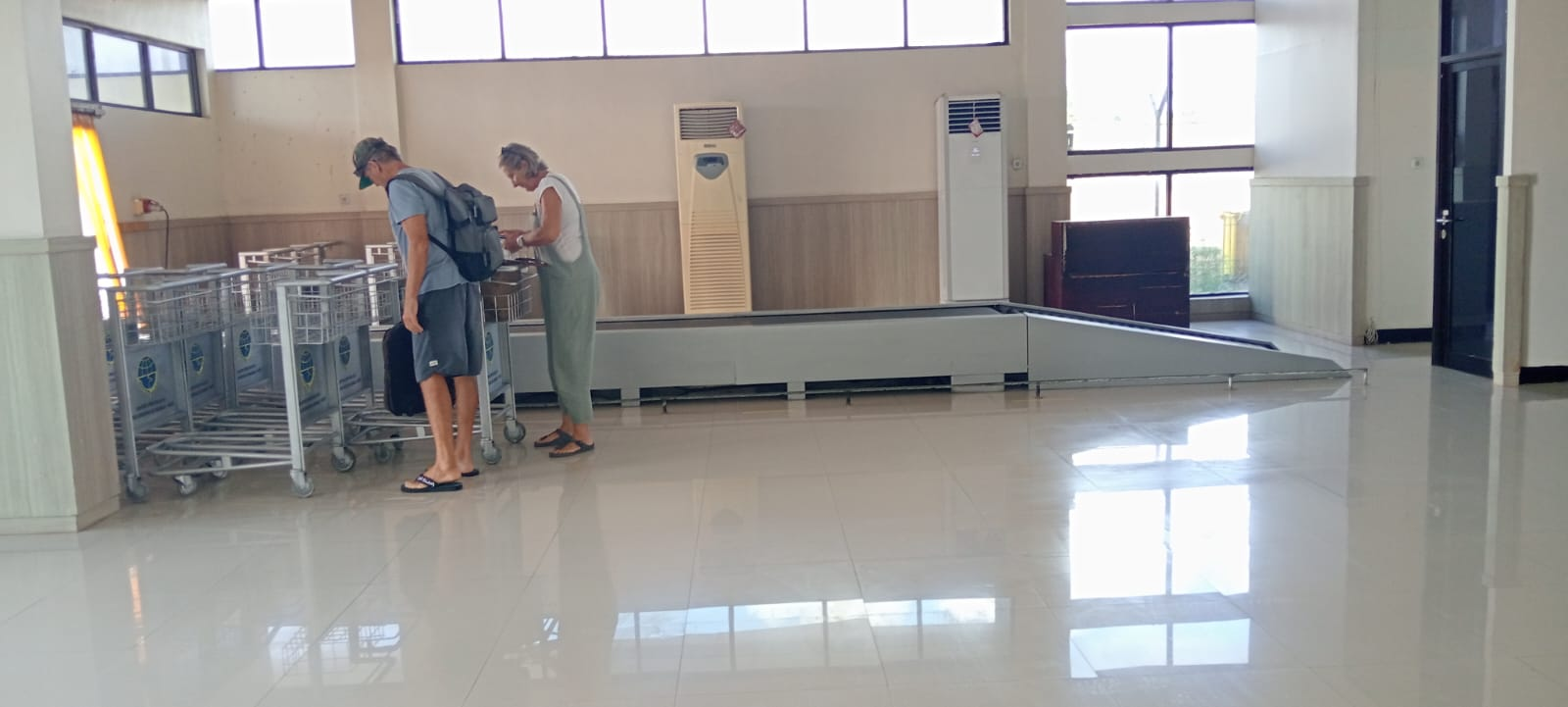
Baggage claim area

David Constantijn Saudale Airport (IATA: RTI, ICAO: WATR), formerly known as Lekunik Airport, is a domestic airport serving Ba'a, the capital of Rote Ndao Regency in East Nusa Tenggara province, Indonesia, and the largest town on Rote Island. The airport is regarded as Indonesia’s southernmost airport and holds strategic importance due to its proximity to the Australia–Indonesia border, which is located just south of Rote. It is named after David Constantijn Saudale, the first regent of Rote Ndao Regency, in recognition of his contributions to both the airport’s construction and the development of the region, while its former name is derived from the village in which it is located. Situated approximately 5 km (3.1 miles) from Ba'a town center, it is the only airport on Rote Island and serves as a primary point of entry to the island. Currently, the airport operates flights to only two destinations: Kupang, the capital and largest city of East Nusa Tenggara, and Savu Island. These routes are served by Susi Air and Wings Air.

== History ==
Prior to the construction of the airport, access to Rote Island was limited to sea transportation. Residents traveling to Kupang, the provincial capital, had to rely on boats. At the time, increasing missionary activities on the island prompted local communities to propose the development of an airport to improve accessibility. To support the construction of the airport, the local rajas (traditional chiefs) of Rote allocated portions of their land for its development.

Lekunik Airport began construction in 1969 under the leadership of David Constantijn Saudale, who was then serving as a special representative of the regent of Kupang Regency for Rote (koordinatorschap)—of which Rote was formerly a part—prior to the formation of Rote Ndao Regency in 2002. He mobilized local communities to support the project, reflecting strong local initiative in its development. The airport was completed and officially began operations in 1976, initially featuring a runway measuring 900 m × 27 m. The first aircraft to land at the airport was a Douglas DC-3 Dakota carrying missionaries to Rote. Following its inauguration, the airport began serving pioneer flights to the island.

In 2010, the airport was renamed to its current name in honor of David Constantijn Saudale, recognizing his contributions to the airport’s construction as well as his broader role in the development of Rote.

Currently, flights to Rote are very limited, with only two routes—Kupang and Savu Island—served by Wings Air and Susi Air. To boost tourism, there are plans to introduce additional routes to major destinations such as Labuan Bajo, Alor, and Sumba.

== Facilities and development ==
The airport features a runway measuring 1,650 m × 30 m, along with a 75 m × 17 m taxiway and an apron of 120 m × 85 m. It is capable of accommodating small aircraft such as the ATR 72. The passenger terminal covers an area of 1,170 square meters. Supporting facilities include an operational complex comprising office buildings, a Non-Directional Beacon (NDB) navigation facility, a workshop, an air traffic control (ATC) tower, a PKP-PK (Aircraft Rescue and Firefighting) building, and a PH building.

The airport is scheduled for further development in the coming years. The total land required for the expansion is 64.60 hectares; however, only 51.40 hectares are currently available, leaving 13.20 hectares yet to be acquired by the local government. This additional land is planned for terminal parking facilities and access roads. To support the development, the government allocated a budget of Rp 49,160,428,000 in 2018. The funding is intended for runway resurfacing, interior terminal renovations, drainage improvements, construction of operational buildings, road upgrades, and other supporting infrastructure.

== Airlines and destinations ==
Airlines	Destinations
Susi Air	Kupang, Savu
Wings Air	Kupang

== Statistics ==
Annual passenger numbers and aircraft statistics
Year	Passengers handled	Passenger % change	Cargo (tonnes)	Cargo % change	Aircraft movements	Aircraft % change
2006	5,633	Steady	29.45	Steady	250	Steady
2007	1,171	▼79.21	0.47	▼8.40	46	▼81.60
2008	632	▼46.03	0.53	▲12.77	16	▼65.22
2009	2,031	▲221.36	3.14	▲492.45	76	▲375.00
2010	2,217	▲9.16	0.74	▼76.43	218	▲186.84
2011	1,506	▼32.07	2.44	▲229.73	180	▼17.43
2012	2,986	▲98.27	67.67	▲2673.36	162	▼10.00
2013	3,337	▲11.75	N/A	Steady	288	▲77.78
2014	4,887	▲46.45	0.93	Steady	372	▲29.17
2015	25,002	▲411.60	0.13	▼86.02	572	▲53.76
2016	41,729	▲66.90	0.65	▲400.00	758	▲32.52
2017	45,062	▲7.99	46.95	▲7123.08	996	▲31.40
2018	67,131	▲48.97	40.10	▼14.59	1,367	▲37.25
2019	54,931	▼18.17	18.78	▼53.17	1,009	▼26.19
2020	28,712	▼47.73	15.82	▼15.76	598	▼40.73
2021	25,066	▼12.70	29.19	▲84.51	928	▲55.18
2022	19,800	▼21.01	26.94	▼7.71	589	▼36.53
2023	3,349	▼83.09	1.60	▼94.06	495	▼15.96
2024	4,245	▲26.75	0.02	▼98.75	616	▲24.44
^{Source: DGCA, BPS}
