= Cornelis Feoh =

Indonesian politician (1963–2021)

Cornelis Feoh (4 October 1963 – 3 January 2021) was an Indonesian politician and member of the Golkar Party of East Nusa Tenggara. Feoh, who was from Rote Island in Rote Ndao Regency, served in the East Nusa Tenggara Regional People's Representative Council (DPRD) from 2019 until his death in office on January 3, 2021.

== Biography ==
Feoh was born on Rote Island on 4 October 1963. He was a longtime Golkar politician in Rote. Cornelis Feoh was first elected to the Kupang Regency legislature (DPRD) for five years. (At the time, Kupang Regency included Feoh's home island of Rote). However, in 2002 Rote Islands was split from Kupang Regency to form the new Rote Ndao Regency. Feoh returned to Rote, where he was elected to the Rote Ndao DPRD, or regency legislature, for three consecutive terms from 2004 until 2019.

In 2019, Feoh was elected to the East Nusa Tenggara Regional People's Representative Council (DPRD) representing District 2, which includes parts of Kupang Regency, Rote Ndao Regency, and Sabu Raijua Regency in the Savu islands. His term would have lasted from 2019 until 2024, but Feoh died in office in January 2021.

Feoh, who had been ill for several months, died at his home in Kupang, East Nusa Tenggara, on 3 January 2021, at the age of 57. He was survived by his wife, Adri Floriana Sui.
