= Lake Undun =

Lake in Indonesia

Undun
- Danau Undun (Indonesian)
- Location within Indonesia
- Location: Landu Leko District, Indonesia
- Coordinates: 10°30′56″S 123°22′1″E
- Basin countries: Indonesia
- Surface area: 6,388 ha (15,790 acres)

Undun (Indonesian: Danau Undun) is a lake on the Indonesian island of Roti in the province of East Nusa Tenggara, in the Lesser Sunda Islands.

== Geography ==
The Undun located in the district Landu Leko (in the Rote Ndao Regency) on the peninsula Tapuafu, which forms the northern part of the island of Roti. To the west is the greater salt lake Usipoka. The nearest town is Kupang.

== Fauna ==
Only on Undun and Oendui, the lake located to the south of Usipoka, can one find the last extant population of Chelodina mccordi roteensis, a subspecies of the Roti Island snake-necked turtle. The range of the subspecies is confined only to this area due to severe persecution and is also here close to extinction. Researchers are urgently demanding a reserve, for example, on the peninsula Tapuafu that includes Lakes Usipoka, Undun and Oendui and the surrounding, untouched wetlands of Tanjung Pukuwatu. Since this area has a high biodiversity, it is possible undescribed species could be found in this area.

The area also contains endemic birds and is possibly an important stopover place for migratory birds such as the Australian pelican.
