= El Tari Airport =

Airport in Kupang, East Nusa Tenggara, Indonesia

El Tari Airport Bandar Udara El Tari
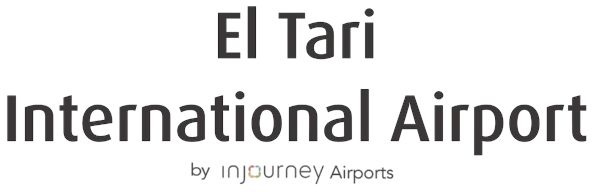

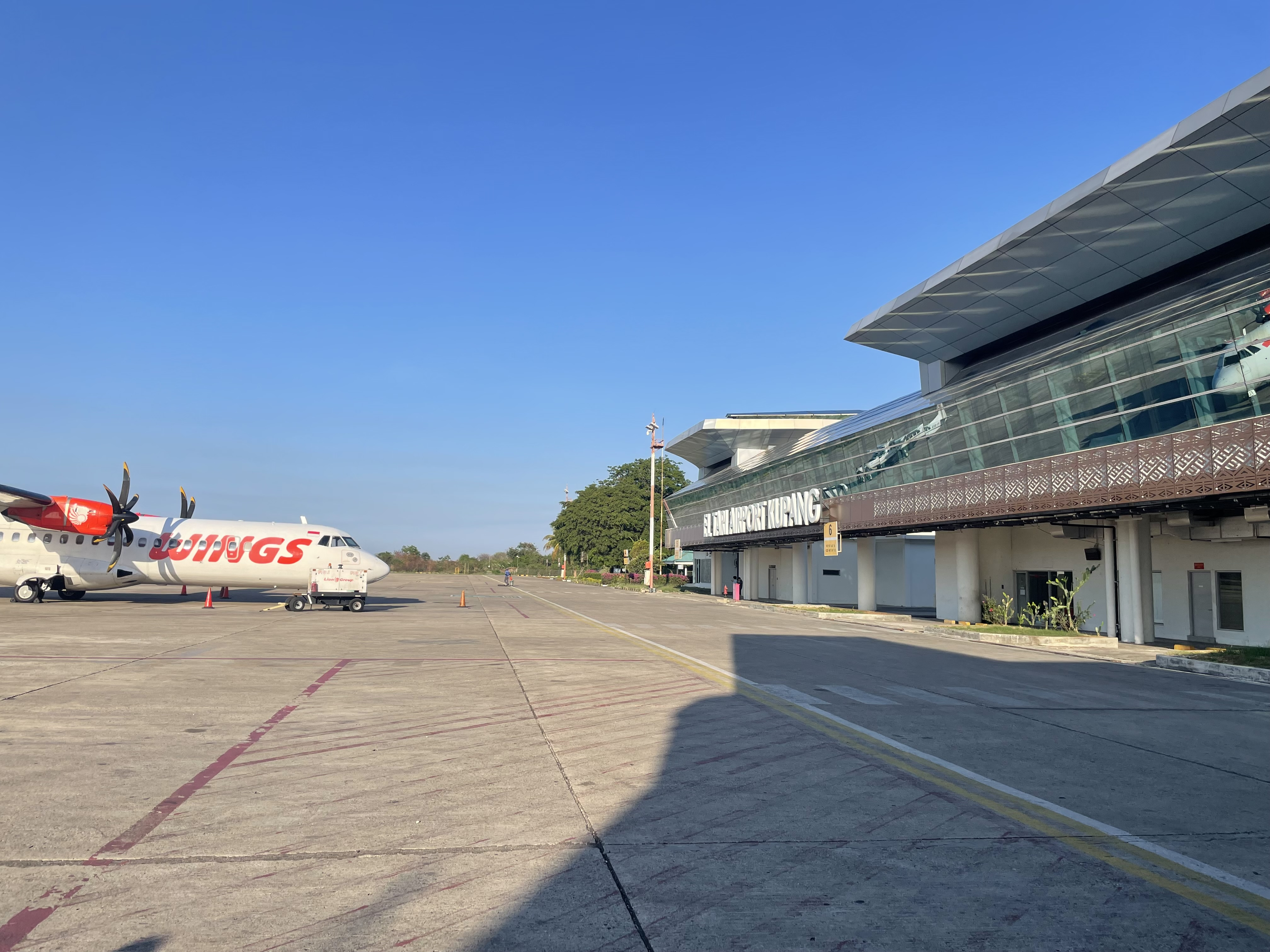
- IATA: KOE; ICAO: WATT; WMO: 97372

Summary
- Airport type: Public / Military
- Owner: Government of Indonesia
- Operator: InJourney Airports
- Serves: Kupang
- Location: Kupang, Timor, East Nusa Tenggara, Indonesia
- Operating base for: Wings Air
- Time zone: WITA (UTC+08:00)
- Elevation AMSL: 105 m (344 ft)
- Coordinates: 10°10′17″S 123°40′16″E
- Website: www.kupang-airport.com

Map
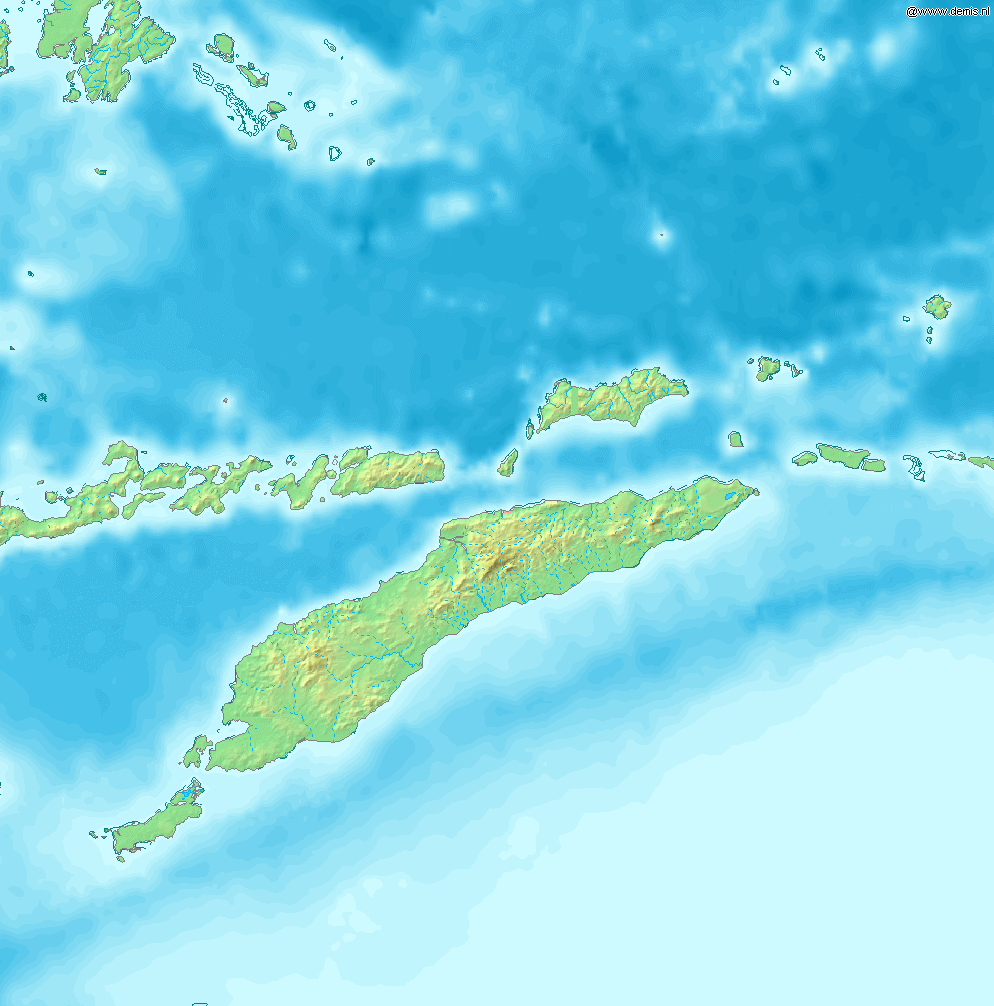
- Location in Timor Location in Indonesia KOE (Southeast Asia) KOE (Asia)

Runways
Direction	Length		Surface
Direction	m	ft	Surface
08/26	2,500	8,202	Asphalt

Statistics (2024)
- Passengers: 1,202,306 (▼7.4%)
- Cargo (tonnes): 12,187 (▲7.3%)
- Aircraft movements: 13,724 (▼14.5%)
- Source: DGCA

El Tari Airport (IATA: KOE, ICAO: WATT) — formerly Penfui Airport — is an airport in Kupang on the island of Timor in the province of East Nusa Tenggara, Indonesia. The airport is named after Elias "El" Tari (1926-1978), an Indonesian Army officer from Savu who also served as the governor of East Nusa Tenggara from 1966 to 1978. The airport's ICAO code was changed from WRKK to WATT in 2004. As of December 2018, there were at least 258 outbound flights per week from the airport.

The airport serves as the main gateway to West Timor and East Nusa Tenggara, offering flights to major Indonesian cities such as Jakarta and Surabaya, as well as inter-provincial routes within East Nusa Tenggara. The airport previously also operated international flights to Dili in East Timor and Darwin in Australia. In addition to serving civilian flights, the airport also functions as a Type A military airbase for the Indonesian Air Force and also as a base for the Indonesian Navy's Naval Aviation Center (Puspenerbal). Its strategic location near the Australian and East Timorese borders makes it a crucial military asset. Plans are underway to establish new squadrons of combat aircraft for the Indonesian Air Force, which will be headquartered in Kupang to enhance border security.

== History ==
=== Construction and early history ===
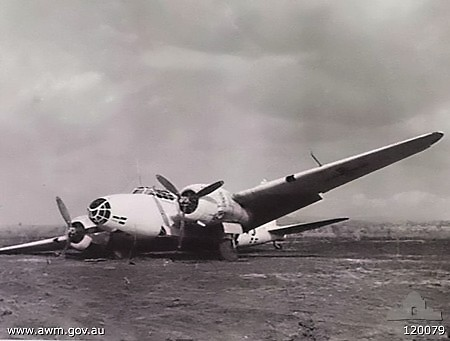
Damaged Japanese Mitsubishi Ki-21 in Penfui Airfield, 1945

The airport has been in operation since 1928, during the Dutch colonial period. At that time, an aircraft piloted by American aviator Lamij Johnson became the first to land at the airfield, making a transit stop before continuing on to Australia. The airport was originally named Penfui Airfield. The word Penfui itself means "corn forest," derived from the Timorese words "pena" meaning "corn" and "fui" meaning "forest." The name reflected the area surrounding the airfield at the time, which was largely planted with corn.

Between 1939 and 1941, the airfield was upgraded and developed by Australian forces in anticipation of a potential Japanese invasion of the Dutch East Indies. Its strategic proximity to Australia made it a valuable asset to the Allied forces during World War II. Following the Japanese attack on Pearl Harbor, a small Australian force known as Sparrow Force arrived at Kupang on 12 December 1941 and was deployed at Penfui Airfield. The airfield also became a vital link between Australia and American forces fighting in the Philippines under Douglas MacArthur. Penfui was attacked by Japanese aircraft on 26 and 30 January 1942; however, the raids were hindered by British anti aircraft defenses and, to a lesser extent, by Curtiss P-40 Warhawk fighters of the 33rd Pursuit Squadron, eleven of which were based in Darwin.

On 19 February 1942, Japanese forces landed at Kupang, marking the beginning of the Battle of Timor with the objective of capturing Penfui Airfield. Five Type 94 tankettes were deployed to support the advancing infantry, which moved north, cutting off Dutch positions in the west and attacking the 2/40th Battalion at Penfui. Sparrow Force was ordered to destroy the airfield to prevent it from falling into Japanese hands; however, the order was not carried out, and the troops instead abandoned the airfield and withdrew to Camplong. The Japanese subsequently captured Penfui intact, quickly repaired it, and brought it into operation to support their war effort.

Within days of its capture, Penfui Airfield was converted into a naval air base for the 3rd Naval Air Squadron of the Imperial Japanese Navy Air Service (IJNAS). The Japanese recognized that the airfield had previously served as a key transit point on the route between Java and Australia—initially for reinforcing Allied forces in Java, and later for evacuating personnel to Australia. Throughout the war, the Japanese used the airfield to launch air raids against northern Australia, including the major attack on Broome on 3 March 1942, which involved nine Mitsubishi A6M2 Zero fighters and a Mitsubishi C5M2 reconnaissance aircraft. Allied forces sought to curb Japanese air raids on Australia by repeatedly targeting Penfui Airfield. One notable strike occurred on 2 December, when No. 31 Squadron RAAF conducted a raid that destroyed 18 Japanese aircraft without suffering any losses.

The Japanese remained at the airfield until 11 September 1945, when the entire Japanese garrison in Timor surrendered to Australian forces stationed there. Control of the airfield was subsequently returned to the Dutch authorities.

=== Contemporary history ===
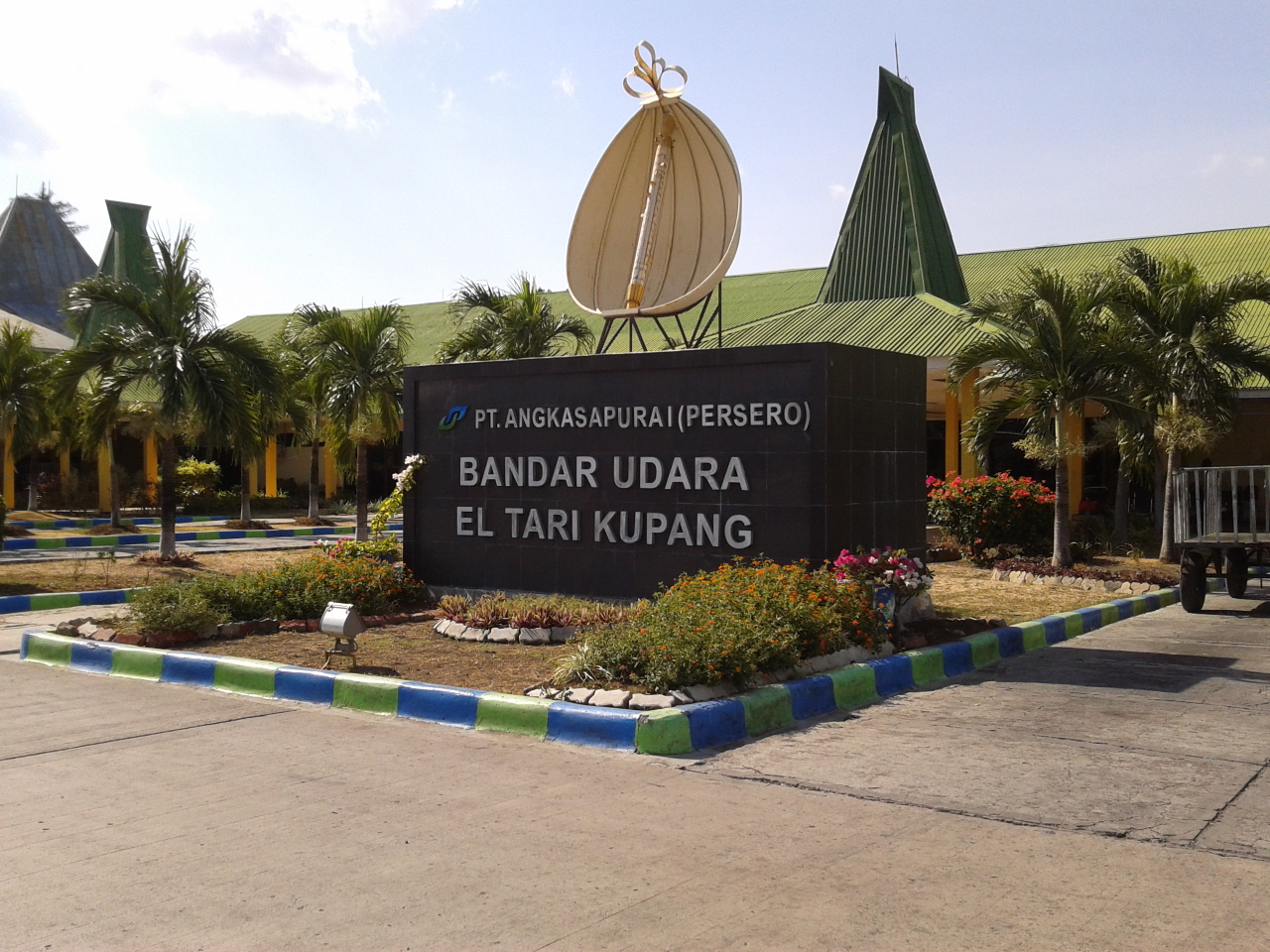
The former terminal in 2012, now demolished

Following the Round Table Conference in 1949, Penfui Airfield was officially handed over by the Dutch military to the Government of Indonesia on May 6, 1950.

With growing demand for air travel in the 1960s, the airfield began accommodating Garuda Indonesia's DC-3 aircraft. At that time, flight operations and air traffic management were overseen by the Indonesian Air Force, as a dedicated civil aviation authority had not yet been established.

During the buildup to Operation Seroja—the Indonesian invasion of East Timor in December 1975—Penfui Airfield served as a forward base for the Indonesian Air Force, supporting preparations for the airborne assault. Indonesian paratroopers were stationed at the airfield before being deployed to the front lines.

In 1988, the airport was officially renamed to its current name, in honor of Elias Tari, the second governor of East Nusa Tenggara, who served from 1966 to 1978. Management of the airport was later transferred to Angkasa Pura I in 1999, later rebranded as InJourney Airports.

The airport once served international flights to neighboring countries such as Dili in East Timor and Darwin in Australia. However, the route to Darwin was discontinued in 2008. On April 2, 2024, the Ministry of Transportation revoked the airport's international status due to the absence of active international flights. The East Nusa Tenggara government has made efforts to reactivate the Kupang-Darwin route, though these efforts have yet to come to fruition.

In 2025, Ministry of Transportation of Indonesia officially reinstated the international status of the airport. In the same year, the airport announced Wings Air will serve international routes from Kupang to Dili, East Timor and was scheduled to operate in March 2026 by using ATR-72-600 aircraft which marks the resumption of international flight from Kupang airport.

== Facilities and development ==
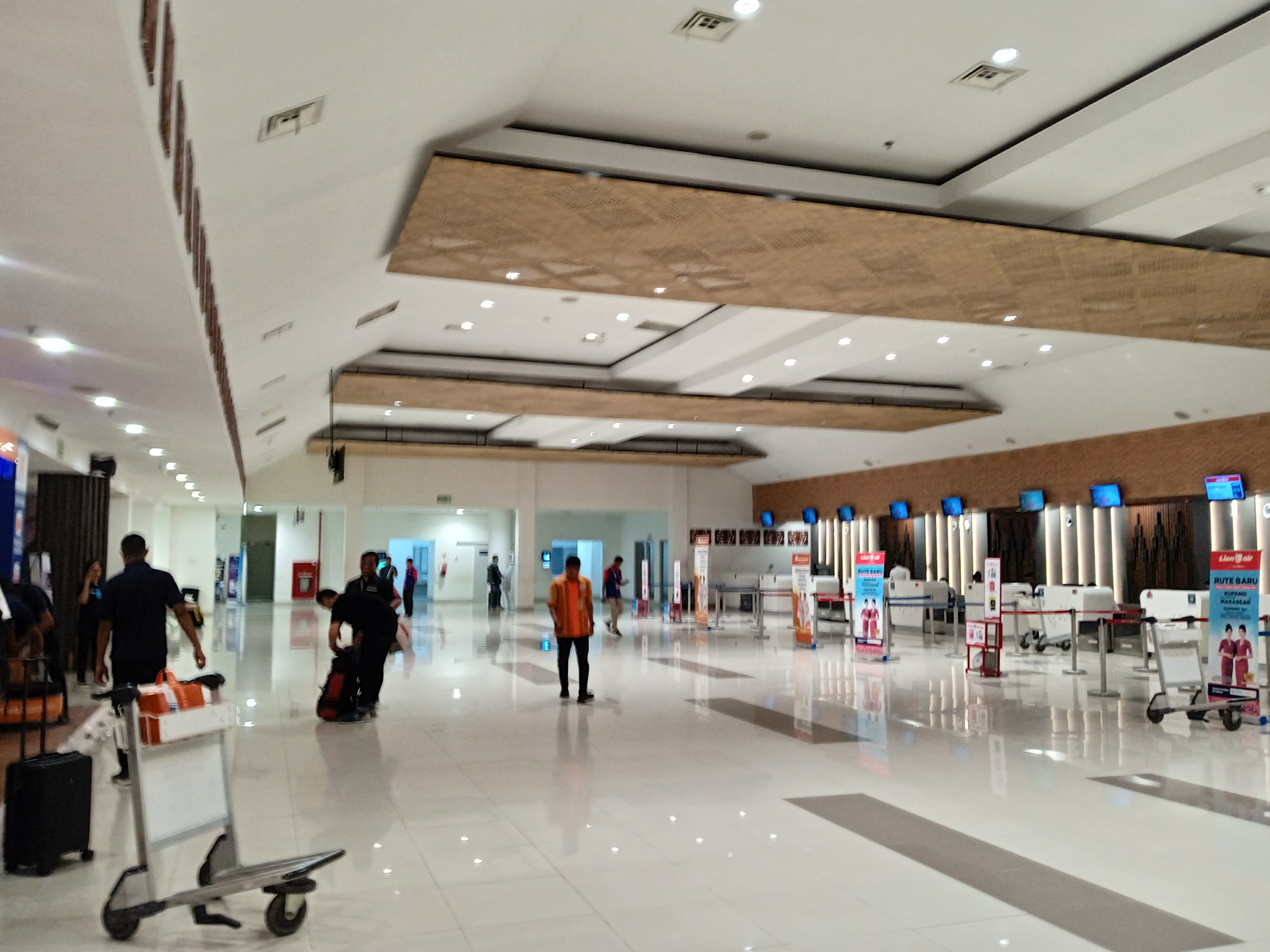
Check-in hall

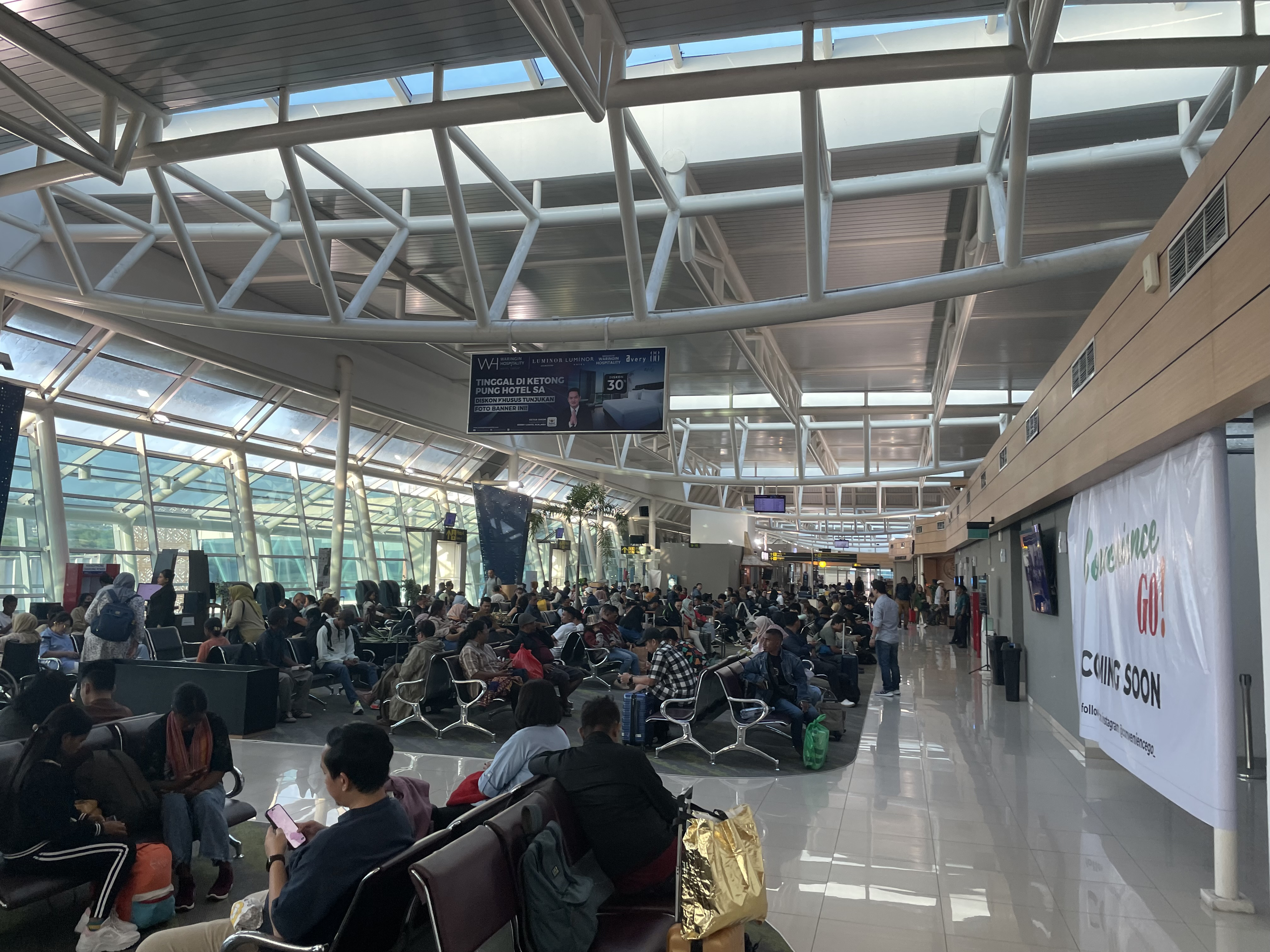
Boarding gate

A major expansion of the airport was completed in 2020 at a cost of approximately 17 billion Rupiah. The project included the construction of a new terminal, an expanded apron, as well as improvements to the runway and lighting.

Following the expansion, the airport now features a passenger terminal spanning 16,424 m², with a capacity to handle up to 2 million passengers annually. Previously, the old terminal had an annual capacity of just 1.3 million passengers. The terminal is equipped with 2 jet bridges, 4 conveyor belts, 20 check-in counters, and offers parking for up to 508 cars and 236 motorcycles. The new terminal building has two floors. The first floor houses the check-in area and arrivals hall, while the second floor, which is equipped with two escalators, serves as the waiting and boarding area. The second floor is divided into separate domestic and international sections. The terminal features a contemporary architectural design that incorporates elements of East Nusa Tenggara's local culture and traditional heritage. The central section of the terminal building is designed to resemble one of the traditional houses found in East Nusa Tenggara, blending modern architecture with local architectural traditions. The terminal is equipped with a fairly complete range of facilities, including toilets, charging stations, a prayer room, and free internet with a reasonably fast connection. There is also a dedicated nursing room. Commercial areas are available near the waiting area and on the outdoor terrace of the airport, offering amenities such as souvenir shops and food outlets.

On the airside, the aircraft apron was rebuilt and expanded as part of the airport's development, increasing its area to 58,469 m² (629,500 sq ft) and allowing it to accommodate up to 17 narrow-body aircraft, including the Boeing 737 and Airbus A320. Previously, the old apron, which covered only 42,525 m² (457,700 sq ft), could accommodate up to 12 narrow-body aircraft. The airport has a single 2,500 m × 45 m (8,202 ft × 148 ft) runway capable of accommodating wide-body aircraft, such as the Airbus A300 and Airbus A330, as well as larger narrow-body aircraft such as the Boeing 737-900ER. The runway is also equipped with two Runway End Safety Areas (RESAs), one measuring 90 m × 90 m (295 ft × 295 ft) and the other 120 m × 90 m (394 ft × 295 ft). In addition, the airport has two taxiways connecting the runway to the apron, each measuring 202.5 m × 23 m (664 ft × 75 ft).

=== New airport ===
El Tari Airport currently has very limited room for further expansion, as much of the surrounding land is owned by the Indonesian Air Force, with which it shares air traffic. As a result, proposals have been put forward to build a new, larger international airport in Kupang to replace El Tari Airport. One proposed site is Oebelo in Central Kupang District, Kupang Regency, approximately 25 km from the city center. The 700-hectare site in Oebelo Village was considered suitable for replacing El Tari Airport because of its strategic location. Situated along the shore of Kupang Bay, the site would provide favorable conditions for aircraft maneuvering during takeoff and landing. Its location would also provide convenient access for prospective passengers from various parts of Timor Island. In addition to Oebelo, the government identified two other potential sites for the construction of the proposed international airport: an 800-hectare site in Tablolong, West Kupang District, and a 600-hectare site in Sulamu, Sulamu District.

== Airlines and destinations ==
=== Passenger ===
Airlines	Destinations
Batik Air	Denpasar, Jakarta–Soekarno-Hatta
Citilink	Jakarta–Soekarno-Hatta
Garuda Indonesia	Jakarta–Soekarno-Hatta
Lion Air	Jakarta–Soekarno-Hatta, (Note: Jakarta–Soekarno-Hatta is the continuation of Surabaya flight with the same flight number.) Makassar, Surabaya
NAM Air	Maumere, Tambolaka
Super Air Jet	Denpasar
Susi Air	Pantar, Rote, Savu
Wings Air	Atambua, Bajawa, Ende, Kalabahi, Labuan Bajo, Larantuka, Lewoleba, Maumere, Rote, Ruteng, Tambolaka, Waingapu

== Statistics ==
Annual passenger numbers and aircraft statistics
Year	Passengers handled	Passenger % change	Cargo (tonnes)	Cargo % change	Aircraft movements	Aircraft % change
2006	484,831	Steady	2,662	Steady	9,243	Steady
2007	573,466	▲18.3	3,617	▲35.9	11,482	▲24.2
2008	726,886	▲26.8	4,575	▲26.5	11,108	▼3.3
2009	826,195	▲13.7	3,209	▼29.9	10,831	▼2.5
2010	932,825	▲12.9	2,904	▼9.5	14,660	▲35.4
2011	1,213,508	▲30.1	4,148	▲42.8	18,800	▲28.2
2012	1,356,573	▲11.8	4,716	▲13.7	19,964	▲6.2
2013	1,369,432	▲0.9	5,918	▲25.5	20,481	▲2.6
2014	1,310,970	▼4.3	5,258	▼11.2	18,555	▼9.4
2015	1,523,342	▲16.2	4,885	▼7.1	20,253	▲9.2
2016	1,942,065	▲27.5	5,279	▲8.1	24,679	▲21.9
2017	2,099,890	▲8.1	6,088	▲15.3	26,638	▲7.9
2018	2,250,427	▲7.2	7,422	▲21.9	30,186	▲13.3
2019	1,859,268	▼17.4	8,778	▲18.3	25,870	▼14.3
2020	1,032,286	▼44.5	9,319	▲6.2	16,630	▼35.7
2021	1,020,285	▼1.2	12,352	▲32.5	15,546	▼6.5
2022	1,247,927	▲22.3	13,030	▲5.5	15,642	▲0.6
2023	1,297,850	▲4.0	11,355	▼12.9	16,045	▲2.6
2024	1,202,306	▼7.4	12,187	▲7.3	13,724	▼14.5
^{Source: DGCA, BPS}

== Accidents and incidents ==
- On 27 November 2009, Batavia Air Flight 711, operated by a Boeing 737-400 made an emergency landing after a problem was discovered with the landing gear. The crew and passengers on board remained unhurt.
- On 2 December 2009, Merpati Nusantara Airlines Fokker 100 PK-MJD made an emergency landing when the left main gear failed to extend. There were no injuries among the passengers and crew on board.
- On 10 June 2013, Merpati Nusantara Airlines Flight 6517, a Xian MA60 operated by Merpati Nusantara Airlines suffered a structural failure and crashed on the runway after a hard landing. No one was killed in the crash, but 25 people were injured. 5, including the Captain, was seriously injured. An investigation by the NTSC found that the pilot moved the throttle to the way back, causing the aircraft to lose lift. The crash was the second hull loss of a Xi'an MA60 operated by Merpati.
- On 21 December 2015 a Kalstar Aviation Embraer ERJ-195 PK-KDC operating a flight from Ende to Surabaya via Kupang overshot the runway at El Tari Airport in Kupang.
