= Landu Leko =

Landu Leko District Kecamatan Landu Leko
- Location within Indonesia
- Coordinates: 10°33′37″S 123°18′52″E
- Country: Indonesia
- Province: East Nusa Tenggara
- Regency: Rote Ndao
- Established: 2012
- Capital: Daeurendale
- Postal code: 85974
- ISO 3166 code: ID-NT

Landu Leko is an Indonesian district (kecamatan) in the Rote Ndao Regency, East Nusa Tenggara province. It was split off from the district Rote Timur in 2012.

== Geography ==
Landu Leko is located in the northeast of the island Roti. To the south lies the district Rote Timur. The district contains the Tapuafu peninsula, the eastern islands of Usu, Nusa Manupui and Boti, and the northern island Nusa Bibi, which lies in the Strait of Roti. The capital is Daeurendale, in the south of Tapuafu. On Tapuafu are two inland lakes, including Lake Undun.
