= H. Hasan Aroeboesman Airport =

H. Hasan Aroeboesman Airport Bandar Udara H. Hasan Aroeboesman
- IATA: ENE; ICAO: WATE

Summary
- Airport type: Public
- Owner: Government of Indonesia
- Operator: Directorate General of Civil Aviation
- Serves: Ende
- Location: East Ende District, Ende Regency, Flores, East Nusa Tenggara, Indonesia
- Time zone: WITA (UTC+08:00)
- Elevation AMSL: 15 m (49 ft)
- Coordinates: 08°50′57″S 121°39′38″E

Map
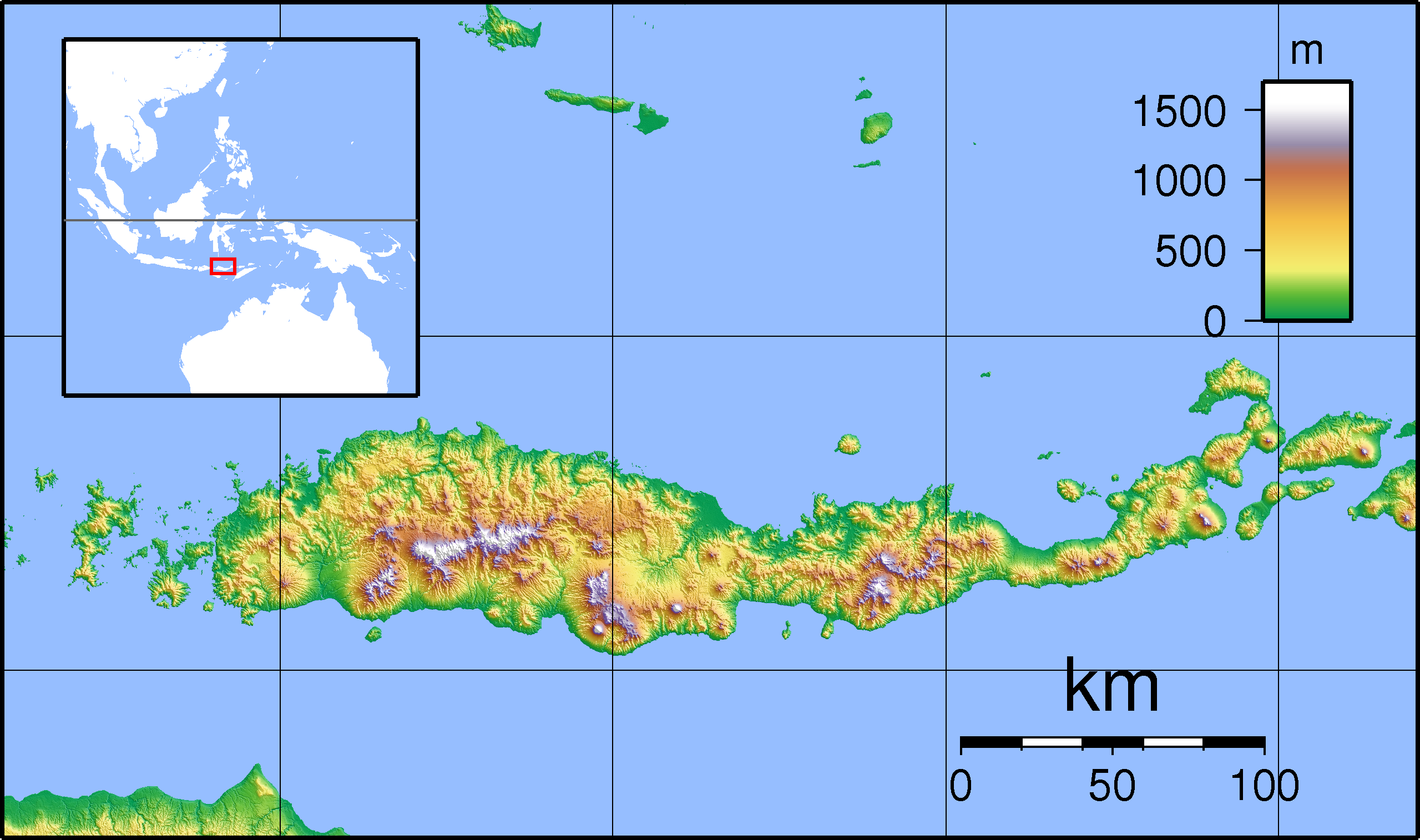
- Location of airport in Flores

Runways
Direction	Length		Surface
Direction	m	ft	Surface
09/27	1,650	5,413	Asphalt

Statistics (2024)
- Passengers: 100,804 (▼17.4%)
- Cargo (tonnes): 247.25 (▼3.3%)
- Aircraft movements: 2,208 (▼16.0%)
- Source: DGCA

H. Hasan Aroeboesman Airport (IATA: ENE, ICAO: WATE), formerly known as Ipi Airport, is a domestic regional airport serving Ende, the administrative capital of Ende Regency on the island of Flores in East Nusa Tenggara, Indonesia. The airport is named after Haji Hasan Aroeboesman, the last Raja of Ende and a former Regent of Ende, who served from 1967 to 1973. Located close to the town center, the airport is approximately 600 m (0.37 mi) from the Ende Regent's Office. It serves as a major gateway to Ende and the surrounding region, as well as to Kelimutu National Park, located approximately 60 km (37 mi) from the airport. The airport is currently served by two airlines. Wings Air operates flights to Kupang, the provincial capital of East Nusa Tenggara, and Labuan Bajo, while Susi Air operates pioneer flights to Savu Island. The airport previously had direct flights to Denpasar, Bali, but the route has since been discontinued.

The airport is surrounded by the sea and mountainous terrain, making it one of the more challenging airports in Indonesia for pilots. Aircraft are required to make a sharp turn of approximately 90 degrees shortly after takeoff or before landing due to the presence of a mountain only a few kilometers from the end of the runway. As a result, flights to and from the airport are generally operated by experienced pilots familiar with the airport's demanding approach and departure procedures.

== History ==
=== Construction and early history ===
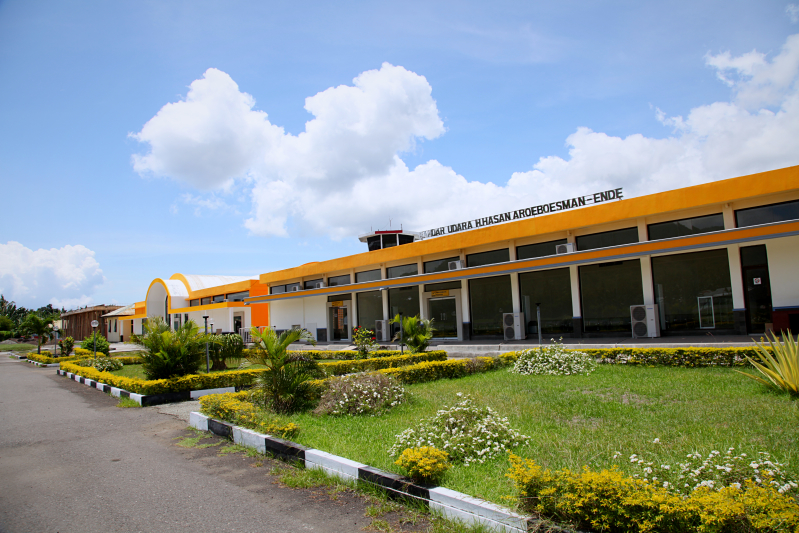
Former terminal of H. Hasan Aroeboesman Airport, 2013

The development of Ende Airport was first proposed in the early 1970s by Haji Hasan Aroeboesman, the first Regent of Ende and the last Raja of Ende. In addition to initiating the project, Aroeboesman played an important role in negotiating with local residents to facilitate the acquisition of land for the airport. At the time, however, the economic and infrastructure conditions in Ende Regency were considerably more difficult than they are today. The local government therefore had to incur debt to finance the land acquisition, which amounted to Rp32 million, a substantial sum at the time. Compensation payments for the land were eventually settled during the administration of Regent Herman Josef Gadi Djou in 1973, over a period of two years, allowing construction of the airport to proceed. The airport was completed between 1974 and 1975 and subsequently designated as a pioneer airfield. Merpati Nusantara Airlines became the first airline to operate scheduled services at the airport, using the de Havilland Canada DHC-6 Twin Otter.

By the 1980s, the government had begun planning the expansion and development of the airport. However, the project encountered several obstacles, particularly difficulties in acquiring additional land. A technical survey conducted by the Directorate General of Civil Aviation concluded that further development of Ipi Airport to accommodate larger aircraft such as the Fokker F27 would be difficult because of a hill located at one end of the runway. In response to growing passenger demand and congestion, air services to the area were instead expanded by increasing the frequency of Twin Otter flights.

By the 1990s, Merpati Nusantara Airlines operated several services to the airport, including flights to Kupang in Timor, the provincial capital of East Nusa Tenggara, as well as an inter-island multi-stop service linking Denpasar, Mataram, Bima, Ruteng, and Ende. Bouraq Indonesia Airlines subsequently began operating flights to Ende in the mid-to-late 1990s. The 1990s also saw the runway extended to 1,400 m, enabling the airport to accommodate Fokker F27 aircraft. In May 1996, a Merpati Fokker F27 landed at the airport as part of a test flight ahead of the introduction of the aircraft type. Around this period, the airport was renamed Haji Hasan Aroeboesman Airport in honor of Haji Hasan Aroeboesman, who played an instrumental role in the airport's construction and development and made significant contributions to the development of Ende.

=== Contemporary history ===
Check-in counters

The 2000s saw new airlines introduce services to Ende. During this period, TransNusa launched flights between Ende and Kupang in partnership with Aviastar and Nusantara Air Charter, operating BAE 146 and Fokker 50 aircraft. In 2010, TransNusa also introduced a direct service between Ende and Denpasar, operated with Aviastar's BAE 146 aircraft, eliminating the need for passengers to transit in Kupang. In the same year, Lion Air's subsidiary Wings Air also launched a Denpasar–Ende service, with onward connections to Jakarta operated by Lion Air.

In December 2013, Garuda Indonesia officially launched its first service to Ende from Labuan Bajo, operated with an ATR 72-600. It subsequently introduced a service between Ende and Kupang. The service continued until the COVID-19 pandemic, before resuming in December 2020, this time operated by Garuda Indonesia's subsidiary Citilink, following the transfer of Garuda Indonesia's ATR 72-600 fleet to Citilink. However, Citilink subsequently terminated the Ende–Kupang route in 2023.

On 15 August 2026, the airport sustained significant damage following a major earthquake that struck Flores. The earthquake damaged the terminal ceiling and caused cracks in the walls of the Airport Rescue and Fire Fighting (PKP-PK) building and the control tower structure. Airport authorities immediately assessed the condition of the facilities and took measures to ensure the safety of passengers and airport personnel. The terminal area was cleared, while air traffic services continued under a contingency plan, with communications relocated to the PKP-PK building's watchroom. Although the airport remained open and flight operations could continue under enhanced safety measures, the damage and temporary disruption to airport facilities affected scheduled services. Several airlines, including Wings Air, suspended flights to the airport as a precaution while inspections and safety assessments were carried out.

== Facilities and development ==
=== Landside facilities ===
Boarding gate

Baggage claim area

A new passenger terminal was completed in January 2023 at a cost of approximately Rp85 billion, funded through the state budget (APBN) and allocated by the Directorate General of Civil Aviation under the Ministry of Transportation. Construction of the new terminal began in 2021 and was completed two years later in 2023. The two-story terminal has a floor area of 4,320 m² (46,500 sq ft) and is designed to accommodate up to 116,153 passengers annually, with its boarding gates capable of accommodating 300–350 passengers during peak periods.

The new terminal features a modern architectural design incorporating elements of local Endenese cultural heritage. The terminal is equipped with a range of passenger facilities, including an exclusive lounge, a dedicated waiting area for passengers with disabilities, a prayer room, a lactation room, and a small and medium-sized enterprise (SME) center. The first floor houses the check-in and arrivals areas, while the second floor contains the departure lounge and food court. The terminal features dedicated departure and arrival areas, check-in facilities, general waiting areas, and a paid lounge designed as an elegant passenger relaxation area. As the terminal occupies two floors, it is equipped with two escalators and a lift, with the latter intended primarily for passengers with disabilities and elderly travelers. The terminal also includes a food court and dining area designed as a casual gathering space, which is open not only to passengers but also to the general public.

=== Airside facilities ===
On the airside, the airport has a single runway measuring 1,650 m × 30 m (5,413 ft × 98 ft), capable of accommodating aircraft up to the size of the ATR 72. The runway is equipped with two runway turn pads, one at each end, each measuring 100 m × 15 m (328 ft × 49 ft). In June 2015, following a visit to the airport, then-Minister of Transportation Ignasius Jonan announced plans to upgrade the airport's facilities, including extending the runway to 1,800 m and eventually to 2,100 m. The proposed extensions were intended to enable the airport to accommodate larger aircraft, including narrow-body types such as the Boeing 737 and Airbus A320. The government initially allocated Rp15 billion in funding for the project, including land clearance. However, the runway extension was shelved in 2022 due to several constraints, including physical limitations, budgetary considerations, and relatively low demand for air transportation. One of the main physical constraints was a hill in the Dolog area, located directly beyond the end of the runway. The hill would have to be excavated along a divergent profile to provide a safe landing approach for larger aircraft.

In addition to the runway, the airport is equipped with three taxiways connecting the runway to the aircraft apron, measuring 30 m × 15 m (98 ft × 49 ft), 35 m × 28 m (115 ft × 92 ft), and 29 m × 28 m (95 ft × 92 ft), respectively. The airport has two aircraft aprons, measuring 220 m × 40 m (722 ft × 131 ft) and 108 m × 40 m (354 ft × 131 ft), respectively.

== Airlines and destinations ==
Airlines	Destinations
Susi Air	Savu
Wings Air	Kupang, Labuan Bajo

== Statistics ==
A Wings Air ATR 72-500 at H. Hasan Aroeboesman Airport

Annual passenger numbers and aircraft statistics
Year	Passengers handled	Passenger % change	Cargo (tonnes)	Cargo % change	Aircraft movements	Aircraft % change
2006	56,163	Steady	81.97	Steady	1,912	Steady
2007	64,812	▲15.4	165.92	▲102.4	1,814	▼5.1
2008	52,548	▼18.9	49.67	▼70.1	2,102	▲15.9
2009	83,745	▲59.4	69.39	▲39.7	2,360	▲12.3
2010	N/A	Steady	N/A	Steady	N/A	Steady
2011	101,433	Steady	94.39	Steady	2,980	Steady
2012	126,364	▲24.6	123.08	▲30.4	2,844	▼4.6
2013	179,240	▲41.8	577.99	▲369.6	4,690	▲64.9
2014	155,083	▼13.5	117.86	▼79.6	4,816	▲2.7
2015	208,284	▲34.3	320.58	▲172.0	5,038	▲4.6
2016	188,483	▼9.5	318.94	▼0.5	5,255	▲4.3
2017	238,750	▲26.7	135.70	▼57.5	5,110	▼2.8
2018	238,486	▼0.1	172.99	▲27.5	5,474	▲7.1
2019	196,144	▼17.8	130.64	▼24.5	4,836	▼11.7
2020	128,828	▼34.3	190.66	▲45.9	3,061	▼36.7
2021	187,021	▲45.2	163.58	▼14.2	3,058	▼0.1
2022	118,240	▼36.8	290.62	▲77.7	2,555	▼16.4
2023	122,024	▲3.2	255.70	▼12.0	2,628	▲2.9
2024	100,804	▼17.4	247.25	▼3.3	2,208	▼16.0
^{Source: DGCA, BPS}
