= Komodo International Airport =

Airport in Labuan Bajo, East Nusa Tenggara, Indonesia

Komodo International Airport Bandar Udara Internasional Komodo
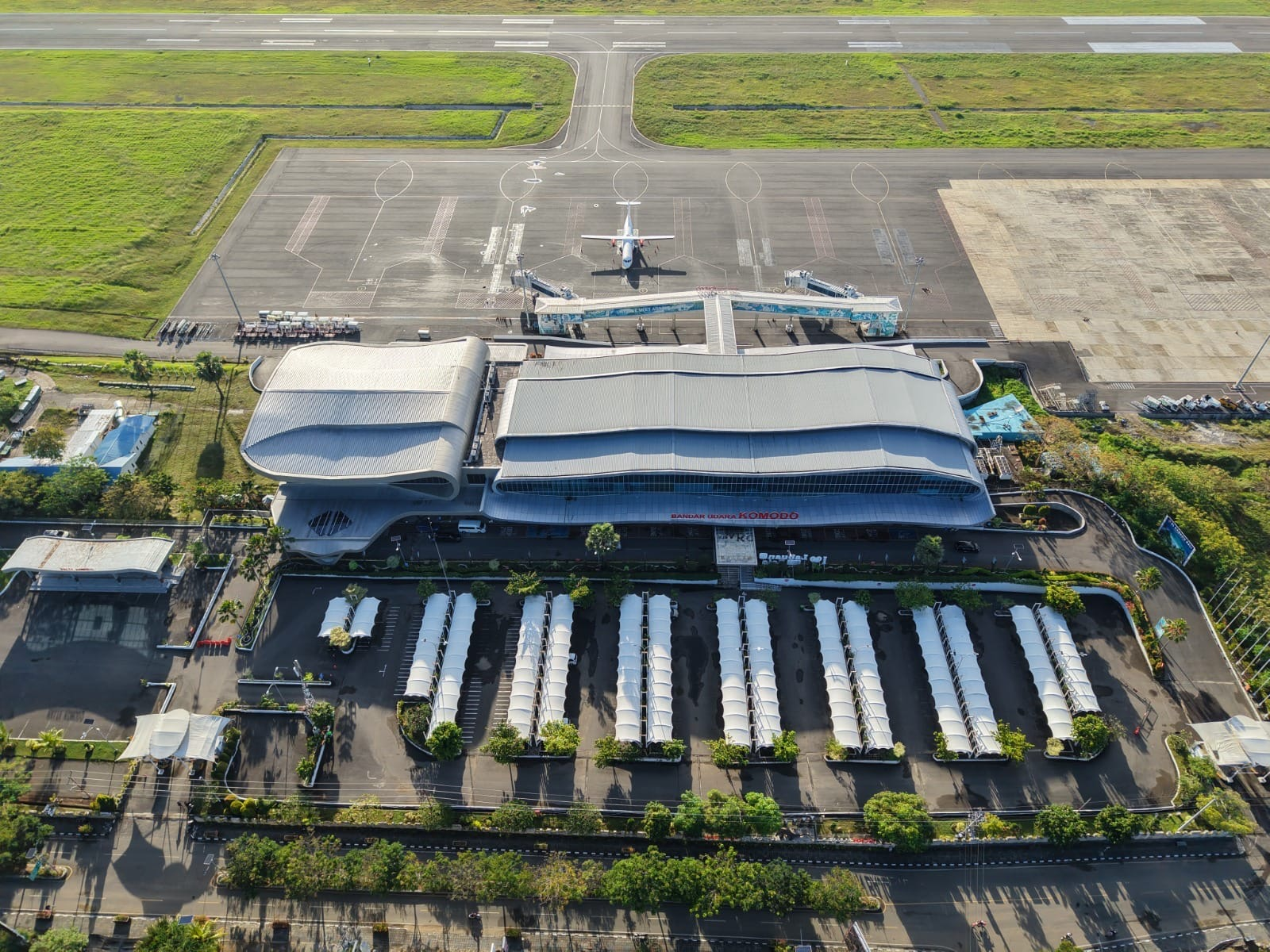
- IATA: LBJ; ICAO: WATO

Summary
- Airport type: Public
- Owner: Government of Indonesia
- Operator: Cardig Aero Services
- Serves: Labuan Bajo
- Location: Labuan Bajo, West Manggarai Regency, Flores Island, East Nusa Tenggara, Indonesia
- Time zone: WITA (UTC+08:00)
- Elevation AMSL: 228 ft (69 m)
- Coordinates: 08°29′12″S 119°53′21″E

Map
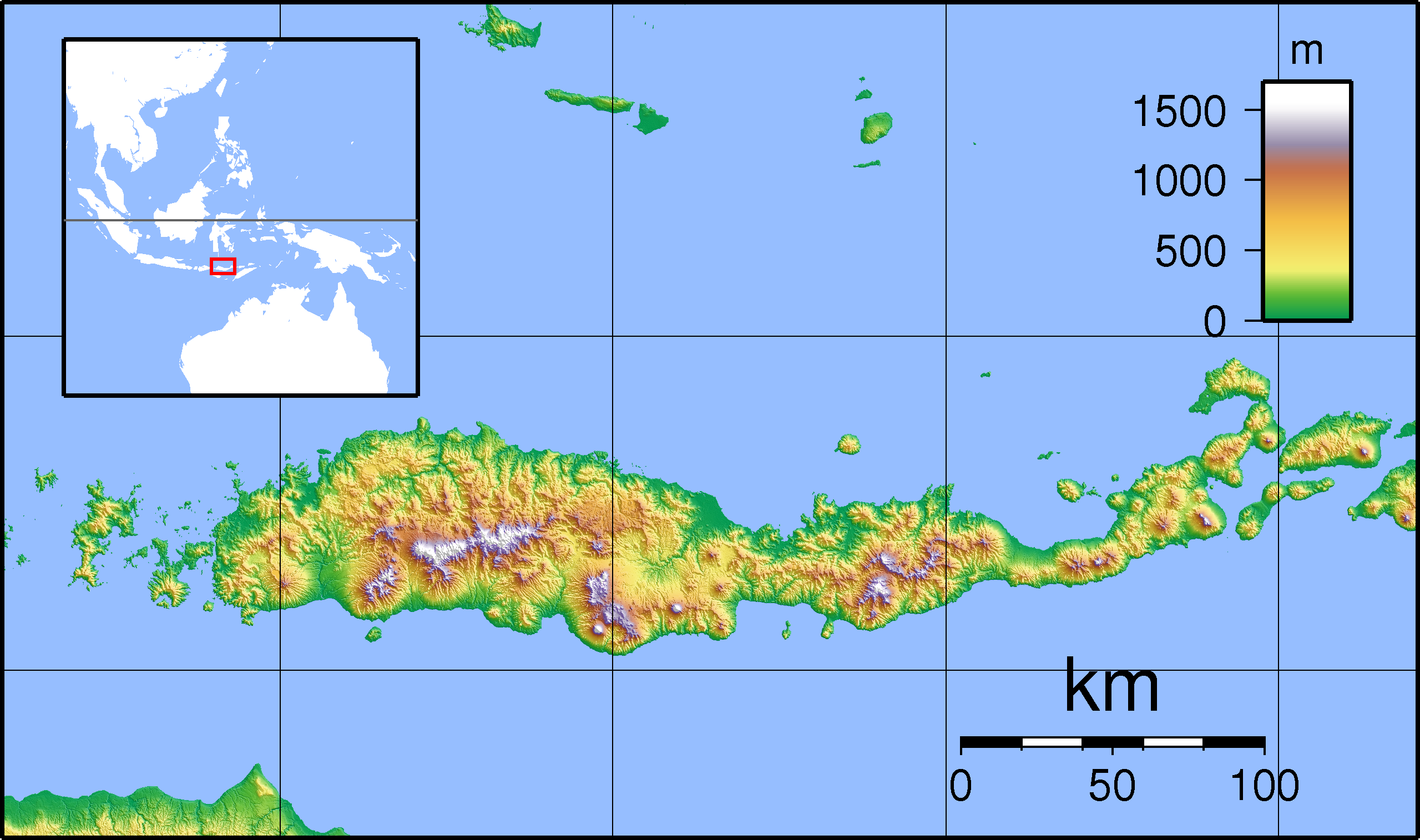
- Location of airport in Flores

Runways
Direction	Length		Surface
Direction	m	ft	Surface
17/35	2,750	9,022	Asphalt

Statistics (2024)
- Passengers: 1,017,995 (▲8.0%)
- Cargo (tonnes): 2,136 (▲22.5%)
- Aircraft movements: 8,372 (▼7.6%)
- Sources: DGCA

Komodo International Airport (IATA: LBJ, ICAO: WATO), formerly known as Mutiara II Airport, is an international airport serving the town of Labuan Bajo, the capital of West Manggarai Regency, located on the western tip of Flores Island in East Nusa Tenggara, Indonesia. Named after the Komodo dragon—an iconic species endemic to the nearby Komodo National Park—the airport functions as the primary gateway to the park and other surrounding tourist destinations. In response to growing passenger demand and the region's increasing popularity as a tourist destination, the airport has expanded its route network. It now offers regular flights to major Indonesian cities such as Jakarta, Surabaya, and Denpasar (Bali), as well as international connections to Kuala Lumpur in Malaysia, and Singapore. The airport also supports regional air travel within Flores, with services to towns including Bajawa, Ende, and Maumere.

== History ==
=== Early history ===
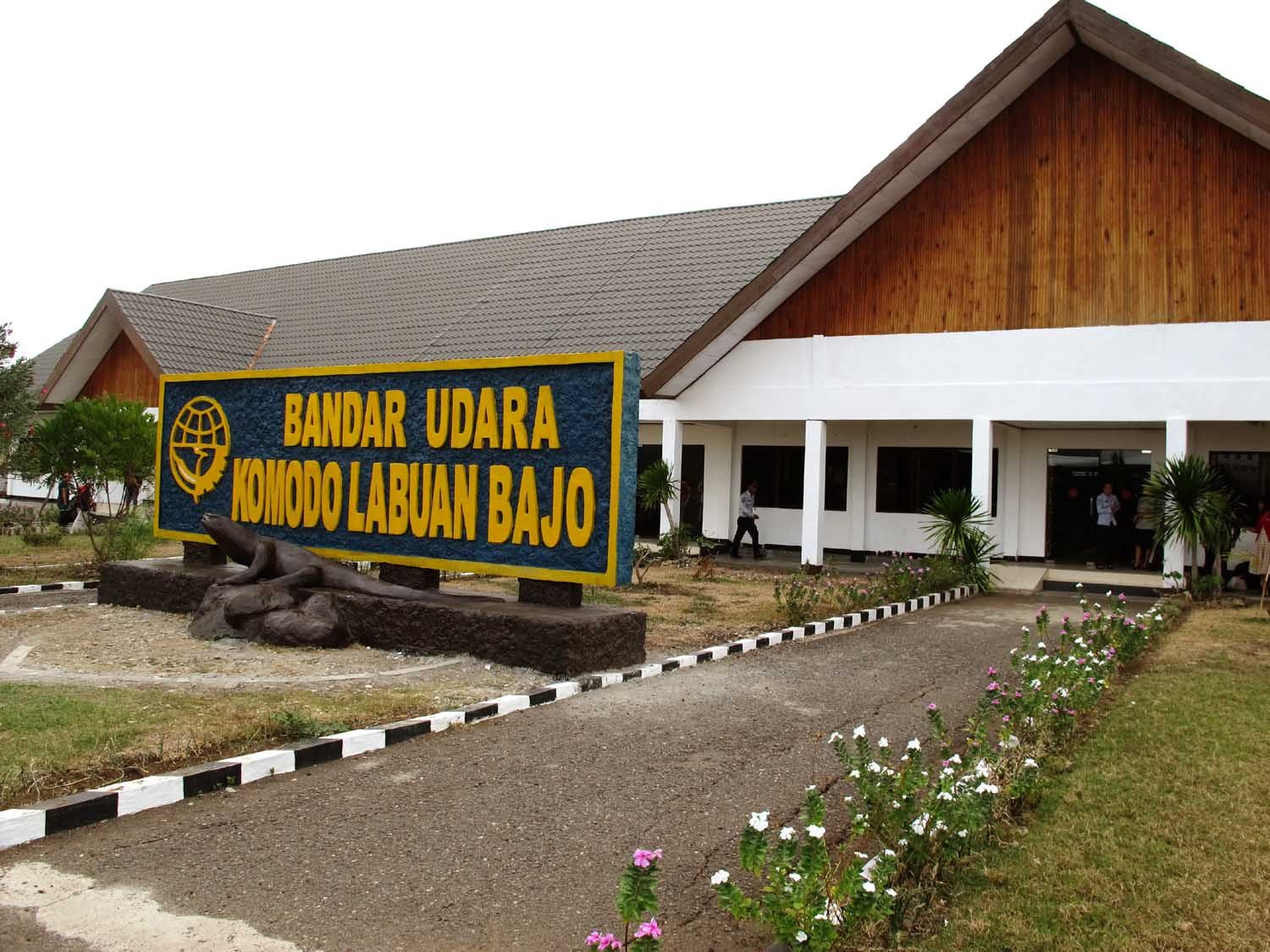
Komodo Airport former terminal building, now demolished

The idea of constructing an airport to serve Labuan Bajo in western Flores emerged in 1970. Komodo Airport was constructed in 1975. Initially, its runway was an unpaved grass strip oriented east–west. Following flight trials, obstacles were identified along the east–west approach, prompting the runway to be reoriented on a north–south alignment. At the time, the airport could accommodate only small aircraft, such as the DHC-6 Twin Otter, which was primarily used for pioneer flights serving remote and rural areas. One of the first airlines to establish scheduled services to the airport was Merpati Nusantara Airlines, which primarily operated pioneering air services to remote and rural areas.

The airport was originally known as Wae Kelambu Airport before being renamed Mutiara II Airfield. It was officially inaugurated in 1980 by Minister of Transportation Rusmin Nuryadin, East Nusa Tenggara Governor Ben Mboi, and Manggarai Regent Frans Sales Lega. In 1986–1987, the runway was reconstructed with flexible pavement by the state-owned construction company Waskita Karya.

As the Komodo National Park and the Komodo dragons became increasingly prominent as a tourist attraction, the local government proposed renaming Mutiara II Airfield. In 1991, the airport was renamed Komodo Airport, a name it has retained since.

By the 1990s, the airport had a modest passenger terminal measuring 240 m², while its 1,200 m × 30 m runway was capable of accommodating light aircraft such as the Cessna and CASA 212. In 2003, the runway was extended by 450 m to 1,650 m × 30 m to accommodate aircraft such as the Xian MA60 and ATR 42. A further 200 m extension was completed in 2007, allowing the airport to accommodate Boeing 737-500 aircraft.

In 2010, the passenger terminal was expanded into a traditional longhouse-style building with a floor area of approximately 1,500 m² and an annual passenger capacity of 35,000.

=== Contemporary history ===
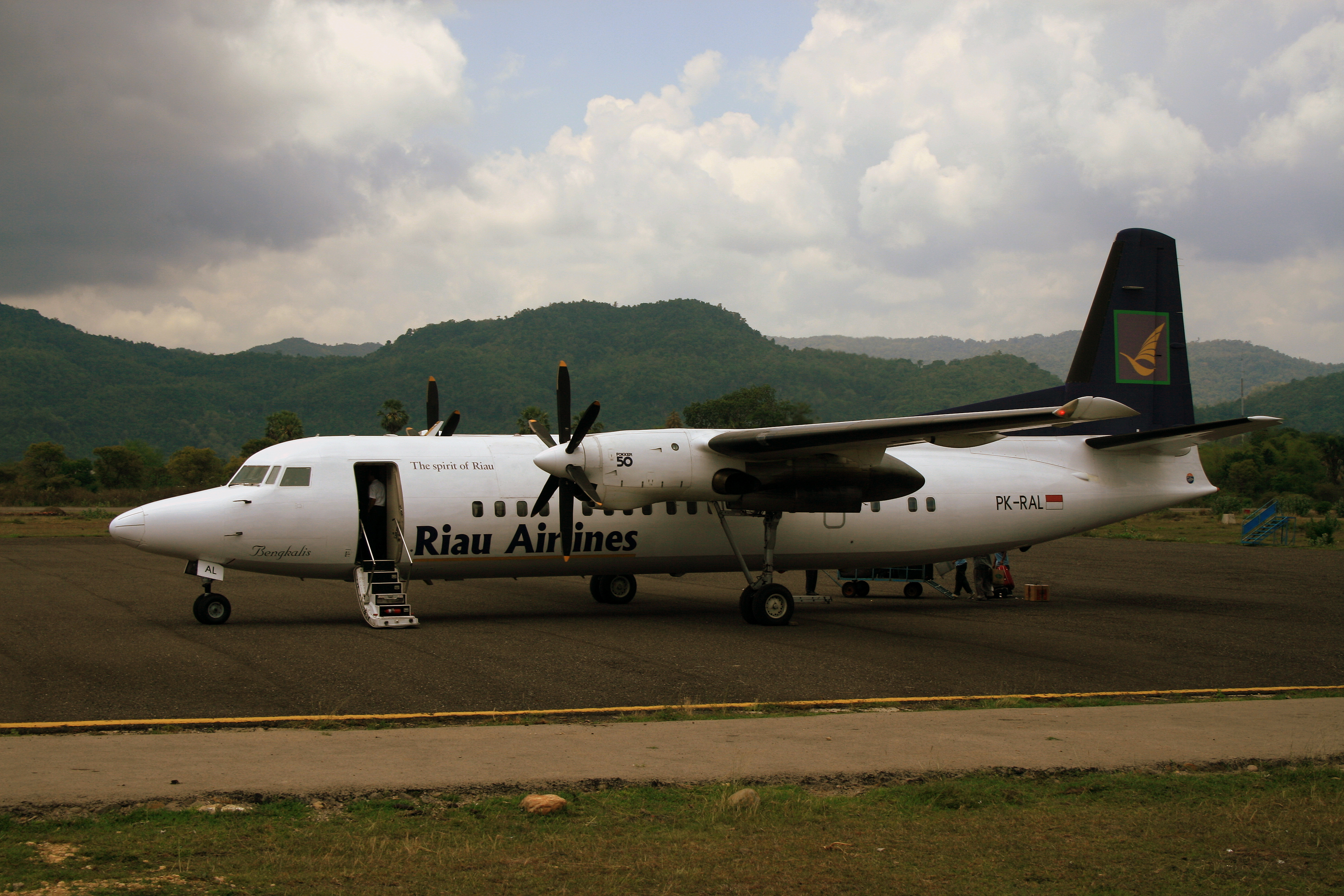
A Riau Airlines Fokker 50 at Komodo Airport, 2008

Major development of the airport began in the early 2010s, including the extension of the runway from 1,850 meters to 2,100 meters, enabling it to accommodate narrow-body aircraft such as the Boeing 737 and Airbus A320. Additional upgrades included the construction of a new passenger terminal and supporting infrastructure. Prior to these improvements, the airport could only serve smaller aircraft such as the Fokker 50 and ATR 72. The first Boeing 737 landed on 13 September 2013—a Garuda Indonesia Boeing 737-800 carrying then-President Susilo Bambang Yudhoyono, who flew from Jakarta to visit Komodo National Park and inaugurate the Sail Komodo 2013 festival.

In 2020, Indonesia's publicly listed air transportation services company PT Cardig Aero Service (CAS Group), in partnership with Changi Airports International (CAI), a subsidiary of Singapore’s Changi Airport Group, won the public-private partnership (PPP) tender for the expansion of Komodo International Airport. The project, valued at approximately Rp 1.2 trillion (US$85.82 million), grants the consortium the right to operate the airport for 25 years, after which control will be transferred to the Directorate General of Civil Aviation under the Ministry of Transportation.

Between 9 and 19 November 2024, Komodo International Airport was temporarily closed due to the eruption of Mount Lewotobi. The closure caused significant disruptions, leading to the cancellation of numerous flights and leaving many passengers stranded.

On 2 April 2024, the Ministry of Transportation officially granted Komodo International Airport international status. Following the status upgrade, the airport commenced its first international service to Kuala Lumpur, Malaysia in September 2024, operated by AirAsia. In March 2025, it launched a second international route to Singapore, operated by Jetstar Asia. Following the cessation of Jetstar Asia's operations, the route was terminated on 31 July 2025 and subsequently taken over by Scoot. Additional international routes are planned for the future, including potential connections to Australia and South Korea.

== Facilities and development ==
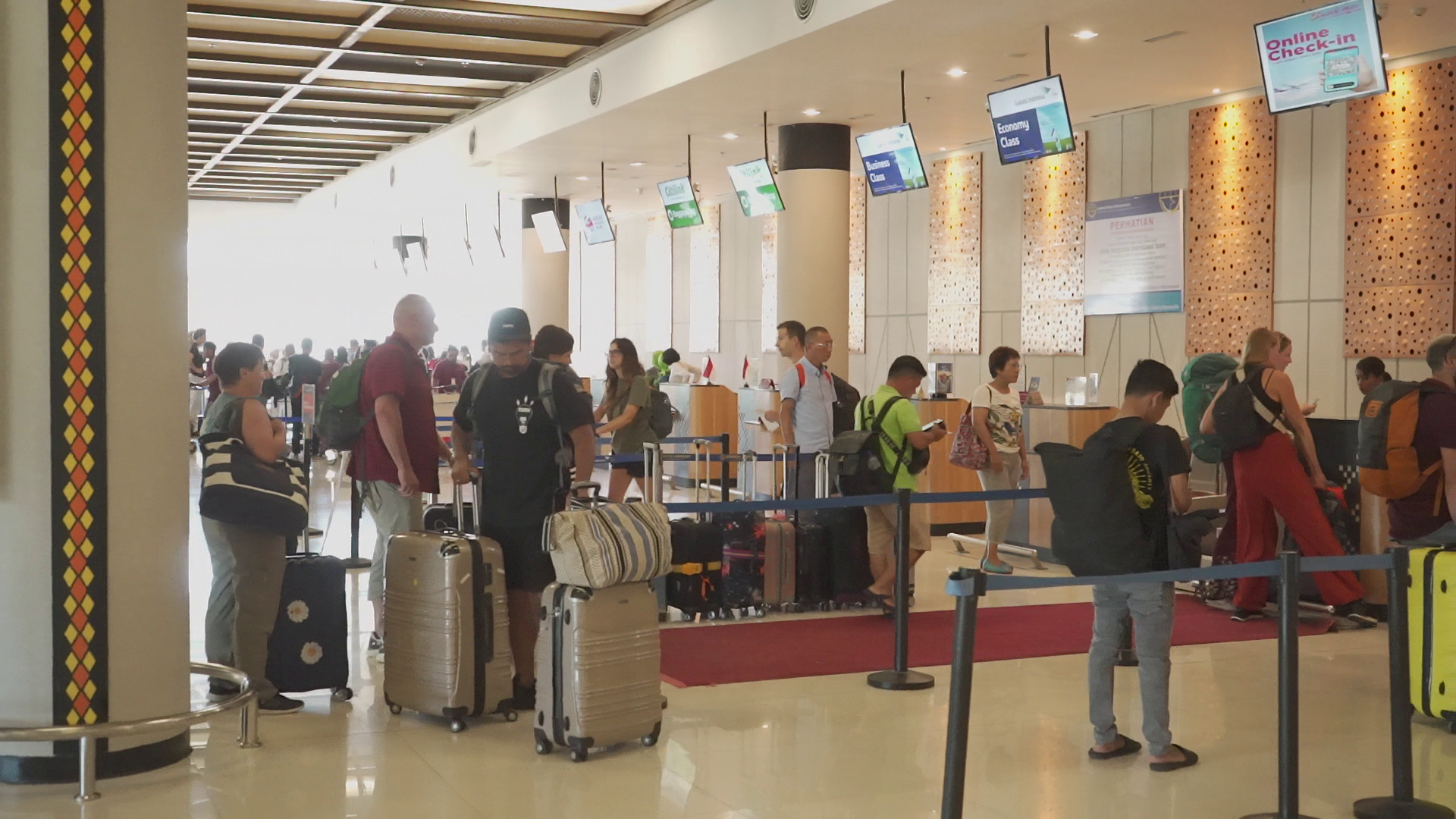
Check-in area

On 27 December 2015, President Joko Widodo inaugurated a new, modern terminal at Komodo Airport. The expanded terminal increased the airport’s capacity to handle up to 1.5 million passengers annually, a substantial rise from the previous capacity of approximately 150,000 passengers per year. This development was expected to significantly boost tourism to Flores Island and its surrounding areas. Additionally, the runway was extended to 2,250 meters in length and 45 meters in width, allowing the airport to accommodate medium-sized jet aircraft such as the Airbus A320 and the Boeing 737 Next Generation series. Prior to this upgrade, the airport could only service smaller aircraft like the ATR 72 turboprop. The government invested a total of 191.7 billion rupiah in the airport’s development.

Following the 2020 takeover of the airport’s management by PT Cardig Aero Service (CAS), a consortium including Changi Airports International Pte Ltd. (CAI) and Changi Airports MENA Pte Ltd., comprehensive development plans were initiated. The airport is projected to accommodate up to 4 million passengers annually. As part of the expansion, the runway will be extended to 2,750 meters, and the apron area will be enlarged to 20,200 square meters. The domestic terminal is planned to be expanded to 6,500 square meters, while a new international terminal covering 5,538 square meters will be constructed, along with a 2,860-square-meter cargo terminal and various supporting facilities. The entire development project is expected to require an investment of approximately 1.2 trillion rupiah.

In 2022, another major expansion of the airport was completed and inaugurated by President Joko Widodo in preparation for the 2022 G20 Summit and the 2023 ASEAN Summit. The expansion included widening the apron to cover an area of 31,000 square meters, providing seven parking stands—four for narrow-body aircraft and three for propeller planes. The runway was extended to 2,650 meters in length and 45 meters in width, while the passenger terminal was expanded to 13,366 square meters. Plans are in place to further extend the runway by an additional 100 meters, reaching 2,750 meters, to accommodate wide-body aircraft such as the Airbus A330.

== Airlines and destinations ==
=== Passenger ===
Airlines	Destinations
AirAsia	Kuala Lumpur–International
Batik Air	Denpasar, Jakarta–Soekarno-Hatta
Citilink	Jakarta–Soekarno-Hatta
Garuda Indonesia	Jakarta–Soekarno-Hatta
Indonesia AirAsia	Denpasar, Jakarta–Soekarno-Hatta
NAM Air	Denpasar (begins 27 November 2026)
Scoot	Singapore
Super Air Jet	Jakarta–Soekarno-Hatta, Surabaya
Susi Air	Waingapu
Wings Air	Bajawa, Ende, Kupang, Lombok, Makassar, Maumere, Tambolaka

== Statistics ==
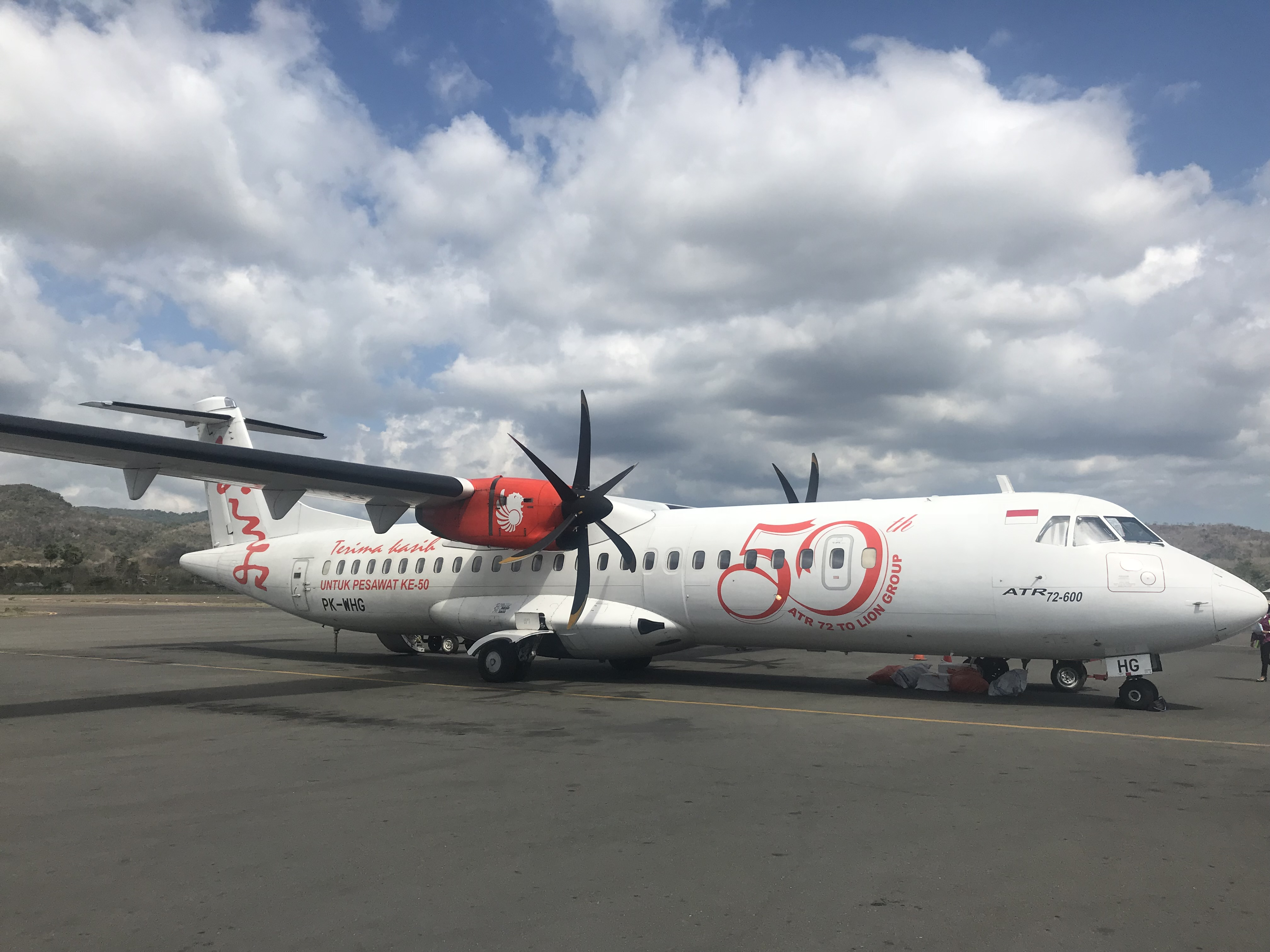
Wings Air ATR 72-600 at Komodo Airport

Annual passenger numbers and aircraft statistics
Year	Passengers handled	Passenger % change	Cargo (tonnes)	Cargo % change	Aircraft movements	Aircraft % change
2006	48,835	Steady	62	Steady	1,390	Steady
2007	48,160	▼1.4	93	▲50.0	1,406	▲1.2
2008	52,345	▲8.7	109	▲17.2	1,722	▲22.5
2009	67,631	▲29.2	132	▲21.1	1,788	▲3.8
2010	36,183	▼46.5	63	▼52.3	936	▼47.7
2011	130,113	▲259.6	161	▲155.6	3,142	▲235.7
2012	154,423	▲18.7	281	▲74.5	3,944	▲25.5
2013	184,380	▲19.4	254	▼9.6	4,558	▲15.6
2014	225,995	▲22.6	326	▲28.3	5,890	▲29.2
2015	200,212	▼11.4	267	▼18.1	4,525	▼23.2
2016	146,341	▼26.9	246	▼7.9	2,834	▼37.4
2017	460,697	▲214.8	883	▲258.9	7,798	▲175.2
2018	619,767	▲34.5	802	▼9.2	10,094	▲29.4
2019	711,706	▲14.8	777	▼3.1	10,872	▲7.7
2020	331,275	▼53.5	259	▼66.7	5,775	▼46.9
2021	363,865	▲9.8	1,982	▲665.3	5,692	▼1.4
2022	596,903	▲64.0	360	▼81.8	7,213	▲26.7
2023	942,194	▲57.8	1,744	▲384.4	9,062	▲25.6
2024	1,017,995	▲8.0	2,136	▲22.5	8,372	▼7.6
^{Source: DGCA, BPS}

== Accidents and incidents ==
- On September 14, 2011, an Aviastar BAe 146-200 aircraft struck a group of cows while landing at Komodo Airport. The front section of the aircraft was damaged, particularly just above the nose landing gear. Prior to the incident, airport personnel on motorcycles had attempted to clear the runway by driving the cows away, but were unsuccessful.
- On 14 October 2022, the ceiling of one of the boarding gates at Komodo Airport collapsed, reportedly due to heavy rainfall at the time. The incident did not disrupt passenger flow at the airport, and repairs were promptly carried out by airport authorities.
- On 19 February 2024, Indonesian AirAsia Flight 860, an Airbus A320 operating from Jakarta to Labuan Bajo, skidded off the taxiway while en route from the runway to the apron at Komodo Airport. All 151 passengers on board were unharmed. The aircraft was successfully evacuated approximately 50 minutes after the incident.

== See also ==
- Port of Labuan Bajo
