= Frans Xavier Seda Airport =

Airport in East Nusa Tenggara, Indonesia

Frans Xavier Seda Airport Bandar Udara Frans Xavier Seda
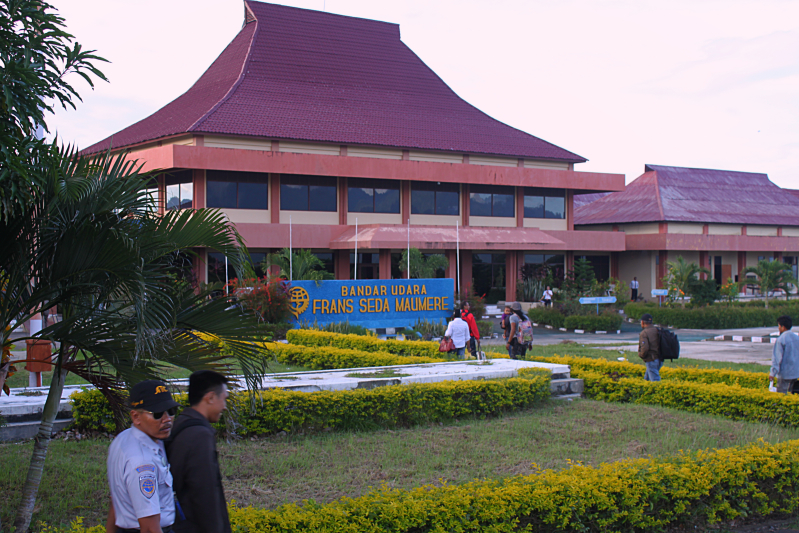
- IATA: MOF; ICAO: WATC

Summary
- Airport type: Public
- Owner: Government of Indonesia
- Operator: Directorate General of Civil Aviation
- Serves: Maumere
- Location: Maumere, Sikka Regency, East Nusa Tenggara, Indonesia
- Time zone: WITA (UTC+08:00)
- Elevation AMSL: 115 ft (35 m)
- Coordinates: 08°38′27.08″S 122°14′12.56″E

Map
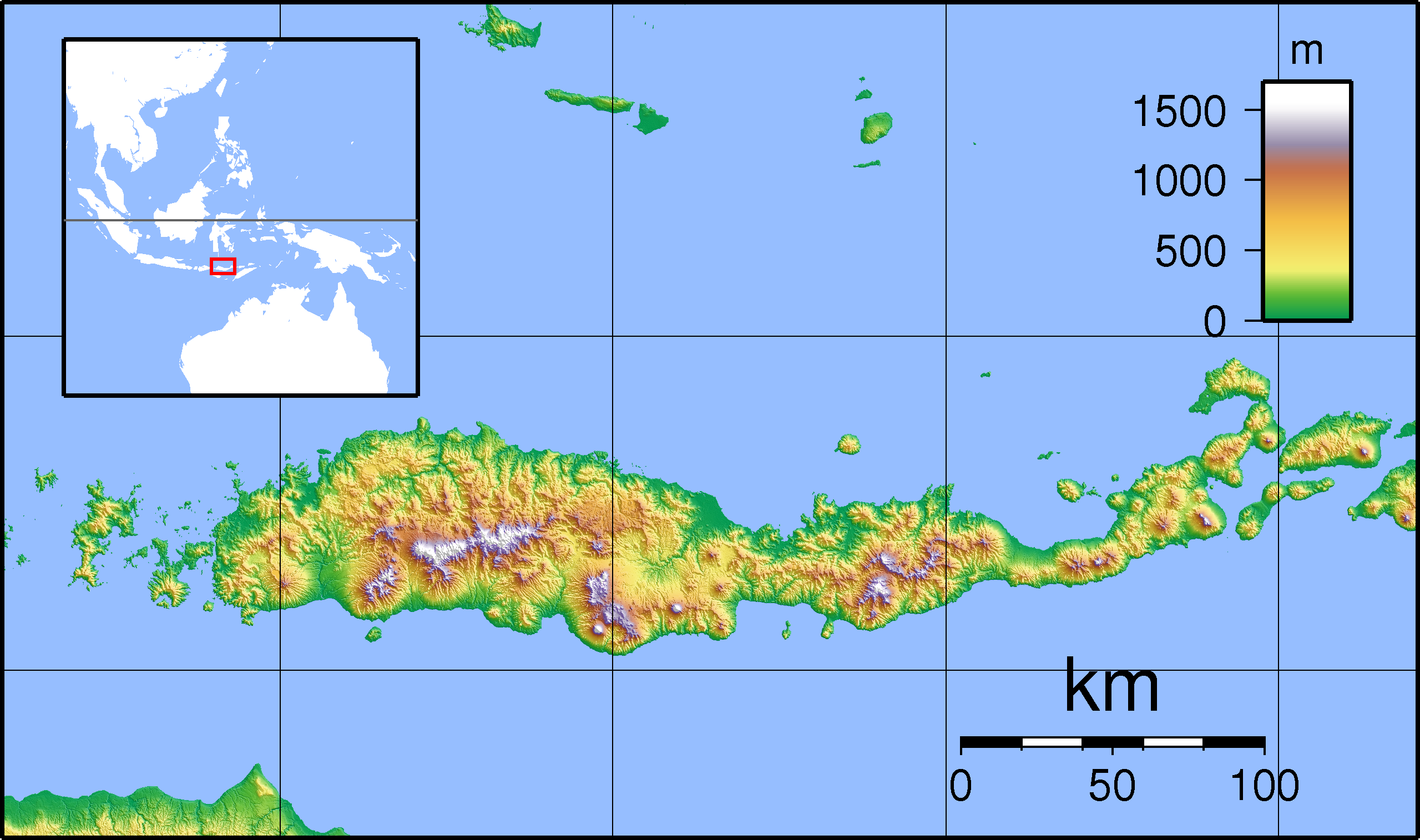
- Location of airport in Flores

Runways
Direction	Length		Surface
Direction	m	ft	Surface
05/23	2,250	7,382	Asphalt

Statistics (2024)
- Passengers: 46,656 (▼60.4%)
- Cargo (tonnes): 269.08 (▼35.9%)
- Aircraft movements: 742 (▼65.5%)
- Source: DGCA

Frans Xavier Seda Airport (IATA: MOF, ICAO: WATC), formerly Wai Oti Airport, is a domestic airport serving Maumere, the administrative seat of Sikka Regency and the largest town on the island of Flores, in the province of East Nusa Tenggara, Indonesia. The airport is named in honor of Frans Seda (1926–2009), a former Indonesian politician and finance minister who was born in Maumere. Located approximately 5 km (3.1 mi) from the town center, the airport serves as the main gateway to Maumere, Sikka Regency, and the surrounding areas. As of 2026, the airport is served by only two airlines, NAM Air and Wings Air, which operate inter-island services within East Nusa Tenggara, including flights to Kupang, the provincial capital, and Labuan Bajo, as well as Makassar in South Sulawesi. The airport previously also had scheduled service to Denpasar in Bali, but the route has since been discontinued.

== History ==
=== Construction and early history ===
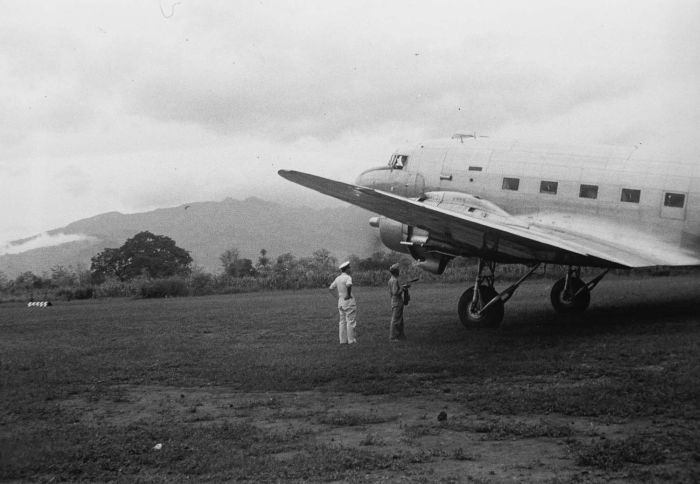
A Douglas DC-3 Dakota at Wai Oti Airfield, 1949

Frans Xavier Seda Airport was originally built in 1930 by the Department of Transport and Water Management (Dutch: Departement Voor Verkeer en Waterstaats) under the Dutch East Indies colonial government. At the time, it consisted only of a small emergency airstrip with a single 700-meter runway. The airstrip was constructed for military purposes to support the Royal Netherlands East Indies Army (KNIL) and to facilitate the movement of Dutch troops throughout Flores. It was locally known as Wai Oti Airfield, after the village where it was located.

The airfield was captured by Japanese forces during the Dutch East Indies campaign in 1942. The Japanese recognized the airfield's strategic importance due to its proximity to Australia and subsequently undertook efforts to reinforce and upgrade it. During the Japanese occupation, up to 2,000 Allied prisoners of war (POWs) were reportedly used in mid-1943 to expand and upgrade the airfield in support of Japanese military operations against the Allied forces. The upgrade and rehabilitation of the airfield were completed in October 1943. By 1944, the Japanese had also constructed another airfield adjacent to the existing airfield, which was known to Allied forces as Maumere Airfield. Both Wai Oti Airfield and Maumere Airfield were used to station Japanese medium bombers.

Following the end of the war and Indonesia's declaration of independence, the airfield was repurposed as an airbase for the Indonesian Air Force. At the time, the facility remained relatively modest and was equipped with only basic infrastructure. In the late 1950s, amid the Permesta rebellion, the airfield was used as a staging base for military operations against Permesta targets elsewhere in eastern Indonesia, including Manado and Morotai. Several Indonesian Air Force aircraft were stationed at the airfield during this period, including P-51 Mustang fighters and B-25 Mitchell bombers.

In the early 1960s, the airfield underwent upgrades and repairs in preparation for the introduction of commercial flights. The upgrades included extending the runway to accommodate commercial aircraft such as the Douglas DC-3 Dakota. At the time, the airfield was planned to serve as a transit stop for flights to Australia. By the 1970s, the airport had begun serving commercial flights, primarily pioneer services. During this period, Merpati Nusantara Airlines operated inter-island routes within East Nusa Tenggara, including the Kupang–Maumere–Larantuka–Kupang route. During this period, Merpati also introduced a new twice-weekly Denpasar–Maumere–Kupang route.

=== Contemporary history ===
Departure gate

On 11 October 1989, the airport witnessed the arrival of Pope John Paul II, who landed aboard an Indonesian Air Force C-130 Hercules during his pastoral visit to Maumere.

By the early 1990s, the airport had become the main gateway to Flores by air, as it was the largest airport on the island at the time. Compared with the smaller airstrips elsewhere on the island, it could accommodate larger aircraft and offered connections to several destinations in other parts of Indonesia. Visitors and tourists traveling to other destinations across Flores often transited through the airport before connecting to onward flights. By this time, the airport was already capable of accommodating aircraft such as the Fokker F27 and Fokker F28. In addition to Merpati, which operated pioneer routes to and from the airport, other airlines, including Bouraq Indonesian Airlines and Garuda Indonesia, also served the airport. At the time, Bouraq operated the Maumere–Denpasar route, with onward connections to Surabaya, as well as the Kupang–Maumere route.

Following the major earthquake that struck Flores in December 1992, the airport was temporarily converted into a refugee camp for people displaced by the disaster. It also became a vital hub for the delivery of humanitarian aid to earthquake victims, with Indonesian Air Force C-130 Hercules aircraft operating daily flights from Halim Perdanakusuma International Airport in Jakarta to transport relief supplies and other essential goods to the airport.

In early 2010, the Sikka Regency Government proposed renaming the airport in honor of Frans Seda, a former Indonesian minister who was born in Maumere. The proposal was subsequently submitted to and approved by the East Nusa Tenggara provincial government and the Ministry of Transportation. On 9 August 2010, the airport was officially renamed Frans Xavier Seda Airport. The renaming ceremony was attended by the then-Minister of Transportation, Freddy Numberi, and the Governor of East Nusa Tenggara, Frans Lebu Raya.

== Facilities and development ==
Baggage claim area

The passenger terminal has an area of 3,000 m² (32,000 sq ft) following renovations completed in 2016, with a boarding gate capacity of up to 210 passengers during peak periods. The two-story passenger terminal is relatively well-equipped with several passenger facilities, including check-in counters, boarding gates, baggage carousels in the arrivals area, a Flight Information Display System (FIDS), a smoking room, prayer room, ATMs, charging stations, a garden, breastfeeding room, accessible toilets, a canteen, and bus stops. Aside from the passenger terminal, the airport is also equipped with an administration building measuring 600 m² (6,458 sq ft), an operations building measuring 400 m² (4,306 sq ft), a power house measuring 390 m² (4,198 sq ft), a Aircraft Rescue and Fire Fighting (PKP-PK) building measuring 1,250 m² (13,455 sq ft), and parking areas covering 8,775 m² (94,456 sq ft).

On the airside, the airport has a single runway measuring 2,250 m × 45 m (7,382 ft × 148 ft), which was extended in 2016 to allow the airport to accommodate narrow-body aircraft such as the Airbus A320 and Boeing 737. The runway is also equipped with runway lighting and a precision approach path indicator, enabling the airport to serve night flights. The runway is also equipped with a Runway End Safety Area (RESA) at both ends, each measuring 85 m × 90 m (279 ft × 295 ft). Under the airport's master plan, the runway is planned to be extended to 2,500 m (8,200 ft) to accommodate larger aircraft, including wide-body aircraft such as the Airbus A330. The extension is also intended to enable the introduction of direct commercial services to Jakarta and Surabaya. A total investment of Rp120 billion is planned for the project, including land acquisition and site clearance. Besides the runway, the airport has a single taxiway measuring 77 m × 36 m (253 ft × 118 ft) and an aircraft apron measuring approximately 200 m × 120 m (660 ft × 390 ft), which can accommodate up to four narrow-body aircraft.

== Airlines and destinations ==
=== Passenger ===
Airlines	Destinations
NAM Air	Kupang
Wings Air	Kupang, Labuan Bajo, Makassar

== Statistics ==
A NAM Air Boeing 737-500 at Frans Xavier Seda Airport

Annual passenger numbers and aircraft statistics
Year	Passengers handled	Passenger % change	Cargo (tonnes)	Cargo % change	Aircraft movements	Aircraft % change
2006	59,381	Steady	555.64	Steady	1,526	Steady
2007	71,812	▲20.9	648.12	▲16.6	1,830	▲19.9
2008	30,062	▼58.1	140.18	▼78.4	1,288	▼29.6
2009	86,075	▲186.3	744.26	▲430.9	2,768	▲114.9
2010	110,739	▲28.7	377.98	▼49.2	2,742	▼0.9
2011	148,609	▲34.2	452.86	▲19.8	3,122	▲13.9
2012	118,989	▼19.9	1,674.47	▲269.8	2,392	▼23.4
2013	125,976	▲5.9	238.73	▼85.7	2,574	▲7.6
2014	139,918	▲11.1	408.76	▲71.2	3,100	▲20.4
2015	229,880	▲64.3	958.57	▲134.5	3,938	▲27.0
2016	216,481	▼5.8	668.48	▼30.3	3,864	▼1.9
2017	184,569	▼14.7	494.97	▼26.0	3,245	▼16.0
2018	223,666	▲21.2	510.17	▲3.1	3,856	▲18.8
2019	228,510	▲2.2	199.42	▼60.9	4,804	▲24.6
2020	120,243	▼47.4	316.06	▲58.5	2,518	▼47.6
2021	103,631	▼13.8	681.47	▲115.6	2,414	▼4.1
2022	118,535	▲14.4	595.40	▼12.6	2,134	▼11.6
2023	117,953	▼0.5	419.95	▼29.5	2,148	▲0.7
2024	46,656	▼60.4	269.08	▼35.9	742	▼65.5
^{Source: DGCA, BPS}
