= Tardamu Airport =

Tardamu Airport Bandar Udara Tardamu
- IATA: SAU; ICAO: WATS

Summary
- Airport type: Public
- Serves: Savu Island
- Location: Savu Island, East Nusa Tenggara, Indonesia
- Time zone: WITA (UTC+08:00)
- Elevation AMSL: 46 ft (14 m)
- Coordinates: 10°29′33″S 121°50′54″E

Map
- Location of the airport in Indonesia

Runways
Direction	Length		Surface
Direction	m	ft	Surface
07/25	900	2,953	Asphalt

Tardamu Airport (IATA: SAU, ICAO: WATS) is located in Sabu Island, Sabu Raijua Regency, East Nusa Tenggara, Indonesia. Due to the short runway, it is only served by Cessna 264: Caravan jetprop aircraft operated by Susi Air up to twice per day from Kupang, up to five times per week from Waingapu and up to five times per week from Ende.

== Airlines and destinations ==
Airlines	Destinations
Susi Air	Ende, Kupang, Waingapu
