= Ba'a =

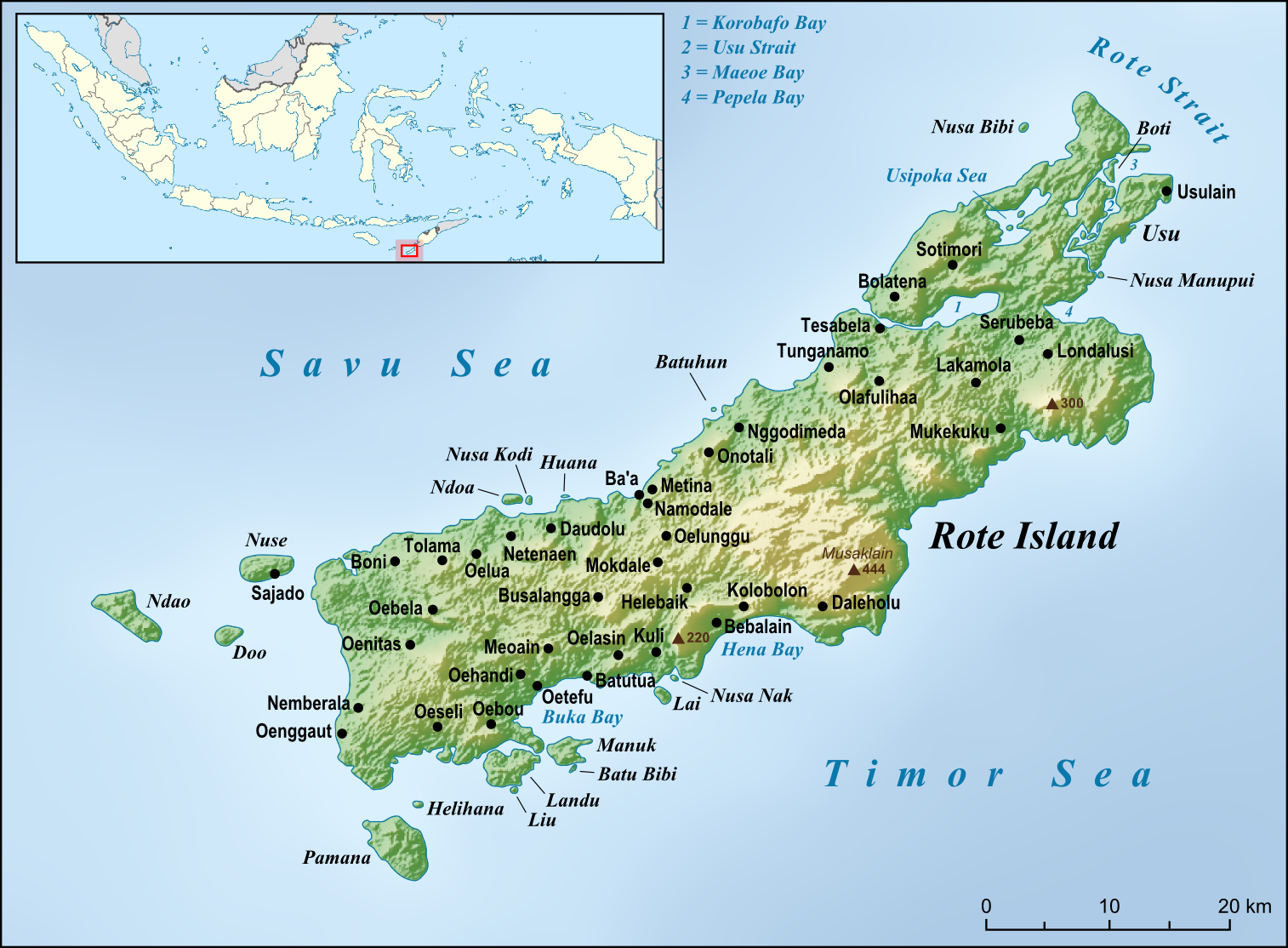
- Map of Rote Island

- Map of Lesser Sunda Islands
- Coordinates: 10°43′35.015732″S 123°2′52.303391″E
- Country: Indonesia
- Province: East Nusa Tenggara
- Regency: Rote Ndao Regency
- District: Lobalain

Population (2020 Census)
  - Total: 1,263

Ba'a (Baa, Baadale) is the capital of the Indonesian island of Rote and of the Rote Ndao Regency (kabupaten), in the province of East Nusa Tenggara. It lies in the district (kecamatan) of Lobalain, and constitutes a village (desa) with 1,263 inhabitants at the 2020 Census.
