= Rote Ndao Regency =

Regency in East Nusa Tenggara, Indonesia

Rote Ndao Regency Kabupaten Rote Ndao
- Regency
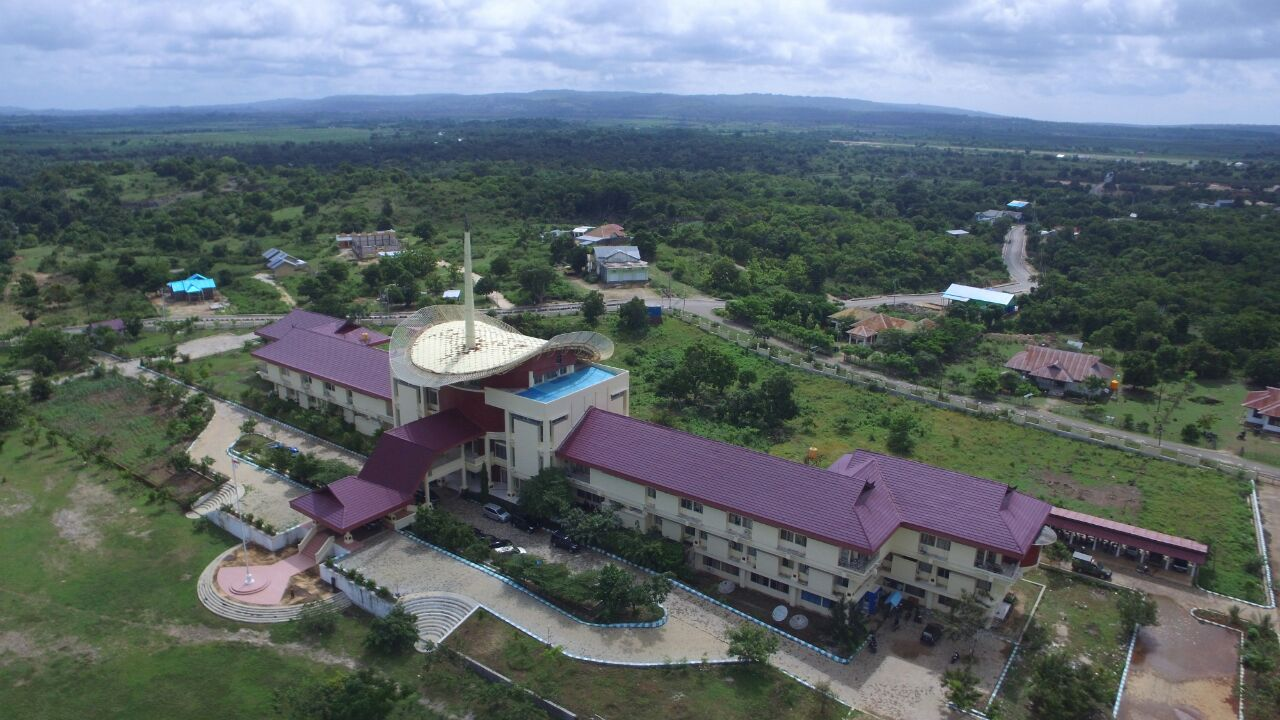
- Ba'a, regency seat of Rote Ndao from above

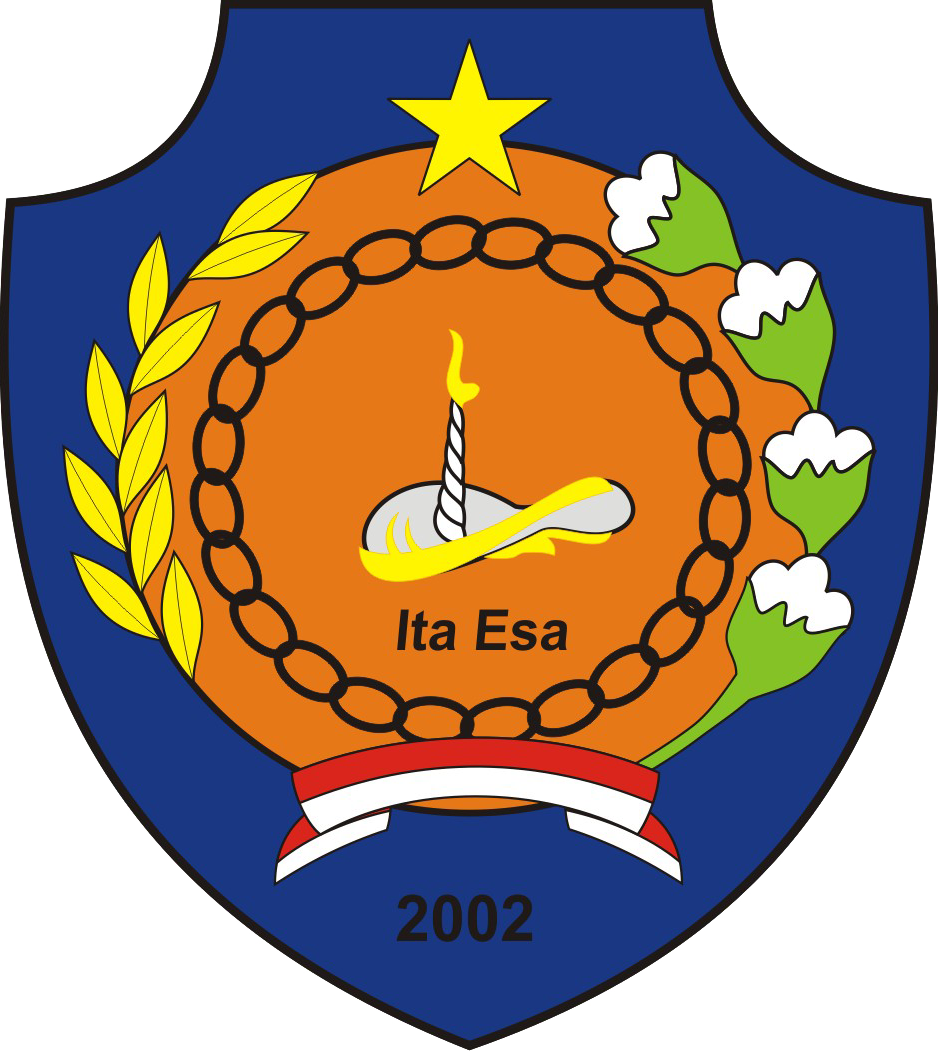
- Coat of arms

- Location within East Nusa Tenggara

- Location in Lesser Sunda Islands and Indonesia Rote Ndao Regency (Indonesia)
- Coordinates: 10.4667°S 123.3833°E
- Country: Indonesia
- Region: Lesser Sunda Islands
- Province: East Nusa Tenggara
- Established: 10 April 2002
- Capital: Baa

Government
  - Regent: Paulus Henuk
  - Vice Regent: Apremoi Dudelusy Dethan

Area
  - Land: 1,280.10 km^{2} (494.25 sq mi)

Population (mid 2025 estimate)
  - Total: 155,371
  - Density: 120/km^{2} (310/sq mi)
- Area code: (+62) 380
- HDI (2020): ▲0.627 (Medium)
- Website: rotendaokab.go.id

Rote Ndao Regency is a regency in East Nusa Tenggara province of Indonesia, consisting primarily of the island of Rote, situated south-west of the western tip of West Timor with an area of 978.54 km^{2}, together with minor offshore islands including Usu (19.4 km^{2}), Ndana (13.83 km^{2}), Ndao, Landu and Nuse; the total area including the minor offshore islands is 1,280.10 km^{2}. The regency seat is in the village of Ba'a (or Baadale), which is situated in Lobalain District. The population of the Regency was 119,908 as of the 2010 census and 143,764 at the 2020 Census; the official estimate as of mid-2025 was 155,371 (comprising 78,172 males and 77,199 females).

== History ==
Created under Law (Undang-Undang) RI No.9 of 2002, Rote Ndao Regency was established with effect from 10 April 2002; it was previously a part of Kupang Regency.

In 1962, it was divided into 4 districts; West, East, South, and Central Rote. Later, in 1967 it was split into 8 districts to fulfill requirements to become an independent regency. This goal was finally realized in 2002 after central government was pressurised by around 300 cultural figures from 19 traditional regions in the area.

== Infrastructure ==
There are 542.5 kilometres of road in the regency, from which 314.7 kilometres have been paved with asphalt as of 2020. The regency is served by David Constantijn Saudale Airport with 1,200 metres of a single runway, located around 7 kilometres from the regency seat.

There are four ports in the regency, the biggest and busiest being Ba'a Port, which handled 55% of the region's ship traffic in 2019. Ba'a Port is also connected to president Joko Widodo's sea toll program route TL13 which aimed to reduce development and economic gap between isolated regions. Government of Indonesia also constructed a laboratory and quarantine facility in the port in 2019 as part of massive expansions of the port.

The regency has one regional hospital owned by government of the regency, in addition to 12 puskesmas (Community healthcare centre), 381 healthcare centers, 14 maternity cottages, and four pharmacies. The regional hospital, Ba'a Regional Hospital is located on regency seat. It is classified as D class hospital by Indonesian Ministry of Health. Education facilities in the regency consist of 65 kindergartens, 145 elementary schools, 53 junior high schools, 10 senior high schools, 5 vocational high schools, and one special education school. There's also one higher education institution, Nusa Lontar Rote University.

There are exactly 456 Protestant churches, 13 Catholic churches, 11 mosques, and one Hindu temple. As of 2020, most of the regency has access to 4G internet services and other telecommunication services. The only fiber optic service provider in the regency is IndiHome, which is state-owned under Telkomsel.

== Economy ==
Main economic activities in the region as of 2019 was agriculture. There are 22,684 ha of paddy fields in the regency. 50.36% of the regency's workforce work on agriculture sector and contributes to 47.12% of regency's economy. Another important commodity is red onion, which the regency produced 34,257 quintals of it in 2019. Other commodities such as coconut and guava also exist, which the regency's produced 3,445 tons and 45 tons in order. Mining and energy sector contributes around 12% to regency's economy as of 2019. Food processing industry also have established presence in the region and employed around 5,000 workers as of 2019.

Tourism is a small but growing sector in the regency. There were 21 homestays and 33 hotels in varying quality of service on the regency as of 2019. In the same year, the regency was visited by exactly 4,988 tourists, whom more than half of it came from abroad. This was an increase from 2018, which the regency saw 3,861 tourists visiting the region.

Economic growth was 5.23% in 2019, a slight decrease from previous year with 5.42%. The fastest growing sector was natural gas and energy with increase of 18% on the same year. At the same time, unemployment rate was 2.03%.

== Geography ==
The regency is surrounded by water, bordering the Savu Sea to the north, the Indian Ocean to the south and west, and the Pukuafu Strait to the east. It is composed of 107 islands, 8 of which are inhabited and 99 are uninhabited. The topography varies from flat make up 35% of its territory to hills around 25%, from 0 to 1,500 metres above sea level. Around 60% of its territory are 200 metres above sea level.

== Administration ==
This Regency was originally composed of six districts (kecamatan), but it later underwent re-organisation into eight districts, and in 2012 into ten districts; an eleventh district (Loaholu) has subsequently been added from the western part of Rote Barat Laut District. Their areas (in km^{2}) and their 2010 and 2020 Census populations are listed below, together with the official estimates as of mid-2025. The table also includes the locations of the district administrative centres, the number of administrative villages in each district (in total, 112 rural desa and 7 urban kelurahan), and its postal codes.

Kode Wilayah	Name of District (kecamatan)	English name	Area in km^{2}	Pop'n Census 2010	Pop'n Census 2020	Pop'n Estimate mid 2025	Admin centre	No. of villages	Post codes
53.14.01	Rote Barat Daya ^{(a)}	Southwest; Rote Island	114.57	19,737	24,309	26,569	Batutua	19	85982
53.14.02	Rote Barat Laut ^{(b)}	Northwest; Rote Island	98.53	22,608	26,916	16,832	Busalangga	12 ^{(c)}	85981
53.14.11	Loaholu		73.87	^{(d)}	^{(d)}	12,271	Oelaba	10	85981
53.14.03	Lobalain	(Busalangga)	145.70	24,789	30,669	33,522	Ba'a	18 ^{(e)}	85912: 85918
53.14.04	Rote Tengah	Middle Rote	162.50	8,058	8,984	9,383	Feapopi	8 ^{(f)}	85971
53.14.08	Rote Selatan	South Rote	73.38	5,173	6,015	6,402	Daleholu	7	85972
53.14.05	Pantai Baru	Baru Beach	176.18	12,397	14,476	15,476	Olafulihaa	15 ^{(g)}	85973
53.14.06	Rote Timur ^{(h)}	East Rote	110.84	12,093	14,343	15,341	Eahun	11 ^{(i)}	85975
53.14.10	Landu Leko		194.06	4,540	5,247	5,612	Landu Leko	7	85974
53.14.07	Rote Barat	West Rote	116.28	7,426	9,113	9,937	Delha	7	85981 & 85982
53.14.09	Ndao Nuse ^{(j)}		14.19	3,087	3,692	4,026	Ndao Nuse	5	85983
	Totals		1,280.10	119,908	143,764	155,371	Ba'a	119	

Notes: (a) including 36 offshore islands, the largest being Ndana, Landu and Nusa Manuk. (b) including 7 offshore islands. (c) including one kelurahan - Busalangga.
(d) the 2010 and 2020 Census populations of the new Loaholu District are included in the figures for Rote Barat Laut District, from which it was cut out.
(e) comprises 3 kelurahan (Metina, Mokdale and Namodale) and 15 desa. (f) including one kelurahan - Onatali.
(g) including one kelurahan - Olafulihaa. (h) including 45 offshore islands. (i) including one kelurahan - Serubeba.
(j) Ndao Nuse District comprises the offshore Ndao Island (with an area of 8.63 km^{2}), Nuse Island (5.66 km^{2}) and Do'o Island.
