= Kupang Regency =

Regency in East Nusa Tenggara, Indonesia

Kupang Regency Kabupaten Kupang
- Regency
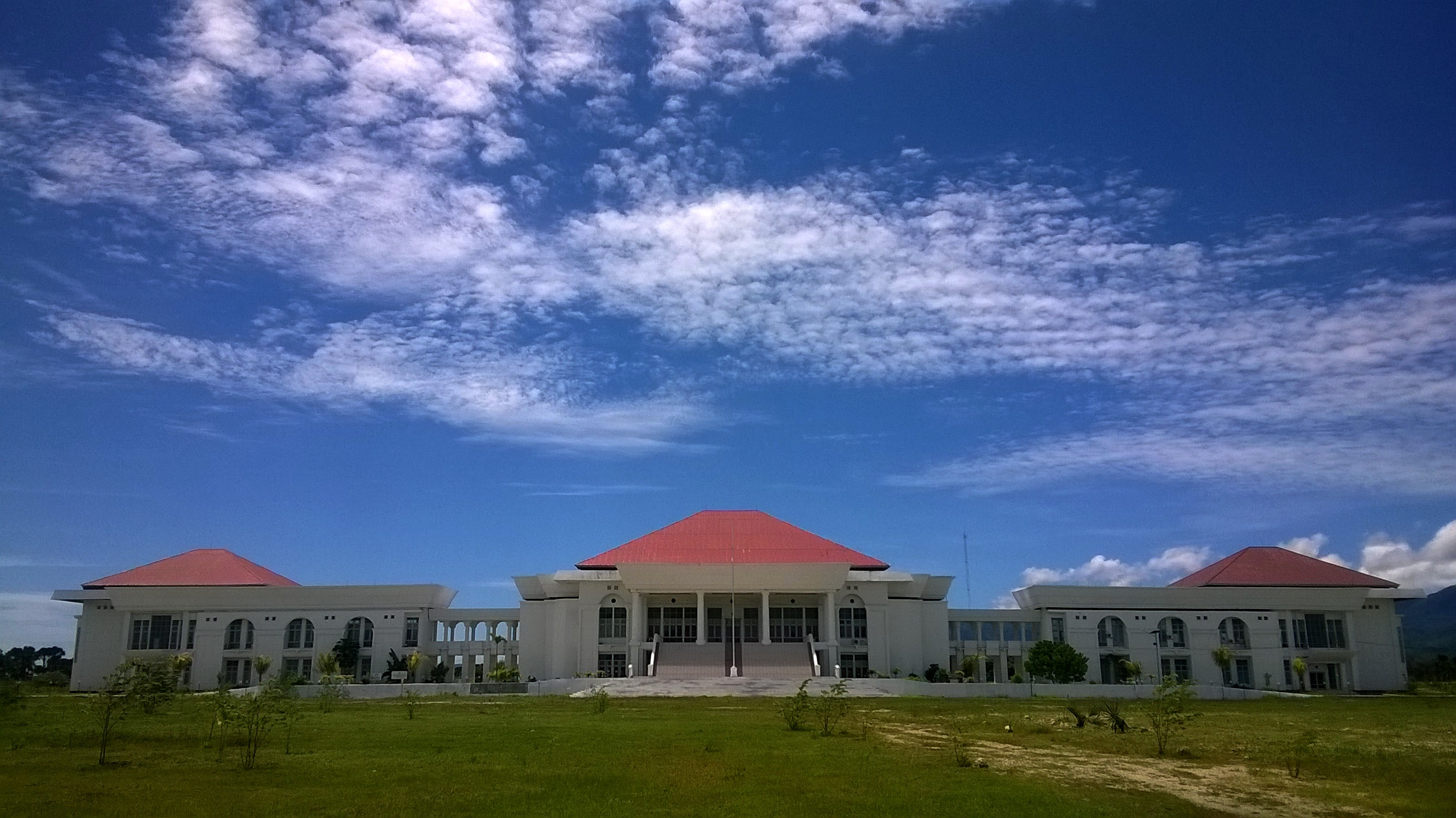
- Kupang Regent's office

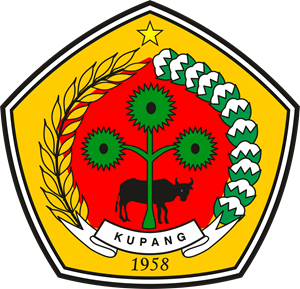
- Seal

- Location within East Nusa Tenggara

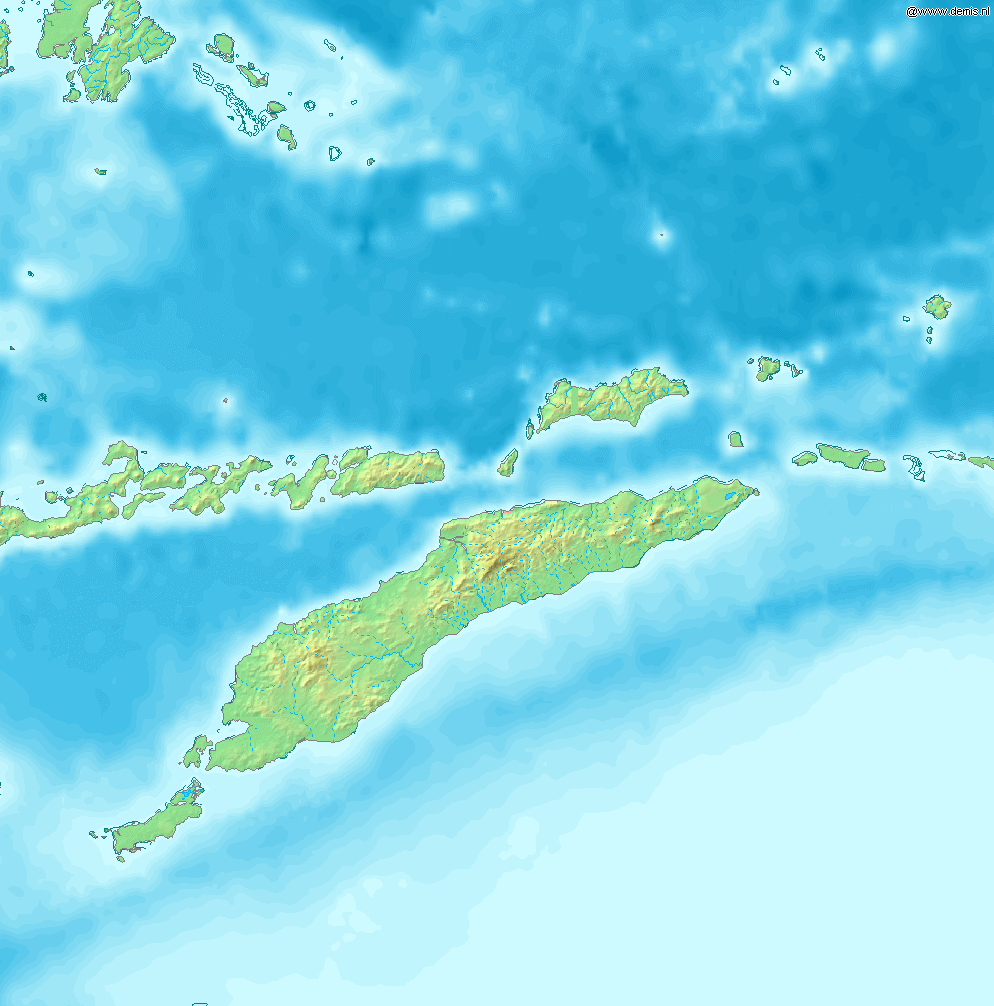
- Location in Timor, Lesser Sunda Islands and Indonesia Kupang Regency (Lesser Sunda Islands) Kupang Regency (Indonesia)
- Coordinates: 10°18′S 123°43′E
- Country: Indonesia
- Region: Lesser Sunda Islands
- Province: East Nusa Tenggara
- Capital: Oelamasi

Government
  - Regent: Yosef Lede
  - Vice Regent: Aurum Obe Titu Eki

Area
  - Total: 5,298.13 km^{2} (2,045.62 sq mi)

Population (mid 2025 estimate)
  - Total: 383,387
  - Density: 72.3627/km^{2} (187.419/sq mi)
- Time zone: UTC+8 (ICST)
- Area code: (+62) 380
- Website: kab-kupang.go.id; kupangkab.go.id

Kupang Regency is a regency in East Nusa Tenggara province of Indonesia. It occupies the far western end of Timor Island (apart from the area of Kupang city, which has been administratively separated from the Regency since 11 April 1996), together with the smaller island of Semau (off the southwestern tip of Timor) and other minor offshore islands (of which Kera is the only inhabited). Other islands further to the southwest and west which were formerly part of Kupang Regency have been separated administratively - the Rote Islands Group on 10 April 2002 (to form Rote Ndao Regency), and the Savu Islands Group on 29 October 2008 (to form Sabu Raijua Regency).

The residual regency covers an area of 5,298.13 square kilometres (2,045.62 sq mi). It had a population of 304,548 at the 2010 Census and 366,383 at the 2020 Census; the official estimate as of mid-2025 was 383,387 (comprising 194,020 males and 189,367 females).

The capital of Kupang Regency is at Oelamasi.

== Demographics ==
Of the population in mid 2025, 98,281 (25.63%) were below the age of 15, and 285,106 were aged 15 and above; of the latter, 258,713 (67.48%) were of working age and 26,393 (6.88%) were aged 65 and above.

== Administration ==
The regency is divided into twenty-four districts (kecamatan), tabulated below with their areas and their populations at the 2010 Census and the 2020 Census, together with the official estimates as of mid-2025. The districts are grouped geographically, and these groups have no administrative significance. The table also includes the locations of the district administrative centres, the number of administrative villages in each district (totaling 160 rural desa and 17 urban kelurahan), and its post code.

| Kode Wilayah | Name of District (kecamatan) | English name | Area in km^{2} | Pop'n Census 2010 | Pop'n Census 2020 | Pop'n Estimate mid 2025 | Admin centre | No. of desa | No. of kelu- rahan | Post code |
|---|---|---|---|---|---|---|---|---|---|---|
| 53.01.04 | Semau | Semau Island (North) | 143.42 | 6,688 | 7,614 | 7,740 | Uitao | 8 | - | 85352 |
| 53.01.23 | Semau Selatan | Semau Island (South) | 153.00 | 4,731 | 5,396 | 5,490 | Akle | 6 | - | 85353 |
| Totals | Semau Island | Semau Island | 296.42 | 11,419 | 13,010 | 13,230 | | 14 | - | |
| 53.01.05 | Kupang Barat | West Kupang | 149.72 | 15,417 | 18,270 | 18,945 | Batakte | 10 | 2 | 85351 |
| 53.01.16 | Nekamese | | 128.40 | 9,010 | 11,524 | 12,411 | Oemasi | 11 | - | 85390 |
| 53.01.08 | Kupang Tengah | Central Kupang | 88.64 | 33,805 | 45,709 | 50,602 | Tarus | 7 | 1 | 85361 |
| 53.01.24 | Taebenu | | 106.42 | 14,594 | 18,166 | 19,302 | Baumata | 8 | - | 85360 |
| 53.01.09 | Amarasi | | 154.90 | 15,279 | 17,881 | 18,427 | Oekabiti | 8 | 1 | 85367 |
| 53.01.17 | Amarasi Barat | West Amarasi | 246.47 | 14,375 | 16,846 | 17,372 | Teunbaun | 7 | 1 | 85376 |
| 53.01.18 | Amarasi Selatan | South Amarasi | 172.81 | 10,276 | 11,839 | 12,106 | Buraen | 3 | 2 | 85377 |
| 53.01.19 | Amarasi Timur | East Amarasi | 162.92 | 7,054 | 8,935 | 9,576 | Pakubaun | 4 | - | 85378 |
| 53.01.06 | Kupang Timur | East Kupang | 338.60 | 40,525 | 51,032 | 54,536 | Babau | 8 | 5 | 85362 |
| 53.01.20 | Amabi Oefeto Timur | East Amabi Oefeto | 236.72 | 13,059 | 13,277 | 12,760 | Oemofa | 10 | - | 85363 |
| 53.01.25 | Amabi Oefeto | Amabi Oefeto | 123.90 | 7,747 | 8,611 | 8,650 | Fatuknutu | 7 | - | 85362 & 85363 |
| 53.01.07 | Sulamu | | 141.18 | 14,280 | 17,394 | 18,284 | Sulamu | 6 | 1 | 85368 |
| Totals | Southern group | | 2,050.58 | 195,421 | 239,484 | 252,971 | | 89 | 13 | |
| 53.01.10 | Fatuleu | | 351.52 | 23,007 | 26,849 | 27,630 | Camplong | 9 | 1 | 85371 |
| 53.01.28 | Fatuleu Tengah | Central Fatuleu | 107.85 | 4,885 | 5,736 | 5,921 | Oelbiteno | 4 | - | 85320 |
| 53.01.27 | Fatuleu Barat | West Fatuleu | 496.47 | 8,399 | 9,070 | 8,982 | Poto | 5 | - | 85323 |
| 53.01.11 | Takari | | 508.13 | 20,262 | 24,566 | 25,764 | Takari | 9 | 1 | 85369 |
| Totals | Fatuleu group | | 1,463.97 | 56,553 | 66,221 | 68,297 | | 27 | 2 | |
| 53.01.12 | Amfoang Selatan | South Amfoang | 305.09 | 8,628 | 10,003 | 10,261 | Lelogama | 6 | 1 | 85373 |
| 53.01.21 | Amfoang Barat Daya | Southwest Amfoang | 167.61 | 4,263 | 5,075 | 5,274 | Manubelon | 4 | - | 85364 |
| 53.01.30 | Amfoang Tengah | Central Amfoang | 174.21 | 5,397 | 6,410 | 6,654 | Naikliu | 4 | - | 85374 |
| 53.01.13 | Amfoang Utara | North Amfoang | 278.42 | 7,004 | 8,091 | 8,284 | Soliu | 5 | 1 | 85365 |
| 53.01.22 | Amfoang Barat Laut | Northwest Amfoang | 428.59 | 8,762 | 10,376 | 10,756 | Nunuanah | 6 | - | 85372 |
| 53.01.26 | Amfoang Timur | East Amfoang | 133.24 | 7,101 | 7,713 | 7,660 | Fatumonas | 5 | - | 85375 |
| Totals | Amfoang group | | 1,487.16 | 41,155 | 47,668 | 48,889 | | 30 | 2 | |
| | Totals | | 5,298.13 | 304,548 | 366,383 | 383,387 | Oelamasi | 160 | 17 | |
