= NAM Air =

Indonesian airline

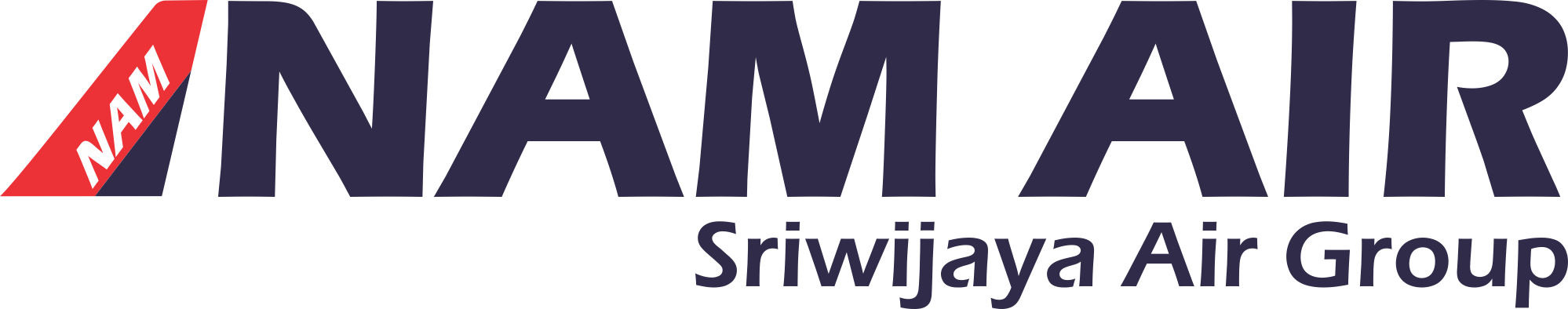

IATA	ICAO	Call sign
IN	LKN	NAMAIR
- Founded: 26 September 2013; 13 years ago
- Commenced operations: 11 December 2013; 12 years ago
- Hubs: Soekarno–Hatta International Airport
- Fleet size: 12
- Destinations: 18
- Parent company: Sriwijaya Air
- Headquarters: Jakarta, Indonesia
- Key people: Gabriel S.X.B., CEO Chandra Lie, President Commissioner
- Website: www.flynamair.com

NAM Air is an Indonesian regional airline based at Soekarno–Hatta International Airport in Tangerang, Indonesia. The airline was founded on 26 September 2013, and operates as regional feeder subsidiary for Sriwijaya Air. The airline serves smaller markets not targeted by its parent company.

== History ==
=== Launch (2013) ===
The creation of NAM Air was announced on 26 September 2013, originally envisioned as a full-service subsidiary for the Sriwijaya Air Group that was to compete with the Indonesian state-owned flag carrier, Garuda Indonesia and Lion Air Group's Batik Air. The airline's inception was announced by Sriwijaya Air President, Chandra Lie, who dedicated the airline in the name of his father, Lo Kui Nam.

The airline's full service intentions was later scrapped in favour of being a feeder carrier to Sriwijaya Air, akin to the relationship between Wings Air and Lion Air; under this arrangement, Sriwijaya Air would serve mainline routes, whereas NAM Air would operate secondary routes not targeted by its parent.

Following the announcement, the airline planned on launching its maiden flight in October 2013. The launch was later postponed due to the pending issuance of the carrier's Air Operator's Certificate (AOC) by the Indonesian Ministry of Transportation. NAM Air acquired its AOC on 29 November 2013 and flew its first testing flight from Jakarta to Pangkal Pinang on 11 December 2013. On 19 December 2013, the airline operated its maiden commercial flight from Jakarta to Pontianak to Yogyakarta with a Boeing 737-500 aircraft equipped with 120 seats in two classes. Upon its launch, NAM Air became the first airline to allow its female flight attendants to use a hijab as part of their uniform on any given flight.

=== Lifting from EU blacklist (2018) ===
NAM Air was included in the EU airline blacklist of carriers that did not meet necessary safety standards to fly to airports in the European Union, and was thus banned from operating in European airspace. It was removed from the blacklist, along with every other Indonesian airline in June 2018.

=== Garuda Indonesia management (2018–2019) ===
On 8 November 2018, NAM Air and its parent, Sriwijaya Air, entered a cooperation agreement with Garuda Indonesia, effectively taking over the operations and financial management of both airlines through its subsidiary, Citilink Indonesia. The agreement was made in order to facilitate the financial recovery of the struggling Sriwijaya Air Group through the improvement of operations and financial performance with help of the Garuda Indonesia Group. The agreement was terminated on 15 November 2019 after disputes between the two parties.

== Destinations ==
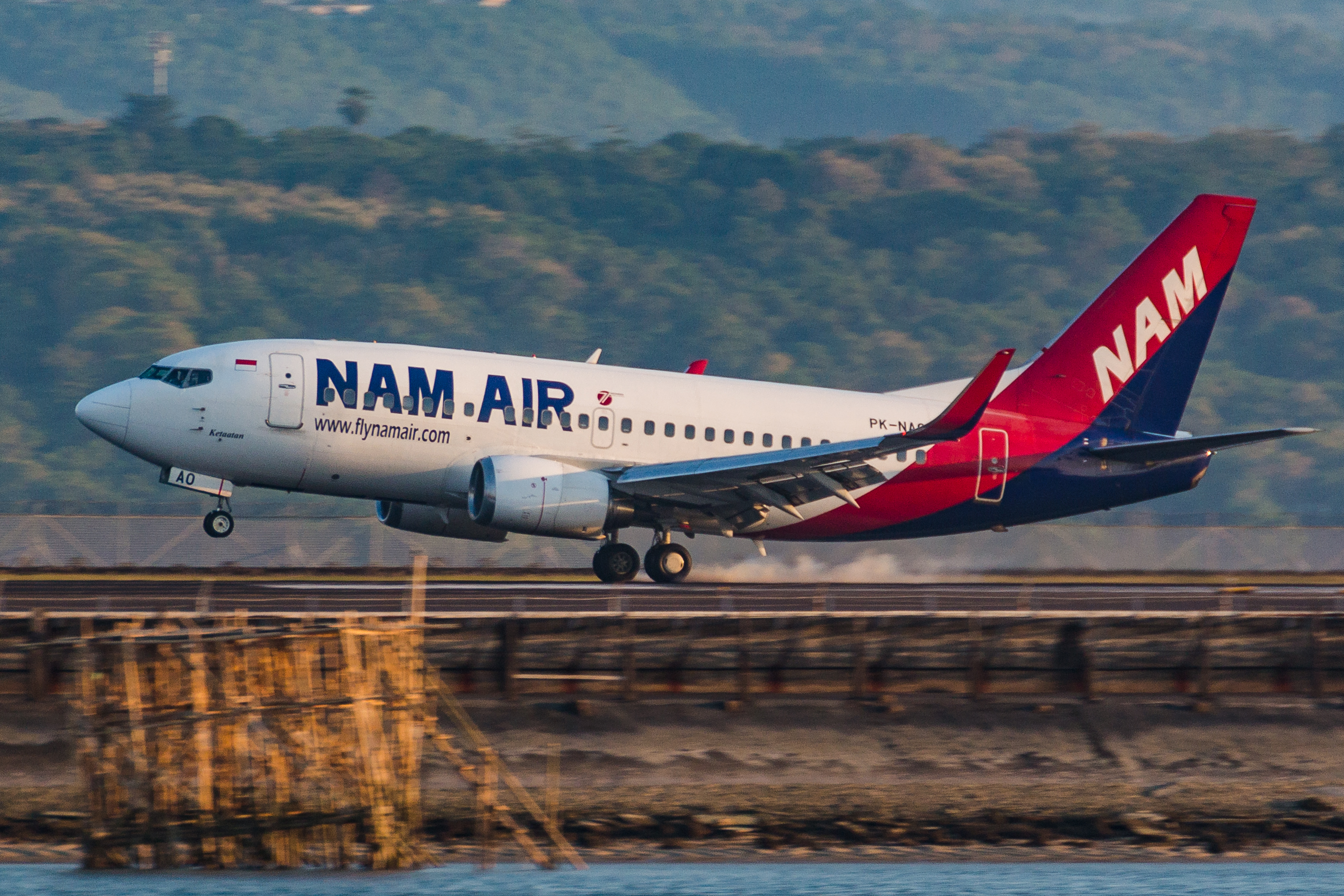
NAM Air Boeing 737-500

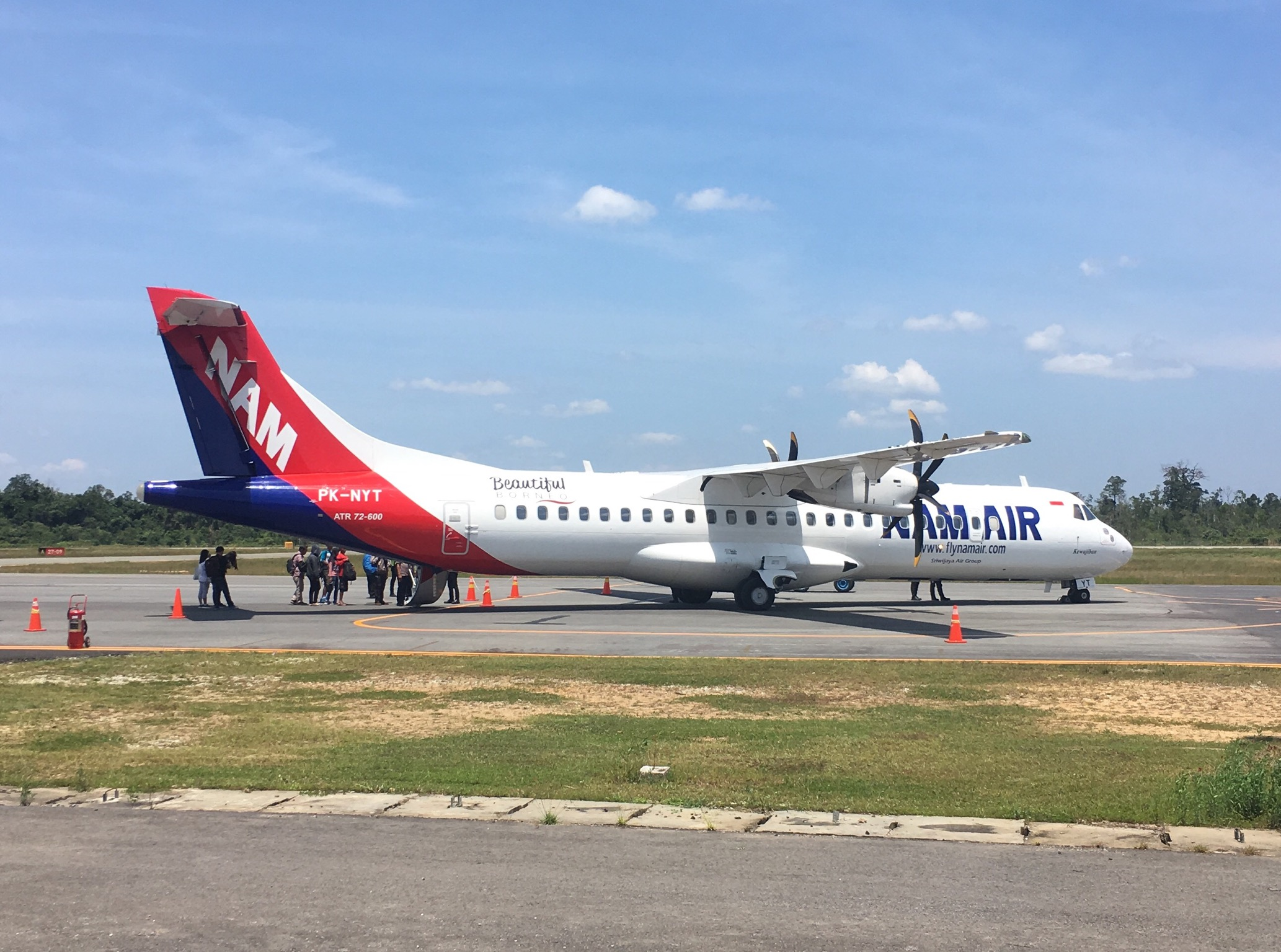
NAM Air ATR 72-600

As of February 2023, NAM Air flies an entirely domestic network to the following destinations:

Country	City	Airport	Notes	Refs
Indonesia	Alor Island	Alor Island Airport	Terminated	
Indonesia	Ambon	Pattimura Airport	Terminated	
Indonesia	Bajawa	Soa Airport	Terminated	
Indonesia	Balikpapan	Sultan Aji Muhammad Sulaiman Sepinggan Airport	Terminated	
Indonesia	Bandar Lampung	Radin Inten II Airport		
Indonesia	Bandung	Husein Sastranegara Airport		
Indonesia	Banyuwangi	Banyuwangi Airport	Terminated	
Indonesia	Biak	Frans Kaisiepo Airport	Terminated	
Indonesia	Bima	Sultan Muhammad Salahudin Airport		
Indonesia	Banjarmasin	Syamsudin Noor International Airport	Terminated	
Indonesia	Denpasar	Ngurah Rai International Airport		
Indonesia	Ende	H. Hasan Aroeboesman Airport	Terminated	
Indonesia	Fakfak	Torea Airport	Terminated	
Indonesia	Jakarta	Soekarno–Hatta International Airport	Hub	
Indonesia	Jayapura	Sentani International Airport	Terminated	
Indonesia	Ketapang	Rahadi Oesman Airport		
Indonesia	Kupang	El Tari Airport		
Indonesia	Labuan Bajo	Komodo International Airport		
Indonesia	Lombok	Lombok International Airport		
Indonesia	Lubuklinggau	Silampari Airport		
Indonesia	Maumere	Frans Xavier Seda Airport		
Indonesia	Manado	Sam Ratulangi International Airport	Terminated	
Indonesia	Muara Bungo	Muara Bungo Airport		
Indonesia	Kaimana	Utarom Airport	Terminated	
Indonesia	Palembang	Sultan Mahmud Badaruddin II International Airport		
Indonesia	Pangkal Pinang	Depati Amir Airport		
Indonesia	Pangkalan Bun	Iskandar Airport		
Indonesia	Pontianak	Supadio International Airport		
Indonesia	Putussibau	Pangsuma Airport		
Indonesia	Ranai	Ranai-Natuna Airport		
Indonesia	Ruteng	Frans Sales Lega Airport	Terminated	
Indonesia	Samarinda	Aji Pangeran Tumenggung Pranoto International Airport		
Indonesia	Sampit	H. Asan Airport		
Indonesia	Sintang	Tebelian Airport		
Indonesia	Semarang	Jenderal Ahmad Yani International Airport		
Indonesia	Sorong	Domine Eduard Osok Airport	Terminated	
Indonesia	Surabaya	Juanda International Airport		
Indonesia	Surakarta	Adisoemarmo International Airport		
Indonesia	Tanjung Pandan	H.A.S. Hanandjoeddin International Airport		
Indonesia	Tambolaka	Lede Kalumbang Airport		
Indonesia	Tarakan	Juwata Airport	Terminated	
Indonesia	Ternate	Sultan Babullah Airport	Terminated	
Indonesia	Waingapu	Umbu Mehang Kunda Airport		
Indonesia	Waisai	Marinda Airport	Terminated	
Indonesia	Yogyakarta	Yogyakarta International Airport		

== Fleet ==
=== Current fleet ===
As of July 2026, NAM Air operates the following aircraft:

Aircraft	In service	Orders	Passengers			Notes
Aircraft	In service	Orders	C	Y	Total	Notes
ATR 72-600	1	—				
Boeing 737-500	11	—	8	112	120	
Total	12	—				

=== Former fleet ===
As of August 2025, NAM Air operated 11 Boeing 737-500.
