= Riau Airlines =

Indonesian airline

Riau Air
IATA	ICAO	Call sign
PK	RIU	RIAU AIR
- Founded: 2002
- Ceased operations: 2012
- Hubs: Sultan Syarif Kasim II International Airport
- Fleet size: 1
- Destinations: 3
- Headquarters: Pekanbaru, Indonesia
- Key people: The Spirit of Riau
- Website: http://www.riau-airlines.com

Riau Airlines was an airline based in Pekanbaru in the Indonesian province of Riau, Sumatra. It operated domestic and international services out of Sultan Syarif Qasim II International Airport, Pekanbaru. Riau Airlines was listed in category 1 by Indonesian Civil Aviation Authority for airline safety.

== History ==
Riau Airlines was established on 12 March 2002 and started operations in December of the same year. It was the only one of Indonesia's commercial airlines headquartered outside of Jakarta, the Indonesian capital, and also the only commercial airline owned by a local government. It was majority-owned by the Provincial Government of Riau and some other provinces such as Lampung, Bangka Belitung and Bengkulu, as well as some cities and Regencies in Sumatera.

Riau Airlines was originally formed to connect cities within Riau, however, it expanded towards linking all major cities on Sumatra island, as well as serving Borneo island, Bali, and Kupang in Central Indonesia.

In 2008, the airline was temporarily shut down after an employee strike against the management. This, however, took only a few days.

After the strike, between 2009 and 2010, there had been changes in the top management. In early 2010, the management decided to change the name Riau Airlines to Riau Air and also the logo.

By the third quarter of 2010, the airline started to hit a financial crisis, which led the lay-off around 25% of its employee at the end of January the following year. The crisis continued after the management failed to run the company. This ended up with the second lay-off just three months after the first one and this time the rest of the employee got terminated and left only the directors stayed in the company (President Director, Financial Director, Operations Director, and Commercial Director).

However, all the laid-off employees have not been paid for compensations which supposedly paid right after the decision was implemented. Some of the employees decided to bring this matter to court and won, however, until early 2014 the employees have not got what supposedly their right.

On July 12, 2012, the Medan Commercial Court declared Riau Airlines bankrupt and that the airline would cease operations.

This decision was preceded by an order issued on April 1, 2012, by the Indonesian Ministry of Transport that revoked the airline's Air Operating Certificate after operations ceased last year.

However, on December 31, 2013, MA entreated Riau Airlines is not doing good and the airline permanently suspended and already declared bankruptcy.

Board of Directors (April 2014) - President Director: Teguh Triyanto - Financial & HR Director: Fizan Noordjaelani - Operations Director: Capt. Maman Syaifurohman - Commercial Director: Revan Menzano

== Destinations ==
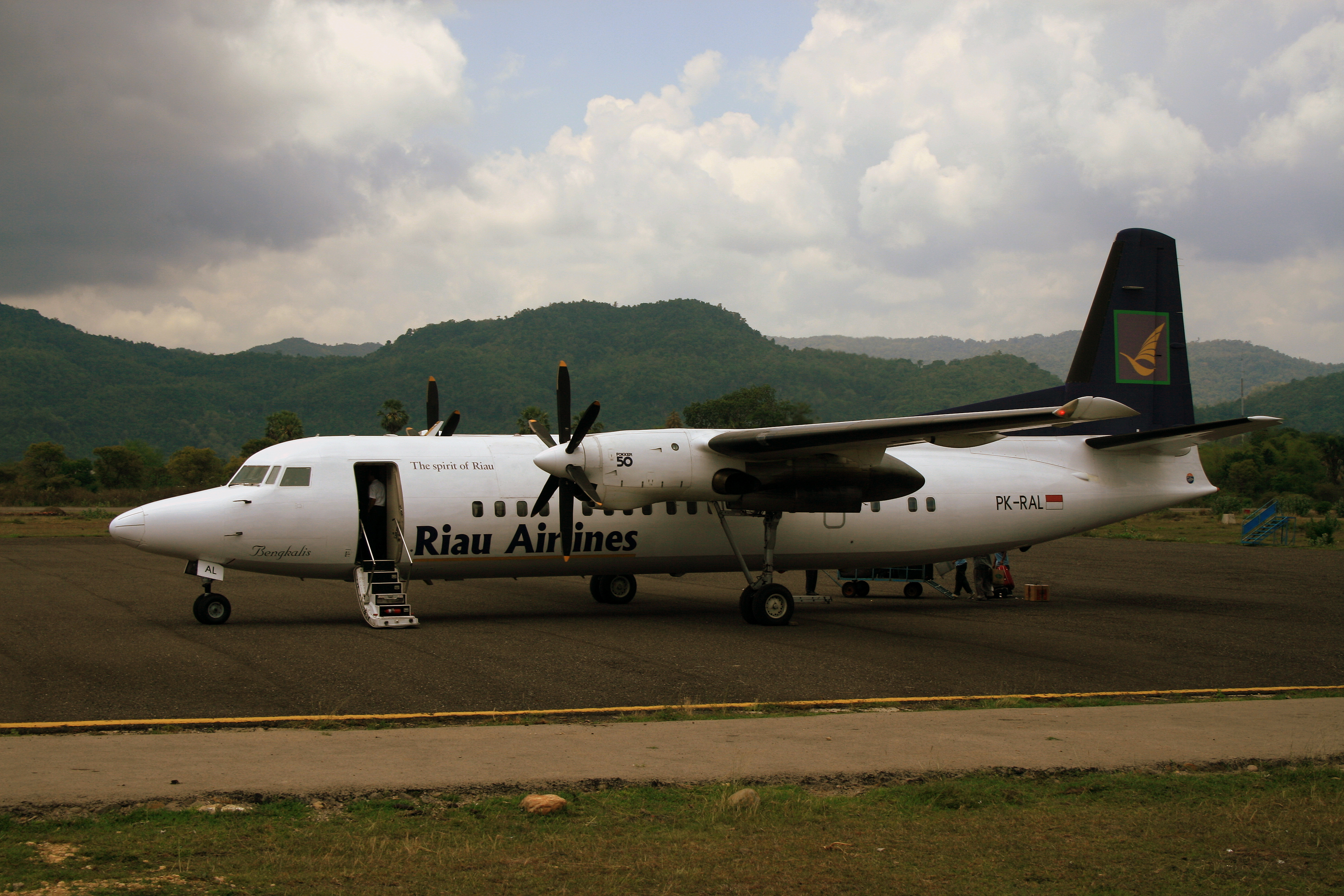
Riau Airlines Fokker 50 at Labuan Bajo on the island of Flores

After acquiring a Boeing 737-500 with 120 seat configuration in January 2011, Riau Air served the following:

Indonesia
Airport	City
Hang Nadim Airport	Batam
Ngurah Rai Airport	Denpasar
H. Hasan Aroeboesman Airport	Ende
Binaka Airport	Gunung Sitoli
Soekarno—Hatta International Airport	Jakarta
Sentani Airport	Jayapura
Depati Parbo Airport	Kerinci
Komodo Airport	Labuan Bajo
Matak Airport	Matak
Polonia International Airport	Medan
Sultan Syarif Kasim II International Airport HUB	Pekanbaru
Achmad Yani Airport	Semarang
Juanda International Airport	Surabaya

Malaysia
Airport	City
Kuala Lumpur International Airport	Kuala Lumpur
Malacca International Airport	Malacca

Singapore
Airport	City
Changi Airport	Singapore

== Proposed destinations ==
- Sampit - H. Asan Airport
- Pangkalanbun - Iskandar Airport
- Putussibau - Pangsuma Airport
- Ranai - Ranai Airport
- Pandeglang - Tanjung Lesung Airport

== Fleet ==
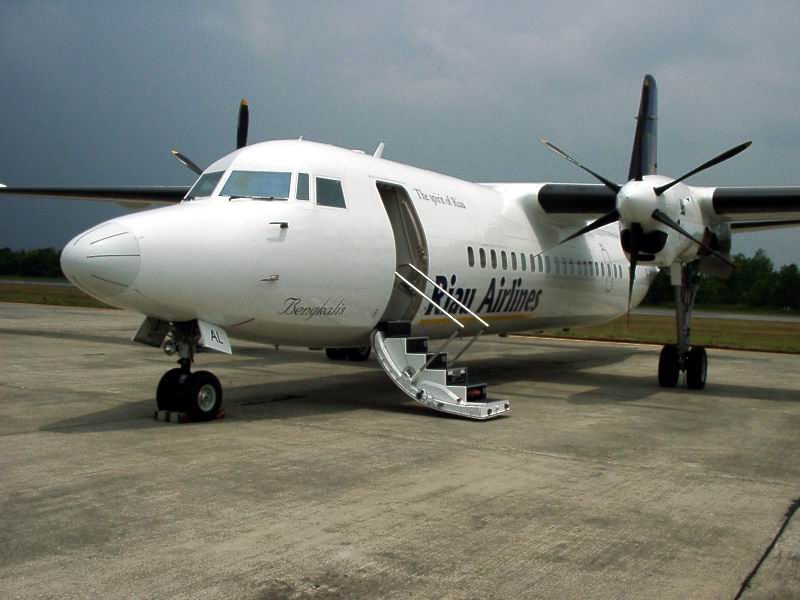
A Riau Airlines Fokker 50

At the times of operation, Riau Airlines fleet consisted of the following aircraft:

Riau Airlines fleet
Aircraft	Total	Introduced	Retired
Boeing 737-500	1	2010	2011
Avro RJ100	2	2008	2010
Fokker 50	5	2002	2011
