= Kalstar Aviation =

Indonesian airline

IATA	ICAO	Call sign
KD	KLS	KALSTAR
- Founded: 2000
- Ceased operations: 30 September 2017
- Hubs: Juanda International Airport; Supadio International Airport; Temindung Airport
- Fleet size: 12
- Destinations: 18
- Headquarters: Villa Melati Mas, Serpong, South Tangerang, Indonesia; Samarinda office: Samarinda Airport, Gatot Subroto Road, Samarinda
- Key people: Andi Masyhur (CEO)
- Website: www.kalstaronline.com

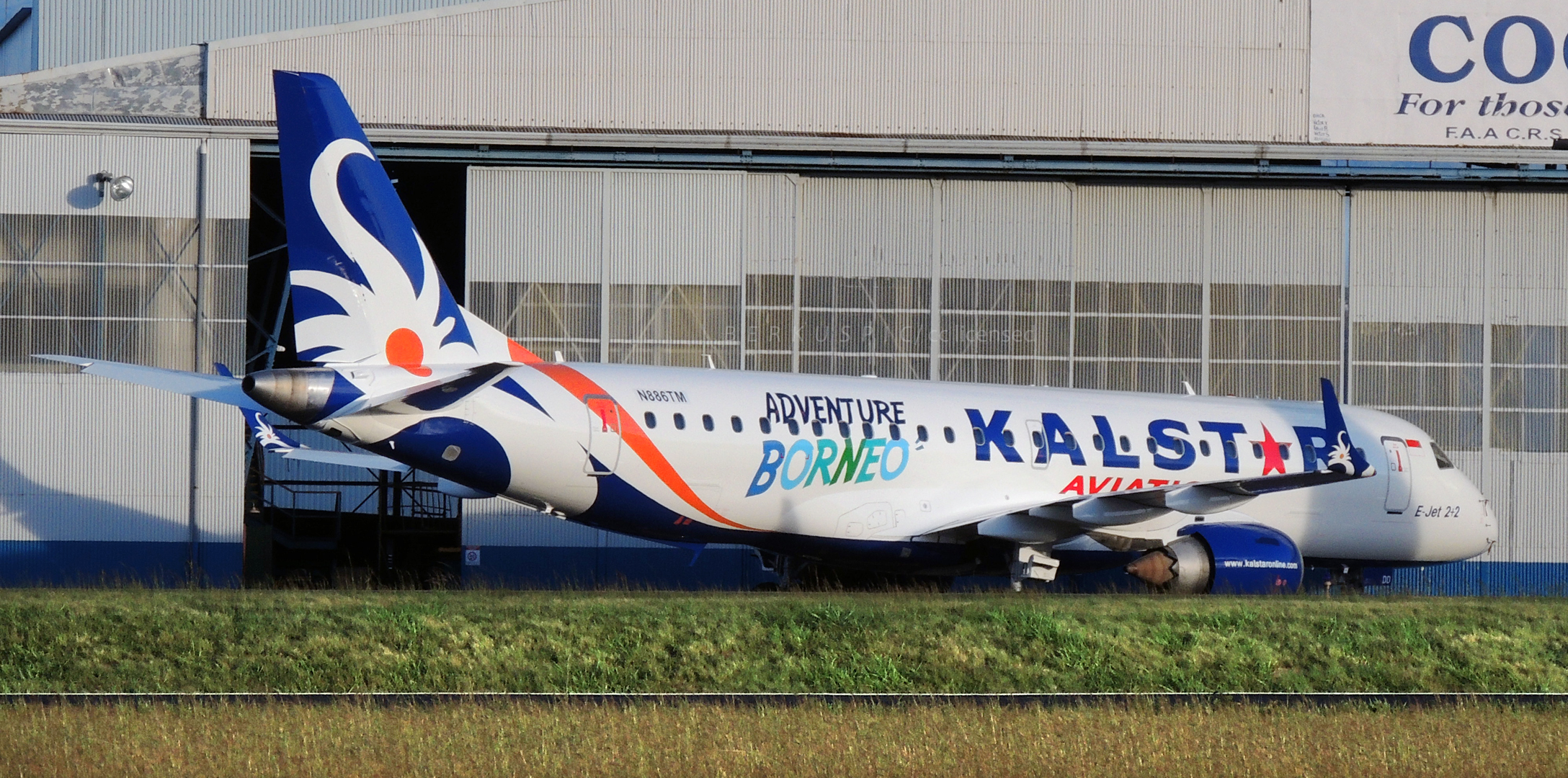
A Kalstar Aviation Embraer 190

Kalstar Aviation was an airline based in Serpong, Indonesia. The airline was founded as "Kalstar Tour-Travel Co., Ltd" in Samarinda in December 1993 by Andi Masyhur.

== History ==
Masyhur purchased the airline's first aircraft, an ATR 42, nicknamed KSE, in Bungay on 22 September 2008.

Although initially based in Samarinda, he formally began Kalstar Aviation in Serpong. On Kalstar Samarinda's maiden voyage, the airline flew from Samarinda to Tarakan, and later on to Nunukan. The airline grew quickly. By 2010, it had added another two ATR 42s to its fleet.

In 2013, Kalstar Aviation carried over 1 million passengers. All Kalstar Aviation aircraft carry the "bird" livery on the vertical stabiliser, introduced in the late 2008.

Kalstar Aviation launched the airline's mobile application, dubbed KALSTAR Mobile. Passengers can use the application to check flight arrivals and departures, and check in for their flights. The airline also provides in-flight magazine Kalstar.

On September 30, 2017, Kalstar Aviation has been forced to stops all of its flights inline with the letter of Transportation Ministry for not improving its management in technical and finance matters. No timeframe was given for the airline resuming its flights.

== Destinations ==
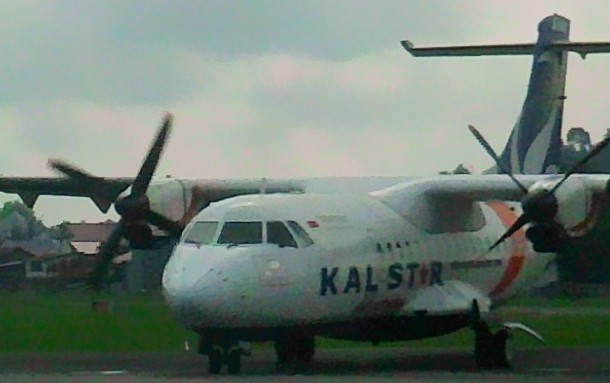
KSE, an ATR-42, the first aircraft of Kalstar Aviation, at Samarinda

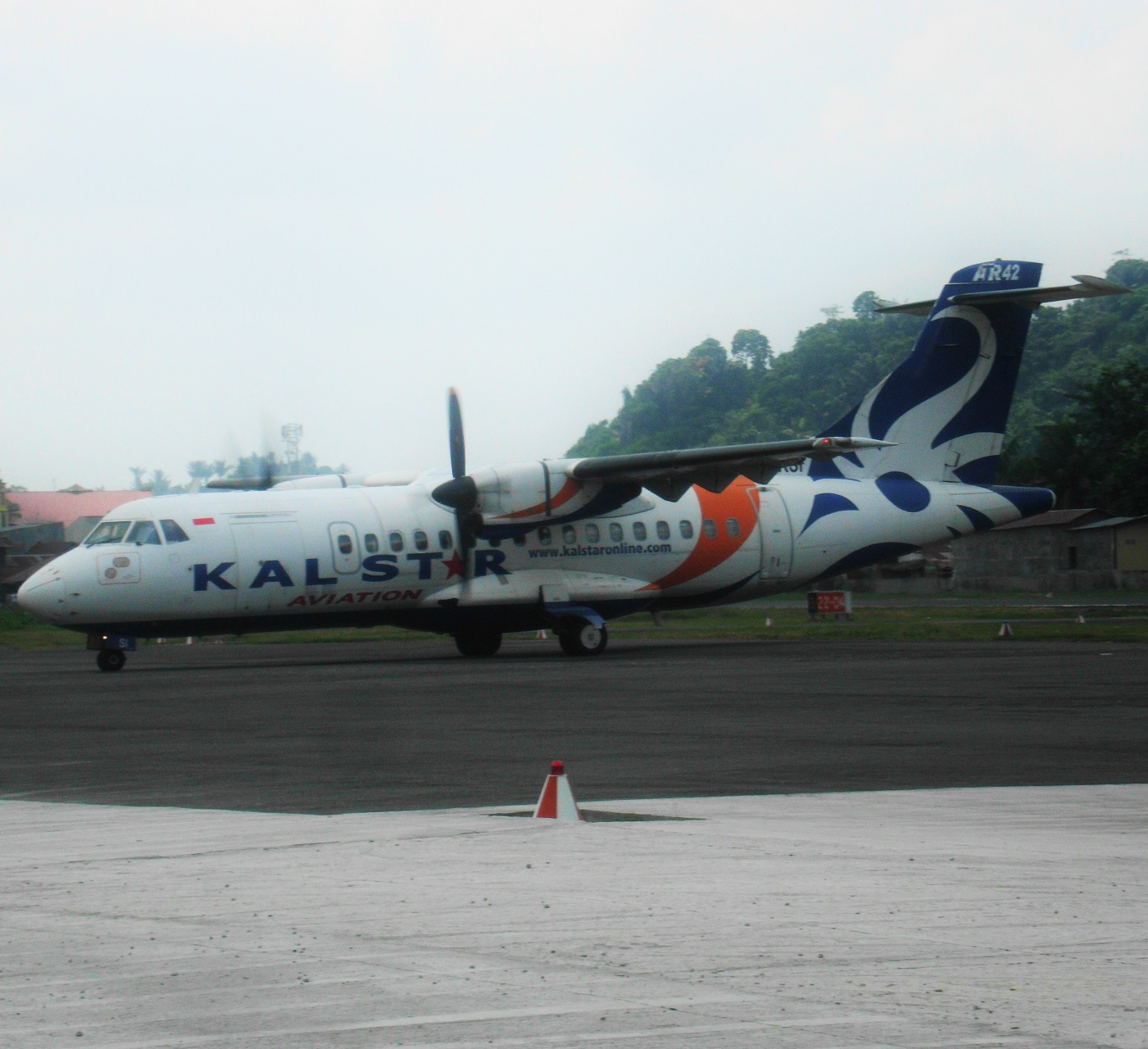
KSI, an ATR-42, the carrier's second aircraft, at Samarinda

=== Indonesia ===
==== Java ====
- Jakarta, Soekarno Hatta International Airport
- Bandung, Husein Sastranegara International Airport
- Surabaya, Juanda International Airport
- Semarang, Achmad Yani International Airport

==== Kalimantan ====
- Balikpapan, Sultan Aji Muhammad Sulaiman Airport
- Banjarmasin, Syamsudin Noor Airport
- Berau, Kalimarau Airport
- Ketapang, Ketapang Airport
- Kota Baru, Gusti Syamsir Alam Airport
- Malinau, Robert Atty Bessing Airport
- Melak, Melalan Airport
- Nunukan, Nunukan Airport
- Pangkalan Bun, Iskandar Airport
- Pontianak, Supadio Airport
- Putussibau, Pangsuma Airport
- Samarinda, Temindung Airport (passenger + cargo)
- Sampit, Sampit Airport
- Sintang Regency, Sintang Airport
- Tanjung Selor, Tanjung Harapan Airport
- Tarakan, Juwata International Airport

==== Nusa Tenggara ====
- Denpasar Ngurah Rai International Airport
- Maumere Frans Seda Airport
- Kupang El Tari Airport
- Ende H. Hasan Aroeboesman Airport

== Fleet ==
Throughout operations, Kalstar Aviation fleet consists of the following aircraft:

KalStar Aviation fleet
Aircraft	Total	Introduced	Retired	Notes
ATR 42-300	2	2008	2017	
ATR 42-320	1	2010	2017	
ATR 42-500	1	2015	2017	
ATR 72-500	2	2014	2017	
ATR 72-600	3	2013	2017	
Boeing 737-300	1	2013	2016	
Boeing 737-500	2	2011	2015	
Embraer ERJ-190LR	1	2015	2017	
Embraer ERJ-195LR	2	2015	2017	One was written off.

== Accidents and incidents ==
- On December 21, 2015, Embraer 195LR registered PK-KDC overshot the runway at Kupang Airport while performing duty as KD678 from Ende to Kupang. Everyone on board survived the incident.
- On 16 April 2016, ATR 72-500 PK-KSC of Kalstar Aviation flight KD931 was climbing from Banjarmasin to Kotabaru when the crew reported a fire indication in the number 1 engine. The plane returned and landed at Banjarmasin about 15 minutes later. The aircraft stopped on the runway and was evacuated. There were no injuries. Indonesia's Ministry of Transportation confirmed the aircraft suffered an engine fire indication, and the engine was shut down.
