= Supadio International Airport =

Airport serving Pontianak, West Kalimantan, Indonesia

Supadio International Airport Bandar Udara Internasional Supadio
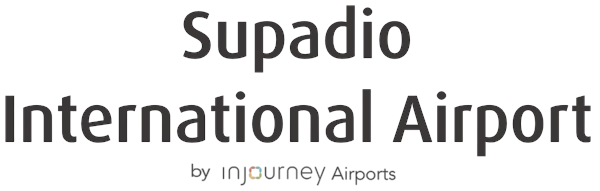

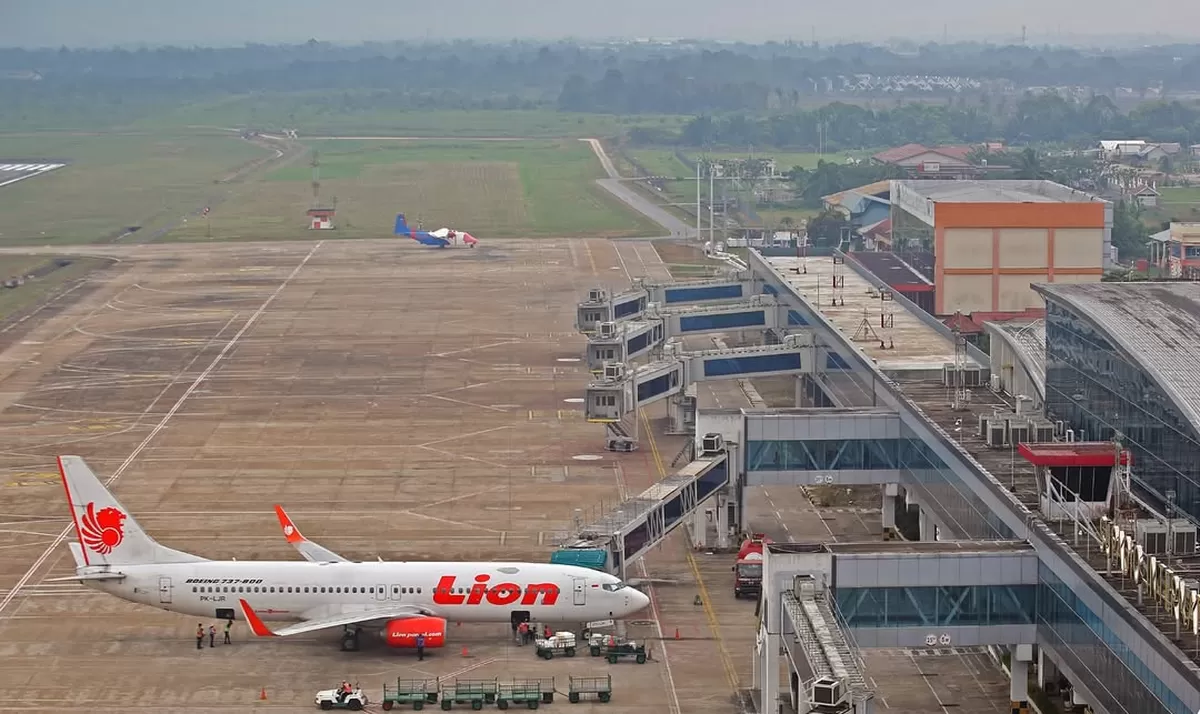
- IATA: PNK; ICAO: WIOO; WMO: 96581

Summary
- Airport type: Public / Military
- Owner: Government of Indonesia
- Operator: InJourney Airports
- Serves: Pontianak
- Location: Sungai Durian, Kubu Raya Regency, West Kalimantan, Indonesia
- Time zone: WIB (UTC+07:00)
- Elevation AMSL: 10 ft (3.0 m)
- Coordinates: 00°09′02″S 109°24′14″E
- Website: www.supadio-airport.co.id

Maps
- Kalimantan region in Indonesia

- Location of airport in Kubu Raya Regency, West Kalimantan, Indonesia PNK/WIOO (Indonesia) PNK/WIOO (Southeast Asia) PNK/WIOO (Asia)

Runways
Direction	Length		Surface
Direction	m	ft	Surface
15/33	2,600	8,530	Asphalt

Statistics (2024)
- Passengers: 2,387,536 (▲2.3%)
- Cargo (tonnes): 30,627 (▲17.3%)
- Aircraft movements: 19,112 (▼1.3%)
- Source: DGCA

Supadio International Airport (IATA: PNK, ICAO: WIOO), formerly Sungai Durian Airport, is an international airport serving Pontianak, West Kalimantan, Indonesia. The airport is located in Kubu Raya Regency, about 17 kilometers (11 mi) from the center of Pontianak and serves as the main gateway to both the city and the province of West Kalimantan. The airport is named after Lieutenant Colonel Supadio, an Indonesian Air Force officer who was one of the commanding officers of the air force base located at the airport. The airport operates regular flights to major Indonesian cities such as Jakarta, Semarang, and Surabaya, as well as to other Kalimantan cities like Banjarmasin and Balikpapan. It also serves rural destinations in the interior of West Kalimantan. For international flights, the airport serves Kuala Lumpur and Kuching in Malaysia as well as Singapore.

It was named the best airport in Asia-Pacific in 2020 (2 to 5 million passengers per annum) by Airports Council International.

The airport shares its facilities, including the runway, with Supadio Air Force Base, a Type-A airbase operated by the Indonesian Air Force. The base hosts two key squadrons: the 1st Air Combat Squadron, which operates a fleet of 18 Hawk 109/209 aircraft, and the 51st UAV Squadron, which operates a fleet of CAIG Wing Loong. Due to its proximity to the Malaysian border and the South China Sea, Supadio Air Force Base holds significant strategic importance for national defense and regional security.

== History ==
=== Colonial era ===
Before the airport was constructed, the area was covered in dense jungle. With the economic development of communities around Kampung Sungai Durian—particularly in the Sungai Durian Motor Port area—the flow of transportation along the Kapuas River increased rapidly. Traffic congestion also intensified following the opening of the road from the Simpang Tiga junction to Pontianak, resulting in heavier traffic both on the Kapuas River and on land routes. Observing and considering the increasingly congested transportation flows around the Sungai Durian area, the Dutch East Indies government began to seek alternative modes of transport to alleviate the congestion on the Kapuas River. The Dutch authorities subsequently reached an agreement with the Pontianak Sultanate to construct the airfield in that area. Another key consideration for building the airfield was strategic defense, namely to maintain Dutch control in West Kalimantan amid the growing Japanese threat and the rising independence sentiment in the region at the time. In preparation for the construction, engineers from the Netherlands were brought to Pontianak to survey and study the area.

Construction of the airport began in 1940. However, before the airfield was completed, the Pacific War—part of World War II—broke out in 1941. The Japanese bombed and strafed the airfield in December 1941, forcing local residents to flee. In early 1942, Japanese forces launched the invasion of the Dutch East Indies. The Dutch retreated, and the unfinished airfield was subsequently captured by the Japanese. During the occupation, construction of Sungai Durian Airfield was continued and eventually completed by the Japanese, using romusha labor. The airfield was intended to strengthen Japan’s air power in West Kalimantan by accommodating military aircraft to support various operations against Allied forces. Throughout the war the Japanese stationed their aircraft at the airbase. The airfield was one of many sites of the Pontianak massacre from late 1944 to early 1945, during which ethnic Chinese suspected of conspiring against the Japanese were beheaded and buried in mass graves they had been forced to dig themselves. Near the end of the war, between June and August 1945, the airfield was bombed by the United States Army Air Forces (USAAF) to neutralize the runway, rendering the airfield inoperative.

After Japan’s surrender in 1945, the airfield was taken over by the Netherlands Indies Civil Administration (NICA). However, little effort was made to restore the facility, which had been heavily damaged by wartime bombing. By then, the airfield had fallen into severe disrepair, with parts overgrown by forest and others converted into farmland.

=== Independence era ===
Following the Dutch recognition of Indonesia’s sovereignty, they withdrew from Pontianak and the airfield was taken over by Indonesian authorities. In 1951, efforts began to rebuild the war-torn facility. Over the following years, the airfield was gradually developed and expanded into a fully operational airport.

In the early 1960s, in preparation for Operation Dwikora—part of the Indonesia–Malaysia Confrontation, a military campaign aimed at opposing the formation of Malaysia—the airbase was upgraded due to its strategic significance and proximity to the Sarawak border. The apron and runway were upgraded to accommodate more military aircraft, and the number of personnel stationed at the airfield was increased. During the confrontation, the airbase served as a key base for operations against Commonwealth forces.

In 1965, the airfield was upgraded to accommodate Convair aircraft, and on 29 July 1965, Garuda Indonesia launched its inaugural flight between Pontianak and Jakarta. Previously, the airfield had only been capable of accommodating the Douglas DC-3 Dakota. By 1969, the airfield was already capable of accommodating aircraft such as the C-130 Hercules, and the road linking it to Pontianak had been improved and paved.

In the 1980s, the airport was renamed to its current name, in honor of Lieutenant Colonel Supadio, an Indonesian Air Force officer who had been stationed at the airbase. Supadio tragically died in an airplane crash alongside Colonel Nurtanio Pringgoadisurjo in Bandung in 1966.

International services began in the 1970s with flights to Kuching in neighboring Sarawak, operated by Merpati Nusantara Airlines. In September 1985, Garuda Indonesia introduced flights to Singapore using the Fokker F28. In late October 1989, Malaysia Airlines launched services between Kuching and Pontianak, operating three times a week until the early 2000s. These international routes were suspended in 1998 during the Asian financial crisis. However, flights to Kuching resumed in mid-1999 and were subsequently operated by Batavia Air, Kalstar Aviation, and Xpress Air, followed later by Wings Air and, more recently, AirAsia. In the early to mid-2010s, additional short-lived international routes included services to Singapore, operated by Batavia Air, and to Johor Bahru, operated by Xpress Air. AirAsia also launched flights to Kuala Lumpur in late March 2015, though these services were suspended during the COVID-19 pandemic in 2020.

Due to the absence of active international routes, the Ministry of Transportation officially revoked the airport’s international status on 2 April 2024. Following negotiations between the West Kalimantan provincial government and the Ministry of Transportation, as well as public demand from residents of Pontianak, the airport’s international status was reinstated on 4 June 2025. Within a few months, AirAsia resumed international services to Kuching and Kuala Lumpur, after a five-year suspension since the pandemic.

== Facilities and development ==
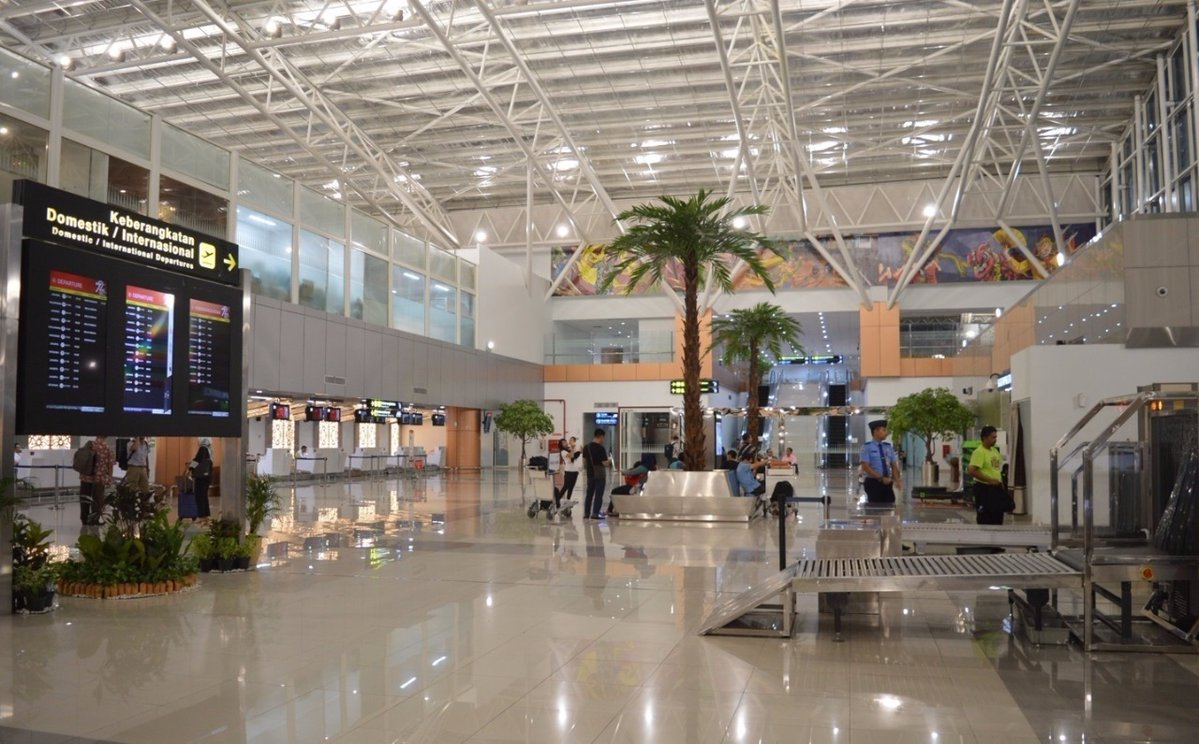
Check-in hall

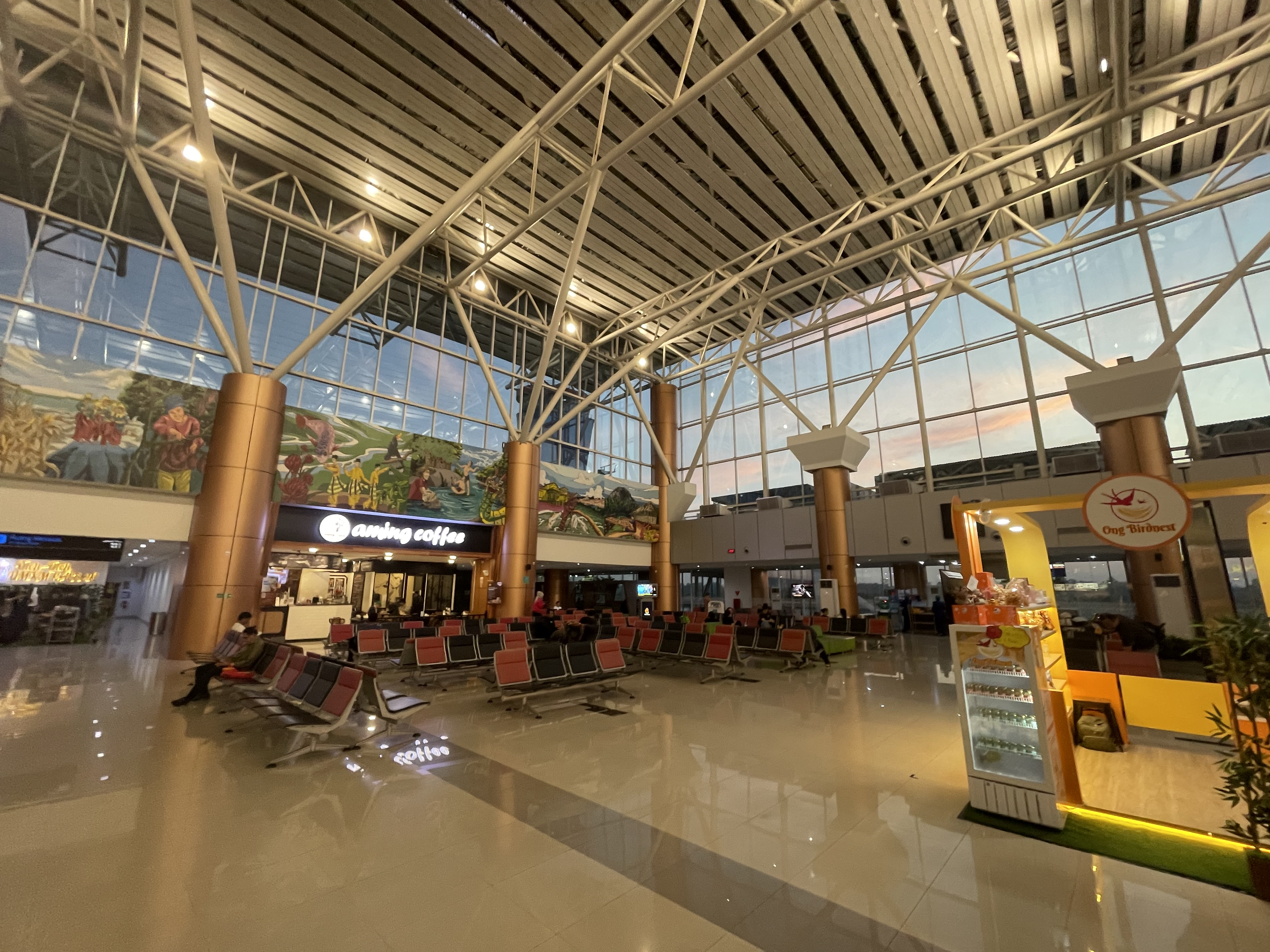
Boarding gate

A new terminal was constructed between 2011 and 2017 to replace the old facility, which had long suffered from chronic overcapacity. The previous terminal, covering only 6,700 m², was designed to accommodate just 875,000 passengers annually. The development was carried out in two phases. Phase I involved the construction of a temporary terminal with an area of 13,002 m², capable of handling over 1.5 million passengers per year, and was completed in June 2015. Phase II included the demolition of the original terminal and the expansion of the new facility based on the Phase I structure. The completed terminal is equipped with 40 check-in counters, four conveyor belts, seven lifts, five escalators, 42 CCTV cameras, and 39 Flight Information Display Systems (FIDS). The parking area was also expanded to accommodate up to 600 cars and 300 motorcycles. Following the completion of Phase II, the terminal has a total area of 13,683 m² and a capacity of 3.8 million passengers annually. The terminal’s architecture adopts an eco-airport and green building concept and is equipped with 8 gates. It was initially equipped with four jet bridges, which were later increased to seven in 2019. The project was completed in 2017 and inaugurated by then-President Joko Widodo on 28 December 2017. The total investment for the construction reached 350 billion rupiah.

In 2019, the runway was extended from 2,250 meters to 2,600 meters to accommodate larger aircraft. This upgrade allows the airport to handle aircraft such as the Boeing 737-900ER, whereas previously it was limited to smaller aircraft like the Boeing 737-400. Earlier, between 2010 and 2011, the runway had been widened from 30 meters to 45 meters. There are also plans to extend the runway up to 3,000 meters in the future to accommodate wide-body aircraft such as the Airbus A330 and the Boeing 777 and to anticipate the increasing air traffic in Pontianak. This would also enable the airport to operate direct flights to Jeddah, Saudi Arabia, for Hajj pilgrims in the future, eliminating the need to transit via Batam as is currently required. However, due to limited land availability for extending the existing runway, a proposal has been made to construct a new 3,000-meter by 60-meter runway parallel to the current one. Once completed, the existing runway would be converted into a parallel taxiway. An estimated 300 billion rupiah will be invested in the construction of the new runway.

After the completion of the new terminal in 2017, the airport was able to accommodate up to 3.8 million passengers annually; however, it had already served 3.1 million passengers in 2016. Under the future master plan, the passenger terminal will be further expanded to accommodate up to 5.5 million passengers annually. The apron will also be enlarged from its current area of 47,200 m² to 75,600 m², allowing it to handle more aircraft. The West Kalimantan government is also planning to construct a toll road linking Supadio International Airport with Kijing International Port. The project is currently under consideration and aims to enhance mobility and improve logistics flows, with an estimated investment of approximately 23.24 trillion rupiah.

== Airlines and destinations ==
=== Passenger ===
Airlines	Destinations
AirAsia	Kuala Lumpur–International, Kuching
Batik Air	Balikpapan, Jakarta–Soekarno-Hatta
Citilink	Jakarta–Soekarno-Hatta, Surabaya
Garuda Indonesia	Jakarta–Soekarno-Hatta
Lion Air	Batam, Jakarta–Soekarno-Hatta, Medan, (Note: Medan is the continuation of Batam flight with the same flight number.) Surabaya
Pelita Air	Jakarta–Soekarno-Hatta
Scoot	Singapore
Sriwijaya Air	Jakarta–Soekarno-Hatta
Super Air Jet	Bandung–Husein Sastranegara (begins 5 December 2026), Denpasar, Jakarta–Soekarno-Hatta, Semarang, Surabaya, Yogyakarta–International
Wings Air	Ketapang, Putussibau, Sintang

== Traffic ==
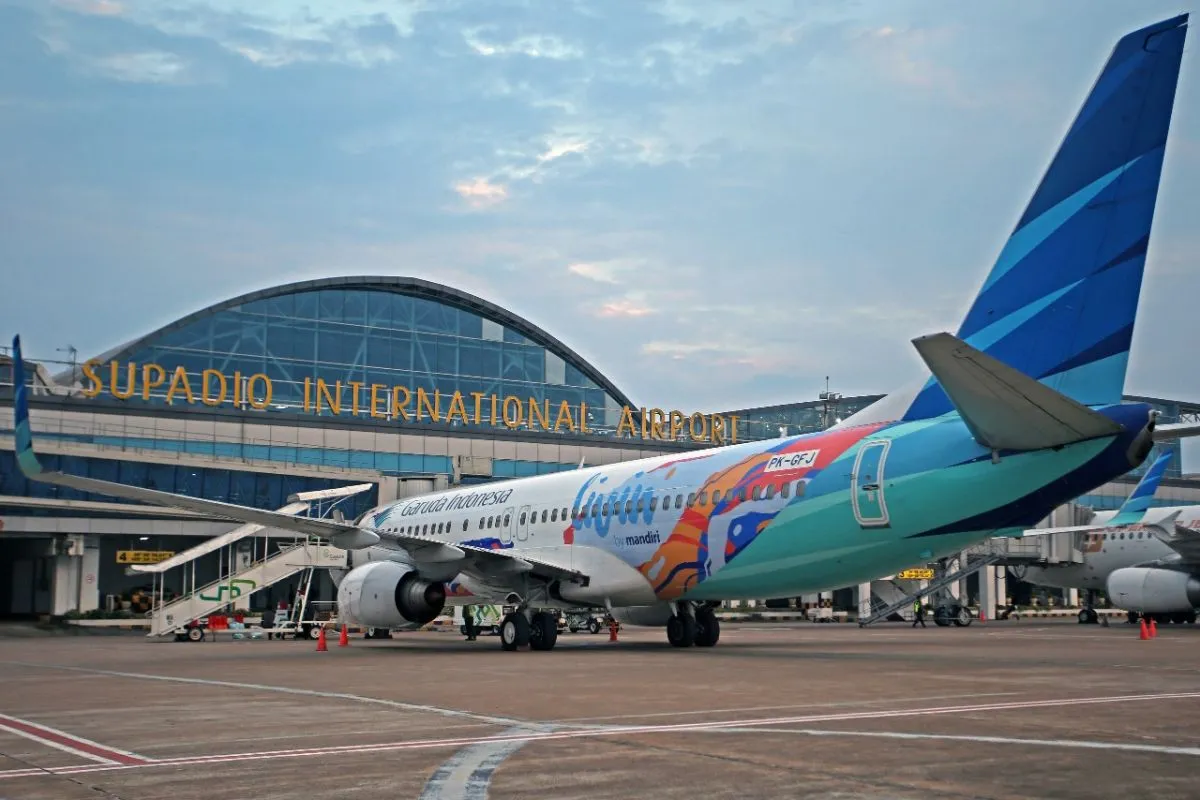
A Garuda Indonesia Boeing 737-800 at Supadio International Airport

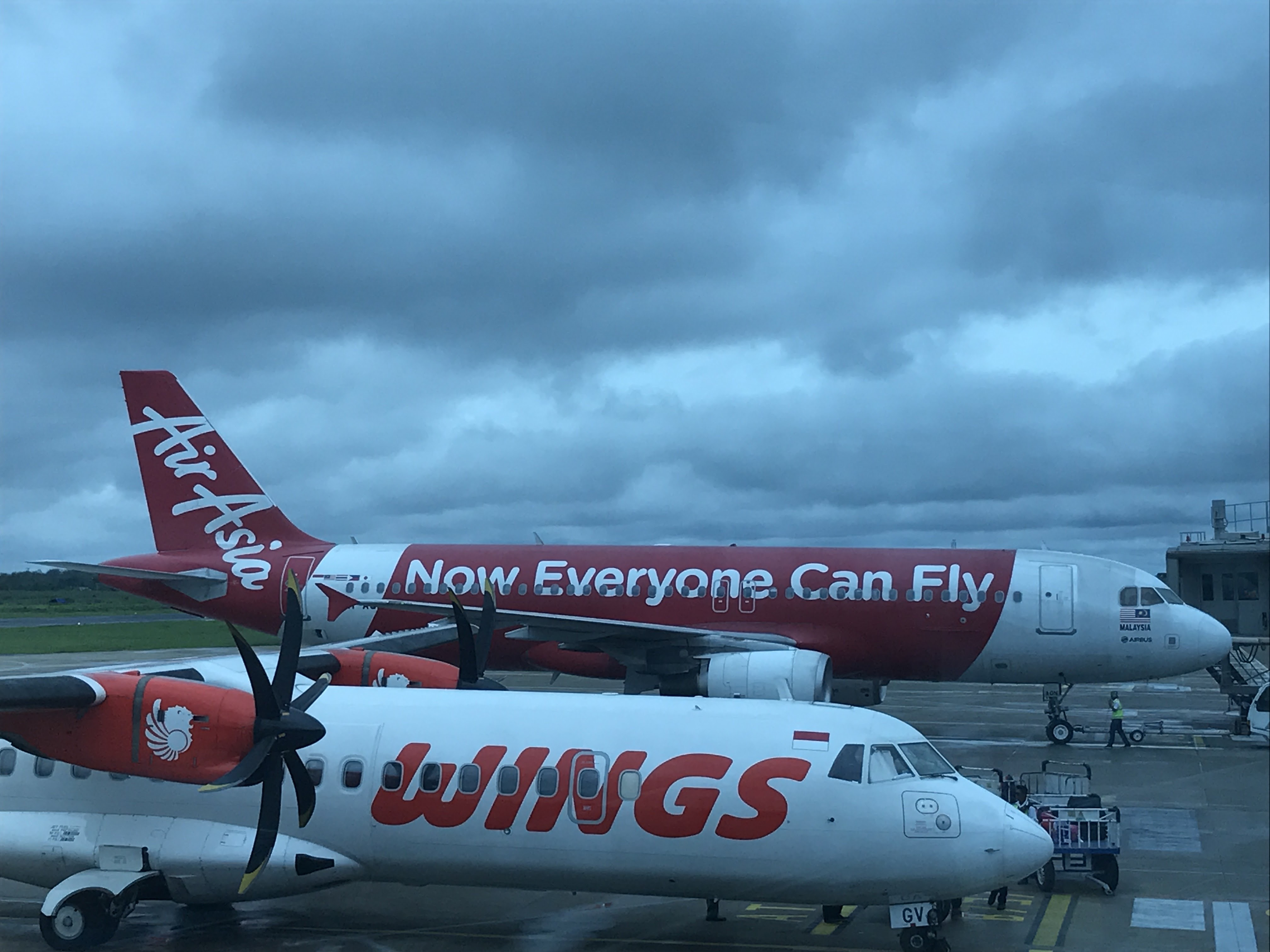
An AirAsia Airbus A320-200 and a Wings Air ATR 72-500 at Supadio International Airport, 2017

Annual passenger numbers and aircraft statistics
Year	Passengers handled	Passenger % change	Cargo (tonnes)	Cargo % change	Aircraft movements	Aircraft % change
2006	1,220,586	Steady	7,696	Steady	14,671	Steady
2007	1,365,515	▲11.9	8,957	▲16.4	15,297	▲4.3
2008	1,390,622	▲1.8	9,227	▲3.0	14,335	▼6.3
2009	1,581,908	▲13.8	9,454	▲2.5	15,366	▲7.2
2010	1,820,185	▲15.1	9,584	▲1.4	16,766	▲9.1
2011	2,132,940	▲17.2	10,524	▲9.8	19,994	▲19.3
2012	2,290,467	▲7.4	26,518	▲152.0	20,198	▲1.0
2013	2,387,322	▲4.2	7,729	▼70.9	22,779	▲12.
2014	2,503,958	▲4.9	17,305	▲123.9	23,622	▲3.7
2015	2,713,259	▲8.4	2,488	▼85.6	25,183	▲6.6
2016	3,182,267	▲17.3	16,399	▲559.1	28,722	▲14.1
2017	3,699,297	▲16.2	17,401	▲6.1	35,897	▲25.0
2018	4,067,203	▲9.9	23,429	▲34.6	39,655	▲10.
2019	3,159,542	▼22.3	19,622	▼16.2	29,755	▼25.0
2020	1,342,299	▼57.5	20,463	▲4.3	16,553	▼44.4
2021	1,052,283	▼21.6	30,983	▲51.4	13,098	▼20.9
2022	2,122,282	▲101.7	31,724	▲2.4	20,135	▲53.7
2023	2,334,090	▲10.0	26,113	▼17.7	19,363	▼3.8
2024	2,387,536	▲2.3	30,627	▲17.3	19,112	▼1.3
^{Source: DGCA, BPS}

== Accidents and incidents ==
- On 19 January 1973, Douglas C-47B PK-EHC of Trans Nusantara Airways crashed on landing and was destroyed in the subsequent fire. All four people on board escaped.
- On 22 November 2004, Sri Hardono, the captain of Garuda Indonesia flight 501, a Boeing 737-500 from Pontianak to Jakarta, was suddenly ill shortly after take-off. Hardono immediately asked permission to the air traffic control to return to the airport. Hardono died shortly after the emergency landing while still in the cockpit. Heart attack was the cause of illness and death. Due to the incident, the airport was temporarily closed for 40 minutes. There were no other injuries or fatalities in this incident.
- On 2 November 2010, Lion Air flight 712, operated by Boeing 737-400 PK-LIQ, overran the runway on landing, coming to rest on its belly. All 174 passengers and crew evacuated by the evacuation slides, with few injuries reported.
- On 1 June 2012, a Sriwijaya Air Boeing 737-400 skidded off the runway in heavy rain. No injuries were reported, but the plane sustained damage beyond repair.
