= Rahadi Oesman Airport =

Airport in Ketapang, Kalimantan, Indonesia

Rahadi Oesman Airport Bandar Udara Rahadi Oesman
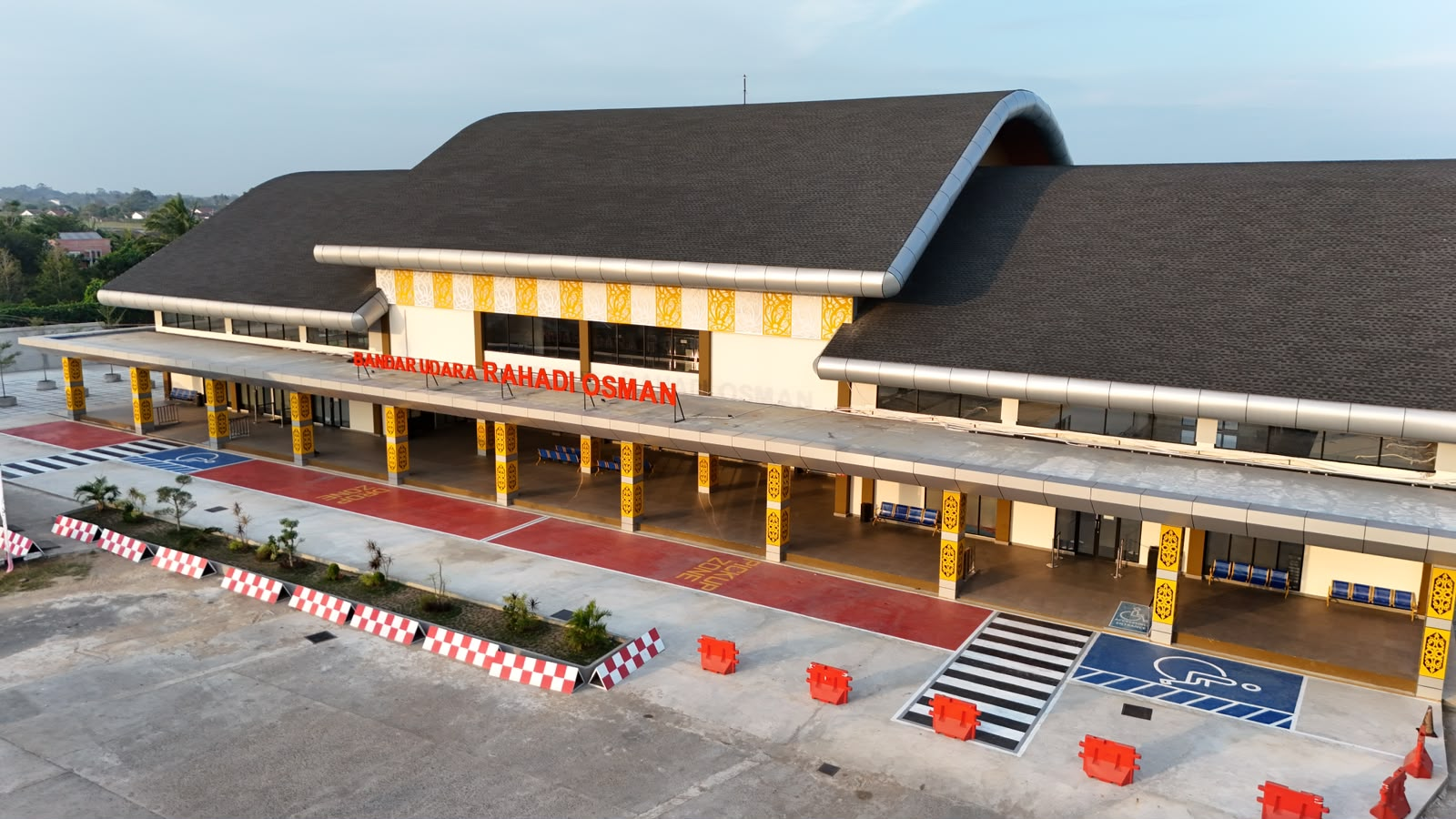
- IATA: KTG; ICAO: WIOK

Summary
- Airport type: Public
- Owner: Government of Indonesia
- Operator: Directorate General of Civil Aviation
- Serves: Ketapang
- Location: Ketapang, Ketapang Regency, West Kalimantan, Indonesia
- Time zone: WIB (UTC+07:00)
- Elevation AMSL: 14 m (46 ft)
- Coordinates: 01°48′59″S 109°57′48″E

Map
- Location of airport in Indonesia

Runways
Direction	Length		Surface
Direction	m	ft	Surface
17/35	1,650	5,413	Asphalt

Statistics (2024)
- Passengers: 137,005 (▼1.11%)
- Cargo (tonnes): 154.72 (▼32.71%)
- Aircraft movements: 2,254 (▼8.67%)
- Source: DGCA

Rahadi Oesman Airport (IATA: KTG, ICAO: WIOK), formerly Kalinilam Airport, is a domestic airport serving Ketapang, the administrative seat of Ketapang Regency in West Kalimantan, Indonesia. The airport is named after Rahadi Oesman, a Ketapang freedom fighter who was killed during the Indonesian National Revolution. Located approximately 2 km (1.2 mi) from Ketapang town centre, it serves as the main gateway by air to Ketapang and the surrounding region. The airport currently offers flights to Jakarta, the national capital, as well as inter-Kalimantan services to Pontianak, the provincial capital of West Kalimantan, and Pangkalan Bun in Central Kalimantan. The airport previously also served routes to Semarang, Surabaya and Yogyakarta, although this route has since been discontinued.

== History ==
=== Construction and early history ===
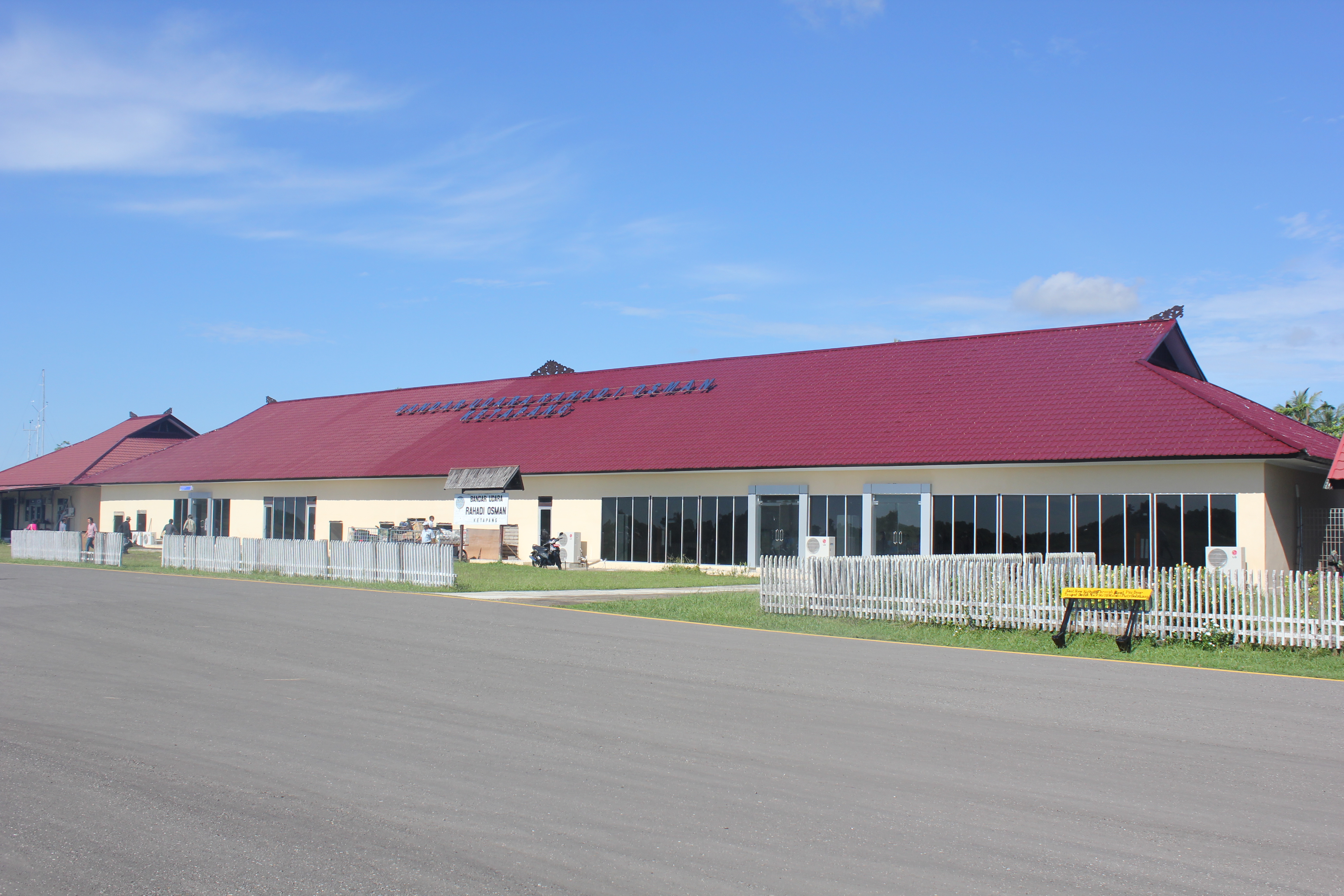
Facade of Rahadi Oesman Airport prior to its 2024 renovation

Planning for the establishment of an airfield in Ketapang began around 1957 following a proposal by the Ketapang Regency government to construct an airport in Kalinilam, after which the airfield was initially named. Development of the airfield was initially carried out through community self-help efforts (gotong royong), with the site occupying land temporarily made available by local residents. The airfield, constructed on a 700-by-70-metre site, commenced operations in July 1958. By around 1967, development of the airport had resumed, again involving local government employees and the wider community. At the time, the airfield was capable of accommodating small aircraft, including the Cessna 185 operated by Mission Aviation Fellowship (MAF). The aircraft was frequently chartered by the local government for travel between Ketapang and Pontianak, the provincial capital. However, the airfield did not yet have regular commercial air services.

Around 1969, Alcomin, a subsidiary of the American aluminum company Alcoa, conducted surveys for aluminum deposits in West Kalimantan, with its activities centered in Ketapang. With the approval of the local government, the company undertook improvements and expansion of Kalinilam Airfield to support its aviation operations, including extending the runway to accommodate larger aircraft such as the Fokker F27. However, Alcomin's operations in West Kalimantan were short-lived, and following the company's departure in the 1970s, the airfield saw only limited use.

The airport was reactivated and upgraded between 1974 and 1975 as part of a government initiative to establish 16 rural airstrips across Indonesia, aimed at improving air connectivity to remote and underserved areas. On 15 July 1976, Kalinilam Airfield was officially inaugurated by the Directorate General of Civil Aviation and designated as a rural airstrip (lapangan terbang perintis), marking the beginning of regular scheduled air services to Ketapang. Merpati Nusantara Airlines subsequently began operating pioneering services between Pontianak and Ketapang, as well as a route connecting Ketapang with Pangkalan Bun and Semarang. The Pontianak–Ketapang service was initially operated twice weekly, later increased to three times weekly, and eventually to daily service using de Havilland Canada DHC-6 Twin Otter aircraft. That same year, the airfield was renamed Rahadi Oesman Airport, in honor of Rahadi Oesman, a Ketapang freedom fighter who served as a messenger conveying news of Indonesia's independence to Ketapang. He was killed by Dutch forces in a skirmish on 7 December 1945.

Air services subsequently expanded with the entry of Deraya Air, which operated services connecting Ketapang with Pontianak, Pangkalan Bun, and Semarang. The airline also operated, for a period, a longer route linking Pontianak, Ketapang, Tanjung Pandan, Pangkalpinang, and Palembang. Additional services were operated by Dirgantara Air Service to supplement Merpati's flights. These services were subsequently discontinued.

Passenger numbers declined in 1982 and 1983, partly as a result of rising aviation fuel prices, which led to higher airfares. Competition from passenger ships also contributed to the decline, following the introduction of a twice-weekly Pontianak–Ketapang service with fares that were comparatively lower than those for air travel.

=== Contemporary history ===
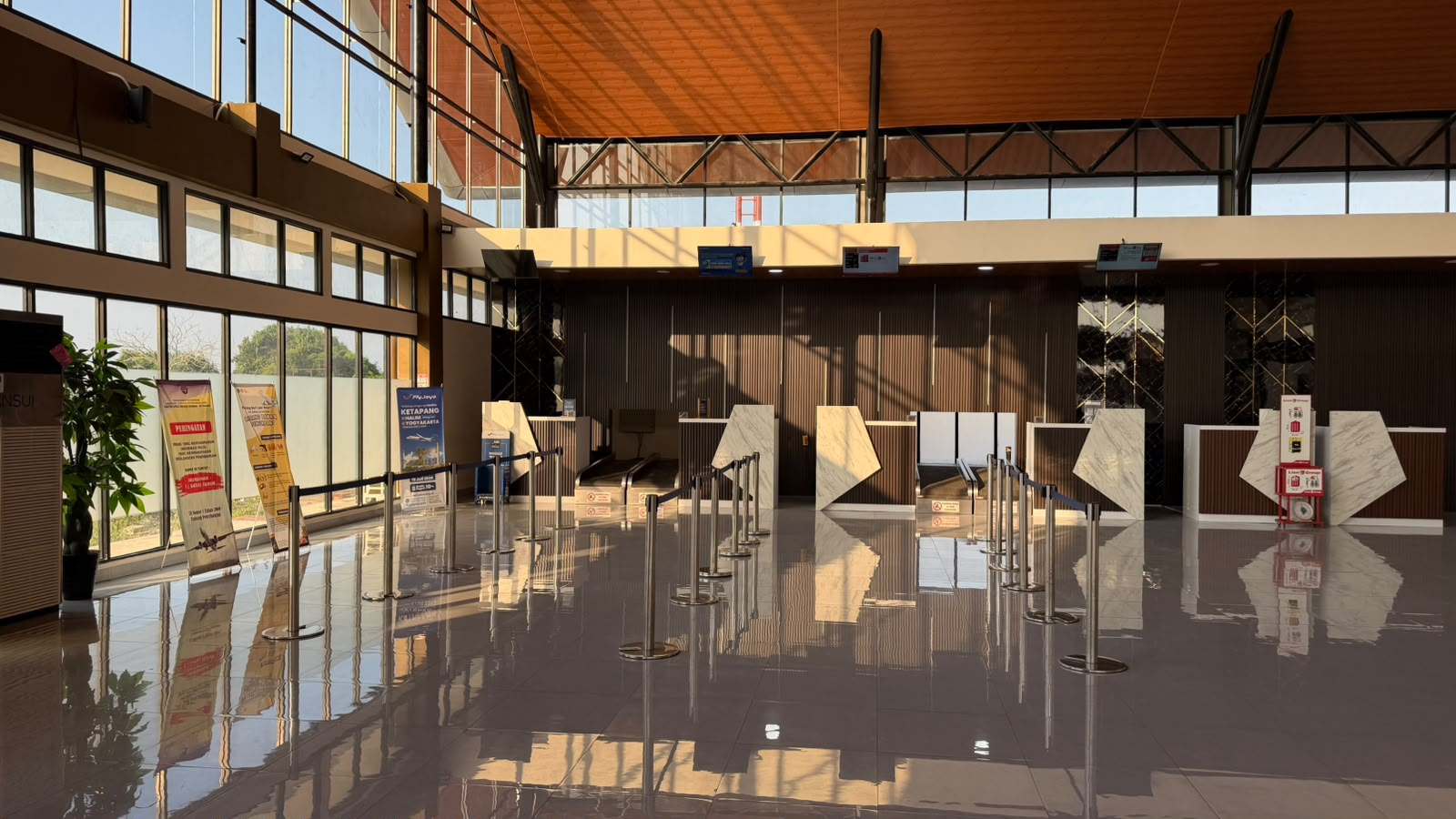
Check-in hall following the 2024 renovation

By the early 2000s, the airport was well connected to major cities across Indonesia, with services to several destinations in Kalimantan, including Pontianak, Pangkalan Bun, and Sampit, as well as cities on Java such as Semarang and Surabaya. At the time, the airport was served by several airlines, including Kalstar Aviation, TransNusa, and Trigana Air Service. In 2011, Aviastar launched direct flights between Ketapang and Soekarno–Hatta International Airport in Jakarta, operating two to three flights per week. The service was discontinued in 2016 and briefly resumed in 2017 before being discontinued again. Aviastar subsequently ceased operations in 2020, with the COVID-19 pandemic contributing to the suspension of its services. After nine years without a direct service, the Ketapang–Jakarta route was reactivated on 22 June 2026, when FlyJaya launched flights to Halim Perdanakusuma International Airport. FlyJaya subsequently also introduced a new route between Ketapang and Adisutjipto Airport in Yogyakarta on 20 July 2026.

Due to growing passenger numbers, the airport has faced increasing capacity constraints, further compounded by limited land available for expansion and development. As a result, proposals have been put forward to relocate the airport to accommodate future passenger growth and provide greater scope for expansion. Potential sites considered for a new airport include Tempurukan in Muara Pawan District, approximately 26 km from the existing airport, and Riam Berasap in Sukadana District, North Kayong Regency, approximately 65 km from the existing airport.

== Facilities and development ==
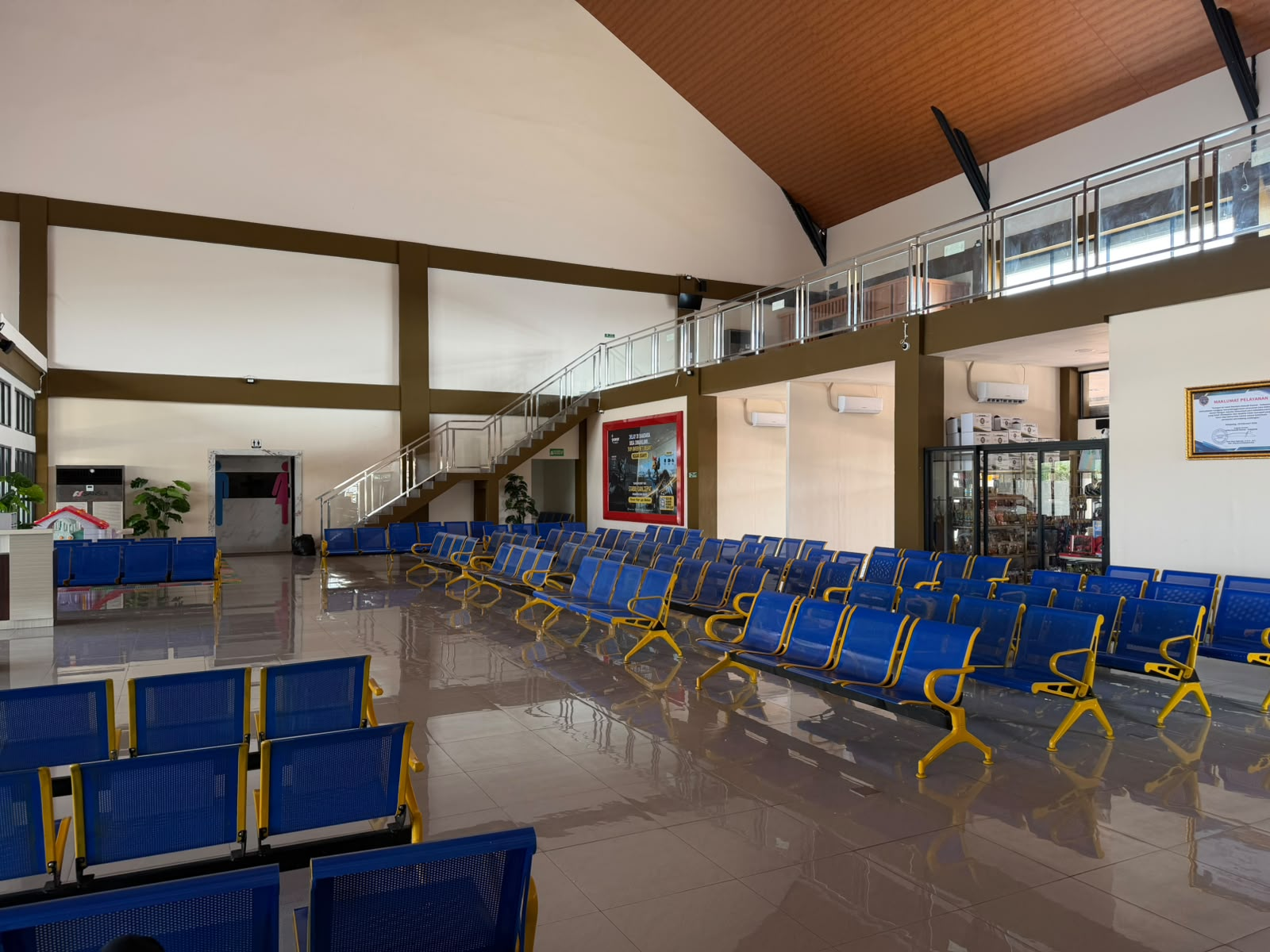
Boarding gate

The airport's current terminal covers an area of 2,100 m² and has an annual passenger handling capacity of up to 400,000. The airport is equipped with several modest passenger facilities, including check-in counters, departure gates, baggage claim areas, a children's playground, toilets, prayer rooms, and a souvenir shop. Between 2024 and 2026, the terminal underwent several renovations, including an expansion from its previous area of 1,800 m², which was considered insufficient to accommodate the airport's growing passenger volume. The terminal's interior and exterior were also refurbished, while several facilities were added or upgraded, including mechanical and electrical systems, CCTV cameras, and safety equipment. In total, the terminal's development and renovation cost approximately Rp20 billion. The airport also has an administration building covering 268.75 m², as well as an Aircraft Rescue and Fire Fighting (ARFF) building measuring 387 m².

On the airside, the airport has a single runway measuring 1,650 m × 30 m; however, only 1,400 m is currently usable due to obstacles at both ends of the runway, including residential buildings, trees, and utility poles. These restrictions limit the airport to regional aircraft such as the ATR 72. The airport is also equipped with two taxiways, measuring 75 m × 18 m, and a single apron measuring 224 m × 51 m. The government plans to further develop the airport's airside facilities by removing or mitigating obstacles around the runway to maximize its usable length and expanding the apron to accommodate additional aircraft. The runway is also planned to be extended by a further 500 m to allow the airport to accommodate narrow-body aircraft such as the Boeing 737 and Airbus A320.

== Airlines and destinations ==
Airlines	Destinations
FlyJaya	Jakarta–Halim Perdanakusuma
Wings Air	Pangkalan Bun, Pontianak

== Statistics ==
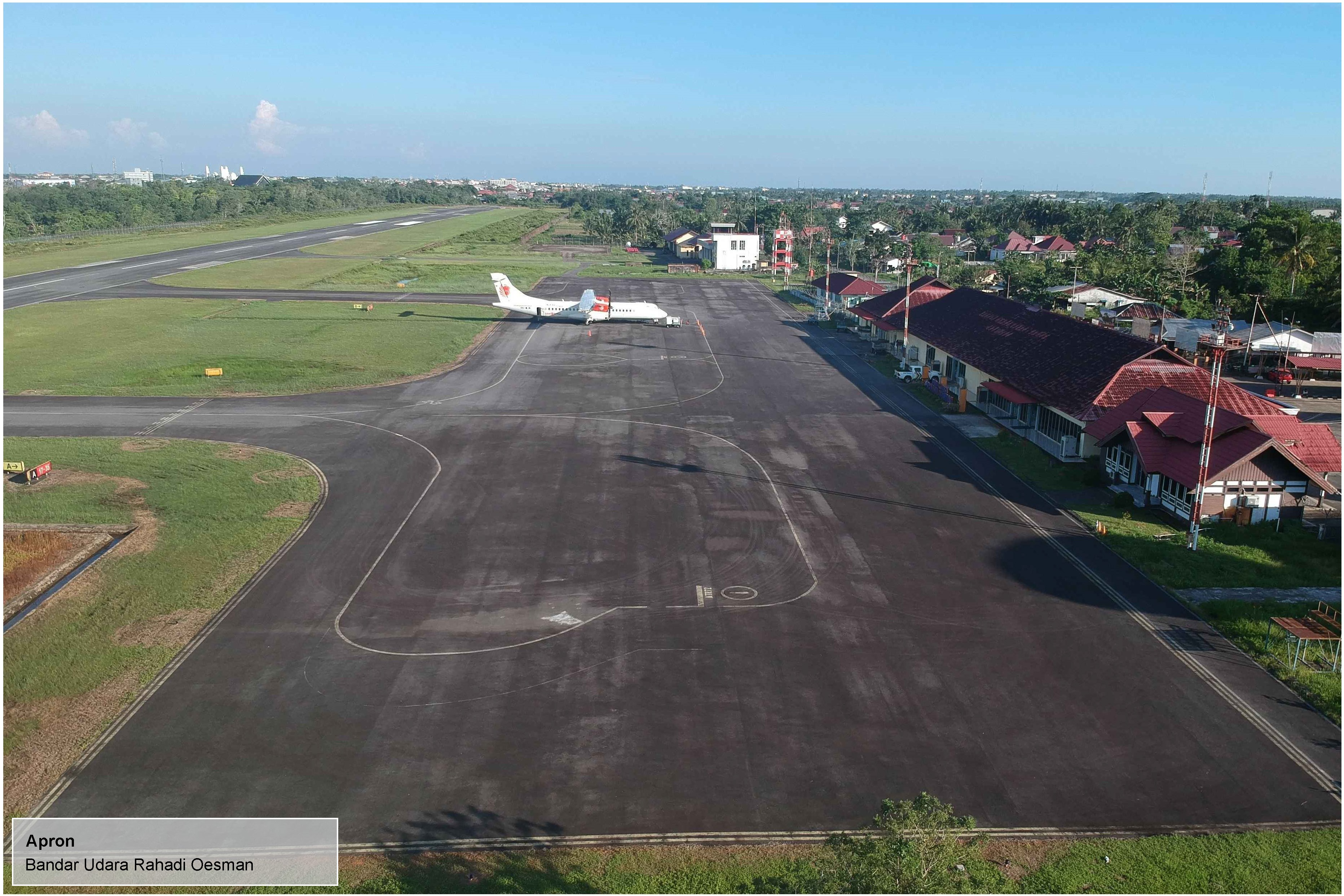
Apron view of the airport, showing a Wings Air ATR 72 on standby

Annual passenger numbers and aircraft statistics
Year	Passengers handled	Passenger % change	Cargo (tonnes)	Cargo % change	Aircraft movements	Aircraft % change
2006	88,221	Steady	418.66	Steady	3,025	Steady
2007	122,102	▲38.40	448.88	▲7.22	3,888	▲28.53
2008	81,212	▼33.49	288.00	▼35.84	2,236	▼42.49
2009	123,108	▲51.59	399.97	▲38.88	4,076	▲82.29
2010	149,070	▲21.09	355.02	▼11.24	4,428	▲8.64
2011	189,563	▲27.16	390.71	▲10.05	5,218	▲17.84
2012	219,277	▲15.67	451.16	▲15.47	5,705	▲9.33
2013	214,953	▼1.97	439.17	▼2.66	5,490	▼3.77
2014	271,459	▲26.29	363.07	▼17.33	6,673	▲21.55
2015	278,134	▲2.46	342.16	▼5.76	6,289	▼5.75
2016	317,902	▲14.30	84.55	▼75.29	7,854	▲24.88
2017	378,117	▲18.94	99.73	▲17.95	7,926	▲0.92
2018	440,522	▲16.50	250.36	▲151.04	8,216	▲3.66
2019	310,392	▼29.54	65.94	▼73.66	5,485	▼33.24
2020	138,895	▼55.25	12.94	▼80.38	2,810	▼48.77
2021	113,293	▼18.43	80.46	▲521.79	2,209	▼21.39
2022	145,717	▲28.62	179.92	▲123.61	2,482	▲12.36
2023	138,539	▼4.93	229.93	▲27.80	2,468	▼0.56
2024	137,005	▼1.11	154.72	▼32.71	2,254	▼8.67
^{Source: DGCA, BPS}

== Accidents and incidents ==
- On 31 December 2009, a Fletcher FU 24-950 operated by Sinar Mas Land on an aerial fertilisation flight from Pangkalpinang to Pangkalan Bun, with a scheduled stop at Ketapang, experienced mechanical failure shortly after takeoff from Rahadi Oesman Airport. The aircraft subsequently lost control and crashed into Agoesdjam Hospital, located approximately 2 km from the airport, killing both occupants. No one on the ground was injured, although part of the hospital's emergency room and a nearby Toyota Avanza were damaged in the crash.
