= Iskandar Airport =

Airport serving Pangkalan Bun, Central Kalimantan, Indonesia

Iskandar Airport Bandar Udara Iskandar
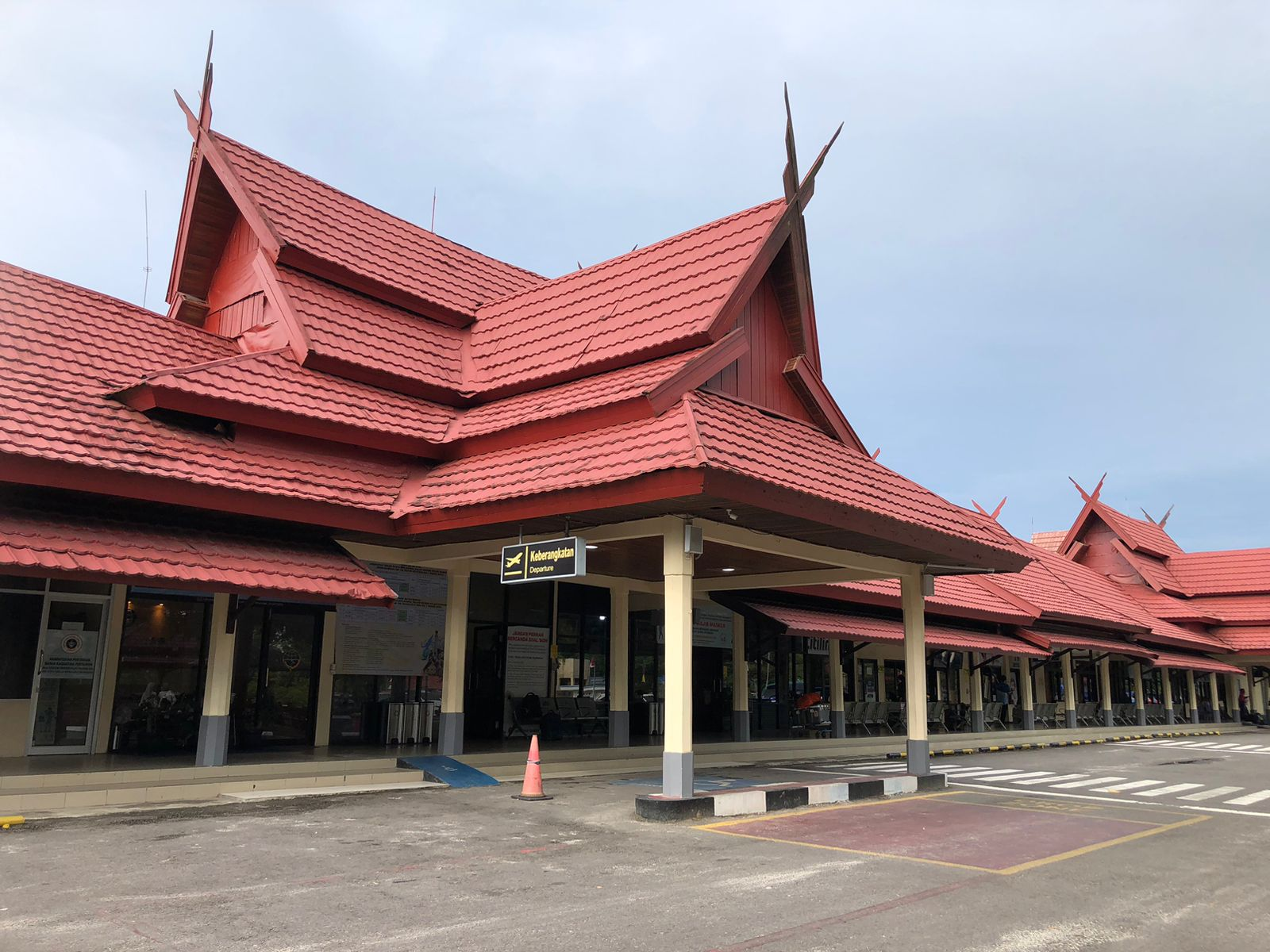
- IATA: PKN; ICAO: WAGI

Summary
- Airport type: Public / Military
- Owner: Indonesian Air Force
- Operator: Directorate General of Civil Aviation
- Serves: Pangkalan Bun
- Location: Pangkalan Bun, West Kotawaringin Regency, Central Kalimantan, Indonesia
- Time zone: WIB (UTC+07:00)
- Elevation AMSL: 75 ft (23 m)
- Coordinates: 2°42′18″S 111°40′23″E

Map
- Location of airport in Kalimantan PKN (Indonesia) PKN (Southeast Asia)

Runways
Direction	Length		Surface
Direction	m	ft	Surface
13/31	2,120	6,955	Asphalt

Statistics (2024)
- Passengers: 472,637 (▲31.4%)
- Cargo (tonnes): 629 (▼8.6%)
- Aircraft movements: 4,351 (▲1.0%)
- Source: DGCA

Iskandar Airport (IATA: PKN, ICAO: WAGI) is a domestic airport serving the town of Pangkalan Bun, the capital of West Kotawaringin Regency in Central Kalimantan, Indonesia. It is located approximately 5 kilometers (3 miles) from the city center. The airport is named after Iskandar, an Indonesian Air Force officer and guerilla fighter from Central Kalimantan. Iskandar Airport serves as the primary gateway to Pangkalan Bun and the nearby Tanjung Puting National Park, a renowned destination for orangutan conservation. Although the airport currently operates a limited number of routes, it offers regular flights to major Indonesian cities such as Jakarta, Semarang, and Surabaya.

In addition to serving civilian flights, Iskandar Airport is also home to Iskandar Air Force Base, a Type-C facility operated by the Indonesian Air Force. Remarkably, it is the largest air force base in Indonesia, covering a total area of 3,000.6 hectares—surpassing even Halim Perdanakusuma Air Force Base in Jakarta, which spans 1,700 hectares. Despite its size, only 200 hectares are actively used for military operations, while the remaining land is preserved as urban forest, jointly maintained by the air base and the local regency government. The base does not host a permanent squadron and primarily functions as a support facility for Indonesian Air Force flight activities.

== History ==
=== Colonial era ===
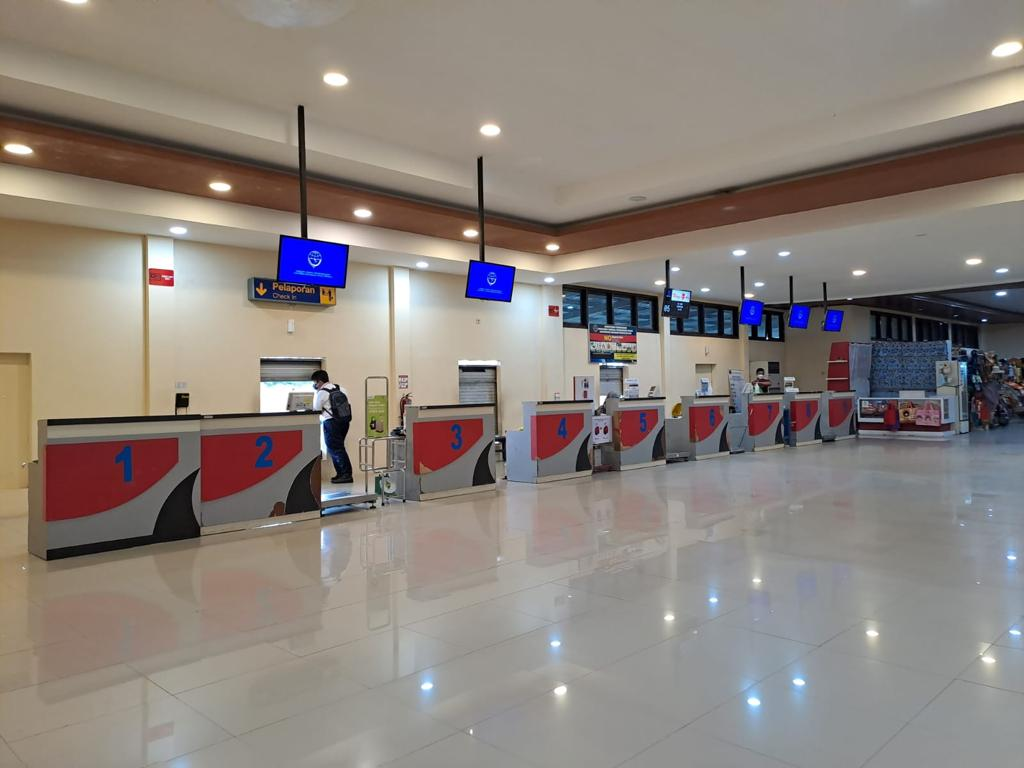
Check-in area

Iskandar Airport was originally constructed by the Dutch colonial government prior to the Pacific Theater of World War II, in anticipation of a potential Japanese invasion. It served as an airbase for the Royal Netherlands East Indies Army Air Force (ML-KNIL). Along with Oelin Airbase in Banjarmasin (now Syamsudin Noor Airport), it was one of two key strategic targets for the Japanese forces, as control of these bases would enable them to launch air attacks on Java—an essential part of their plan to neutralize Allied air power before their offensive on the island. In January 1942, anticipating the possibility of the base falling into enemy hands, the Dutch dispatched reinforcements to defend it. However, the defending forces were poorly equipped and consisted of troops from various units. Only ten brigades were stationed at the base, each comprising 18 soldiers, and the available air defense was limited to just two Lewis guns. Following the fall of Banjarmasin in February 1942, the remaining units at Kotawaringin Airfield were reinforced by the British Indian Army’s 2/15 Punjab Battalion, led by Lt. Col. M.C. Lane, who had arrived exhausted after a retreat from Miri and Kuching. On 24 February, a supply ship reached the airfield to deliver much-needed food and provisions. Despite these efforts, the Japanese forces eventually reached Kotawaringin in late March or early April and overcame the defenders. The base remained under Japanese occupation for three years until their surrender in 1945. It was subsequently reoccupied by Dutch colonial authorities.

On 17 October 1947, during the Indonesian National Revolution, a group of Indonesian Air Force commandos—composed of native Kalimantan soldiers and led by Tjilik Riwut—parachuted into Kotawaringin. Their mission was to seize control of the Kotawaringin Airfield in Pangkalan Bun and to establish a transmitter to broadcast the Proclamation of Indonesian Independence. This marked the first parachute operation in the history of the Indonesian Air Force. The mission was initiated under the orders of Air Force Commander Soerjadi Soerjadarma and the Governor of Kalimantan, Mohammad Noor. It later became the foundational event for the formation of Kopasgat, the Indonesian Air Force’s special forces unit. However, the operation ultimately ended in failure. After a month of guerrilla warfare, most of the commandos were either killed or captured by Dutch forces. Among those killed was Iskandar, a native of Sampit, who died in a shootout with Dutch troops on 23 November. His name was later honored in the naming of the airport after the end of the war.

=== Contemporary history ===
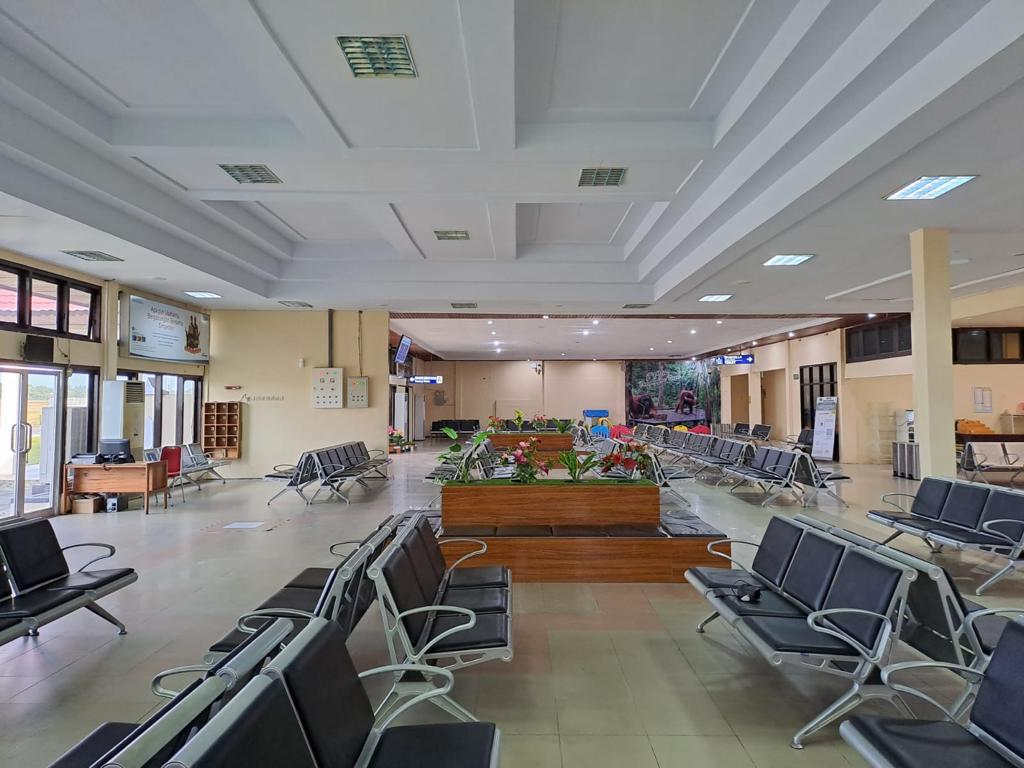
Boarding gate

Following Indonesia’s independence, the airfield was transferred to the Indonesian Air Force and integrated into Air Force Operations Command II (Koopsau II) as a Type-C base. As such, it primarily served as a forward operating base to support military operations during emergencies or potential conflicts. In the 1970s, West Kotawaringin Regency began to see significant development. With this growth came an increasing demand for faster and more efficient air transportation to support the region’s social and economic activities. Until then, residents had relied almost exclusively on sea transport for inter-island travel, including routes to Jakarta. To address this need, part of the airfield was converted in 1970 for civilian use. Commercial flights began operating from the airstrip, and the government formally designated a section of the base as a civilian airport. Although traffic remained modest, several airlines began including Pangkalan Bun in their flight routes.

Iskandar Airport served as one of the key operational centers during the search and recovery efforts following the crash of Indonesia AirAsia Flight 8501 on 28 December 2014 in the nearby Karimata Strait, off the coast of Pangkalan Bun. Shortly after the crash, the Indonesian National Search and Rescue Agency (BASARNAS) established a command post at the airport to coordinate the search operations. Once the crash was confirmed, Indonesian authorities prepared over 160 coffins in Pangkalan Bun in accordance with local customs, which emphasize the prompt and respectful handling of the deceased. After initial reception and identification procedures in Pangkalan Bun, the bodies were to be transported to Surabaya, East Java—the flight's point of origin—so they could be returned to their families.

== Facilities and development ==
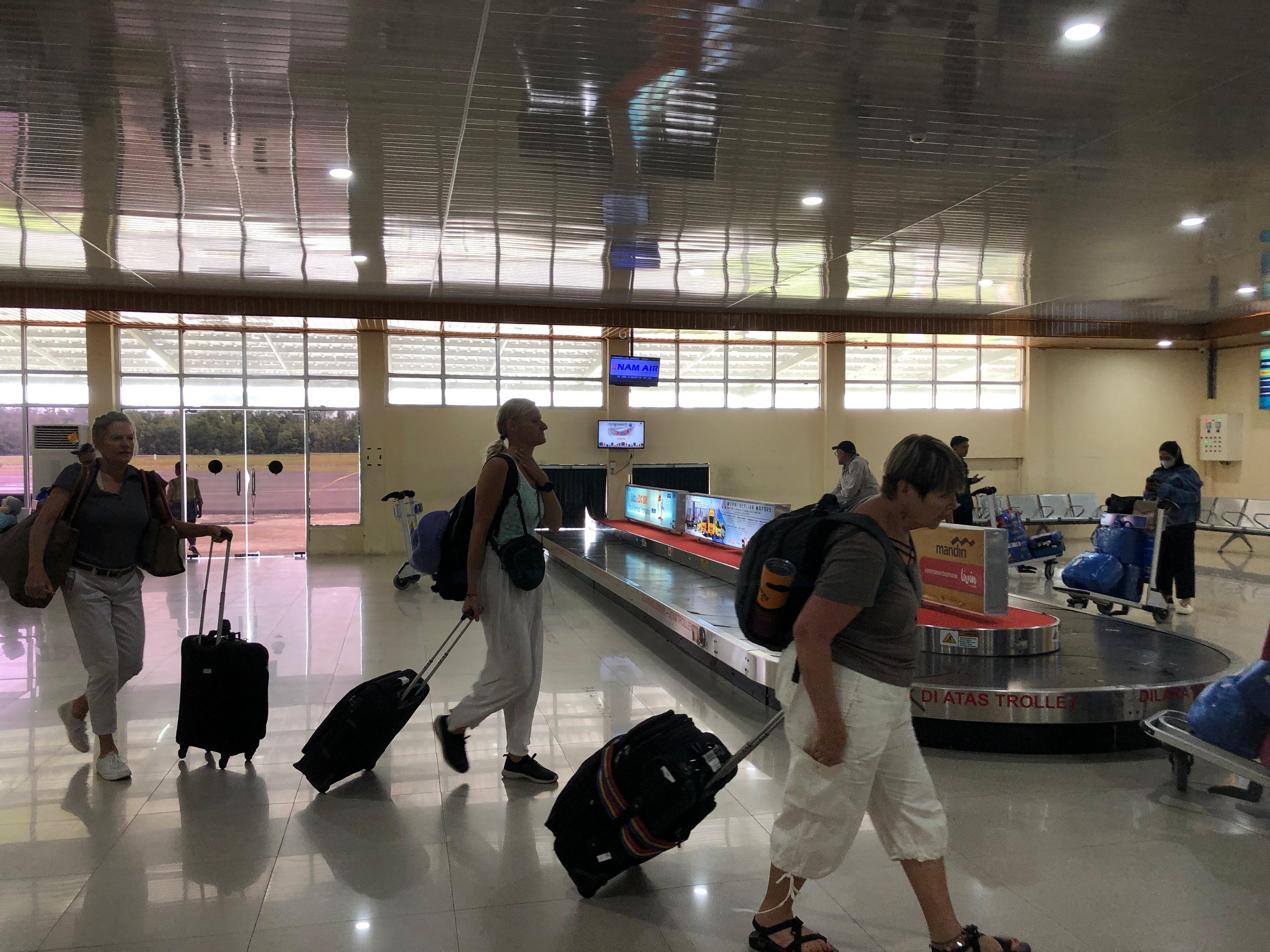
Baggage claim area

The airport covers a total area of 3,000.6 hectares, although only 200 hectares are currently utilized; the rest remains forested land. The passenger terminal spans 3,500 square meters and is designed in the traditional Kotawaringin Malay architectural style. The passenger terminal is equipped with a range of facilities, including check-in counters, boarding gates, baggage claim areas, a children’s playground, restaurants, prayer rooms, and souvenir shops. A separate cargo terminal occupies an area of 516 square meters. The runway measures 2,120 by 45 meters (6,955 ft × 148 ft), allowing it to accommodate narrow-body aircraft such as the Airbus A320 and Boeing 737. The airport also features two taxiways, each measuring 87 by 23 meters, and an apron measuring 300 by 77.5 meters, capable of handling multiple narrow-body aircraft simultaneously.

To accommodate the growing number of passengers and tourists traveling to the Tanjung Puting National Park, plans are underway for the development of the airport. Future plans include extending the runway to 2,500 meters to accommodate larger aircraft and enhance the airport’s cargo capacity, with the potential for a further extension to 4,000 meters in the future to accommodate wide-body aircraft. However, the runway expansion is subject to funding from the central government and approval from the Indonesian Air Force, which owns the land. Furthermore, a new passenger terminal is being planned, with funding allocated by the central government. Construction of the terminal was originally anticipated to begin in 2025, but the project had yet to commence as of 2026.

== Airlines and destinations ==
Airlines	Destinations
Batik Air	Jakarta–Soekarno-Hatta, Semarang, Surabaya
NAM Air	Jakarta–Soekarno-Hatta, Semarang, Surabaya
Wings Air	Ketapang

== Statistic ==
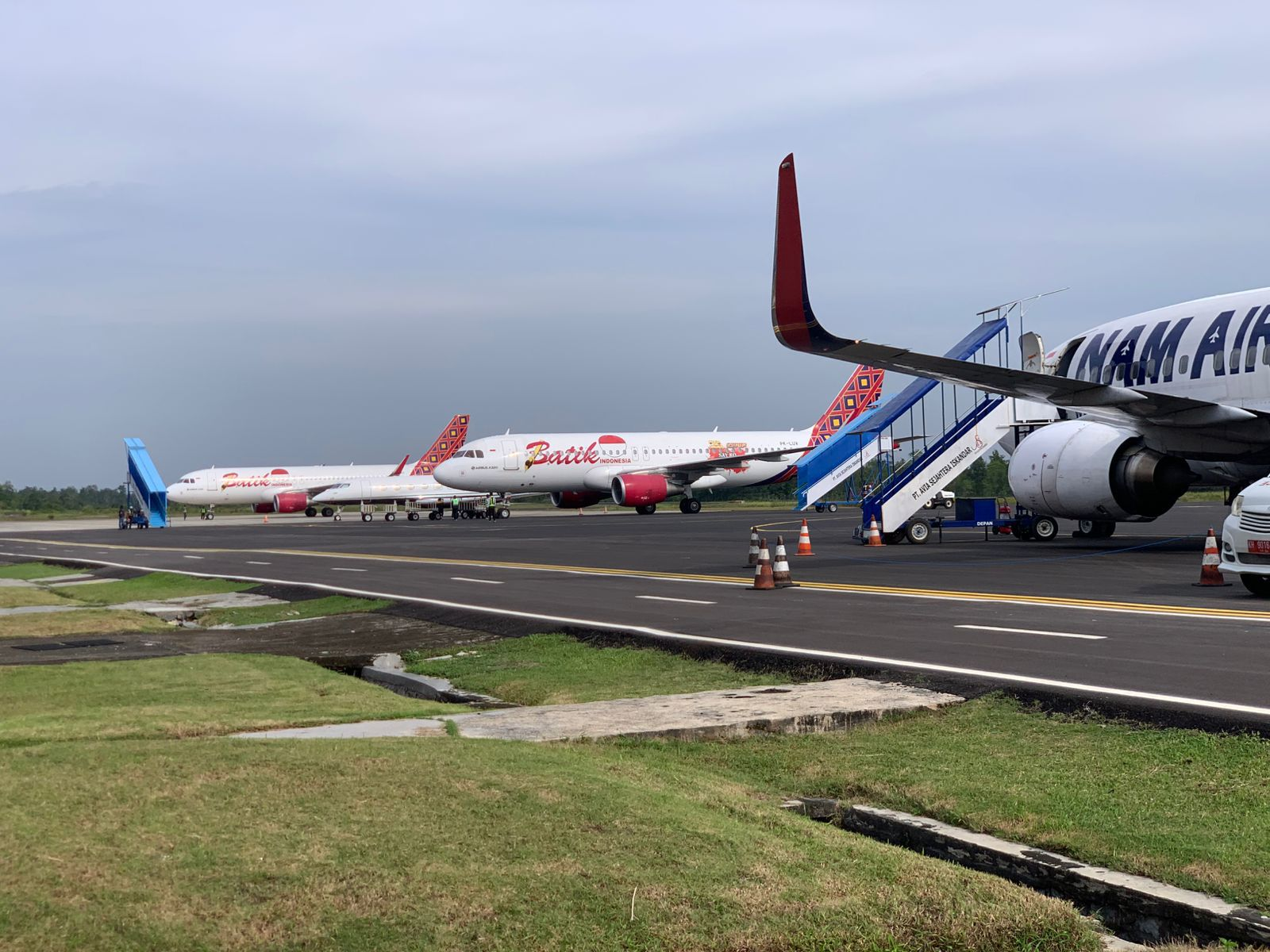
View of the apron at Iskandar Airport during rush hours, showing two Batik Air Airbus A320s and a NAM Air Boeing 737-500

Annual passenger numbers and aircraft statistics
Year	Passengers handled	Passenger % change	Cargo (tonnes)	Cargo % change	Aircraft movements	Aircraft % change
2006	61,229	Steady	226	Steady	2,766	Steady
2007	68,164	▲11.3	254	▲12.4	2,477	▼10.4
2008	112,382	▲64.9	329	▲29.5	2,940	▲18.7
2009	127,852	▲13.8	372	▲13.1	3,431	▲16.7
2010	146,413	▲14.5	378	▲1.6	3,879	▲13.1
2011	273,406	▲86.7	731	▲93.4	5,571	▲43.6
2012	360,644	▲31.9	772	▲5.6	6,722	▲20.7
2013	397,694	▲10.3	973	▲26.0	6,728	▲0.1
2014	418,848	▲5.3	770	▼20.9	5,194	▼22.8
2015	468,540	▲11.9	1,228	▲59.5	6,119	▲17.8
2016	469,337	▲0.2	1,265	▲3.0	6,420	▲4.9
2017	629,898	▲34.2	941	▼25.6	7,868	▲22.6
2018	664,546	▲5.5	1,376	▲46.2	7,487	▼4.8
2019	576,435	▼13.3	1,294	▼6.0	7,708	▲3.0
2020	232,178	▼59.7	842	▼34.9	3,389	▼56.0
2021	186,586	▼19.6	606	▼28.0	3,361	▼0.8
2022	345,970	▲85.4	783	▲29.2	4,687	▲39.5
2023	359,792	▲4.0	688	▼12.1	4,307	▼8.1
2024	472,637	▲31.4	629	▼8.6	4,351	▲1.0
^{Source: DGCA, BPS}
