= Pangsuma Airport =

Pangsuma Airport Bandar Udara Pangsuma
- IATA: PSU; ICAO: WIOP

Summary
- Airport type: Public
- Operator: Government
- Location: Putussibau, Kapuas Hulu Regency, West Kalimantan, Indonesia
- Time zone: WIB (UTC+07:00)
- Elevation AMSL: 297 ft / 91 m
- Coordinates: 00°50′08″N 112°56′13″E

Map
- Location of the airport in Kalimantan

Runways
Direction	Length		Surface
Direction	m	ft	Surface
10/28	1,800	5,905	Asphalt
- Source: DAFIF

Pangsuma Airport (IATA: PSU, ICAO: WIOP) is an airport in Putussibau, West Kalimantan, Indonesia. The distance between the Airport and Putussibau is 3.7 km via Jl. Lintas Kalimantan Poros Utara. Putussibau is the capital of Kapuas Hulu within approximately 400 km from Pontianak. The town is the gateway to the two major eco-tourism destinations in the heart of Borneo, Danau Sentarum National Park and Betung Kerihun National Park.

The airport is managed and controlled by UPT Ditjen Hubud, an agency under Ministry of Transportation, Indonesia. Throughout 2016, it served 73,662 passengers.

== Airlines and destinations ==
The following airlines offer scheduled passenger service:

Airlines	Destinations
Wings Air	Pontianak

== Statistic ==
Frequency of flights at Pangsuma Airport
Rank	Destinations	Frequency (weekly)	Airline(s)
1	Pontianak, West Kalimantan	14	NAM Air, Wings Air
