= Pangkalan Bun =

- Town
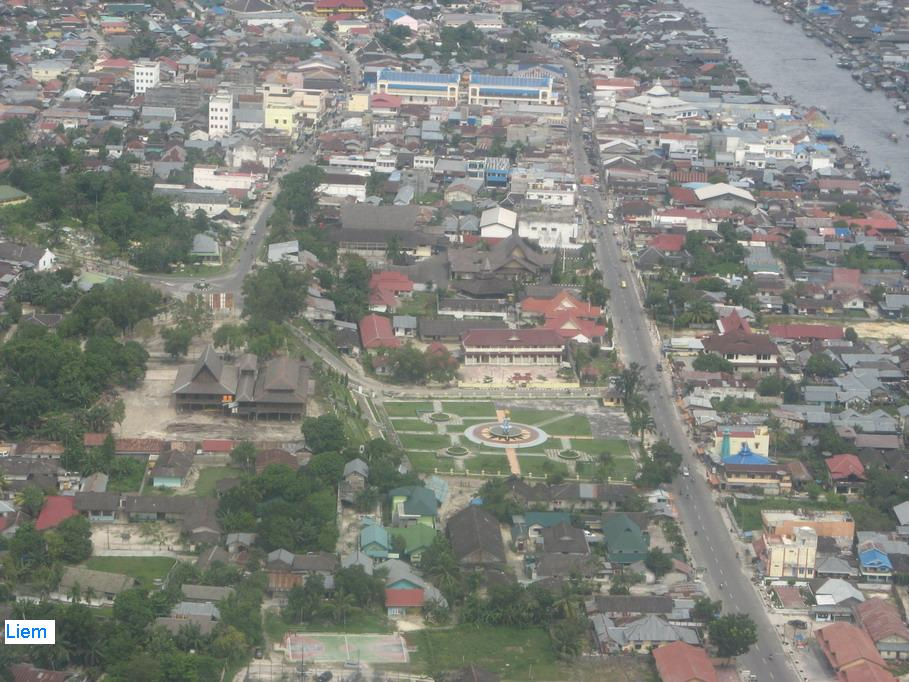
- An aerial view of Pangkalan Bun, looking towards the south with the Arut River in the top right-hand corner of the view

- Location of Pangkalan Bun on Kalimantan.
- Coordinates: 2°41′S 111°37′E
- Province: Central Kalimantan
- Regency: West Kotawaringin
- District: South Arut

Area
  - Total: 814.00 km^{2} (314.29 sq mi)

Population (mid 2024)
  - Total: 108,814
  - Density: 133.68/km^{2} (346.22/sq mi)
- Time zone: UTC+7 (WIB)
- Kode Pos: 74110

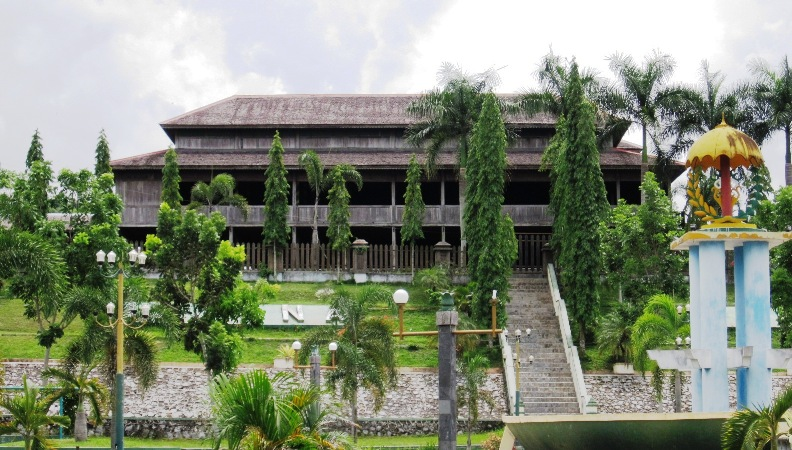
The Istana Kuning or "Yellow Palace" of the former princes of Kotawaringin

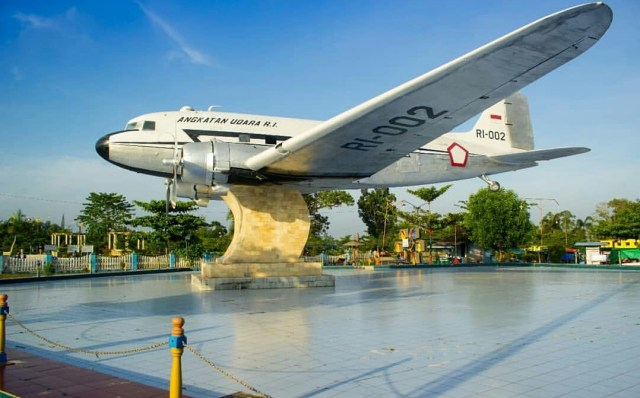
The C-47 Skytrain or Dakota RI-002 monument that was originally used for paratroopers on Operasi Kalimantan or Operation Kalimantan in 1947.

Pangkalan Bun is the capital of West Kotawaringin Regency in Central Kalimantan Province, on Borneo, Indonesia. It is an agglomeration of seven urban villages (kelurahan) plus one nominally rural village (desa), all of which are part of South Arut District (kecamatan Arut Selatan), with a combined population of 108,814 in mid 2024. It is also the administrative headquarters of Sout5 Arut District (Arut Selatan).

The town is mostly situated on the east bank of the Arut River, although the kelurahan of Menawai Seberang and Raja Seberang lie on the west bank of the river ("Seberang" in Indonesian means "across" or "on the other side of" [the river]). The seven kelurahan (urban villages) of the district have a land area of 652 km^{2} and a population of 94,114 according to the official estimates for mid 2024; in addition to these, Pasir Panjang (which is technically classed as a rural village (desa), but is an urbanised part of the agglomeration) has a further 14,700 inhabitants in 2024. All these are listed below, together with the rural villages in the district, together with their postcodes.

| Kode Wilayah | Name of kelurahan or desa | Area in km^{2} | Pop'n Estimate mid 2024 | Post codes |
|---|---|---|---|---|
| 62.01.02.1002 | Mendawai Seberang | 26.00 | 2,337 | 74117 |
| 62.01.02.1003 | Mendawai | 469.00 | 12,853 | 74115 |
| 62.01.02.2004 | Pasir Panjang | 162.00 | 14,700 | 74117 |
| 62.01.02.1005 | Madurejo | 26.00 | 24,681 | 74112 |
| 62.01.02.1006 | Sidorejo | 6.00 | 19,086 | 74111 |
| 62.01.02.1007 | Raja | 1.50 | 6,727 | 74114 |
| 62.01.02.1008 | Raja Seberang | 115.00 | 2,602 | 74116 |
| 62.01.02.1009 | Baru | 8.50 | 25,828 | 74113 |
| 62.01.02 | Pangkalan Bun Totals | 814.00 | 108,814 | |
| 62.01.02.2001 | Tanjung Putri | 19.00 | 850 | 74117 |
| 62.01.02.2010 | Rangda | 51.00 | 1,144 | 74117 |
| 62.01.02.2011 | Kenambui | 150.00 | 671 | 74117 |
| 62.01.02.2012 | Runtu | 504.00 | 1,927 | 74117 |
| 62.01.02.2013 | Umpang | 609.00 | 1,114 | 74117 |
| 62.01.02.2014 | Kumpai Batu Bawah | 18.25 | 2,163 | 74117 |
| 62.01.02.2015 | Kumpai Batu Atas | 30.00 | 3,932 | 74117 |
| 62.01.02.2016 | Natai Raya | 6.20 | 2,035 | 74117 |
| 62.01.02.2017 | Medang Sari | 9.00 | 1,504 | 74117 |
| 62.01.02.2018 | Natai Baru | 7.30 | 1,400 | 74117 |
| 62.01.02.2019 | Tanjung Terantang | 12.25 | 1,209 | 74117 |
| 62.01.02.2020 | Sulung | 170.00 | 805 | 74117 |
| 62.01.02 | Rural villages of Arut Selatan District | 1,586.00 | 18,755 | |

Pangkalan Bun is served by Iskandar Airport. Several airlines (which is Nam Air, Citilink, and Batik Air) fly to this airport. Shipping services provide connections to Jakarta, Surabaya, and Semarang.

Birutė Galdikas established her base, Camp Leakey, for the study and conservation of orangutans about 48 kilometres (30 mi) from Pangkalan Bun up the Sekonyer River. The site was expanded from the original hut in 1971. Its facilities, supported by the Orangutan Foundation International, are a part of the Tanjung Puting National Park.

== Crash of AirAsia QZ 8501 ==
Iskandar Airport was one of the operation centres being used to support search operations following the crash of AirAsia QZ 8501 on 28 December 2014 in nearby Karimata Strait. Shortly after the crash, the Indonesian National Search and Rescue Agency (BASARNAS, or Badan SAR Nasional) established a post in Iskandar airport to coordinate the search. The head of the agency, Air Marshal Bambang Sulistyo, took close personal command of operations.

Following confirmation of the crash, Indonesian agencies prepared over 160 coffins in Pangkalan Bun to be ready, following Indonesian practice, to take care of those who died as quickly as possible. After a reception in Pangkalan Bun, the plan was to return the bodies of the people who died to their families, mostly in Surabaya in East Java where Flight QZ 8501 originated from.

== Geography ==
Pangkalan Bun is 24 metres (79 ft) above sea-level.

=== Climate ===
Pangkalan Bun has a tropical rainforest climate (Af) with heavy rainfall year-round.

Climate data for Pangkalan Bun (Iskandar Airport) (1991–2020 normals)
| Month | Jan | Feb | Mar | Apr | May | Jun | Jul | Aug | Sep | Oct | Nov | Dec | Year |
|---|---|---|---|---|---|---|---|---|---|---|---|---|---|
| Record high °C (°F) | 37.2 (99.0) | 37.8 (100.0) | 36.0 (96.8) | 35.8 (96.4) | 36.4 (97.5) | 35.6 (96.1) | 36.5 (97.7) | 35.6 (96.1) | 35.8 (96.4) | 36.4 (97.5) | 36.8 (98.2) | 35.6 (96.1) | 37.8 (100.0) |
| Mean daily maximum °C (°F) | 31.8 (89.2) | 32.1 (89.8) | 32.1 (89.8) | 32.1 (89.8) | 32.3 (90.1) | 31.8 (89.2) | 31.5 (88.7) | 31.8 (89.2) | 32.2 (90.0) | 32.3 (90.1) | 32.1 (89.8) | 31.8 (89.2) | 32 (90) |
| Daily mean °C (°F) | 26.1 (79.0) | 26.2 (79.2) | 26.2 (79.2) | 26.3 (79.3) | 26.7 (80.1) | 26.3 (79.3) | 25.9 (78.6) | 26.0 (78.8) | 26.2 (79.2) | 26.3 (79.3) | 26.2 (79.2) | 26.0 (78.8) | 26.2 (79.2) |
| Mean daily minimum °C (°F) | 23.1 (73.6) | 23.1 (73.6) | 23.2 (73.8) | 23.4 (74.1) | 23.5 (74.3) | 23.1 (73.6) | 22.4 (72.3) | 22.3 (72.1) | 22.7 (72.9) | 23.0 (73.4) | 23.1 (73.6) | 23.1 (73.6) | 23.0 (73.4) |
| Record low °C (°F) | 19.9 (67.8) | 19.4 (66.9) | 20.5 (68.9) | 20.5 (68.9) | 20.8 (69.4) | 18.1 (64.6) | 17.4 (63.3) | 17.0 (62.6) | 17.7 (63.9) | 19.4 (66.9) | 19.4 (66.9) | 20.5 (68.9) | 17.0 (62.6) |
| Average precipitation mm (inches) | 247.8 (9.76) | 239.7 (9.44) | 293.3 (11.55) | 313.4 (12.34) | 211.3 (8.32) | 178.0 (7.01) | 136.0 (5.35) | 105.3 (4.15) | 128.1 (5.04) | 214.5 (8.44) | 289.9 (11.41) | 302.2 (11.90) | 2,659.5 (104.70) |
| Average precipitation days (≥ 1.0 mm) | 18.8 | 16.4 | 19.5 | 18.9 | 14.0 | 12.5 | 10.9 | 8.9 | 9.3 | 14.7 | 19.1 | 21.4 | 184.4 |
| Mean monthly sunshine hours | 128.6 | 125.2 | 135.2 | 137.6 | 163.1 | 162.5 | 171.9 | 182.2 | 151.9 | 142.3 | 130.9 | 122.4 | 1,753.8 |
Source: World Meteorological Organization
