= Wings Air =

Low-cost commuter airline of Indonesia

- A Wings Air ATR 72-600 in current livery.
IATA	ICAO	Call sign
IW	WON	WINGS ABADI
- Founded: 10 July 2003; 23 years ago
- Operating bases: Denpasar; Kupang; Makassar; Manado; Medan
- Fleet size: 77
- Destinations: 77
- Parent company: Lion Air Group
- Headquarters: Jakarta, Indonesia
- Key people: Rusdi Kirana (CEO)
- Website: www.lionair.co.id

PT Wings Abadi Airlines, operating as Wings Air, is a scheduled commuter passenger low-cost airline based in Jakarta, Indonesia. The airline operates out of Sultan Hasanuddin International Airport in Makassar as well as several other airports around Indonesia. The company was established as a short-haul regional flight service, wholly owned subsidiary of Lion Air and started operations on July 10, 2003 and the airline is currently linking tier-two and tier-three cities in Indonesia as to bypass the airline's congested base in Jakarta.

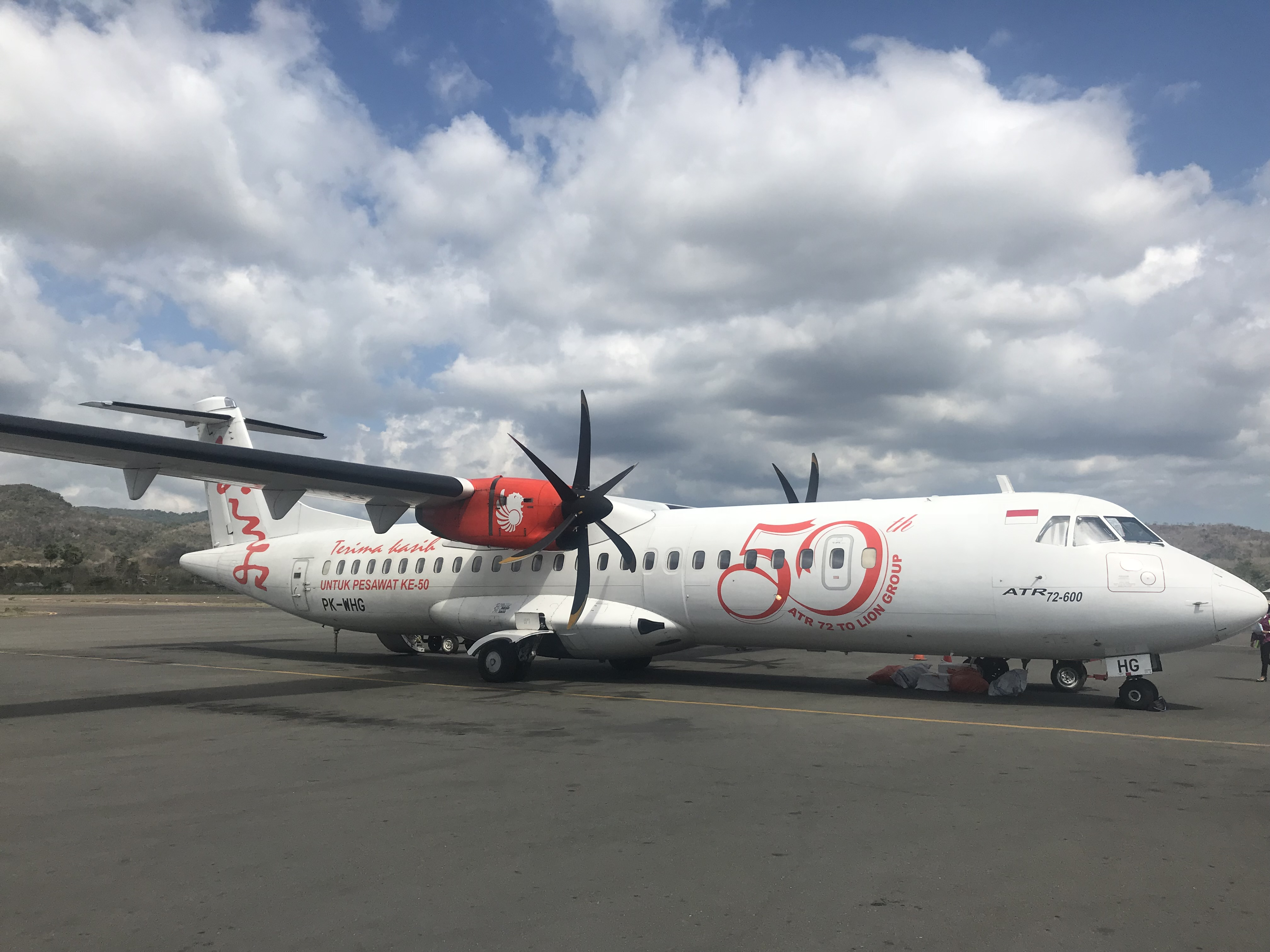
Wings Air ATR 72-600 with special livery as the 50th delivered aircraft

== Destinations ==
The airline currently serves domestic flights to other cities from their operating bases including Denpasar, Kupang, Makassar, Manado and Medan, In 2025. It is announced that the airline will serve international flight from Kupang to Dili, East Timor and was scheduled to operate in March 2026. which marks the resumption of international flights from the airport.

== Fleet ==
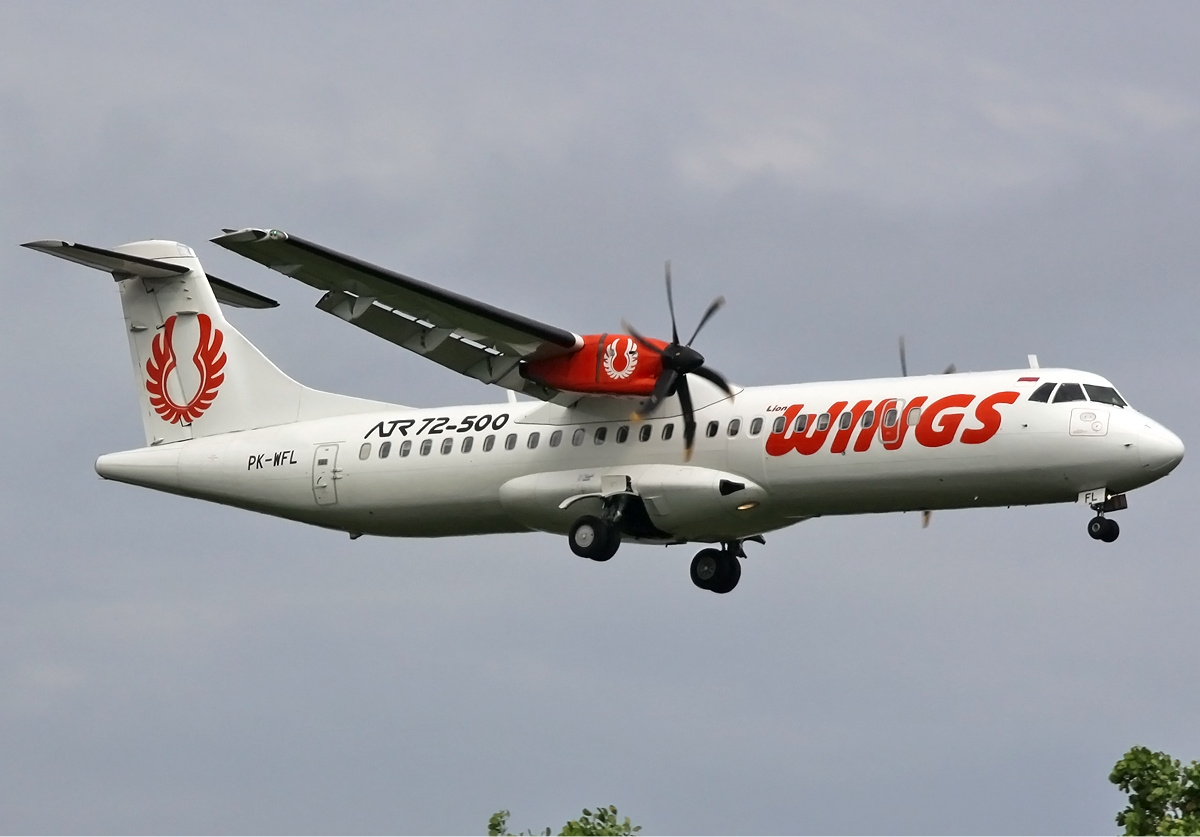
A Wings Air ATR 72-500 in former livery

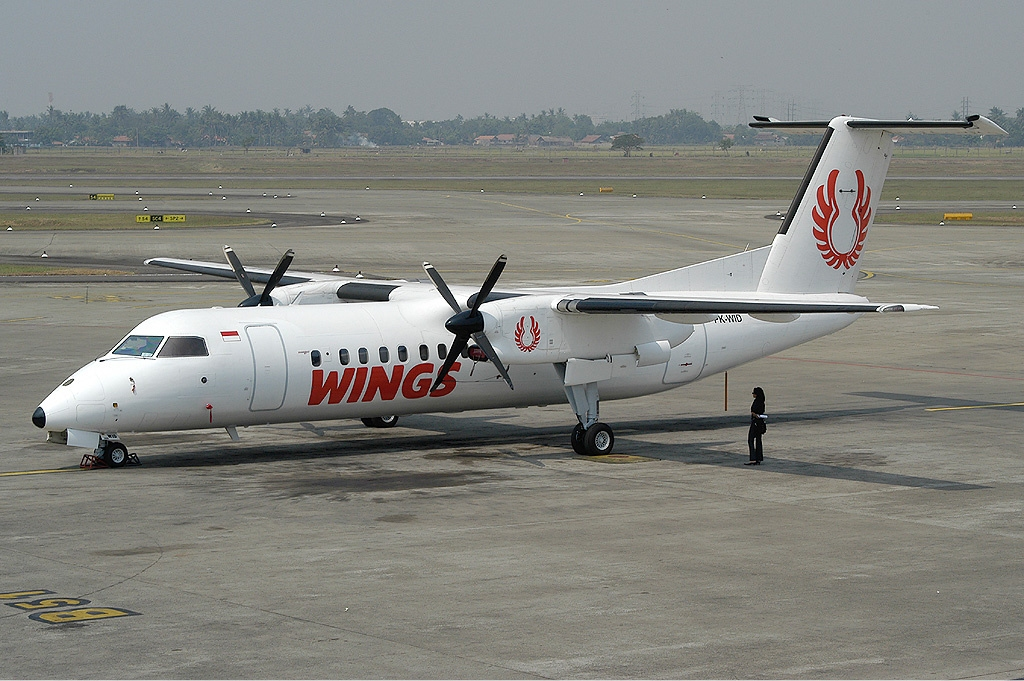
A former Wings Air Bombardier Dash 8-300

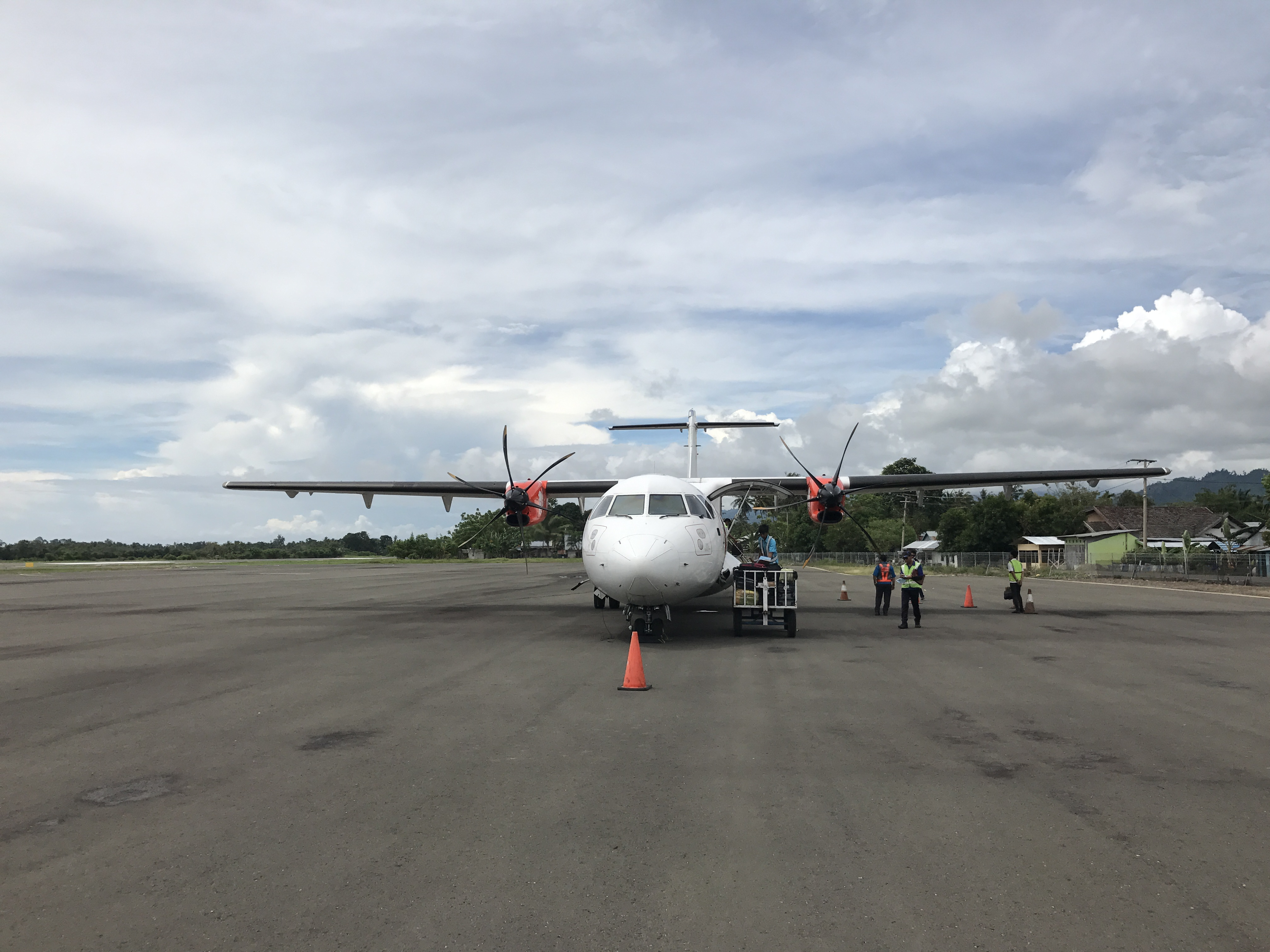
ATR 72-500 from Wings Air at Tampa Padang Airport

As of July 2026, Wings Air operates the following aircraft:

Wings Air fleet
Aircraft	In service	Orders	Passengers	Notes
ATR 72-500	18	—	72	
ATR 72-600	59	—	72	Transferred from Batik Air Malaysia.
Total	77	—		

=== Fleet development ===
On 15 November 2009, Wings Air announced that it had signed a deal with ATR worth US$600 million. The deal involved an order for 15 ATR 72-500 aircraft with a further 15 options for ATR's new ATR 72-600 aircraft. The new aircraft replaced the airline's aging Bombardier Dash 8 aircraft and will allow further expansion into smaller airports within Indonesia. The first three ATR 72-500s were delivered in January 2010 and were inaugurated at a ceremony in the tourist and diving destination of Manado.

On 25 February 2011 Lion Air signed an order for 15 new ATR 72s for the Wings Air fleet. The 2009 contract had included options for 15 additional ATR 72-600 aircraft. The deal announced in February 2011 represented the conversion of all 15 options.

On 27 November 2014 Lion Air signed an order for 40 new ATR 72-600 for the Wings Air fleet. It makes Lion Group ATR's largest customer.

=== Former fleet ===
As of August 2025, Wings operated 18 ATR 72-500 and 59 ATR 72-600

The airline also previously operated:

- De Havilland Canada Dash 8-300
- McDonnell Douglas MD-80

== Accidents and incidents ==
- 25 December 2016: Wings Air Flight 1896, an ATR 72-600 (registered PK-WGW) carrying 52 passengers and crew, veered off the runway and crashed on its side while landing in Semarang in bad weather. No one was killed in the crash, but six people were treated for shock. The aircraft was substantially damaged. Passengers stated that the undercarriage broke during landing.
- 5 January 2017: Wings Air Flight 1372, an ATR-72-500 (registration PK-WFP), overran the taxiway while taxiing in Rahadi Osman Airport, Ketapang. The aircraft was carrying 30 passengers and five crew. There were no fatalities.
- 17 February 2024: Wings Air Flight 1646 was shot in Papua Highlands by an unknown person. No one was hurt.
