= Ndana =

Ndana can refer to two islands in Indonesia:

- Pamana Island, off Rote Island, southernmost island of Indonesia
- Dana Island (Sabu Raijua), off Sawu Island
