= Ndao =

Ndao may refer to:

- Ndao, an island in Indonesia
- Ndao language, the language used in Indonesia
- Ndao people, an ethnic group in Indonesia
- Ndaw, typical Gambian and Senegalese patronym of the Serer people
