= Savu (disambiguation) =

Savu is an island in East Nusa Tenggara province, Indonesia.

Savu may also refer to:

- Savu people, ethnic group living on Savu and the neighbouring island of Raijua
- Savu language, language spoken by the Savu people, one of the Bima-Sumba languages
- Savu Sea, Indonesian sea named for Savu island
- Savu, a tributary of the river Olteț in Romania
- Savu River (Fiji)

People with the given name or family name Savu include:

- Ilie Savu, Romanian football player
- Mihai Savu, Romanian Olympic fencer
- Alin Mircea Savu, Romanian football player
- Savu Viliame, Fijian cricketer
