= Săvești =

Săvești may refer to several villages in Romania:

- Săvești, a village in Braniștea Commune, Dâmbovița County
- Săvești, a village in Răucești Commune, Neamț County

== See also ==
- Sava (disambiguation)
- Savu (disambiguation)
