= Savu languages =

Languages spoken in Nusa Tenggara, Indonesia

Savu
- Geographic distribution: Lesser Sunda Islands, Indonesia
- Linguistic classification: Unclear, perhaps Austronesian: Malayo-Polynesian; Sumba–Flores ?; Sumba–Hawu; Savu
- Subdivisions: Hawu; Dhao

Language codes
- Glottolog: hawu1234
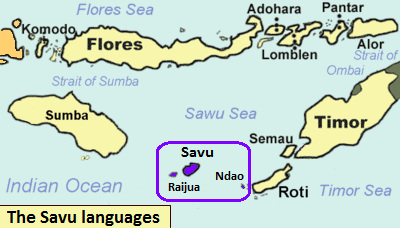

The Savu languages, Hawu and Dhao, are spoken on Savu and Ndao Islands in East Nusa Tenggara, Indonesia.

== Classification ==
Cappell (1975) noted a large amount of non-Austronesian vocabulary and grammatical features in the Central Malayo-Polynesian languages of East Nusa Tenggara and Maluku, notably in Hawu. While he generally spoke of a non-Austronesian substratum, Hawu is so divergent from Austronesian norms that he classified it (and Dhao) as a non-Austronesian language. He says,

Hawu also has a large AN [Austronesian] vocabulary, including the pronouns, and a couple of grammatical features, principally the stative prefix ma- and the causative pa- ... However, it contains no other AN grammatical features at all, and while being quite NAN [non-Austronesian], its grammar does not fall into line with the AT [Alor-Timor] languages, but is of an independent type. The right evaluation is therefore that Hawu is NAN, with a very heavy overlay of Indonesian AN vocabulary. (p. 683)

However, it is now generally accepted that Savu is no more divergent than the other Central Malayo-Polynesian languages, all of which display a non-Austronesian component that defines Melanesian languages.

== Phonology ==
The Savu languages have the same vowels and stress rules. They share implosive (or perhaps pre-glottalized) consonants with the Bima–Sumba languages and with languages of Flores and Sulawesi further north, such Wolio, and languages of Flores such as Ngad'a have rather similar lengthening of consonants after schwa. Dhao has the larger inventory, but even where the languages have the same consonants, there is often not a one-to-one correspondence. Apart from Hawu /v/, Dhao is more conservative. Hawu *s, *c shifted to /h/ in historical times. Non-obvious correlations are:

Dhao	Hawu	example	gloss
tʃ	h	tʃaʔe ~ haʔe	climb
s	h	risi ~ rihi	more
h	h	həba ~ həɓa	mouth
h	v	hahi ~ vavi	pig
ɖʐ	d	maɖʐe ~ made	dead
d	ɗ	məda ~ məɗa	niɡht
ɗ	ɗ	loɗo	sun, day
bβ	b	bβəni ~ bəni	woman
b	ɓ	həba ~ həɓa	mouth
ɓ	ɓ	saɓa ~ haɓa (?)	effort
#dʒ	#ʄ, #j	dʒaʔa ~ ʄaa/jaa	I, me
.dʒ	.dʒ	padʒuu ~ pedʒuu (?)	command
ʄ	ʄ	aʄu	tree

For initial /dʒ/ in Dhao, there is dialectical variation between /ʄ/ and /j/ in Hawu. Most other consonants have a one-to-one correspondence, but a few (such as /ɓ/, /ɡ/, and non-initial /dʒ/) are not well-enough attested to be certain.

== Pronouns ==
Independent personal pronouns are similar.

	Dhao	Hawu
I	dʒaʔa	ʄaa (jaa, dʒoo)
thou	əu	əu (au, ou)
s/he	nəŋu	noo
we (incl)	əɖʐi	dii
we (excl)	dʒiʔi	ʄii
y'all	miu	muu
they	rəŋu	raa (naa)

Parenthetical forms in Hawu are dialectical.
