= Maladera crinifrons =

Scientific classification
- Kingdom: Animalia
- Phylum: Arthropoda
- Class: Insecta
- Order: Coleoptera
- Suborder: Polyphaga
- Infraorder: Scarabaeiformia
- Family: Scarabaeidae
- Genus: Maladera
- Species: M. crinifrons

Binomial name
- Maladera crinifrons (Brenske, 1899)

Synonyms
- Autoserica crinifrons Brenske, 1899

Species of beetle

Maladera crinifrons is a species of beetle of the family Scarabaeidae. It is found in Indonesia (Savu Island).

== Description ==
Adults reach a length of about 8 mm. They have an egg-shaped, dull, strongly opalescent, reddish-brown body, with shiny legs. The clypeus is broad and densely coarsely wrinkled. The frons is widely punctate, with a dense row of rather long setae on the border between it and the vertex. The pronotum is scarcely projecting anteriorly in the middle, almost straight at the sides with angular hind angles. The elytra are broadly and coarsely punctate in the striae, the intervals appearing as distinct, less punctate ribs.
