= Dana Island (disambiguation) =

Dana Island refers to several islands in Indonesia and one island in Turkey

- Dana Island, an island in Mersin Province of Turkey
- Dana Island (Sabu Raijua), an island in Sabu Raijua Regency of Indonesia
- Dana Island (Rote Ndao), in East Nusa Tenggara province of Indonesia
