= Hawu language =

Austronesian language of the Savu people in Indonesia

Hawu
- Sabu
- Pronunciation: [ˈhavu]
- Native to: Indonesia
- Region: Lesser Sunda Islands
- Native speakers: (100,000 cited 1997)
- Language family: Austronesian: Malayo-Polynesian; Sumba–Flores; Sumba–Hawu; Savu; Hawu
- Dialects: Seba (Həɓa); Timu (Dimu); Liae; Mesara (Mehara); Raijua (Raidjua)

Language codes
- ISO 639-3: hvn
- Glottolog: sabu1255
- ELP: Hawu
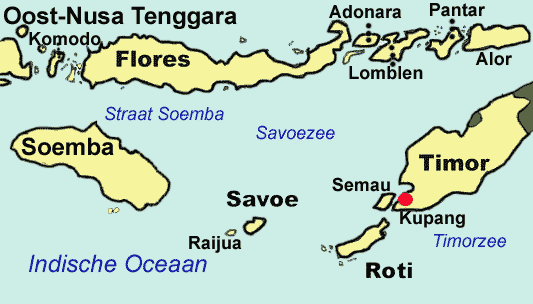
- location of the islands of Savu (Savoe) and Raijua in Indonesia

The Hawu language (Hawu: Lii Hawu) is the language of the Savu people of Savu Island in Indonesia and of Raijua Island off the western tip of Savu. Hawu has been referred to by a variety of names such as Havu, Savu, Sabu, Sawu, and is known to outsiders as Savu or Sabu (thus Havunese, Savunese, Sawunese). Hawu belongs to the Malayo-Polynesian branch of the Austronesian language family, and is most closely related to Dhao (spoken on Rote) and the languages of Sumba. Dhao was once considered a dialect of Hawu, but the two languages are not mutually intelligible.

== Dialects ==
The Seba (Mèb'a in Hawu) dialect is dominant, covering most of Savu Island and the main city of Seba. Timu (Dimu in Hawu) is spoken in the east, Mesara (Mehara in Hawu) in the west, and Liae on the southern tip of the island. Raijua is spoken on the island of the same name (Rai Jua 'Jua Island'), just off-shore to the west of Savu.

== Linguistic Structure ==
The following description is based on Walker (1982) and Grimes (2006).

=== Phonology ===
Hawu *s, attested during the Portuguese colonial era, has debuccalized to /h/, a change that has not happened in Dhao. The Hawu consonant inventory is smaller than that of Dhao:

		Labial	Apical	Palatal	Velar	Glottal
Nasal		m	n	ɲ	ŋ	
Stop	Voiceless	p	t		k	ʔ
Stop	Voiced	b	d	dʒ	ɡ	
Stop	Implosive	ɓ	ɗ	ʄ	ɠ	
Fricative		v~β	(s)			h
Liquid			l, r			
Approximant		(w)		(j)		

Consonants of the /n/ column are apical, those of the /ɲ/ column laminal. In common orthography, the implosives are written ⟨b', d', j', g'⟩. ⟨w⟩ is pronounced [v], [β], or [w]. A wye sound /j/ (written ⟨y⟩) is found at the beginning of some words in Seba dialect where Timu and Raijua dialects have /ʄ/.

Vowels are /i u e ə o a/, with /ə/ written ⟨è⟩ in common orthography. Phonetic long vowels and diphthongs are vowel sequences. The penultimate syllable/vowel is stressed. (Every vowel constitutes a syllable.) A stressed schwa lengthens the following consonant:

/ŋa/ [ŋa] 'with', /niŋaa/ [niˈŋaː] 'what?', /ŋaʔa/ [ˈŋaʔa] 'eat, food', /ŋali/ [ˈŋali] 'senile', /ŋəlu/ [ˈŋəlːu] 'wind'.

Syllables are consonant-vowel (CV) or vowel-only (V).

Implosives

Hawu shares implosive (or perhaps pre-glottalized) consonants with several other languages of the Lesser Sundas, including Bimanese, Kambera, Komodo, Li'o, Ngad'a, and Riung. While these languages are somewhat geographically close, they are not necessarily closely related. Many belong to different high-order Austronesian subgroups. As a result, implosives seem to be an areal feature—perhaps motivated by language contact and the reduction of homorganic nasal clusters in some languages—as opposed to an innovated feature.

Hawu, however, is the only language in the region with four implosives in its phonological inventory. All four implosives can occur both word-initially and intervocalically.

==== Historical vowel metathesis ====
The phonological history of Hawu is characterized by an unusual, but fully regular vowel metathesis, which affects the Proto-Malayo-Polynesian (PMP) vowel sequences *uCa/*uCə and *iCa/*iCə. The former changes into əCu, the latter into əCi, as illustrated in the following table.

PMP	Hawu	Gloss
*buta	ɓədu	blind
*Rumaq	əmu	house
*um-utaq	mədu	to vomit
*qulun-an	nəlu	headrest
*ŋuda	ŋəru	young
*bulan	wəru	moon, month
*pusəj	əhu	navel
*kudən	əru	cooking pot
*lima	ləmi	five
*pija	əri	how many
*ma-qitəm	mədi	black

=== Grammar ===
Hawu is an ergative–absolutive language with ergative preposition ri (Seba dialect), ro (Dimu), or la (Raijua). Clauses are usually verb-initial. However, the presence of the ergative preposition allows for a freer word order. Among monovalent verbs, S may occur before or after the verb. According to speakers, there is no difference in meaning between the two following constructions.

jaa bəʔi
1SG sleep
'I sleep.'

bəʔi jaa
sleep 1SG
'I sleep.'

In the absence of the ergative preposition, bivalent constructions have strict AVO word order.

Haʔe ta ngaʔa terae
Hae NPST eat sorghum
'Hae eats sorghum.'

When the ergative preposition is present, word order becomes quite free. In addition, with the presence of the ergative preposition, many transitive verbs have a special form to indicate singular number of the object by replacing the final vowel of the verb with "-e" when the verb ends in /i/, /o/, or /a/ (e.g. ɓudʒu 'touch them', ɓudʒe 'touch it') or "-o" when the verb ends in /u/ (bəlu, bəlo 'to forget'). Verbs that end in /e/ have no alternation. The following examples (from the Seba dialect) present a few of the word order options available, and also show the alternation of the verb nga'a 'to eat' to nga'e when ri is present.

Terae ngaʔe ri Haʔe
sorghum eat ERG Hae
'Hae eats sorghum.'

Ngaʔe ri Haʔe terae nane
eat ERG Hae sorghum DEM
'Hae eats sorghum.'

Within noun phrases, modifiers usually follow the noun, though there are some possibly lexicalized exceptions, such as ae dəu 'many people' (compare Dhao ɖʐəu ae 'people many').

Apart from this, and unlike in Dhao, all pronominal reference uses independent pronouns. These are:

I	Seba: jaa Dimu: ʄaa Raijua: ʄaa, dʒoo	we (incl)	dii
I	Seba: jaa Dimu: ʄaa Raijua: ʄaa, dʒoo	we (excl)	ʄii
you (sg.)	əu, au, ou	you (pl.)	muu
s/he	noo	they	roo Raijua: naa

The demonstratives are complex and poorly understood. They may be contrasted by number (see Walker 1982), but it is not confirmed by Grimes.

just this	ɗii
this	nee
the	əne, ne
that	nəi
yon	nii

These can be made locative (here, now, there, then, yonder) by preceding the n forms with na; the neutral form na əne optionally contracting to nəne. 'Like this/that' is marked with mi or mi na, with the n becoming h and the neutral əne form appearing irregularly as mi (na) həre.

Sample clauses (Grimes 2006). (Compare the Dhao equivalents at Dhao language#Grammar.)

ta nəru ke Simo oro ŋidi dahi.
NPST? walk ? (name) along edge sea
'Simo was walking along the edge of the sea.'

ta nəru ke roo teruu la Həɓa.
NPST? walk (?) they cont. to Seba
'They kept walking to Seba.'

ta la əte ke ri roo ne kətu noo.
NPST? go {cut off} (?) ERG they the head he/his
'They went and cut off his head.'

tapulara pe-made noo ri roo.
but CAUS-die he ERG they
'But they killed him.'

ki made ama noo,
if/when die father he/his
'When his father dies,'

ɗai təra noo ne rui.
very much he the strong
'He was incredibly strong.'

== Language resources ==
The Alan T. Walker Collection contains a number of resources produced through Hawu language documentation, including audio recordings, handwritten field notes, and narrative texts. An accompanying Finding Aid and Inventory was created for the collection in order to more easily navigate its contents in the PARADISEC archive.

The "Results of Linguistic Fieldwork and Documentation Training Program in East Nusa Tenggara" collection, which is also archived with PARADISEC, contains audio recordings of Hawu conversations, narratives, elicitation, genealogies, and wordlists. Several are also accompanied by video files.
