= Marthen Dira Tome =

- Tome as regent

Regent of Sabu Raijua
- In office 17 February 2016 – 15 November 2016
- In office 24 January 2011 – 24 January 2016
- Preceded by: Oktovianus Radja Pono (act.)
- Succeeded by: Nikodemus Rihi Heke

Personal details
- Born: 21 July 1964 (age 62) Sabu, East Nusa Tenggara, Indonesia

Marthen Luther Dira Tome (born 21 July 1964) is an Indonesian businessman and former politician. He served as the regent of Sabu Raijua Regency in East Nusa Tenggara from January 2011 to November 2016, being elected for two terms in 2010 and 2015. His second term was cut short when he was imprisoned for a corruption case.

== Early life ==
Marthen Luther Dira Tome was born on 21 July 1964 in Sabu Island, in East Nusa Tenggara. He began his studies there, graduating from an elementary school at the regency seat of Seba in 1970 and a middle school in 1977. He continued his studies at the provincial capital of Kupang, graduating high school in 1984. He then studied animal husbandry at Kupang's Nusa Cendana University, receiving his bachelor's degree in 1989.

== Career ==
After graduating from Nusa Cendana, Tome worked for a time as assistant manager at a village cooperative, and then as a research staff. In 2000, he led a project to establish extracurricular education which lasted until 2006, after which he was appointed as section head for extracurricular education in the East Nusa Tenggara provincial government's education department. He held this post until 2010. In 2010, Tome ran in Sabu Raijua's first direct regency election, with the endorsement of Golkar and Nikodemus Rihi Heke as his running mate. The pair secured 12,715 votes (35.83 percent), defeating six other candidate pairs.

As regent, Tome developed a network of reservoirs in the regency in order to reduce the impact of droughts. In one incident, a group refused to allow the construction of a reservoir, resulting in their forceful removal by municipal police officers with 13 injuries caused by the incident. The municipal government under Tome also started a local drinking water company with a Rp 50 billion (USD 3.7 million) investment. Tome was reelected for a second term in the 2015 regency election, with Rihi Heke remaining his deputy after the pair secured 23,912 votes (59.26 percent).

In November 2014, the Corruption Eradication Commission (KPK) made Tome a suspect of a corruption case from 2007, related to funds for extracurricular activities in the provincial government while he was a bureaucrat there. However, Tome filed for a pretrial which resulted in a judge ordering KPK to drop the case in May 2016 citing incomplete evidence. In November 2016, KPK again declared him a suspect for the same case, and in July 2017 the Surabaya Anti-Corruption Court sentenced him to three years in prison along with a fine of Rp 1.5 billion. An appeal to the Surabaya High Court resulted in the removal of the fine, but KPK's second appeal to the Supreme Court of Indonesia reverted the fine along with raising Tome's prison sentence to seven years on 14 May 2018. He was held at Porong prison in Sidoarjo, East Java, and was released from there on 26 September 2022.

=== Later career ===
Tome returned to Sabu following his release. He founded a sea salt production company operating in Sabu, which by 2024 he claimed to operate 32 hectares of salt ponds in Sabu.
