= Pharyngeal consonant =

Consonant articulated through the pharynx

Pharyngeal place of articulation

A pharyngeal consonant is a consonant that is articulated primarily in the pharynx. Some phoneticians distinguish upper-pharyngeal consonants (as they are in the extIPA) – also called "high" pharyngeals or radico-pharyngeals – pronounced by retracting the tongue root (the radix) in the mid to upper pharynx to make contact with the pharyngeal wall, and epiglottal consonants – also called "low" pharyngeals – which are pronounced either with the epiglottis making contact with the pharyngeal wall (epiglotto-pharyngeals), or with the aryepiglottic folds against the epiglottis at the entrance of the larynx (aryepiglottals). Other phoneticians combine (upper-)pharyngeals and epiglottals – i.e. "high" and "low" pharyngeals – under a single place of articulation.

Stops and trills can be reliably produced only at the epiglottis, and fricatives can be reliably produced only in the upper pharynx. When they are treated as distinct places of articulation, the term radical consonant may be used as a cover term, or the term guttural consonants may be used instead.

Pharyngeal consonants can trigger effects on neighboring vowels. Instead of uvulars, which nearly always trigger retraction, pharyngeals tend to trigger lowering. For example, in Moroccan Arabic, pharyngeals tend to lower neighboring vowels (corresponding to the formant 1). In Chechen, it causes lowering as well, in addition to centralization and lengthening of the segment /a/.

In addition, consonants and vowels may be secondarily pharyngealized. Also, strident vowels are defined by an accompanying epiglottal trill.

== Pharyngeal consonants in the IPA ==
Pharyngeal/epiglottal consonants in the International Phonetic Alphabet (IPA):

IPA	Description	Example			
IPA	Description	Language	Orthography	IPA	Meaning
ʡ	Pharyngeal (epiglottal) plosive (Note: A voiced epiglottal stop may not be possible. When an epiglottal stop becomes voiced intervocalically in Dahalo, for example, it becomes a tap. Phonetically, however, both voiceless and voiced affricates and off-glides are attested: [ʡħ, ʡʕ] (Esling 2010: 695).)	Aghul, Richa dialect	йагьІ	[jaʡ]	'centre'
ʜ	Voiceless pharyngeal (epiglottal) trill	Aghul, Richa dialect	хІач	[ʜatʃ]	'apple'
ʢ	Voiced pharyngeal (epiglottal) trill	Aghul, Richa dialect	Іекв	[ʢakʷ]	'light'
ħ	Voiceless pharyngeal fricative	Arabic	حَـر	[ħar]	'heat'
ʕ	Voiced pharyngeal fricative (Note: Although traditionally placed in the fricative row of the IPA chart, [ʕ] is usually an approximant. Frication is difficult to produce or to distinguish because the voicing in the glottis and the constriction in the pharynx are so close to each other (Esling 2010: 695, after Laufer 1996). The IPA symbol is ambiguous, but no language distinguishes fricative and approximant at this place of articulation. For clarity, the lowering diacritic may used to specify that the manner is approximant ⟨ʕ̞⟩ and a raising diacritic to specify that the manner is fricative ⟨ʕ̝⟩.)	Arabic	عـين	[ʕajn]	'eye'
ʡ̮	Pharyngeal (epiglottal) flap	Dahalo	[nd̠ódoʡ̮o]		'mud'
ʕ̞	Voiced pharyngeal approximant	Danish	ravn	[ʕ̞ɑʊ̯ˀn]	'raven'
ʡ͜ʜ	Voiceless epiglottal affricate	Haida (Hydaburg Dialect)	x̱ung	[ʡ͜ʜuŋ]	'father'
ʡ͜ʢ	Voiced epiglottal affricate	Somali	cad	[ʡ͜ʢaʔ͜t]	'white'
ꞯ	Voiceless upper-pharyngeal plosive	[extIPA for speech pathology]			
𝼂	Voiced upper-pharyngeal plosive	[extIPA for speech pathology]			

The Hydaburg dialect of Haida has a trilled epiglottal [ʜ] and a trilled epiglottal affricate [ʡʜ]~[ʡʢ]. (There is some voicing in all Haida affricates, but it is analyzed as an effect of the vowel.)

For transcribing disordered speech, the extIPA provides symbols for upper-pharyngeal stops, ⟨ꞯ⟩ and ⟨𝼂⟩.

== Place of articulation ==
The IPA first distinguished epiglottal consonants in 1989, with a contrast between pharyngeal and epiglottal fricatives, but advances in laryngoscopy since then have caused specialists to re-evaluate their position. Since a trill can be made only in the pharynx with the aryepiglottic folds (in the pharyngeal trill of the northern dialect of Haida, for example), and incomplete constriction at the epiglottis, as would be required to produce epiglottal fricatives, generally results in trilling, there is no contrast between (upper) pharyngeal and epiglottal based solely on place of articulation. Esling (2010) thus restores a unitary pharyngeal place of articulation, with the consonants being described by the IPA as epiglottal fricatives differing from pharyngeal fricatives in their manner of articulation rather than in their place:

The so-called "Epiglottal fricatives" are represented [here] as pharyngeal trills, [ʜ ʢ], since the place of articulation is identical to [ħ ʕ], but trilling of the aryepiglottic folds is more likely to occur in tighter settings of the laryngeal constrictor or with more forceful airflow. The same "epiglottal" symbols could represent pharyngeal fricatives that have a higher larynx position than [ħ ʕ], but a higher larynx position is also more likely to induce trilling than in a pharyngeal fricative with a lowered larynx position. Because [ʜ ʢ] and [ħ ʕ] occur at the same Pharyngeal/Epiglottal place of articulation (Esling, 1999), the logical phonetic distinction to make between them is in manner of articulation, trill versus fricative.

Edmondson et al. distinguish several subtypes of pharyngeal consonant. Pharyngeal or epiglottal stops and trills are usually produced by contracting the aryepiglottic folds of the larynx against the epiglottis. That articulation has been distinguished as aryepiglottal. In pharyngeal fricatives, the root of the tongue is retracted against the back wall of the pharynx. In a few languages, such as Achumawi, Amis of Taiwan and perhaps some of the Salishan languages, the two movements are combined, with the aryepiglottic folds and epiglottis brought together and retracted against the pharyngeal wall, an articulation that has been termed epiglotto-pharyngeal. The IPA does not have diacritics to distinguish this articulation from standard aryepiglottals; Edmondson et al. use the ad hoc, somewhat misleading, transcriptions ⟨ʕ͡ʡ⟩ and ⟨ʜ͡ħ⟩. There are, however, several diacritics for subtypes of pharyngeal sound among the Voice Quality Symbols.

Although upper-pharyngeal plosives are not found in the world's languages, apart from the rear closure of some click consonants, they occur in disordered speech. See voiceless upper-pharyngeal plosive and voiced upper-pharyngeal plosive.

== Distribution ==
Pharyngeals are known primarily from three areas of the world:

1. the Middle East, North Africa and the Horn of Africa, in the Semitic, Berber (mostly in borrowings from Arabic) and Cushitic branches of the Afroasiatic language family
2. the Caucasus, in the Northwest, and Northeast Caucasian language families
3. the endangered native languages of British Columbia, in the Northern Haida dialects, in the Interior Salish branch of the Salishan language family, and in the southern branch of the Wakashan language family.

There are scattered reports of pharyngeals elsewhere, as in:

- Indo-European languages:
  - According to the laryngeal theory, Proto-Indo-European might have had pharyngeal consonants.
  - Indo-Iranian:
    - Iranian:
      - Western:
        - Northwestern:
          - Kurdish: [ħ], [ʕ] (Note: Mostly occurs in words of Arabic origin, mostly in word-initial position)
          - Zaza–Gorani:
            - Zaza: [ħ], [ʕ]
            - Gorani: [ħ], [ʕ] (Note: Borrowed from Arabic)
        - Southwestern:
          - Kumzari: [ħ]
          - Persian:
            - Tat:
              - Judeo-Tat: [ħ], [ʕ]
      - Eastern:
        - Northeastern:
          - Yaghnobi: [ħ] (Note: Appear mostly in loanwords. Native words with those sounds are rare and mostly onomatopoeic.), [ʕ]
    - Nuristani:
      - Northern:
        - Kalasha-ala: [ħ], [ʕ]
        - Kamkata-vari:
          - Kamviri dialect: [ħ], [ʕ]
    - Indo-Aryan:
      - Northern
        - Western Pahari
          - Kullui: [ħ] (Note: Historically derives from /s/ and occurs word-finally, e.g. [ɡʱɑːħ] "grass", [biːħ] "twenty")
      - Eastern
        - Bengali-Assamese
          - some eastern Bengali dialects: [ʜ] (Note: Mainly realized as such in very eastern regions; often also debuccalized or phonetically realised as /x/. Corresponds to /kʰ/ in western and central dialects)
      - Western:
        - Domari: [ħ], [ʕ]
      - Northwestern:
        - Sindhi:
          - Luwati: [ħ], [ʕ]
  - Slavic:
    - East:
      - Ukrainian: [ʕ] (Note: According to some linguists, Ukrainian may have a pharyngeal [ʕ] (when devoiced, [ħ] or sometimes [x] in weak positions). According to others, it is glottal [ɦ].)
  - Germanic:
    - the approximant [ʕ̞] is a realization of /r/ in such Germanic languages as Danish and Swabian German.
  - Romance:
    - Italo-Western:
      - Western:
        - Iberian:
          - West:
            - Galician-Portuguese:
              - some dialects of Galician: [ħ] (Note: Gheada)
            - Castilian:
              - Judeo-Spanish:
                - Haketia: [ħ] (Note: Borrowed from Arabic and Hebrew), [ʕ]
- Austronesian languages:
  - Formosan:
    - East:
      - Amis: [ʡ] ~ [ʢ], [ʜ] (Note: It is unclear if [h] is a separate phoneme from [ʜ] or if it is just an allophone of it. The voiceless pharyngeal fricative [ħ] is a word-final allophone of /ʜ/)
    - Atayalic:
      - Atayal: [ħ]
    - Northern:
      - Pazeh: [ħ] (Note: Varies between glottal ([h]) and pharyngeal realizations and is sometimes difficult to distinguish from /x/)
  - Malayo-Polynesian:
    - Malayic:
      - Kedah Malay: [ʕ] (Note: Word-final realisation of /r/)
    - Central–Eastern:
      - Central:
        - Sumba–Flores:
          - Savu:
            - Dhao: [ʕ] (Note: Sometimes silent, but contrasts with a glottal stop onset in vowel-initial words within a phrase. Its phonemic status is not clear. It has an "extremely limited distribution", linking noun phrases (/ʔiki/ 'small', /ʔana ʕiki/ 'small child') and clauses (/ʕaa/ 'and', /ʕoo/ 'also'))
        - Timoric:
          - Mambai: [ħ] (Note: In free variation with [h])
- Niger–Congo languages:
  - Atlantic-Congo:
    - Volta-Congo:
      - Volta-Niger:
        - Gbe:
          - Ewe: [ʕ] (Note: Has also been described as uvular [ʁ] or glottal [ɦ])
    - Senufo:
      - Suppire–Mamara:
        - Minyanka: [ʕ] (Note: Typically heard when in between vowels, or as an allophone of /ɡ/ when in intervocalic position)
- Nilo-Saharan languages:
  - Bʼaga:
    - Daatsʼiin: [ʕ] (Note: Only occurs when following /l/ or /r/ and preceding /a/, and it can be analyzed as an allophone of the glottal stop /ʔ/)
  - Saharan:
    - Eastern:
      - Zaghawa: [ħ]
  - Songhay:
    - Northern:
      - Tadaksahak: [ħ], [ʕ]
      - Tagdal: [ħ], [ʕ]
      - Korandje: [ħ], [ʕ]
- Chukotko-Kamchatkan languages:
  - Chukotkan:
    - Koryak: [ʕ]
    - Alyutor: [ʕ]
    - Kerek: [ħ]
- the language isolate Kusunda of Nepal: [ʕ] (Note: In free variation with [ʁ])
- the Papuan language Teiwa: [ħ]
- the Guaicuruan language Pilagá: [ʕ]
- the Mayan language Achi: [ʕ]
- the Siouan language Stoney (Nakoda): [ħ] (Note: In the Morley dialect), [ʕ]
- the Achumawi language of California: [ʜ]

The fricatives and trills (the pharyngeal and epiglottal fricatives) are frequently conflated with pharyngeal fricatives in literature. That was the case for Dahalo and Northern Haida, for example, and it is likely to be true for many other languages. The distinction between these sounds was recognized by IPA only in 1989, and it was little investigated until the 1990s.

== See also ==
- Pharyngealization
- Strident vowel
- Ayin
- Heth
- Guttural

== Sources ==
- Ladefoged, Peter; Maddieson, Ian (1996). The Sounds of the World's Languages. Oxford: Blackwell. ISBN 0-631-19815-6.
- Maddieson, I., & Wright, R. (1995). The vowels and consonants of Amis: A preliminary phonetic report. In I. Maddieson (Ed.), UCLA working papers in phonetics: Fieldwork studies of targeted languages III (No. 91, pp. 45–66). Los Angeles: The UCLA Phonetics Laboratory Group. (in pdf)

Place →	Labial					Coronal										Dorsal					Laryngeal			
Manner ↓	Bilabial		Labiodental		Linguolabial		Dental		Alveolar		Postalveolar		Retroflex		(Alveolo-)palatal		Velar		Uvular		Pharyngeal/epiglottal		Glottal	
Nasal	m̥	m	ɱ̊	ɱ		n̼	n̪̊	n̪	n̥	n	n̠̊	n̠	ɳ̊	ɳ	ɲ̊	ɲ	ŋ̊	ŋ	ɴ̥	ɴ				
Plosive	p	b	p̪	b̪	t̼	d̼	t̪	d̪	t	d			ʈ	ɖ	c	ɟ	k	ɡ	q	ɢ	ʡ		ʔ	
Sibilant affricate							t̪s̪	d̪z̪	ts	dz	t̠ʃ	d̠ʒ	tʂ	dʐ	tɕ	dʑ								
Non-sibilant affricate	pɸ	bβ	p̪f	b̪v			t̪θ	d̪ð	tɹ̝̊	dɹ̝	t̠ɹ̠̊˔	d̠ɹ̠˔			cç	ɟʝ	kx	ɡɣ	qχ	ɢʁ	ʡʜ	ʡʢ	ʔh	
Sibilant fricative							s̪	z̪	s	z	ʃ	ʒ	ʂ	ʐ	ɕ	ʑ								
Non-sibilant fricative	ɸ	β	f	v	θ̼	ð̼	θ	ð	θ̠	ð̠	ɹ̠̊˔	ɹ̠˔	ɻ̊˔	ɻ˔	ç	ʝ	x	ɣ	χ	ʁ	ħ	ʕ	h	ɦ
Approximant		β̞		ʋ				ð̞		ɹ		ɹ̠		ɻ		j		ɰ						˷
Tap/flap		ⱱ̟		ⱱ					ɾ̥	ɾ			ɽ̊	ɽ						ɢ̆		ʡ̆		
Trill	ʙ̥	ʙ							r̥	r		r̠	ɽ̊r̥	ɽr					ʀ̥	ʀ	ʜ	ʢ		
Lateral affricate									tɬ	dɮ			tꞎ	d𝼅	c𝼆	ɟʎ̝	k𝼄	ɡʟ̝						
Lateral fricative							ɬ̪		ɬ	ɮ			ꞎ	𝼅	𝼆	ʎ̝	𝼄	ʟ̝						
Lateral approximant								l̪	l̥	l		l̠	ɭ̊	ɭ	ʎ̥	ʎ	ʟ̥	ʟ		ʟ̠				
Lateral tap/flap									ɺ̥	ɺ			𝼈̊	𝼈		ʎ̆		ʟ̆						

		BL	LD	D	A	PA	RF	P	V	U
Implosive	Voiced	ɓ			ɗ		ᶑ	ʄ	ɠ	ʛ
Implosive	Voiceless	ɓ̥			ɗ̥		ᶑ̊	ʄ̊	ɠ̊	ʛ̥
Ejective	Stop	pʼ			tʼ		ʈʼ	cʼ	kʼ	qʼ
Ejective	Affricate		p̪fʼ	tθʼ	tsʼ	tʃʼ	tʂʼ	tɕʼ	kxʼ	qχʼ
Ejective	Fricative	ɸʼ	fʼ	θʼ	sʼ	ʃʼ	ʂʼ	ɕʼ	xʼ	χʼ
Ejective	Lateral affricate				tɬʼ			c𝼆ʼ	k𝼄ʼ	q𝼄ʼ
Ejective	Lateral fricative				ɬʼ					
Click (top: velar; bottom: uvular)	Tenuis	kʘ qʘ		kǀ qǀ	kǃ qǃ		k𝼊 q𝼊	kǂ qǂ		
Click (top: velar; bottom: uvular)	Voiced	ɡʘ ɢʘ		ɡǀ ɢǀ	ɡǃ ɢǃ		ɡ𝼊 ɢ𝼊	ɡǂ ɢǂ		
Click (top: velar; bottom: uvular)	Nasal	ŋʘ ɴʘ		ŋǀ ɴǀ	ŋǃ ɴǃ		ŋ𝼊 ɴ𝼊	ŋǂ ɴǂ	ʞ	
Click (top: velar; bottom: uvular)	Tenuis lateral				kǁ qǁ					
Click (top: velar; bottom: uvular)	Voiced lateral				ɡǁ ɢǁ					
Click (top: velar; bottom: uvular)	Nasal lateral				ŋǁ ɴǁ					
