= West Savu =

- District
- Location of Savu Island in East Nusa Tenggara Province

- Location in Indonesia
- Coordinates: 10°30′14″S 121°50′8″E
- Country: Indonesia
- Region: Lesser Sunda Islands
- Province: East Nusa Tenggara
- Regency: Sabu Raijua

Area
  - Total: 185.16 km^{2} (71.49 sq mi)

Population (2020 Census)
  - Total: 33,225
  - Density: 179.44/km^{2} (464.75/sq mi)

West Savu is a district of Sabu Raijua Regency, East Nusa Tenggara province of Indonesia, located on Savu Island. It includes the town of Menia, the seat capital of Sabu Raijua Regency.
