= Ti'i langga =

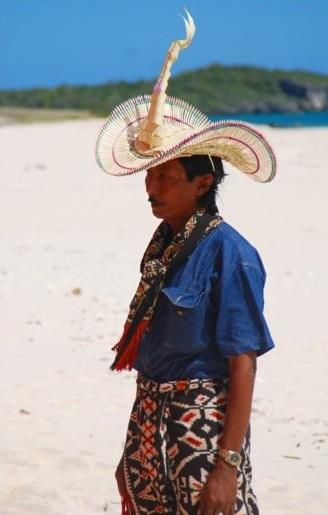
A man wearing the ti'i langga.

Ti'i langga is the wide-brimmed hat found in Rote Island, eastern Indonesia. Rote Island is the southernmost of the inhabited islands of Indonesia, in the island province of East Nusa Tenggara, not far away from Timor. The characteristic feature of the hat is the 40 to 60 centimeter high unicorn-like horn or plume sticking up near the front. Together with the sasando, the ti'i langga is the cultural identity of the culture of Rote island.

== Form and construction ==
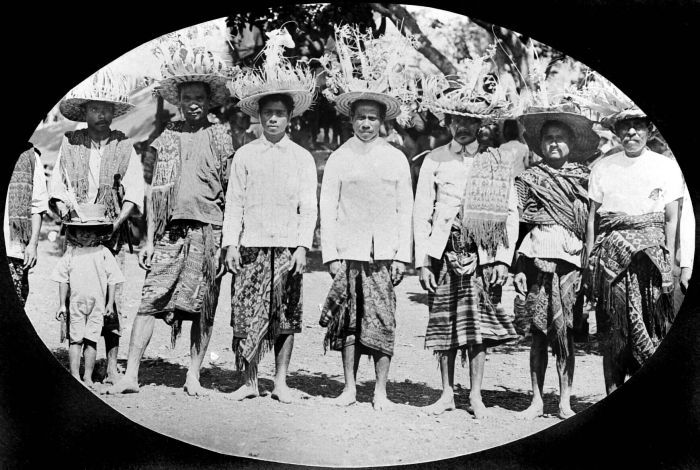
Photograph of Rotenese men in early 20th-century featuring the ti'i langga in various plume shapes.

Today, the ti'i langga takes shape of a wide-brimmed hat, with the sides turned-up. A 40 centimetres (16 in) horn-like "plume" sticks up near the front. They may be plain in color or painted. The ti'i langga is created by weaving young leaves of the lontar palm (Borassus flabellifer).

The horn-like "plume" of the ti'i langga is believed to have been inspired by the plumes of the headgear of the Portuguese men. The Portuguese is the first European to attempt to control the spice trade in the Indonesian archipelago through colonization in the early 16th-century. Dili in East Timor, being abundant in spices, were established as one of the permanent bases of the Portuguese power. The Island of Rote, although not a spice trade destination, fell within the influence of the Portuguese. Portuguese legacy in the southeastern islands of Indonesia remains strong even today.

The brim of the ti'i langga consists of a double layer of braided palm-strips, giving it extra stiffness. It is braided in such a manner as to give the impression of pieces cut out of the sides. This is seen as a proof on how the native Rotenese imitates the European headgear. Whereas in the European headgear the shape was caused by the requirement of the material, in the Rotenese headgear, the shape is copied with no reason. This shows the power of observation of the Rotenese people as well as the skill in copying with limited means. Why this imitation took place in Rote and not elsewhere on other islands visited by the Portuguese or Spaniards remained unexplained.

The shape of the ti'i langga – especially the plume – is found to have evolved from early times. Early 20th-century photographs of the ti'i langga do not always show them with the horn-like plume. Many ti'i langga shows a variety of bizarre-shaped plumes. This can only be explained as the attempt to create the various plume shapes of the European headgear (e.g. on a bonnet or a helmet) using available material (lontar palm leaves). Photograph records also show the ti'i langga designed as plain, with no plumes.

== Custom ==
Today, the ti'i langga is worn by men, although in the past young women sometimes wear them. They may be worn for everyday wear or on ceremonial occasions.

== See also ==
- Sasando
- List of headgear

== Cited works ==
- CIBA Limited (1939). "Ciba-Geigy Review". Ciba Review. 3 (25). Ciba-Geigy Limited.
- Turner, Peter (1998). Indonesia's Eastern Islands. Lonely Planet. ISBN 9780864425034.
