= Nuse Island =

Island in Indonesia

Coordinates: 10.780°S 122.767°E

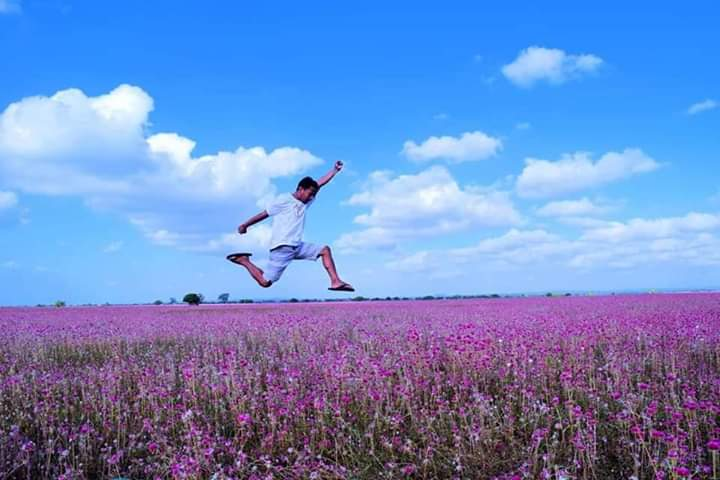
- Flower Field - Nuse island
- Interactive map of Nuse Island

Geography
- Location: South East Asia
- Archipelago: Lesser Sunda Islands

Administration
- Indonesia
- Province: East Nusa Tenggara

Demographics
- Population: c. 2000
- Ethnic groups: Rote, others

Nuse Island (Indonesian: Pulau Nuse) is one of the 17,508 islands that comprise the Republic of Indonesia. The island is located in Ndao Nuse District, Rote Ndao Regency, East Nusa Tenggara. Geographically, Nuse Island is in the southwest of Rote Island.
