= Savu people =

Dou Hawu
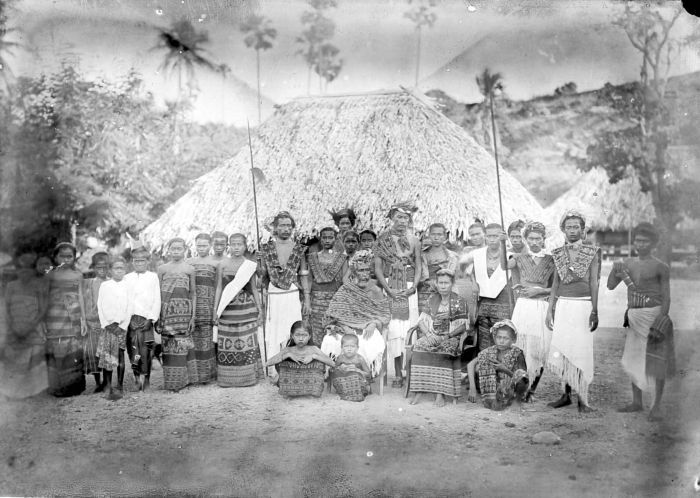
- Raja of Liae with his tribe, 1900s

Total population
- 135,000

Regions with significant populations
- Indonesia (Sawu Island, East Nusa Tenggara)

Languages
- Savu language, Indonesian language

Religion
- Protestant Christian (predominantly), Jingi Tiu (traditional religion)

Related ethnic groups
- Sumba and Ndao

The Savunese people (Savu: Dou Hawu), also known as Sawu, Sabu, or Hawu, are an ethnic group that inhabits Savu and the smaller island of Raijua in East Nusa Tenggara, Indonesia. Linguistically and culturally, it is related to the Sumba people on the neighboring island of Sumba.

Savu had little to interest traders from Europe, or neighbouring kingdoms, and it remained largely insular until the late-20th century.

== Geographical structure ==
Savu originally had six independent domains, Teriwu, Liae, Dimu, Menia, Seba and Mesara. Menia was defeated by Seba in the 19th century, while Teriwu disappeared much earlier.

A raja and fetor of each domain were appointed by the Dutch during colonial times.

After independence Savu was split into two kecamatan, East Savu (Liae and Dimu) and West Savu (Seba and Mesara plus Raijua).

In the 2000s, the political structure of Savu has been reorganised to more closely reflect traditional lines, which retained local significance over and above the arbitrary divisions imposed by the Indonesian government. The kecamatan now are Hawu Mehara, West Savu, Central Savu, East Savu, Liae, and Raijua.

== Genealogy kinship ==
The people of Savu are inherent in having a small family. The Savu people practice bilateral descent, with descendants of one of the udu (patrilineal groups) termed kerogo, as well as a matrilineal descendant that is traced to in Savu mythology to one of two sisters. The moiety of the two sisters is termed hubi; the hubi are divided into wini.

Marriage is between a man and a woman of the same wini as his mother, or at a minimum within the same hubi. There is non-reciprocal gift-giving from the groom's family to that of the bride. Wini and hubi play a role in ceremonies such as weddings, funerals and baptisms. The conclusion of marriage is within the three-year union. The marital residence of a Savu family is patrilocal.

Savunese ikat (traditional weaving) reflect many aspects of Savunese genealogy, including specific motifs and colours representing the weaver's hubu and wini.

Savunese people place importance on genealogy, tracking both hubi and kerogo back through many generations.

== Culture ==
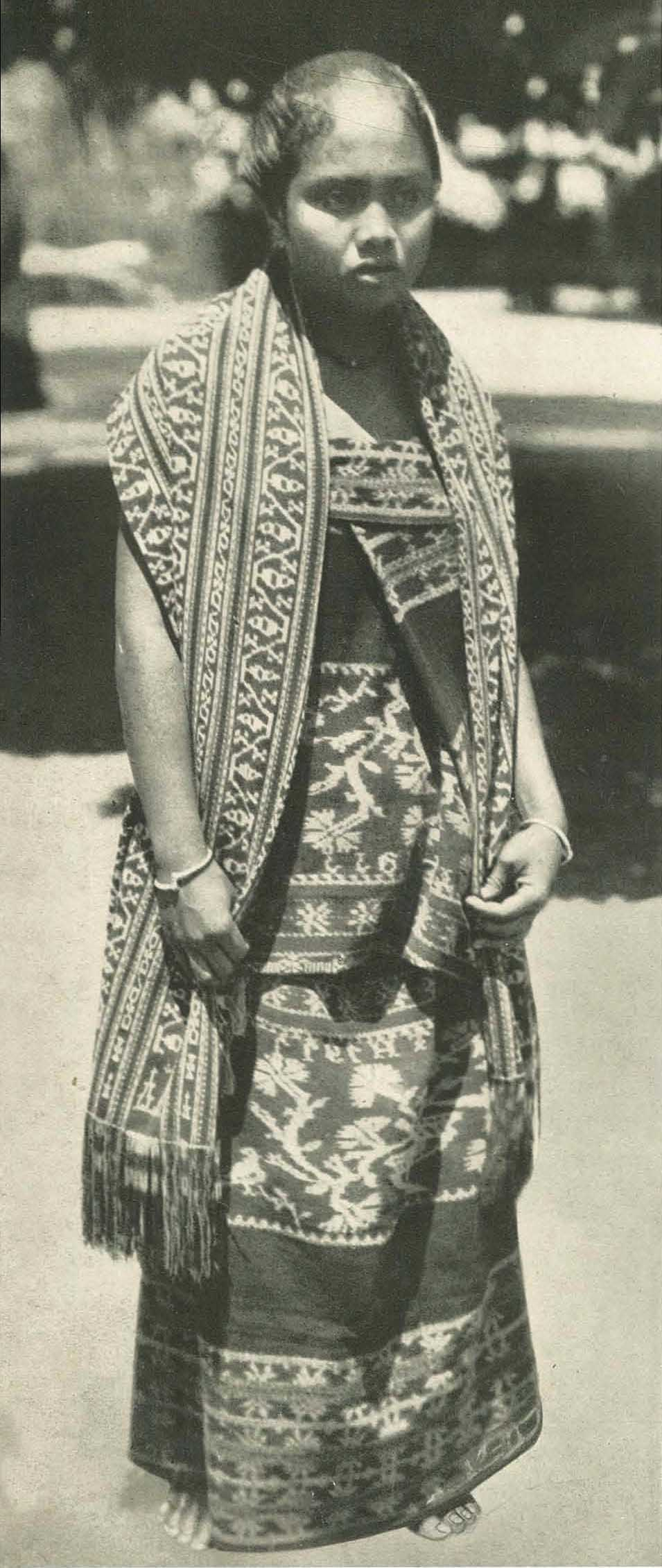
A Savunese girl from Melolo, circa 1950.

The Savunese measure time in units that range from six to 49 years, depending on the domain.

Savunese people place great importance on their genealogy, with names chosen to avoid repetition, and genealogies recited during ritual performances such as at funerals, where the connection of the departed to his or her ancestors is memorialised. The memorising of genealogies has also been observed in neighbouring cultures, in Rote and Kedang.

As with many others parts of Indonesia, betel nut is popular, as indeed is tuak, wine made from the sugar palm, as well as the sap, drunk fresh from the tree. The palm tree is treated with great respect, and the apu lodo priest, descendant of the sun supervises the palm tapping season.

=== Architecture ===
The Savunese house is built on poles, and is designed to resemble a proa boat, with the front beams resembling its bow. There are also anthropomorphic elements in the terminology used to refer to parts of the house.

=== Music ===
Savunese music is based on the gong, and normally accompanies traditional dance. The dho'a dance, known as Padho'a in Kupang Lingua Franca is performed in a circle, holding hands, with dancers rotating their legs clockwise, wearing kedhu'e (beans wrapped in palm leaf to create a rattle). Padho'a/pedho'a derived from Savunese "pe dheja dho'a". The Ledo Hawu dance is performed by mixed pairs, with the men wearing bells.

== Religion ==
=== Jingi Tiu ===
The traditional religion of Savu people is called Jingi Tiu.

Each of the domains of Savu was led by a Jingi Tiu Council of Priests.

Jingi Tiu is a polytheistic religion, with gods of earth, sea and sky, as well as many more minor spirits.

=== Protestantism ===
Evangelism began in 1854, and increased its impetus after 1861, when Esser, Dutch resident of Kupang, called for schools and a Christian teacher from Ambon in Savu. Since the 1970s, when the Indonesian encouraged people throughout Indonesia to adopt Islam or Christianity, Protestantism has been in the ascendancy, with 80% of Savu people now Protestant, and Jingi Tiu on the decline. Despite this, many aspects of Jingi Tiu belief still influence Christian worship in Savu.

== Occupation ==
The traditional occupation of the Savunese people is farming; where in some places an irrigation system is used. Crops such as rice, corn, millet and beans are usually grown. The Savu people make sweet syrup and wine from the juice of a lone palm tree. Savunese people also breed small cattle, buffaloes and horses, and practice cockfights. Apart from that, they also engage in fishing. Weaving and braiding is considered as part of traditional crafts.

== Settlements ==
Their housing are framed columns with gable roofing. Traditional settlements are cumulus structured, with a temple and stone shrines in the center square, surrounded by stone walls. While the harvest is ripening, they would live in temporary huts in the fields.
