= Nikodemus Rihi Heke =

Indonesian politician (born 1962)

Regent of Sabu Raijua
- In office 16 September 2021 – 20 February 2025
- In office 15 November 2016 – 17 February 2021; Acting from 15 November 2016 – 14 February 2019
- Preceded by: Marthen Dira Tome
- Succeeded by: Krisman Bernard Riwu Kore

Personal details
- Born: Nikodemus Nithanel Rihi Heke; 14 November 1962 (age 63) Kupang, East Nusa Tenggara, Indonesia

Nikodemus Nithanel Rihi Heke (born 14 November 1962) is an Indonesian politician and former civil servant. He served as the regent of Sabu Raijua Regency in East Nusa Tenggara from 2016 to 2025. He had previously been Sabu Raijua's vice regent from 2011 to 2016 under Marthen Dira Tome, whom he replaced in 2016 following Tome's arrest.

== Early life and education ==
Nikodemus Nithanel Rihi Heke was born on 14 November 1962 in Kupang, East Nusa Tenggara. He spent his childhood there, enrolling at a public elementary school and a middle school in the city. He graduated high school at the Palapa High School in Kupang in 1981, after which he studied administrative science at Nusa Cendana University. He obtained his bachelor's degree in 1985. He later obtained a master's degree in 2002 from Padjadjaran University in Bandung.

== Career ==
Heke joined the civil service in 1989, starting his career in the municipal government of Kupang Regency. In 1992, he was appointed the district head (camat) of East Kupang district in the regency, a position he held until 2000. After a two-year study assignment in Bandung, he returned to Kupang's regency government and worked there until 2009, when he moved to Sabu Raijua Regency where he became regional inspector.

In 2010, Heke became the running mate of Marthen Dira Tome Sabu Raijua's first direct regency election. Tome and Heke received the endorsement of Golkar, and the pair secured 12,715 votes (35.83 percent) to defeat six other candidate pairs. Heke was sworn in as vice regent on 24 January 2011. Heke remained as Tome's running mate in the 2015 regency election, with the pair being elected for a second term with 23,912 votes (59.26 percent).

On 14 November 2016, Tome was arrested by the Corruption Eradication Commission due to a corruption case, and Heke was appointed as acting regent in his place. He was officially sworn in as regent on 14 February 2019. His term saw the continuation of Tome's infrastructure development programs in the regency.

Heke ran for reelection in the 2020 elections, and in the initial election lost to Orient P Riwu Kore. However, Kore was disqualified by the Constitutional Court of Indonesia from the election when it became known that he held U.S. citizenship. A repeat election was held in July 2021, and Heke with his running mate Yohanis Uly Kale won the election with 21,847 votes (56%). Heke was sworn in for a second term on 16 September 2021. His term lasted until 20 February 2025.

== Personal life ==
He is married to Marthina Raga Lay, and the couple has three children.
