= Dana Island (Sabu Raijua) =

Island in Sabu Raijua Regency, Indonesia

Coordinates: 10°49′31″S 121°16′51″E

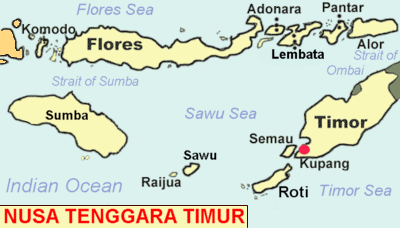
Map of the Dana Island region in Indonesia

Dana is a small uninhabited island in Indonesia. It is also known by the names Pulau Dana, Ndana, Nieuw Eiland and Hokki.

== Island of Spirits ==
The island lies to southwest of Sawu Island in the Sabu Raijua Regency and 30 kilometers from Raijua island. The island is not visited throughout the year except on one annual pilgrimage by the Raijua elders and people per year. It is believed in the ancestral culture that it is inhabited by the spirits of their ancestors and that they should be respected and left in peace. The island is barred to all westerners and outsiders unless consulting with the elders first.

== Geography, flora and fauna ==
The southern side is steep with cliffs and the water carries a heavy current and swells. The island is inhabited by goats, and sheep. This island is mostly a dead island, with very few human visitors.
