= Voiceless upper-pharyngeal plosive =

Rare consonant

ꞯ

q᫢

q̠

Audio sample
- source · help

Encoding
- Entity (decimal): &#42927;
- Unicode (hex): U+A7AF
Image

A voiceless upper-pharyngeal plosive or stop is a rare consonant. No language is known to have a phonemic upper pharyngeal plosive. The Nǁng language (Nǀuu) is claimed to have an upper pharyngeal place of articulation among its click consonants— clicks in Nǁng have a rear closure that is said to vary between uvular or upper pharyngeal, depending on the click type. However, if the place were truly pharyngeal, they could not occur as nasal clicks, which they do.

Otherwise, upper pharyngeal plosives are only known from disordered speech. They appear for example in the speech of some children with cleft palate, as compensatory backing of stops to avoid nasalizing them. (Note: Pharyngeal nasals are not possible.) The extIPA provides the letter ⟨ꞯ⟩ (a small capital Q), equivalent to IPA ⟨q᫢⟩ or ⟨q̠⟩ (a retracted ⟨q⟩) to transcribe such a sound.

Pharyngeal and epiglottal consonants are pronounced in the upper and lower pharynx, respectively, and because of this they are often labeled "upper pharyngeal" and "lower pharyngeal". If the consonants labeled as epiglottal fricatives in the International Phonetic Alphabet chart, [ʜ ʢ], are analyzed as trills, which they generally are phonetically, then all three epiglottal letters fit in gaps in the pharyngeal column of the consonant table in the chart. This has led phoneticians such as John Esling to propose merging the epiglottal consonants into the pharyngeal column of the chart. This would leave no room for the extIPA letters. As it is, the extIPA chart places the letters ⟨ꞯ 𝼂⟩ in the plosive cell of an "upper pharyngeal" column.

== Features ==
Features of a voiceless upper-pharyngeal stop:

- Its manner of articulation is occlusive, which means it is produced by obstructing airflow in the vocal tract. Since the consonant is also oral, with no nasal outlet, it is a plosive.
- Its place of articulation is upper pharyngeal, which means it is articulated with the tongue root against the back of the throat (the pharynx) and then retracting the root of the tongue to the mid to high part of the pharynx.
- Its phonation is voiceless, which means it is produced without vibrations of the vocal cords.
- It is an oral consonant, which means that air is not allowed to escape through the nose.
- It is a median consonant, which means it is produced by directing the airstream down the midline of the tongue, rather than to the sides.
- Its airstream mechanism is pulmonic, which means it is articulated by pushing air only with the intercostal muscles and abdominal muscles, as in most speech sounds.

== See also ==
- Voiced upper-pharyngeal plosive

== Notes ==
| Place → | Labial | | | | | Coronal | | | | | | | | | | Dorsal | | | | | Laryngeal | | | |
| Manner ↓ | Bilabial | | Labiodental | | Linguolabial | | Dental | | Alveolar | | Postalveolar | | Retroflex | | (Alveolo-)palatal | | Velar | | Uvular | | Pharyngeal/epiglottal | | Glottal | |
|---|---|---|---|---|---|---|---|---|---|---|---|---|---|---|---|---|---|---|---|---|---|---|---|---|
| Nasal | m̥ | m | ɱ̊ | ɱ | | n̼ | n̪̊ | n̪ | n̥ | n | n̠̊ | n̠ | ɳ̊ | ɳ | ɲ̊ | ɲ | ŋ̊ | ŋ | ɴ̥ | ɴ | | | | |
| Plosive | p | b | p̪ | b̪ | t̼ | d̼ | t̪ | d̪ | t | d | | | ʈ | ɖ | c | ɟ | k | ɡ | q | ɢ | ʡ | | ʔ | |
| Sibilant affricate | | | | | | | t̪s̪ | d̪z̪ | ts | dz | t̠ʃ | d̠ʒ | tʂ | dʐ | tɕ | dʑ | | | | | | | | |
| Non-sibilant affricate | pɸ | bβ | p̪f | b̪v | | | t̪θ | d̪ð | tɹ̝̊ | dɹ̝ | t̠ɹ̠̊˔ | d̠ɹ̠˔ | | | cç | ɟʝ | kx | ɡɣ | qχ | ɢʁ | ʡʜ | ʡʢ | ʔh | |
| Sibilant fricative | | | | | | | s̪ | z̪ | s | z | ʃ | ʒ | ʂ | ʐ | ɕ | ʑ | | | | | | | | |
| Non-sibilant fricative | ɸ | β | f | v | θ̼ | ð̼ | θ | ð | θ̠ | ð̠ | ɹ̠̊˔ | ɹ̠˔ | ɻ̊˔ | ɻ˔ | ç | ʝ | x | ɣ | χ | ʁ | ħ | ʕ | h | ɦ |
| Approximant | | β̞ | | ʋ | | | | ð̞ | | ɹ | | ɹ̠ | | ɻ | | j | | ɰ | | | | | | ˷ |
| Tap/flap | | ⱱ̟ | | ⱱ | | | | | ɾ̥ | ɾ | | | ɽ̊ | ɽ | | | | | | ɢ̆ | | ʡ̆ | | |
| Trill | ʙ̥ | ʙ | | | | | | | r̥ | r | | r̠ | ɽ̊r̥ | ɽr | | | | | ʀ̥ | ʀ | ʜ | ʢ | | |
| Lateral affricate | | | | | | | | | tɬ | dɮ | | | tꞎ | d𝼅 | c𝼆 | ɟʎ̝ | k𝼄 | ɡʟ̝ | | | | | | |
| Lateral fricative | | | | | | | ɬ̪ | | ɬ | ɮ | | | ꞎ | 𝼅 | 𝼆 | ʎ̝ | 𝼄 | ʟ̝ | | | | | | |
| Lateral approximant | | | | | | | | l̪ | l̥ | l | | l̠ | ɭ̊ | ɭ | ʎ̥ | ʎ | ʟ̥ | ʟ | | ʟ̠ | | | | |
| Lateral tap/flap | | | | | | | | | ɺ̥ | ɺ | | | 𝼈̊ | 𝼈 | | ʎ̆ | | ʟ̆ | | | | | | |

| | | BL | LD | D | A | PA | RF | P | V | U |
|---|---|---|---|---|---|---|---|---|---|---|
| Implosive | Voiced | ɓ | | | ɗ | | ᶑ | ʄ | ɠ | ʛ |
| Implosive | Voiceless | ɓ̥ | | | ɗ̥ | | ᶑ̊ | ʄ̊ | ɠ̊ | ʛ̥ |
| Ejective | Stop | pʼ | | | tʼ | | ʈʼ | cʼ | kʼ | qʼ |
| Ejective | Affricate | | p̪fʼ | tθʼ | tsʼ | tʃʼ | tʂʼ | tɕʼ | kxʼ | qχʼ |
| Ejective | Fricative | ɸʼ | fʼ | θʼ | sʼ | ʃʼ | ʂʼ | ɕʼ | xʼ | χʼ |
| Ejective | Lateral affricate | | | | tɬʼ | | | c𝼆ʼ | k𝼄ʼ | q𝼄ʼ |
| Ejective | Lateral fricative | | | | ɬʼ | | | | | |
| Click (top: velar; bottom: uvular) | Tenuis | kʘ qʘ | | kǀ qǀ | kǃ qǃ | | k𝼊 q𝼊 | kǂ qǂ | | |
| Click (top: velar; bottom: uvular) | Voiced | ɡʘ ɢʘ | | ɡǀ ɢǀ | ɡǃ ɢǃ | | ɡ𝼊 ɢ𝼊 | ɡǂ ɢǂ | | |
| Click (top: velar; bottom: uvular) | Nasal | ŋʘ ɴʘ | | ŋǀ ɴǀ | ŋǃ ɴǃ | | ŋ𝼊 ɴ𝼊 | ŋǂ ɴǂ | ʞ | |
| Click (top: velar; bottom: uvular) | Tenuis lateral | | | | kǁ qǁ | | | | | |
| Click (top: velar; bottom: uvular) | Voiced lateral | | | | ɡǁ ɢǁ | | | | | |
| Click (top: velar; bottom: uvular) | Nasal lateral | | | | ŋǁ ɴǁ | | | | | |
