= Nembrala =

- Village
- Location within Indonesia
- Coordinates: 10.889027184°S 122.8249486°E
- Country: Indonesia
- Province: East Nusa Tenggara
- Regency: Rote Ndao regency
- District: Rote Barat district

Nembrala or Nemberala is a village (desa) on Rote Island, in Rote Barat district, Rote Ndao regency, East Nusa Tenggara (Nusa Tenggara Timur) province, Indonesia.

It is a well known surfing spot.

== Surfing ==
The main wave at Nembrala has several sections, which can link up on bigger days.

-The Point

-Temples or Steeples.

-Mountains

-Lower Mountains/Beginners/Inner Tubes.

- Type of wave: coral reef
- Length: usually 200-300m, but can get over 500m on really big days.
- Size: 2 to 15 feet+ (~4 to 30 feet+ faces).
- Best tide: low. There is a very large tidal range of about 6m+. The wave breaks on all tides, but is generally better on lower tides.
- Dangers: coral reef bottom, inexperienced surfers, hold-downs in big swells, and very remote location. Sunburn and long paddles. The wave is more than a kilometre offshore, which is a very long paddle at high tide without a boat. Sea urchins on the bottom.
- Quality: it's not a true barreling, Indonesian-style wave, in comparison to other, more famous waves in Indonesia. Usually a long wall, but can barrel on rarer occasions, especially on lower tides.

The wave tends to be bigger and better when the swell is more west, and suffers from lengthy flat spells. It can hold virtually any size swell, the main problem being the very strong winds in season, which make getting into bigger waves more difficult, (over 25 knots at times). The wave is unusual in that it often gets bigger further down the wave, due to focusing from refraction.

There are numerous other waves in the area, of low to excellent quality, although access is sometimes only by boat, and some of these won't work at different times of the very large tidal range of more than 6m.

These include Boa, Sucky Mamas, Dana, Do'a, the Bommie, and several other offshore island waves, as well as waves further around to the east of the island sometimes without a name, although these need very large swells.
