= Raijua =

Island in Indonesia

Coordinates: 10°37′11″S 121°34′24″E

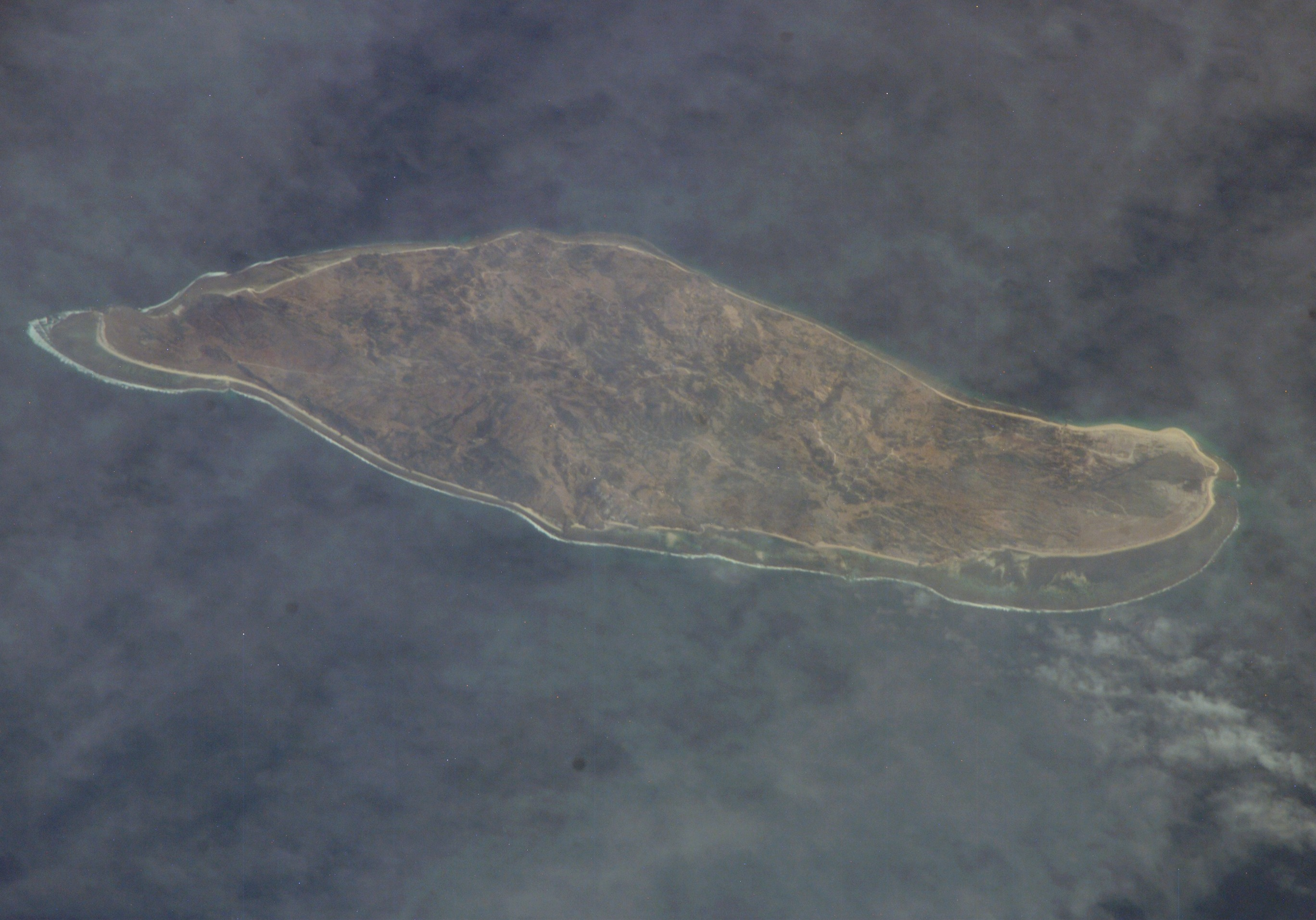
- International Space Station view of Raijua

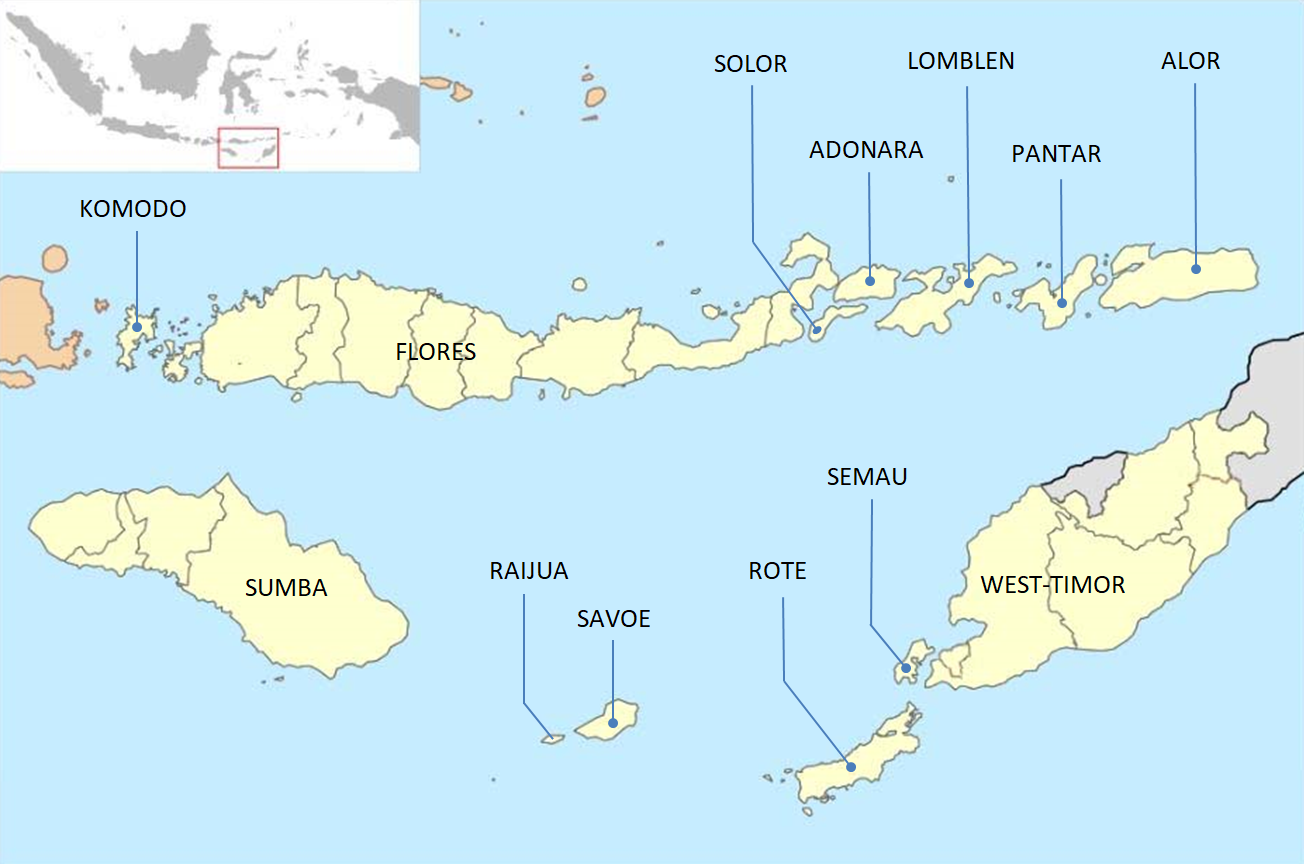
- Raijua labelled in East Nusa Tenggara
- Interactive map of Raijua

Geography
- Location: Indian Ocean: Savu Sea
- Archipelago: Lesser Sunda Islands
- Area: 37.16 km^{2} (14.35 sq mi) (Note: Area of Raijua island as listed by the Ministry of Home Affairs. Statistics Indonesia gives the area of Raijua district, which also includes the uninhabited island of Dana, at 36.97 square kilometres (14.27 sq mi). According to the Home Affairs Ministry, Dana's area is 0.78 square kilometres (0.30 sq mi).)

Administration
- Indonesia
- Province: East Nusa Tenggara
- Regency: Sabu Raijua
- District: Raijua

Demographics
- Population: 9,462 (2024 est.)

Additional information
- Time zone: WITA (UTC+8)

Raijua is an island located in the Savu Sea, part of the Lesser Sunda Islands of Indonesia. It is administratively part of the Sabu Raijua Regency of East Nusa Tenggara, forming a single district within the regency along with the uninhabited Dana Island. Raijua has an area of approximately 36 square kilometres (14 sq mi), consisting largely of tropical savannas with limited water available.

The island is inhabited by over nine thousand people, largely of the Savu ethnic group. The population are largely Protestant Christian with a significant minority of the Jingitiu traditional religion. Local agriculture is centered around the production of seaweed, with traditional agricultural mainstays being sorghum and the lontar palm. It is also known for locally weaved tenun cloths and for the production of sea salt. The island is considered as an underdeveloped region by the Government of Indonesia, with a PLN grid only being established on the island in 2013.

Throughout much of its history, Raijua had a single raja (king), in contrast to multiple polities on the larger neighboring island of Savu. European contact began in the seventeenth century but direct control or interaction with the Dutch colonial government was initially limited due to the island's remoteness. Raijua's raja maintained significant political autonomy throughout the nineteenth century. Colonial authority over the island gradually increased, and the island was subsumed into Savu administratively by 1918. Raijua became a standalone political unit again in 1992, when its current district was formed.

== Geography ==
Raijua is an island measuring around 36 square kilometres (14 sq mi) in area, roughly 12.9 kilometres (8.0 mi) long and 4.8 kilometres (3.0 mi) wide. It is separated by the narrow, 3.5 miles (5.6 km) wide Raijua Strait from the larger island of Savu (or Sabu). The highest point of the island, located about at its center, rises 165 meters above sea level. The island's bedrock is primarily composed of limestone and uplifted coral reefs, and the island's landscape is dominated by tropical savannas receiving less than 1,000 mm of rainfall annually.

== History ==
Raijua was likely inhabited prior to Savu itself, which in turn was likely to have been settled prior to 1250 AD. Savu folklore claim that the ethnic group descended from settlers originating in Surat in Gujarat, India, who first settled Raijua before moving to Savu with their descendants dividing up the two islands between clans – Raijua becoming the territory of one clan. Local traditions claim that the islands of Raijua and Savu were also settled by refugees from the fall of the Majapahit in Java, though this claim is doubted by scholars. Europeans began to arrive in the region around the early sixteenth century, but did not pay much attention to Raijua or Savu. Raijua was mentioned in a Portuguese map from 1602 (as "Rajoan", with the map lacking Savu), and later in another map from 1615.

Dutch presence (via the Dutch East India Company/VOC) in Savu and Raijua began in the 1650s, with the objective being the acquisition of slaves. The local VOC opperhoofd (officer in charge) based in Kupang conducted an unsuccessful slave raid on Raijua in 1659. VOC did not actively participate much in the local affairs of Savu and Raijua throughout the seventeenth and eighteenth centuries, with Raijua engaging in trade of cattle with Makassarese merchants in violation of a VOC monopoly. In 1756, the local rajas of Savu signed a contract of alliance with VOC, but the raja of Raijua did not sign it initially. James Cook, who visited Savu in 1770, wrote that Raijua could raise 1,500 fighting men (likely an exaggerated figure, according to historian James J. Fox). In the late eighteenth and early nineteenth centuries, the rajas of Raijua took part in conflicts in nearby Sumba, and troops from Raijua took part in a Dutch expedition against Amanuban in West Timor.

Throughout the rest of the nineteenth century, Raijua largely handled its own affairs, with limited interference from either the Dutch or neighboring polities in Savu. During the late 1860s and the early 1870s, the island (along with Savu) was struck by a smallpox epidemic, which killed around half the population of both islands. Late in the century, the Dutch began increasing their presence in Savu, opening schools and posting government officials, with eight schools opened by 1903. The first colonial school in Raijua was opened sometime after 1903, and before 1920. Christianity also began to spread in this period, with the last raja of Raijua Paulus Lai converting sometime in the late 1910s. He was discharged by the Dutch in 1918, and Raijua was subsumed into a larger Savu polity under the Dutch East Indies.

Within independent Indonesia, Raijua was initially administered as part of Kupang Regency, joined along parts of Savu island in the district of West Savu. Raijua was split off as its own district in 1992. When Sabu Raijua Regency was created in 2008, Raijua became one of its constituent districts. In 2021, Cyclone Seroja struck the island and caused significant damage to local infrastructure and cultural sites.

== Demographics ==
According to the 2020 Indonesian census, Raijua (as Raijua district) had a population of 8,950, an increase from 7,678 in the 2010 census and 6,578 in the 2000 census. During the Dutch colonial period, the island had a population density of 114 inhabitants per square kilometre (300/sq mi) in 1930 corresponding to a population of over 4,000, and in 1832 a Dutch report placed the island's population at 415 "able-bodied men" (around one-fourth of the population). The official estimate for the population is 9,462 as of 2024, in 2,977 households.

Like in Savu, Raijua is primarily inhabited by the Savu people. The Raijuan people are traditionally divided up into twelve clans. According to a 2016 estimate, around 82 percent of the population adheres to Protestant Christianity, and another 4 percent to Roman Catholicism with small numbers of Muslims. A further 12.8 percent of the population, primarily adherents of the Jingitiu traditional religion, are classified as "others" in Indonesian government statistics. The island has eight elementary schools, two public middle schools, and one public high school. There is a single Puskesmas (government-funded health clinics) on the island, and a hospital was also inaugurated but remained non-operational due to a lack of equipment as of June 2025.

== Economy and services ==
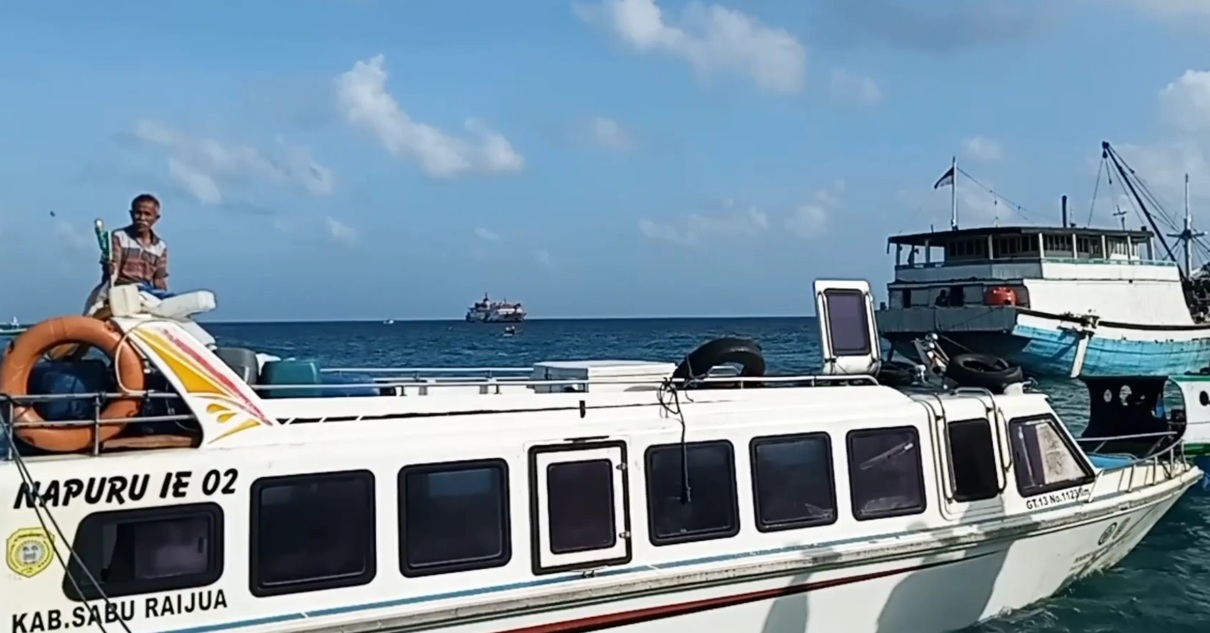
Several boats at Raijua pier, 2022.

Raijua suffers from water shortages, with each household reportedly having access to just 20 litres (5.3 US gal) of water daily in 2020. Traditionally, sorghum is a major crop in the island, along with lontar palm (Borassus flabellifer) trees which are sapped to make palm sugar. Palm sugar was historically consumed as a dietary staple, while other foods (sorghum or rice) were only eaten every few days. In some parts of Raijua's inland areas, the soil has enough fertility to support rice cultivation. To generate additional income, many women on the island weaved tenun cloths, primarily selling them to collectors. Weaving activities have transitioned from using traditional hand-spun yarn and natural dyes following a series of thefts in the 1980s and 1990s, and by 2010 imported cotton threads and industrial dyes were dominant. Sea salt is also produced from evaporation ponds in Raijua, with around 30 hectares (74 acres) of ponds active in 2020 and another 50 hectares (120 acres) being opened.

Since the 1990s, seaweed farming has become highly important to Raijua's economy and displaced lontar and sorghum farming with the latter being mostly cultivated at higher elevations. Seaweed farming had also resulted in the increased consumption of rice, subsidized by the Indonesian government and imported in exchange for seaweed products. According to the local government, over 1,400 households in Raijua were dependent on seaweed farming in 2016, compared to 350 who worked as fishermen. Local religious customs adapted to the introduced crop by naming it wawi dahi ("sea pig"), and Jingitiu religious leaders introduced restrictions on seaweed farming activities during the rainy season (due to high winds and rough seas).

The primary transport link from the island to other parts of Indonesia is through boat. Raijua's old pier could handle ships of up to 3,000 gross tons and was constructed in the 1980s. In 2018, the pier was heavily damaged by high waves, and the Ministry of Transport constructed a new pier which was completed in 2022. Raijua is around 1.5 hours away by sea from Savu, and is served by cargo ships of the Sea Toll Program going from Ende to Savu.

Raijua was classified as a "3T" (Tertinggal, Terluar, Terdepan; lit. "Undeveloped, Outlying, Frontier") island by the Government of Indonesia in 2014, resulting in additional attention for the provision of basic services. PLN, the Indonesian state-owned electricity company, began to provide electricity in Raijua in 2013, following the opening of a 150 kWp solar power facility on the island. As of 2025, an expansion of the island's electrical network with additional solar facilities and diesel generators was underway. The state-owned telecommunications company Telkomsel operates at least one base transceiver station on Raijua, which provides some network coverage on the island. Bank NTT, owned by the provincial government, operates a sub-branch in Raijua.

== Administration ==
As of 2024, the island is subdivided into two urban villages/subdistricts (kelurahan) and three villages:

Name	Area (km^{2})	Population (2024 est.)	Status
Ballu	2.96	1,610	Village
Bolua	9.64	1,973	Village
Ledeke	3.90	1,136	Kelurahan
Ledeunu	10.53	3,194	Kelurahan
Kolorae	9.94 (Note: Includes the uninhabited island of Dana.)	1,549	Village

The district office, along with the local Puskesmas and banking branch, are located in Ledeunu. Politically, the island forms part of an electoral district for Sabu Raijua's Regional House of Representatives (DPRD), along with Hawu Mehara district in Savu.
