= Sabu Raijua Regency =

Regency in East Nusa Tenggara, Indonesia

Sabu Raijua Regency Kabupaten Sabu Raijua
- Regency
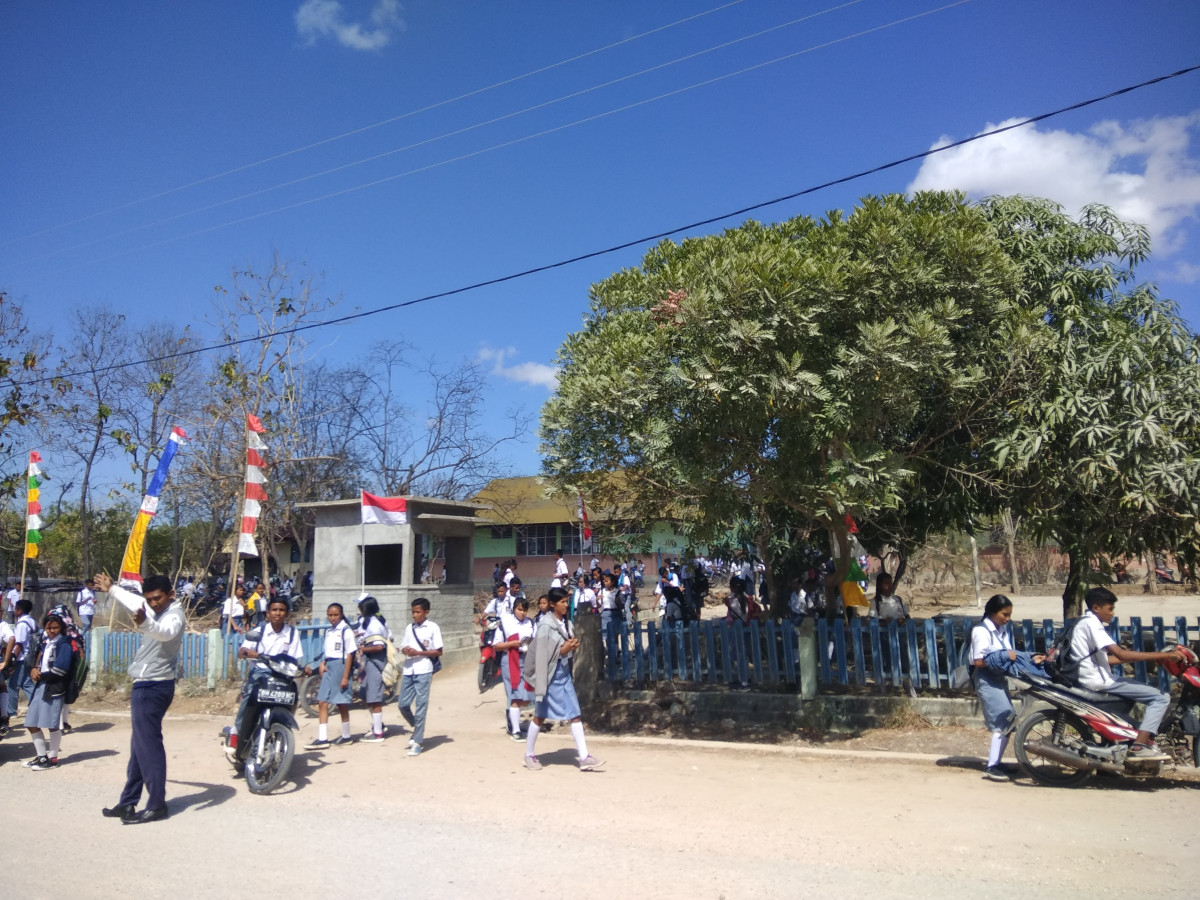
- A school in West Savu

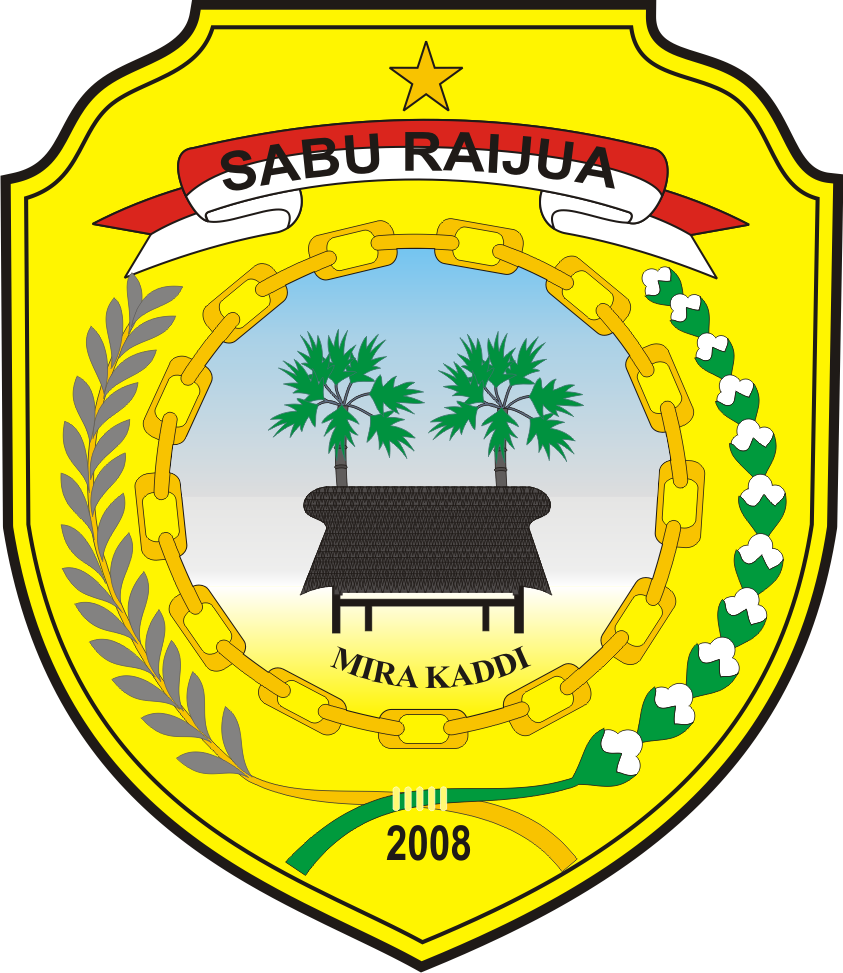
- Coat of arms

- Location within East Nusa Tenggara

- Location in Lesser Sunda Islands and Indonesia Sabu Raijua Regency (Indonesia)
- Coordinates: 10.5629°S 121.7889°E
- Country: Indonesia
- Region: Lesser Sunda Islands
- Province: East Nusa Tenggara
- Established: 26 November 2008
- Capital: Menia, West Savu

Government
  - Regent: Krisman Bernard Riwu Kore
  - Vice Regent: Thobias Uly

Area
  - Total: 459.58 km^{2} (177.44 sq mi)

Population (mid 2025 estimate)
  - Total: 96,259
  - Density: 209.45/km^{2} (542.47/sq mi)
- Area code: (+62) 380
- Website: saburaijuakab.go.id

Sabu Raijua Regency is one of the regencies in the province of East Nusa Tenggara, Indonesia. This regency has a land area of 459.58 km^{2} which includes two main islands in the Sawu Sea, namely Sabu Island and Raijua Island, plus uninhabited Rai Dana Island. Sabu Island is the largest and is the center of government with its capital in West Sabu district, while Raijua Island is smaller and located to the west of Sabu Island. The regency was established by Indonesia's Minister of Home Affairs, Mardiyanto, on 29 October 2008, when it was partitioned from Kupang Regency. The population was 72,960 at the 2010 census, and 89,327 at the 2020 Census; the official estimate as of mid-2025 was 96,259 (comprising 48,972 males and 47,287 females).

Sabu Raijua Regency offers the charm of stunning natural tourism, especially with the beauty of its pristine white sand beaches. One of the main destinations is Napae Beach on Sabu Island, which is famous for its clear sea water and beautiful coral reefs, ideal for snorkeling and diving. In addition, Bukit Ledeae presents a stunning view of dry hills combined with the expanse of blue ocean. Sabu Raijua also has rich marine biodiversity, making it a perfect place for nature lovers and adventurers.

== Politics ==
As with other Indonesian regencies, the municipal government consists of a directly elected bupati (regent) serving five-year terms and a Regional House of Representatives (DPRD). The first regency election in Sabu Raijua was held in 2010, which elected Marthen Dira Tome as regent and Nikodemus Rihi Heke as vice regent. The local DPRD in the 2024–2029 term has 20 members.

== Administration ==
The regency is divided into six districts (kecamatan), tabulated below with their areas and their populations at the 2010 Census and 2020 Census, together with the official estimates as of mid-2025. Note all districts are on Sabu Island except for Raijua District, which encompasses Rai Jua or Raijua Island (37.27 km^{2}) and uninhabited Rai Dana Island (0.89 km^{2}) much further to the west. The table also includes the location of the district administrative centres, the number of administrative villages in each district (totaling 58 rural desa and 5 urban kelurahan), and its post code.

Kode Wilayah	Name of District (kecamatan)	English name	Area in km^{2}	Pop'n Census 2010	Pop'n Census 2020	Pop'n Estimate mid 2025	Admin centre	No. of villages	Post code
53.20.06	Raijua	Raijua Island	38.16	7,671	8,950	9,298	Ledeunu	5 ^{(a)}	85393
53.20.05	Hawu Mehara	(Southwest Savu)	62.81	15,361	18,664	19,784	Tana Jawa	12	85391
53.20.04	Sabu Liae	(South Savu)	57.62	8,847	10,718	11,345	Eilogu	8	85396
53.20.01	Sabu Barat	West Savu	185.16	26,463	33,225	35,797	Seba	10 ^{(b)}	85395
53.20.02	Sabu Tengah	Central Savu	78.62	7,165	8,833	9,431	Eimadake	10	85392
53.20.03	Sabu Timur	East Savu	37.21	7,453	8,937	10,604	Bolou	18 ^{(c)}	85394
	Totals		459.58	72,960	89,327	96,259	Menia	63	

Notes: (a) including 2 kelurahan - Ledeunu and Ledeke. (b) including one kelurahan - Mebba. (c) including 2 kelurahan - Bolou and Limaggu.
