= Dhao language =

Language spoken on Ndao island Indonesia

Dhao
- Ndao
- Pronunciation: [ˈɖ͡ʐao]
- Native to: Indonesia
- Region: Lesser Sunda Islands
- Ethnicity: Dhao
- Native speakers: (5,000 cited 1997)
- Language family: Austronesian: Malayo-Polynesian; Sumba–Flores?; Sumba–Hawu; Savu; Dhao
- Writing system: Latin

Language codes
- ISO 639-3: nfa
- Glottolog: dhao1237
- ELP: Dhao
- Location of Ndao island, where Dhao is spoken. Ndao island (Indonesia)
- Coordinates: 10°49′S 122°40′E

The Dhao language, better known to outsiders by its Rotinese name Ndao (Ndaonese, Ndaundau), is the language of Ndao Island in Indonesia. It is a member of the Sumba language in the Austronesian family. It was once considered a dialect of Hawu, but is not mutually intelligible.

== Phonology ==
Dhao phonology is similar to that of Hawu, but somewhat more complex in its consonants.

Consonants
		Labial	Alveolar	Palatal	Velar	Pharyngeal	Glottal
Nasal		m	n	ɲ	ŋ		
Plosive	voiceless	p	t	tʃ	k		ʔ
Plosive	voiced	b	d	dʒ	ɡ		
Plosive	implosive	ɓ	ɗ	ʄ	ɠ		
Fricative		(f)	s			ʕ~∅	h
Affricate		bβ	ɖʐ				
Approximant		(w)	l, r	(j)			

Consonants of the /n/ column are apical, those of the /ɲ/ column laminal. /f w j/ are found in Malay loan words. In a practical orthography developed for writing the language, implosives are written ⟨b' d' j' g'⟩, the affricates ⟨bh dh⟩ (the dh is slightly retroflex), and the voiced glottal onset as a double vowel. The /ʕ/ is sometimes silent, but contrasts with a glottal stop onset in vowel-initial words within a phrase. Its phonemic status is not clear. It has an "extremely limited distribution", linking noun phrases (/ʔiki/ 'small', /ʔana ʕiki/ 'small child') and clauses (/ʕaa/ 'and', /ʕoo/ 'also').

Vowels are /i u e ə o a/, with /ə/ written ⟨è⟩. Phonetic long vowels and diphthongs are vowel sequences. The penultimate syllable/vowel is stressed. (Every vowel constitutes a syllable.)

/ŋe/ [ŋe] 'this.obj', /neʔe/ [ˈneʔe] 'this', /ŋaŋee/ [ŋaˈŋeː] 'thinking', /ŋali/ [ˈŋali] 'senile', /ŋəlu/ [ˈŋəlːu] 'wind'.

A stressed schwa lengthens the following consonant: /meda/ [ˈmeda] 'yesterday', /məda/ [ˈmədːa] 'night'.

Syllables are consonant-vowel or vowel-only.

f, q, v, w, x, y and z are only used in loanwords and foreign names.

== Grammar ==
Dhao has a nominative–accusative subject–verb–object word order, unlike Hawu. Within noun phrases, modifiers follow the noun. There are a set of independent pronouns, and also a set of pronominal clitics.

Personal pronouns
Pronoun	Independent	Clitic
I	ja’a	ku
thou	èu	mu
s/he	nèngu	na (ne)
we (inclusive)	èdhi	ti
we (exclusive)	ji’i	nga
y'all	miu	mi
they	rèngu	ra (si)

When the clitics are used for objects, there are proximal forms in the third person, ne 'this one' and si 'these', the latter also for collective plurals. When used for subjects and the verb begins with a vowel, they drop their vowel with a few irregularities: keʔa meʔa neʔa teʔa ŋeʔa meʔa reʔa 'to know'. Many words that translate prepositions in English are verbs in Dhao, and inflect as such. Dhao also has a single 'intradirective' verb, laʔ 'to go', in which the clitics follow: laku lamu laʔa or laʔe lati (na) lami lasi.

Demonstratives distinguish proximal (here, now, this), distal (there, then, that), and remote (yonder, yon).

Demonstratives
Demonstrative	Singular	Plural
Proximal	ne'e, ne	se'e, se
Distal	èèna, na	sèra, sa
Remote	nèi, ni	sèi, si

Sample clauses (Grimes (2006)).

Lazarus kako maɖʐutu nebβe ɖʐasi.
(name) walk follow shore sea
'Lazarus walked/was walking along the edge of the sea.'

həia ra kako taruu asa Baʔa.
then they walk cont. PATH Ba’a
'Then they continued walking/traveling towards Ba’a.'

ropa ra poro r-are kətu na,
when they cut they-PFV head he/his
'When they had cut off his head,'

{te ŋaa} ra pa-maɖʐe ne.
but they CAUS-die this.one
'But they killed him.'

laɖʐe ama na maɖʐe,
if/when father he/his die
'When his father dies,'

na əra titu kəna.
he strong very much
'He was incredibly strong.'
