= Rote Island =

Island of Indonesia

Coordinates: 10°45′S 123°08′E

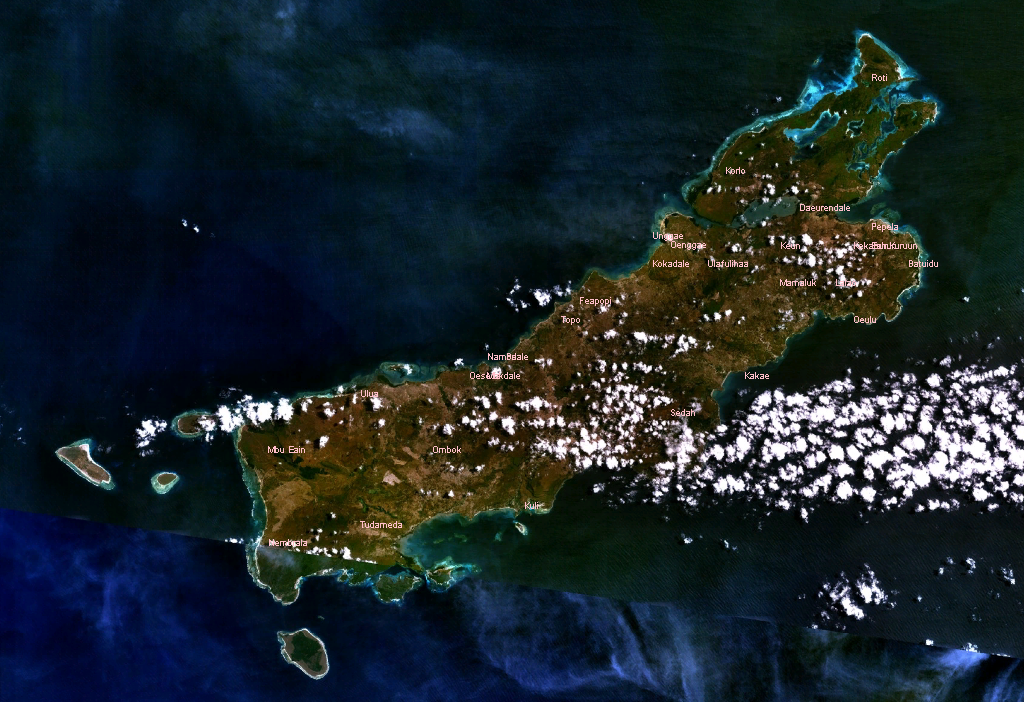
- Satellite photo of Rote.

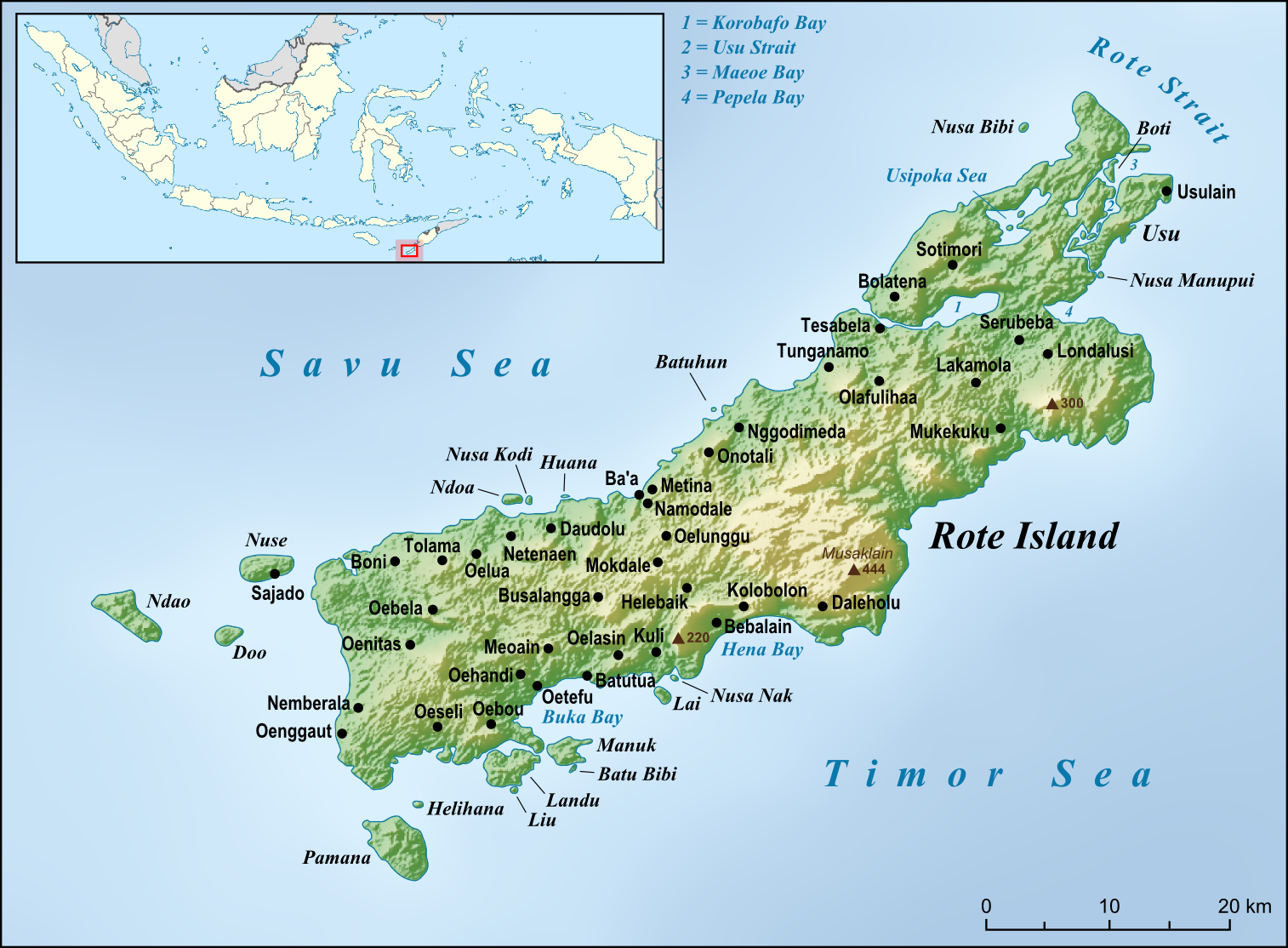
- Map of Rote.

Geography
- Location: Southeast Asia

Administration
- Indonesia
- Province: East Nusa Tenggara
- Regency: Rote Ndao

Additional information
- Time zone: Indonesia Central Standard Time (UTC+08:00)

Rote Island (Indonesian: Pulau Rote, also called Roti) is an island of Indonesia, part of the East Nusa Tenggara province of the Lesser Sunda Islands. According to legend, this island got its name accidentally when a lost Portuguese sailor arrived and asked a farmer where he was. The surprised farmer, who could not speak Portuguese, introduced himself, "Rote". About 80% of the people of Rote Island in Indonesia are Christian. Christianity is an important part of the community.

== Geography ==
Rote lies 500 km (310.686 miles) northwest of the Australian coast and 150 km (105.633 miles) north of the Ashmore and Cartier Islands. The island is situated to the southwest of the larger island of Timor. To the north is the Savu Sea, and to the south is the Timor Sea. To the west lie Savu and Sumba. The uninhabited Pamana (or Ndana) island, just south of Rote, with an area of 14 km^{2} (5 sq mi), is the southernmost island of Indonesia. Along with some other nearby small islands, such as Nuse Island and Ndao island to the west of Rote, it forms the kabupaten (regency) of Rote Ndao Regency, which in the 2020 decennial census recorded a population of 143,764; the official estimate as at mid 2022 was 148,811. Rote island has an area of 1,280.10 km^{2} (494 sq mi) (including offshore islands).

The main town, Ba'a, is located on the northern side of the island. Rote has a good surf area in the south, around the village of Nembrala.

For the most part, the island is covered by grassland and palms. This island experiences tropical savanna climate (Aw) with dry months for much of the year because of the dry winds that blow from mainland Australia. The main rainfall usually occurs between November and March. Between 80% and 95% of all rain falls during the wet west monsoon period and with little or no rain falling between July and October. The mean rainfall for Rote Island is around 1,200 to 1,300 mm annually. During the dry season, many streams and rivers run dry and local inhabitants must rely only on wells for their water supplies.

== Geology ==
Rote is the youngest island of the Banda Fore Arc. The Banda Fore Arc is an accretionary wedge forming in response to an arc continent collision between oceanic crust of the Eurasian Plate and the Australian Plate. As the Australian continental shelf subducts under the Banda Arc, marine sediment is transferred to the upper plate, forming and accretionary wedge. Most of the wedge is submarine, but some parts are exposed above sea level forming the islands of Sumba, Savu, Rote and Timor.

Rote and Savu are the youngest of these islands. Researchers have investigated the biostratigraphy of microfossils to time the uplift of these islands and the rate at which they rose from below sea level. Planktonic microorganisms called Foraminifera build shells of calcite. When they die, their shells accumulate on the seafloor as thick sequences of chalk. Chalk forms in deep marine, low energy environments. The Neogene Batu Putih Formation is a deposit of chalk, 100s of meters thick, that accumulated on top of the Banda Fore Arc accretionary wedge. This chalk is exposed at the surface on Rote and Savu.

By studying the faunal succession and thickness of chalk deposits, researchers have determined that the accretionary wedge began forming at least 5.6 million years ago. Rote rose to the surface around 200,000 years ago, half a million years after nearby Savu, from a depth of at least 2.5 km below sea level, at an average rate of 0.6 mm/year over the past 5.2 million years. Over the last 125,000 years that rate has increased to almost 1.4 mm/year. Changes in the rates in uplift is hypothesized to be a consequence of the subduction of the Scott Plateau of the Australian passive margin. More work is needed to understand the crustal and tectonic mechanisms that are at play in the development of the Rote and Savu islands.

== Transportation ==
There is a daily ferry to the island from Kupang, the provincial capital on West Timor, which provides transport for local passengers and goods as well as tourists. The trip between Kupang and Ba'a takes around two hours. The ferry leaves at 8.30 AM and costs 80,000 Indonesian rupiah. The fare in 2023 had risen to 202,000 IDR.

Wings Air operates daily flights between Rote's David Constantijn Saudale Airport and Kupang's El Tari International Airport. Flight time is about 30 minutes.

== Economy ==
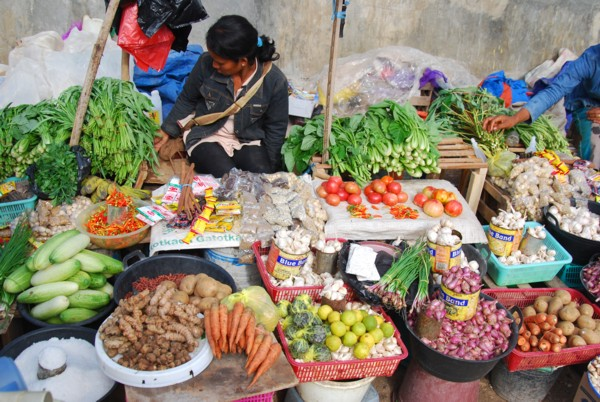
Town Market in Ba'a, Rote

Rote consists of rolling hills, terraced plantations, acacia palm, savanna and some forests. The Rotinese depend, like the Sabunese, on the lontar palm not only for basic survival but also as a supplement to their income from fishing and jewelry making.

Agriculture is the main form of employment. Fishing is also important, especially in the eastern village of Papela (east of Londalusi in the map), which has led to disputes with Australia over the water between them.

== Tourist attractions ==
Rote has many historical relics including fine antique Chinese porcelain, as well as ancient arts and traditions. Several prominent Indonesian figures were born in Rote. A popular music instrument, Sasando, is made of palm leaves.

In the eastern part of the island is a pond in Landu Village that has non-poisonous jellyfish. The pond also has a white sandy beach.

Rote Island, also known as Rote Ndao, is an island consisting of 96 small islands and 6 of them are inhabited. Many islands have natural beaches and other natural and frequent tourism, but so far only local tourists often come to Rote. Ten of the most famous tourist attractions in Rote are Bo'a beach, Nemberala beach, Lutu Babatu beach, Falii water located in West Rote, Oesosole beach in East Rote, Termanu stone in central Rote, Laguna Nirwana in Southwest Rote, Oekode Waterfall, Zero Point Rote and Inaoe beach in South Rote.

== Culture ==
The ti'i langga is a traditional hat with a horn-like protrusion at the top that is a symbol of Rote cultural identity.

There are many languages spoken on the island, all related to the languages on nearby Timor island. These languages are: Bilba, Dengka, Lole, Ringgou, Dela-Oenale, Termanu, and Tii.

== Trivia ==
The Critically Endangered Rote Island snake-necked turtle is endemic to Rote Island. Other native fauna include the Black cuckoo-dove, the Timor green pigeon, the Timor Yellow-crested cockatoo, and Trimeresurus insularis "the blue pit viper", and the Rote myzomela.

The US-born Australian scholar, James J. Fox, has written extensively about Rotinese culture.

== Gallery ==
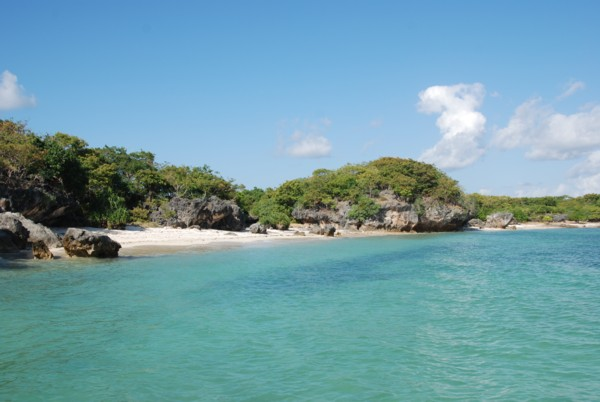
The Beach on Nusa Manuk (Manuk Island), Southwest Rote

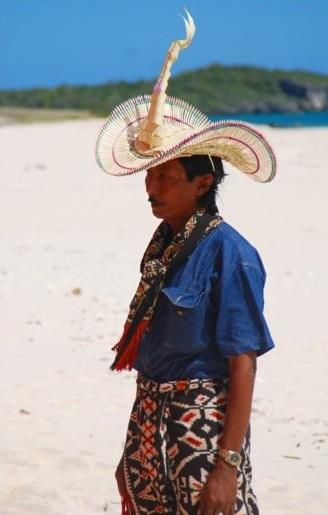
A Raja (traditional king) of Rote wearing the ti'i langga

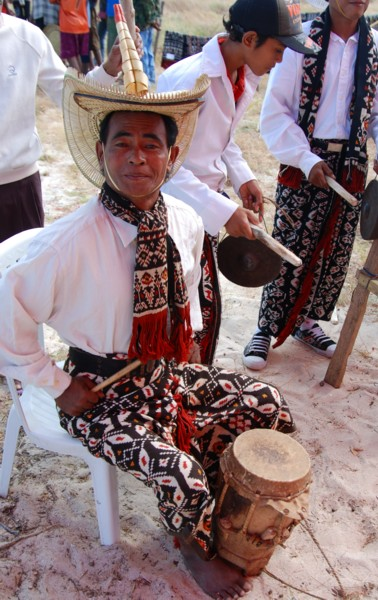
A Rotenese drummer with traditional hat

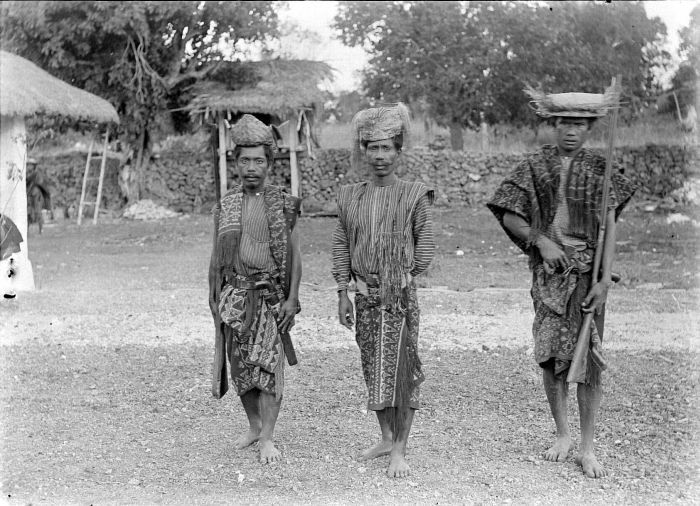
Korbafo chief with warriors, 1900

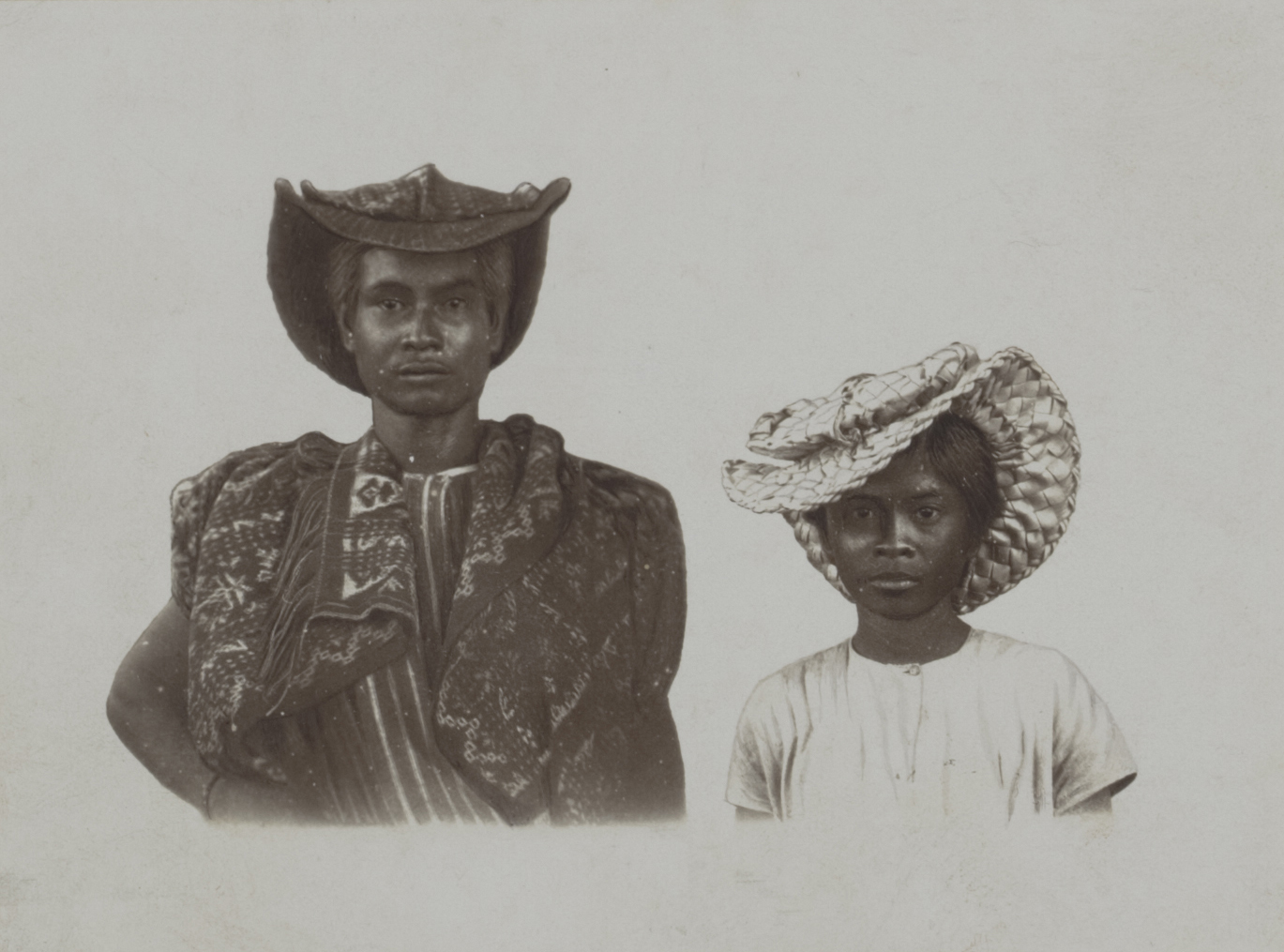
Two Rotenese (Koa Fola dan Besi Fola, 1812–1816)

== See also ==
- List of islands of Indonesia
- Rotenese languages
