= Ndao Island =

Island in Indonesia

Ndao
Indonesian: Pulau Ndao, Rai Dhao Nickname: Rai Kahore
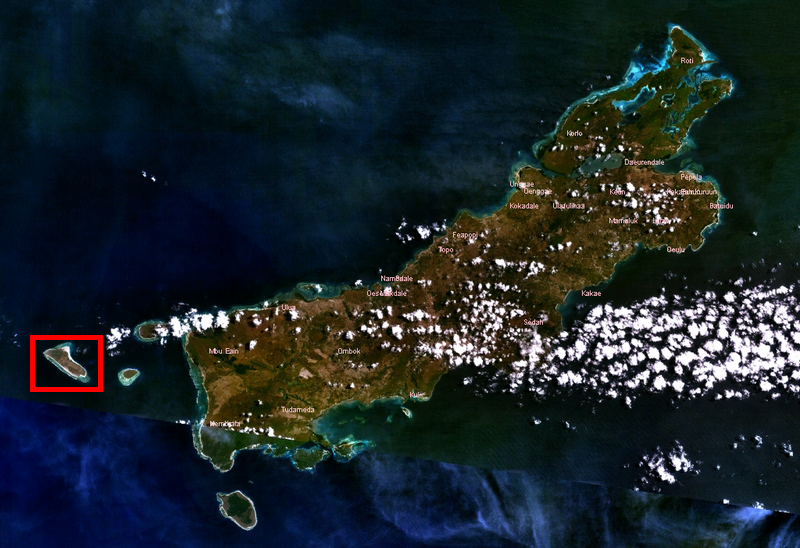
- Satellite view of Ndao Island
- Interactive map of Ndao

Geography
- Location: Timor Sea
- Coordinates: 10°49′S 122°40′E
- Archipelago: Lesser Sunda Islands (Rote Islands)
- Area: 8.5236 km^{2} (3.2910 sq mi)

Administration
- Indonesia
- Province: East Nusa Tenggara
- Regency: Rote Ndao

Demographics
- Population: 3,963
- Ethnic groups: Dhao

Additional information
- Time zone: Indonesia Central Standard Time (UTC+08:00)

Ndao is one of the southernmost islands of the Indonesian archipelago. It is part of Lesser Sunda Islands and is located west of the island of Rote Island, 500 km (310 mi) from the coast Australia and 170 km (110 mi) from the Ashmore and Cartier Islands.

Administratively, Ndao forms, together with Rote and neighboring islands, the Rote Ndao Regency after the regency was separated from Kupang province.

== Tourism ==
Ndao has some areas that are popular for surfing.
