= Savu =

Island in Indonesia

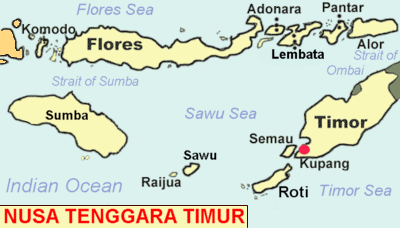
- Map of the islands of East Nusa Tenggara, including Savu.
- Interactive map of Savu

Geography
- Location: South East Asia
- Coordinates: 10°29′S 121°54′E
- Archipelago: Savu Islands, Lesser Sunda Islands
- Area: 421.42 km^{2} (162.71 sq mi)
- Highest point: 366

Administration
- Indonesia
- Province: East Nusa Tenggara
- Regency: Sabu Raijua

Demographics
- Population: 80,377 (2020 Census)
- Pop. density: 191/km^{2} (495/sq mi)

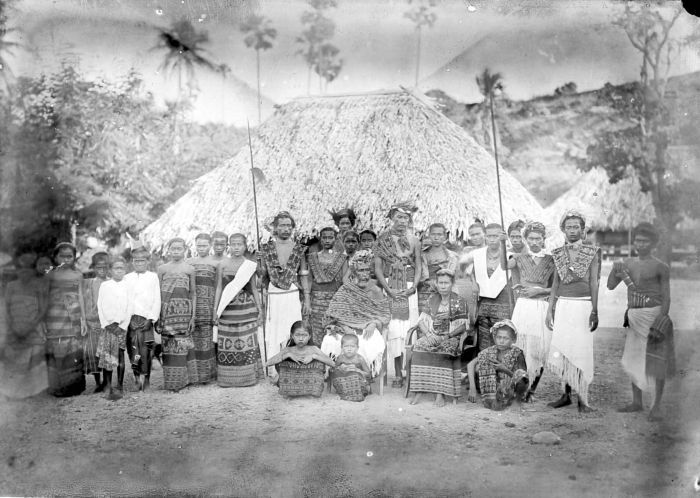
The Raja of Liae and his courtiers; ca 1900

Savu (Indonesian: Sawu, also known as Sabu, Havu, and Hawu) is the largest of a group of three islands, situated midway between Sumba and Rote, west of Timor, in Indonesia's eastern province, East Nusa Tenggara. Ferries connect the islands to Waingapu on Sumba, Ende on Flores, and Kupang in West Timor. Flying to Savu through Susi Air from Kupang, Ende, and Waingapu is also possible.

== Geography ==
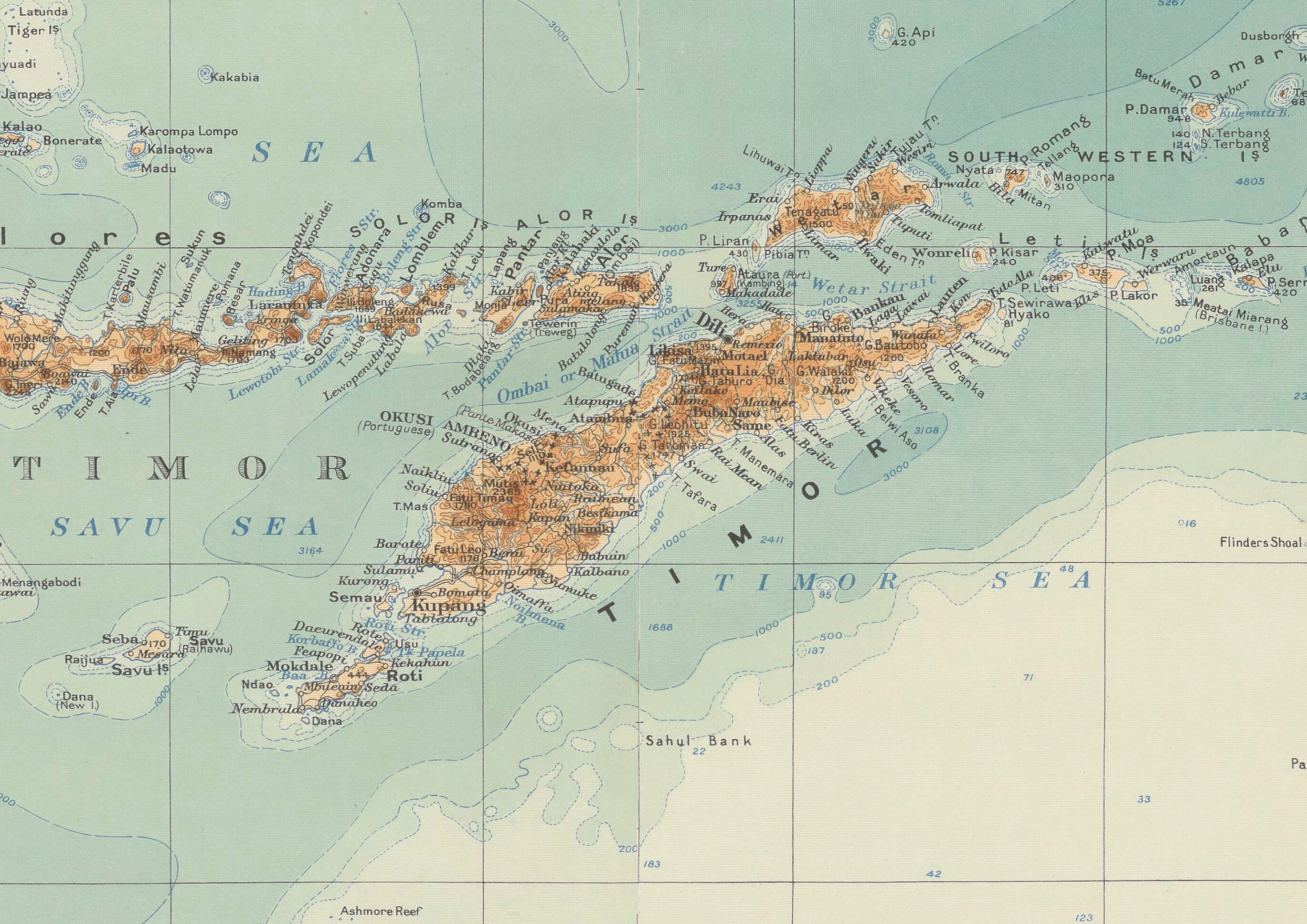
Location of the Sawu Islands southwest of Timor

The Savu Islands (Indonesian: Kepulauan Sawu) include Rai Hawu (or Savu), Rai Jua, and Rai Dana. The three islands are fringed by coral reefs and sandy beaches. Rai Hawu is the principal island. Rai Jua is a smaller island west of Rai Hawu. Rai Dana is a small, uninhabited island, situated 30 km southwest of Rai Jua. From April to October, deep ocean swells pound the southern coastlines.

The land is covered for the most part by grassland and palms. The climate of this island is tropical savanna (Aw) with dry months for much of the year because of the dry winds which blow from Australia. The main rains usually fall between November and March. Between 82% and 94% of all rain falls during the west monsoon and with little or no rain falling between August and October. The mean annual rainfall for Savu Island is 1,019 mm. During the dry season, many streams run dry and local inhabitants must depend on wells for their water supplies.

== Vulcanism ==
The Savu Islands are situated in a tectonic subduction zone, where the Indo-Australian Plate is moving northward, sliding under the Eurasian Plate. The islands lie on a ridge that was created by volcanic eruptions caused by the plate movement. Sediments carried into the Earth's crust heat up and rise in plumes of magma, which cool and solidify to form igneous rock. The Sumba Ridge is no longer volcanically active, but active volcanoes are on the island of Flores, to the north. The compression of the two tectonic plates is causing the Savu Islands to rise at a rate of about 1 mm per year. Occasionally, however, the tectonic plate suddenly slips a much greater distance, resulting in an earthquake. The 8.3 M_{w} Sumba earthquake struck 280 km west-southwest of Rai Jua in August 1977. The shock triggered a destructive tsunami which swept across the coastal plain at Seba, reaching as high as the airport. No one was reported missing on Savu or Rai Jua. However, on the neighbouring islands of Sumba and Sumbawa, the death toll reached 180.Interactive map showing major earthquakes in East Nusa Tenggara between 1970 and 2005 (requires Flash Player)

== Society ==
The population was 89,327 at the 2020 Census, and the official estimate as at mid 2024 was 94,787. Savu society still performs traditional animistic beliefs, known as Djingi Tiu. Dutch missionaries introduced Protestantism which remains on the islands today. The Savu people also inhabit the southeastern end of Sumba Island.

The Savunese have a traditional greeting, done by pressing one's nose (at the same time) to another person's nose at an encounter. It is used in all meetings among Savu's people and on major ceremonies, and serves a similar purpose to a formal handshake in modern western culture, and indeed is often used in conjunction with one, similar to the Hongi in New Zealand.

== Administration ==
The group of three islands was formed (in 2008) into the Sabu Raijua Regency within East Nusa Tenggara province.

== Agriculture ==
Savunese culture is ecologically fitting for such an arid environment. The traditional clan agreements on land control and water distribution ensure that the land is carefully managed and not overexploited. Their gardens form a well structured ecology, emulating a tropical forest with diverse species of trees and shade plants.

Agricultural production on Savu includes corn, rice, roots, beans, livestock (meat/milk), and seaweed, which was introduced by Japanese interests, in the early 1990s. Pigs, goats, and chickens are commonplace in the villages. Those farmers who depend on mixed-crop gardens or on mung bean fields are generally better able to manage during times of poor rain, but are seemingly less successful when the rains are good. Corn, as a single crop, remains the predominant staple on Savu, though most farmers try to plant several different fields to increase their chances of at least one successful harvest. Cotton is the main crop on Rai Jua, where the standard of living is below that of Savu. It is used to make traditional textiles. Corn is planted in late November, December, or early January and harvested from February through March; rice and mung beans are planted later, usually in January, after soils are well saturated with rain. In El Niño years, farmers are frequently misled by initial rains, which offer promise, but then cease. Most farmers keep some seed reserves if they are forced to plant a second time during the wet season. Rarely do farmers have sufficient seed reserves for a third attempt at planting, and by the time such a third planting seems necessary, little likelihood of success remains. By mid-March, the rains begin to diminish and planting corn with any expectation of a good harvest is no longer possible.

Prior to the corn harvest, the poorer segments of the population survive on reserve foods, primarily cassava, some sweet potato, forest yams, and sugar supplies from tapping lontar palms. This period is known as the time of "ordinary hunger". However, during periods of drought, when the planting and subsequent harvest of the corn crop is delayed, the period of ordinary hunger is extended and "ordinary hunger" becomes "extraordinary hunger". Most families manage on one meager meal a day. Livestock, suffering from the same conditions as the human population, are consumed or sold to buy emergency foods. People turn to green papaya, eaten as a vegetable, and tamarind seeds. In the dry season, drinking water becomes difficult to obtain and is often polluted by animals seeking water. Women and younger girls spend more time than ever carrying water for their families. A strong indicator of the "extraordinary hunger" period is a sharp increase in gastrointestinal diseases. Children are particularly vulnerable.

== Sawu Marine National Park ==
According to Minister of Maritime Affairs and Fisheries Decision Letter (Surat Keputusan Menteri Kelautan dan Perikanan) No. 38 of 2009 dated 18 May 2009, Marine National Park (MMAF) Laut Sawu is established with MPA Code: 75 and Area Wide: 3,521,130.01 hectares which consists of: 567.170 hectares Marines of Sumba Regency, West Sumba Regency, Central Sumba Regency, Southwest Sumba Regency, Manggarai Regency, West Manggarai Regency and Marine areas of Timor-Rote-Sabu-Batek with 2,95 million hectares in East Sumba Regency, Rote Ndao Regency, Kupang Regency, South Central Timor Regency and City of Kupang.

In this park are 63,339,32 hectares coral reefs with 500 species of corals, 5,019.53 ha of mangroves, 5,320.62 ha of sea grass beds, and 1,769.1 ha of estuaries. Five of six turtle species in the world also can be found in Savu Sea ecosystem, as well as 30 species of marine mammals (whales and dolphins), including the endangered sperm whale and blue whale, which are easy to find in the area and are pelagic and demersal species.

== Early European contact ==
Initial contact was with the Dutch Vereenigde Oost-Indische Companie in 1648. References to Savu from the period invariably concern Savunese soldiers, mercenaries, or slaves. In 1674, the crew of a Dutch sloop was massacred in East Savu, after their vessel ran aground. The Dutch responded by forming an alliance with the raja of Seba, so troops could be sent in to retaliate. However, they failed to enter the fortress of Hurati, in B'olou Village of Eastern Savu, as it was ringed by three defensive walls. To save face, the Dutch force accepted payment in the form of slaves, gold, and beads.

In 1770, Captain James Cook visited Savu, staying three days before continuing on to Batavia. It was the first European voyage to have scientists on board. During the three-year expedition, botanists Joseph Banks and Daniel Solander collected over 3,500 plant species along with specimens of animals, minerals, and ethnographic materials that on their return fascinated Europeans. Cook's visit to Savu was brief, and though Banks and he produced detailed records of the island and its people, their accounts were based for the most part on information provided by Mr Lange, the German representative of the Dutch East India Company, who was stationed on Savu at the time.

== Climate ==
Climate data for Savu (1991–2020 normals, extremes 2007–2023)
Month	Jan	Feb	Mar	Apr	May	Jun	Jul	Aug	Sep	Oct	Nov	Dec	Year
Record high °C (°F)	35.8 (96.4)	34.2 (93.6)	34.8 (94.6)	35.2 (95.4)	34.4 (93.9)	34.2 (93.6)	33.2 (91.8)	34.4 (93.9)	35.5 (95.9)	35.6 (96.1)	36.8 (98.2)	35.4 (95.7)	36.8 (98.2)
Mean daily maximum °C (°F)	31.5 (88.7)	31.5 (88.7)	32.1 (89.8)	32.4 (90.3)	32.1 (89.8)	30.9 (87.6)	30.7 (87.3)	31.1 (88.0)	32.3 (90.1)	33.3 (91.9)	33.8 (92.8)	32.3 (90.1)	32.0 (89.6)
Daily mean °C (°F)	28.7 (83.7)	28.5 (83.3)	28.5 (83.3)	28.8 (83.8)	28.5 (83.3)	27.5 (81.5)	26.9 (80.4)	26.9 (80.4)	27.9 (82.2)	29.3 (84.7)	30.1 (86.2)	29.1 (84.4)	28.4 (83.1)
Mean daily minimum °C (°F)	25.5 (77.9)	25.3 (77.5)	25.0 (77.0)	25.3 (77.5)	25.1 (77.2)	24.5 (76.1)	23.8 (74.8)	23.3 (73.9)	23.8 (74.8)	24.9 (76.8)	25.8 (78.4)	25.6 (78.1)	24.8 (76.7)
Record low °C (°F)	21.6 (70.9)	20.8 (69.4)	20.0 (68.0)	21.8 (71.2)	19.8 (67.6)	18.0 (64.4)	17.4 (63.3)	17.0 (62.6)	19.8 (67.6)	21.7 (71.1)	21.2 (70.2)	20.8 (69.4)	17.0 (62.6)
Average precipitation mm (inches)	239.1 (9.41)	191.4 (7.54)	173.9 (6.85)	72.3 (2.85)	29.5 (1.16)	17.7 (0.70)	4.5 (0.18)	1.8 (0.07)	4.4 (0.17)	17.1 (0.67)	63.5 (2.50)	269.6 (10.61)	1,084.8 (42.71)
Average precipitation days (≥ 1.0 mm)	15.6	12.8	13.3	6.0	3.1	1.3	0.9	0.4	0.5	1.6	5.1	14.4	75
Source: Starlings Roost Weather
