= Batik Air =

Full-service airline of Indonesia

PT Batik Air Indonesia

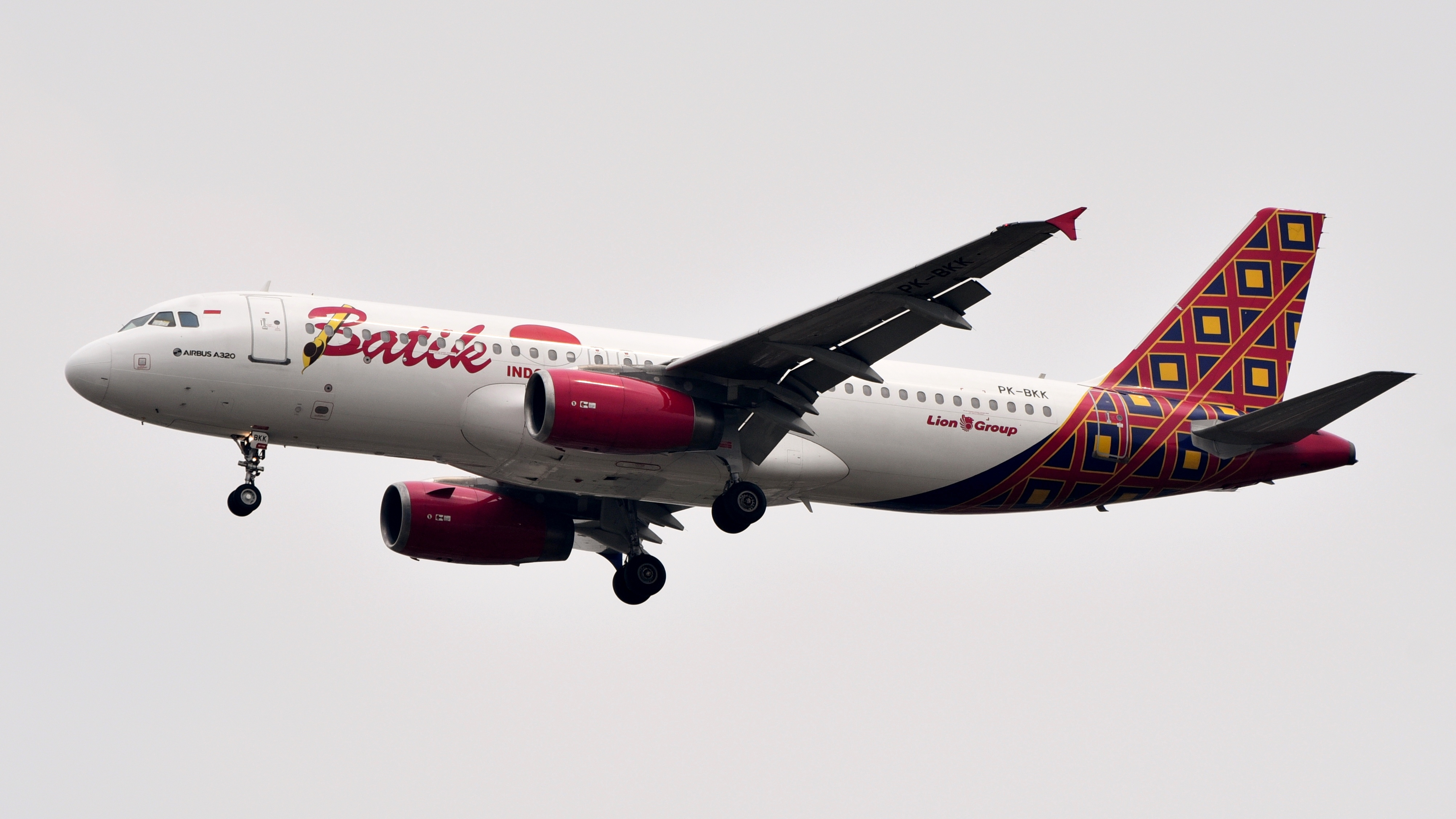
- A Batik Air Airbus A320-200
IATA	ICAO	Call sign
ID	BTK	BATIK
- Founded: 10 June 2012; 14 years ago
- Commenced operations: 3 May 2013; 13 years ago
- Hubs: Jakarta–Soekarno-Hatta; Makassar
- Secondary hubs: Jakarta–Halim Perdanakusuma; Denpasar; Surabaya
- Frequent-flyer program: Batik Air Club
- Fleet size: 61
- Destinations: 49
- Parent company: Lion Air Group
- Headquarters: Jakarta, Indonesia
- Key people: Wisnu Wijayanto (CEO)
- Website: www.batikair.com

Batik Air is an Indonesian scheduled airline headquartered at Soekarno–Hatta International Airport in Jakarta. Established in 2012 as the full-service division of the Lion Air Group, Batik Air conducted its inaugural flight on May 3, 2013, connecting Jakarta with Manado and Yogyakarta. The airline offers premium services and has been recognized as a 3-Star Airline by Skytrax.

Batik Air shares its branding and full-service model with its sister airline, Batik Air Malaysia. Both airlines operate under the Lion Air Group, providing coordinated services and shared operational standards to enhance connectivity across Southeast Asia and beyond.

== History ==
=== Founding ===
On November 18, 2011, Lion Air announced its intentions to enter the full service market with the announcement of a premium subsidiary by the name of Space Jet; the airline was to be a full-service subsidiary to compete with the Indonesian flag carrier, Garuda Indonesia, which at the time was the only operating full service carrier (monopoly) serving the Indonesian market.

In June 2012, Batik Air was established, following a rename from Space Jet. The announcement was followed by a commitment by the Lion Air Group for five Boeing 787 Dreamliners to be allocated to Batik, intending to have them delivered by 2015.

The airline began operations on May 3, 2013 using Boeing 737-900ERs leased from Lion Air, and at that point became the country's third full service carrier after Garuda Indonesia and the short-lived Pacific Royale Airways. Batik Air's 737-900ERs were equipped with a two-class seating configuration, replacing Lion Air's two-class 737-900ER service. The new service offered passengers a personal television (in-flight entertainment system) in every seat, light snacks and free meals, and seat pitches of 32 inches (81 cm) in economy class and 45 inches (114 cm) in business class, as well as free baggage allowances.

In 2014, Lion Air Group cancelled the Boeing 787 deal with Boeing and indefinitely shelved plans for the long-haul expansion of Batik Air, citing the airline's inclusion in the European Union airline blacklist at the time. In June 2016, the airline was removed from the EU Blacklist, together with its parent Lion Air.

=== Expansion ===
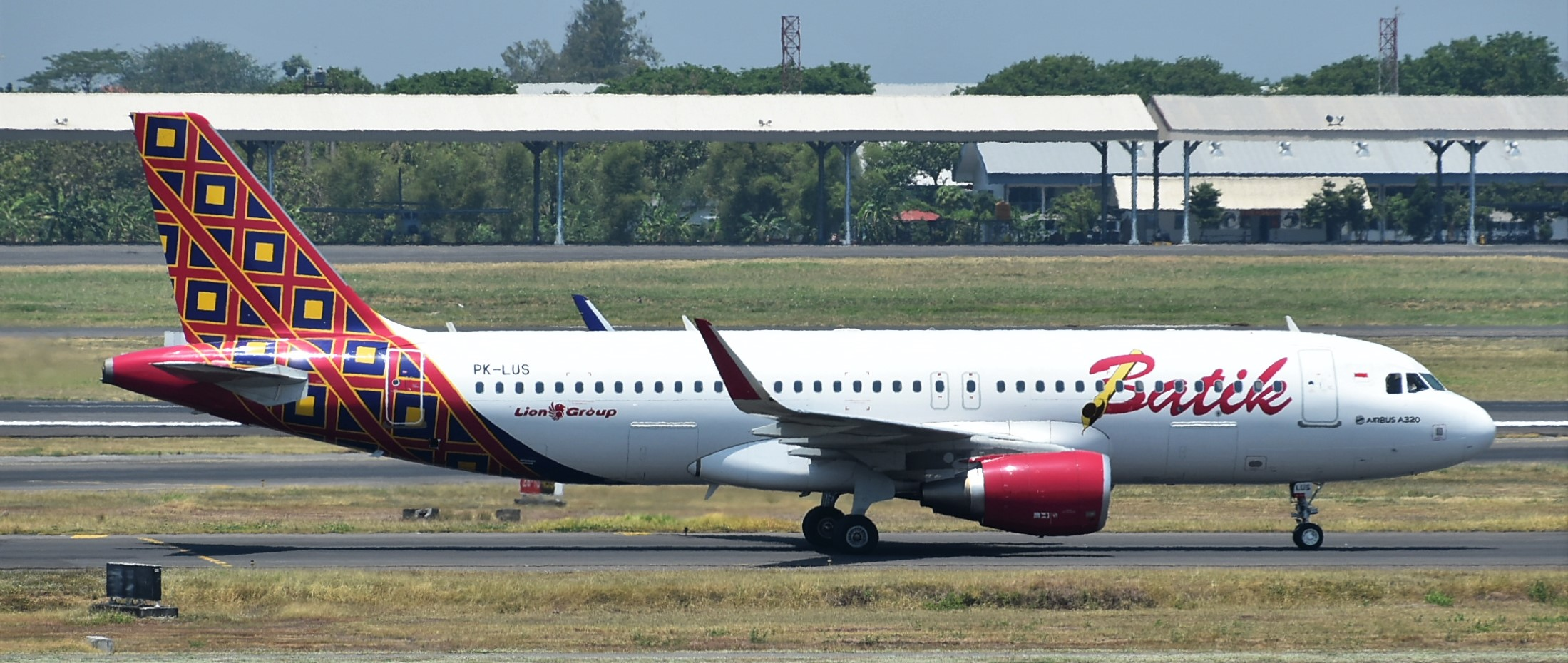
An Airbus A320 at Juanda International Airport, Surabaya, Indonesia

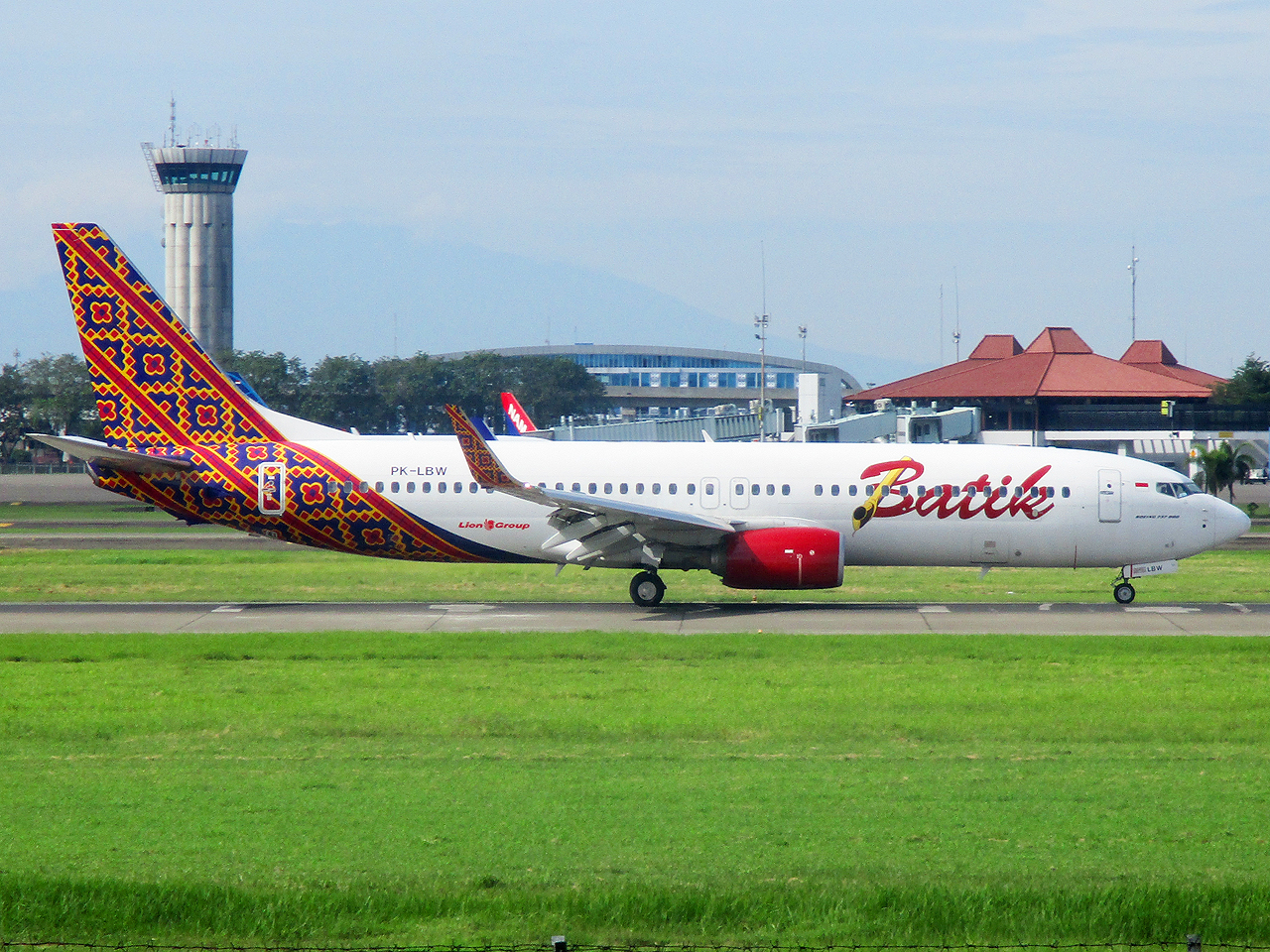
A Boeing 737-800 at Soekarno-Hatta International Airport, Jakarta, Indonesia

In November 2019, Batik Air received its first wide-body aircraft, a single Airbus A330-300, transferred from Thai Lion Air. The airline announced its intention to use the aircraft to fly to Saudi Arabia, carrying umrah passengers to Jeddah and Medina, complementing Lion Air's existing service. Medina later became the airline's first long haul route when it launched flights from Surabaya carrying hajj pilgrims on December 17 of that year. In February 2020, the aircraft was used to repatriate Indonesian nationals from Wuhan, China during the early stages of the COVID-19 pandemic. Controversy arose in which members of the People's Representative Council questioned the decision to have Batik Air operate the repatriation flight in place of the state-owned Garuda Indonesia; the Indonesian Ministry of Transportation later issued a statement justifying the choice, citing Batik's existing permit to fly to Wuhan.

On 27 April 2022, Lion Air Group's Malaysian full service subsidiary, Malindo Air, rebranded as Batik Air Malaysia, adopting a common identity with the existing Batik Air. The then-CEO of Batik Air (Indonesia), Capt. Achmad Luftie, announced that Batik Air Malaysia would function as an international complement to the Indonesian arm, using Kuala Lumpur as a transit point beyond South East Asia for Batik Air passengers. In May 2022, the airline announced plans to expand its international network from Ngurah Rai International Airport in Bali.

In December 2022, Batik Air, along with the other Lion Air Group airlines, relocated its main base to Terminal 2 at Soekarno Hatta International Airport, consolidating the operation of the entire group at the terminal. Per the same year, Batik Air, together with Lion Air, is reported to have a combined market share of 44% out of Soekarno Hatta International Airport, in terms of seat capacity and flight frequencies.

In February 2023, the airline was ranked fourth out of the seven airlines that were included in a survey of Indonesian people listing their favorite airlines conducted by Jakpat.

== Destinations ==
As of August 2025, Batik Air operates 44 domestic and international destinations, with a frequency of over 350 flights daily. International destinations included Singapore, Bangkok, Kuala Lumpur, and Penang, as well as Canberra, Chennai, Perth. The airline also operates charters to Guilin, Nanning, Kunming and Shenzhen in China.

The airline chiefly focuses on operating within the Indonesian domestic market, which makes up of 90% of its scheduled capacity.

Country	City	Airport	Note	Ref
Australia	Adelaide	Adelaide Airport	Terminated	
Australia	Canberra	Canberra Airport	Terminated	
Australia	Melbourne	Melbourne Airport	Terminated	
Australia	Perth	Perth Airport		
Australia	Sydney	Sydney Airport	Terminated	
China	Kunming	Kunming Changshui International Airport		
East Timor	Dili	Presidente Nicolau Lobato International Airport	Terminated	
Hong Kong	Hong Kong	Hong Kong International Airport	Terminated	
India	Chennai	Chennai International Airport	Terminated	
Indonesia	Ambon	Pattimura Airport		
Indonesia	Balikpapan	Sultan Aji Muhammad Sulaiman Sepinggan Airport		
Indonesia	Banda Aceh	Sultan Iskandar Muda International Airport		
Indonesia	Bandar Lampung	Radin Inten II International Airport		
Indonesia	Banjarmasin	Syamsudin Noor International Airport		
Indonesia	Banyuwangi	Banyuwangi Airport		
Indonesia	Batam	Hang Nadim International Airport		
Indonesia	Berau	Kalimarau Airport		
Indonesia	Bengkulu	Fatmawati Soekarno Airport		
Indonesia	Biak	Frans Kaisiepo Airport	Terminated	
Indonesia	Denpasar	Ngurah Rai International Airport	Hub	
Indonesia	Gorontalo	Djalaluddin Airport		
Indonesia	Jakarta	Halim Perdanakusuma International Airport	Hub	
Indonesia	Jakarta	Soekarno–Hatta International Airport	Hub	
Indonesia	Jambi	Sultan Thaha Airport		
Indonesia	Jayapura	Sentani International Airport		
Indonesia	Kediri	Dhoho Airport	Terminated	
Indonesia	Kendari	Haluoleo Airport		
Indonesia	Kupang	El Tari Airport		
Indonesia	Labuan Bajo	Komodo International Airport		
Indonesia	Lubuk Linggau	Silampari Airport		
Indonesia	Luwuk	Syukuran Aminuddin Amir Airport		
Indonesia	Makassar	Sultan Hasanuddin International Airport	Hub	
Indonesia	Malang	Abdul Rachman Saleh Airport		
Indonesia	Mamuju	Tampa Padang Airport	Terminated	
Indonesia	Manado	Sam Ratulangi International Airport		
Indonesia	Manokwari	Rendani Airport		
Indonesia	Mataram	Lombok International Airport		
Indonesia	Medan	Kualanamu International Airport		
Indonesia	Merauke	Mopah Airport	Terminated	
Indonesia	Muara Bungo	Muara Bungo Airport		
Indonesia	Nabire	Douw Aturure Airport		
Indonesia	Padang	Minangkabau International Airport		
Indonesia	Palangkaraya	Tjilik Riwut Airport		
Indonesia	Palembang	Sultan Mahmud Badaruddin II International Airport		
Indonesia	Palu	Mutiara SIS Al-Jufrie Airport		
Indonesia	Pangkal Pinang	Depati Amir Airport	Terminated	
Indonesia	Pangkalan Bun	Iskandar Airport		
Indonesia	Pekanbaru	Sultan Syarif Kasim II International Airport		
Indonesia	Pontianak	Supadio International Airport		
Indonesia	Samarinda	Aji Pangeran Tumenggung Pranoto International Airport		
Indonesia	Semarang	Jenderal Ahmad Yani International Airport		
Indonesia	Siborong-Borong	Raja Sisingamangaraja XII Airport	Terminated	
Indonesia	Sorong	Domine Eduard Osok Airport		
Indonesia	Surabaya	Juanda International Airport	Hub	
Indonesia	Surakarta	Adisoemarmo International Airport		
Indonesia	Tambolaka	Lede Kalumbang Airport		
Indonesia	Tanjung Pandan	H.A.S. Hanandjoeddin International Airport	Terminated	
Indonesia	Tanjung Pinang	Raja Haji Fisabilillah Airport		
Indonesia	Tarakan	Juwata Airport		
Indonesia	Ternate	Sultan Babullah Airport		
Indonesia	Timika	Mozes Kilangin Airport		
Indonesia	Yogyakarta	Adisutjipto Airport	Terminated	
Indonesia	Yogyakarta	Yogyakarta International Airport		
Malaysia	Kuala Lumpur	Kuala Lumpur International Airport		
Malaysia	Penang	Penang International Airport	Terminated	
Saudi Arabia	Jeddah	King Abdulaziz International Airport		
Singapore	Singapore	Changi Airport		
Taiwan	Taipei	Taoyuan International Airport	Terminated	
Thailand	Bangkok	Don Mueang International Airport		

=== Codeshare agreements ===
Batik Air codeshares with the following airlines:

- Batik Air Malaysia
- Emirates

=== Interline agreements ===
- APG Airlines
- Lion Air

== Fleet ==
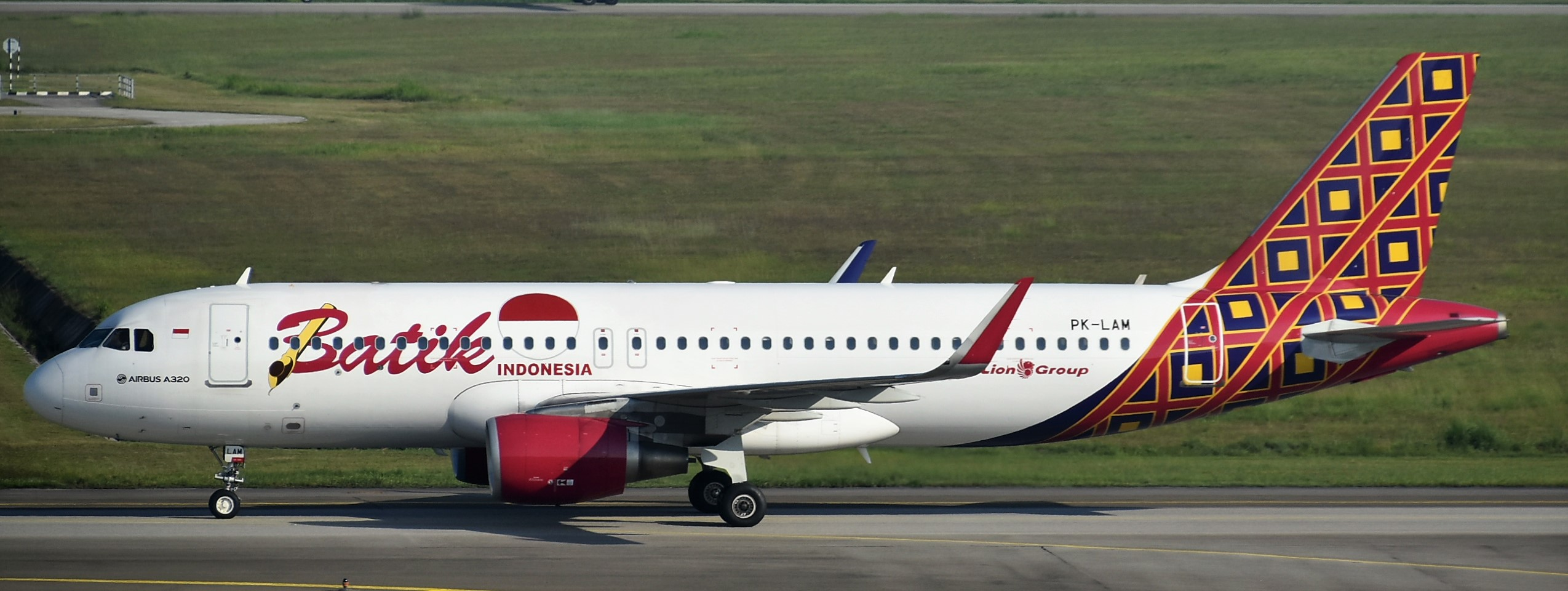
An Airbus A320 at Kuala Lumpur International Airport, Kuala Lumpur, Malaysia

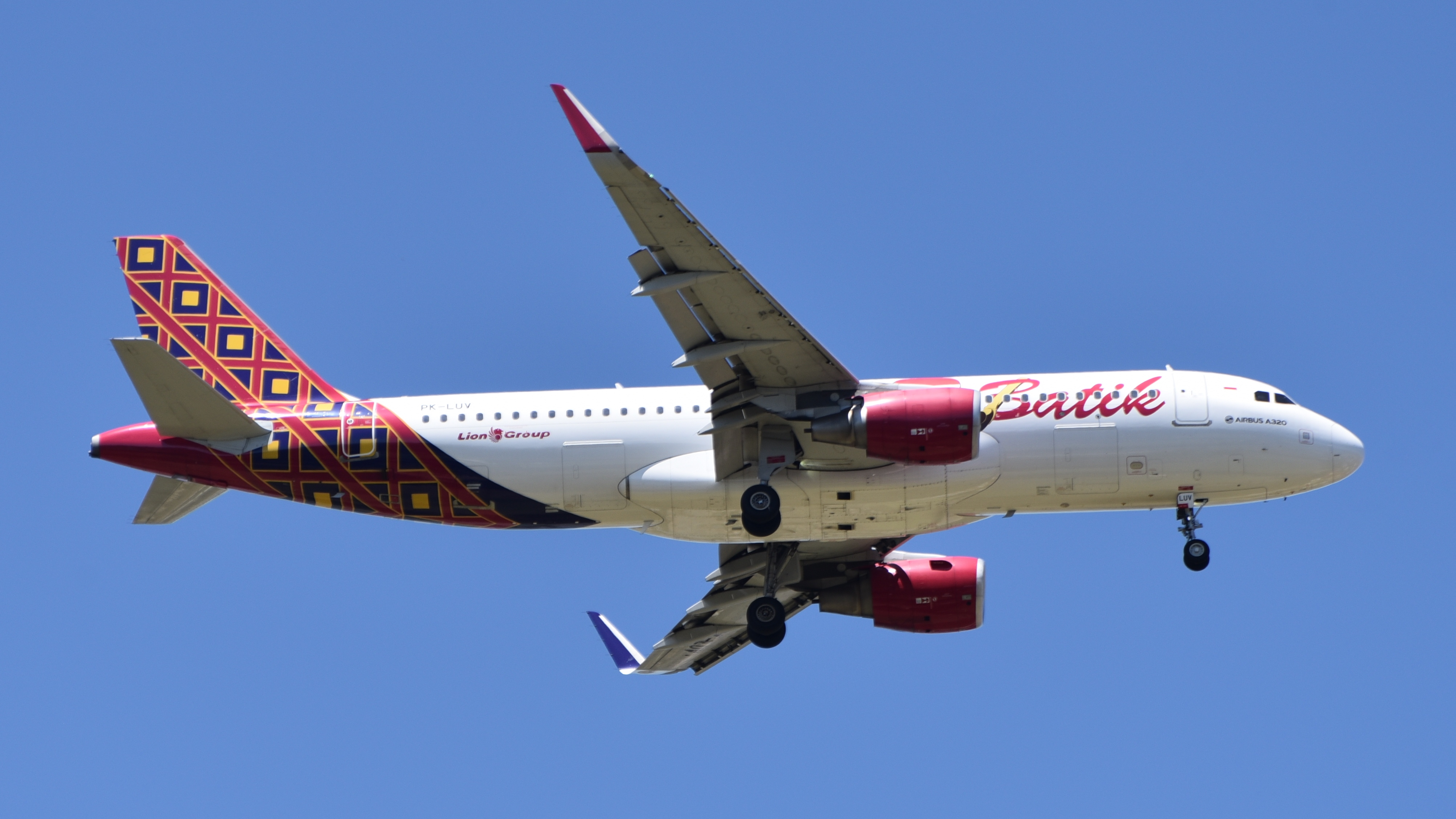
An Airbus A320

An Airbus A320neo at Sultan Aji Muhammad Sulaiman Sepinggan Airport, Balikpapan, Indonesia

=== Current fleet ===
As of July 2026, Batik Air operates the following aircraft:

Batik Air fleet
Aircraft	In Service	Orders	Passengers			Notes
Aircraft	In Service	Orders	C	Y	Total	Notes
Airbus A320-200	47	0	12	144	156	Selected aircraft are equipped with Sharklets.
Airbus A320-200	47	0	12	138	150	Selected aircraft are equipped with Sharklets.
Airbus A320-200	47	0	16	120	136	Selected aircraft are equipped with Sharklets.
Airbus A320-200	47	0	8	156	164	Selected aircraft are equipped with Sharklets.
Airbus A320neo	1	125	12	144	156	PK-BDF
Airbus A321LR	—	65	TBA			
Airbus A330-300	1	—	18	374	392	
Boeing 737-800	12	—	12	150	162	To be transferred to Batik Air Malaysia.
Total	61	190				

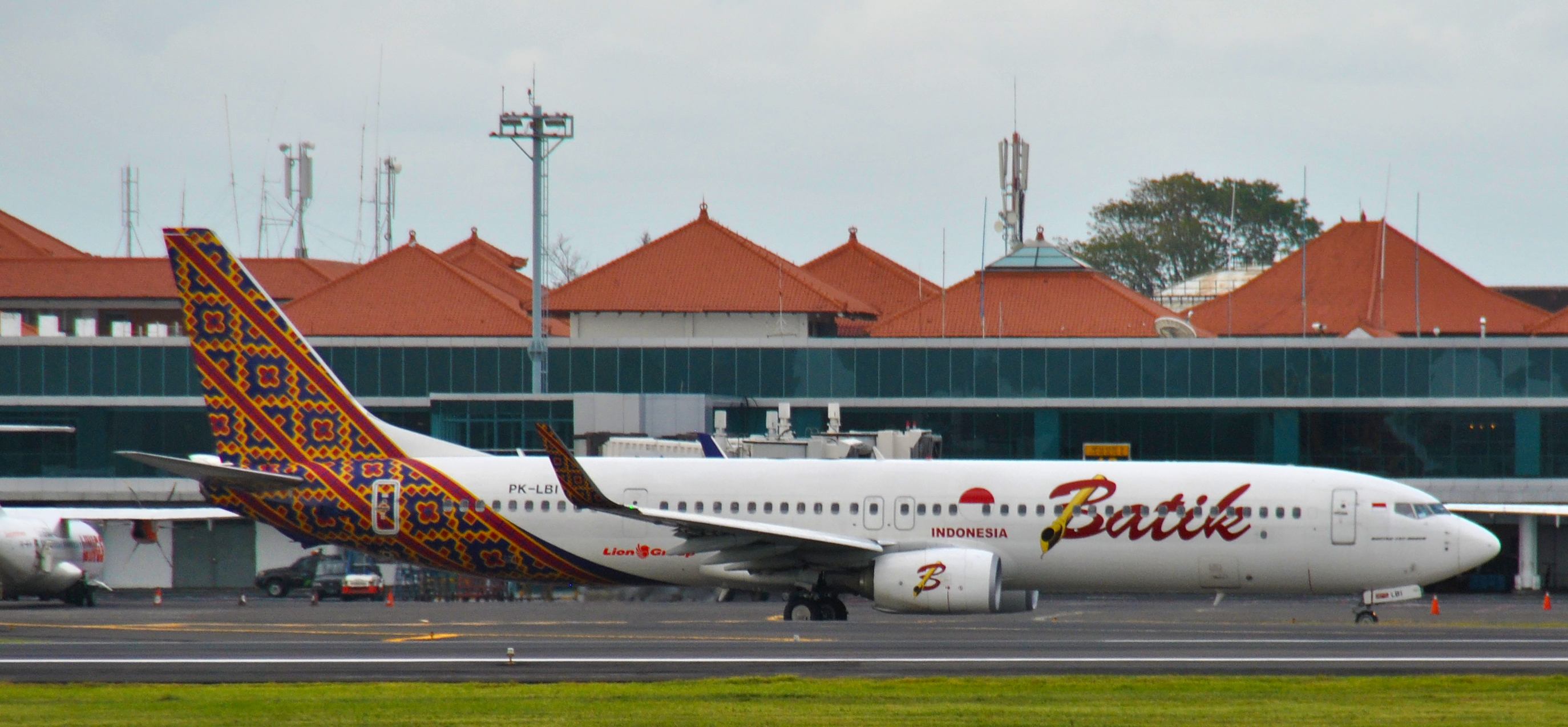
A former Boeing 737-900ER at Ngurah Rai International Airport

== Services ==
Batik Air operates as a full service carrier, featuring two classes of service—business class and economy class—on all flights.

=== Cabins ===
==== Business class ====
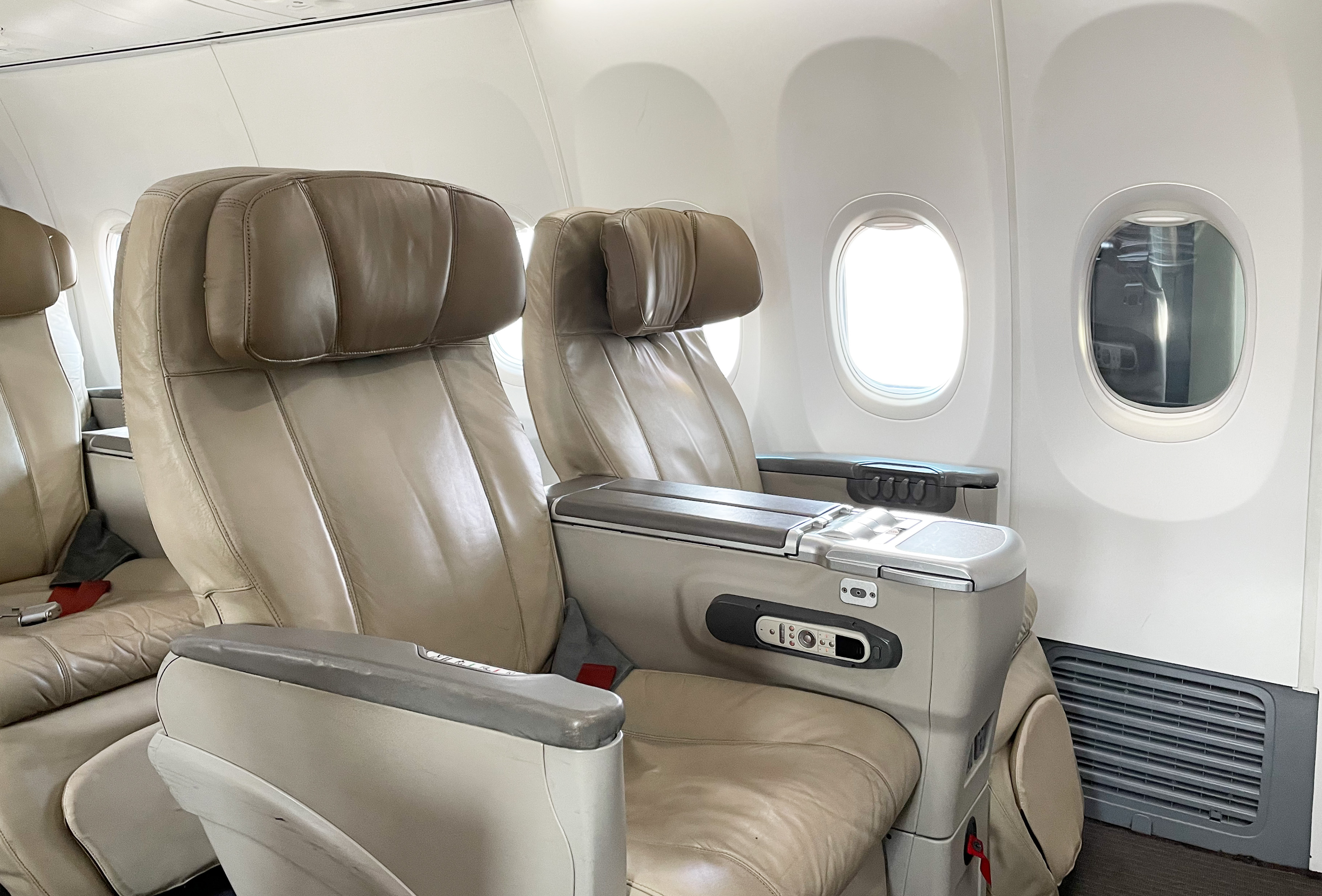
Business class seats on a Batik Air Boeing 737

Business class is available on all Batik Air aircraft. On narrow body aircraft, the business class cabin is equipped with 12 recliner seats in a 2-2 configuration featuring a 38 inch (96.5 cm) pitch, along with charging ports and individual touch screen IFE monitors. On the Airbus A330-300 aircraft, the business class cabin consists of 18 angle-flat seats in a 2-2-2 configuration, each equipped with personal IFE monitors. Meals and refreshments, and amenities including headphones, are provided to all business class passengers. All business class passengers are also offered lounge access at select airports.

==== Economy class ====
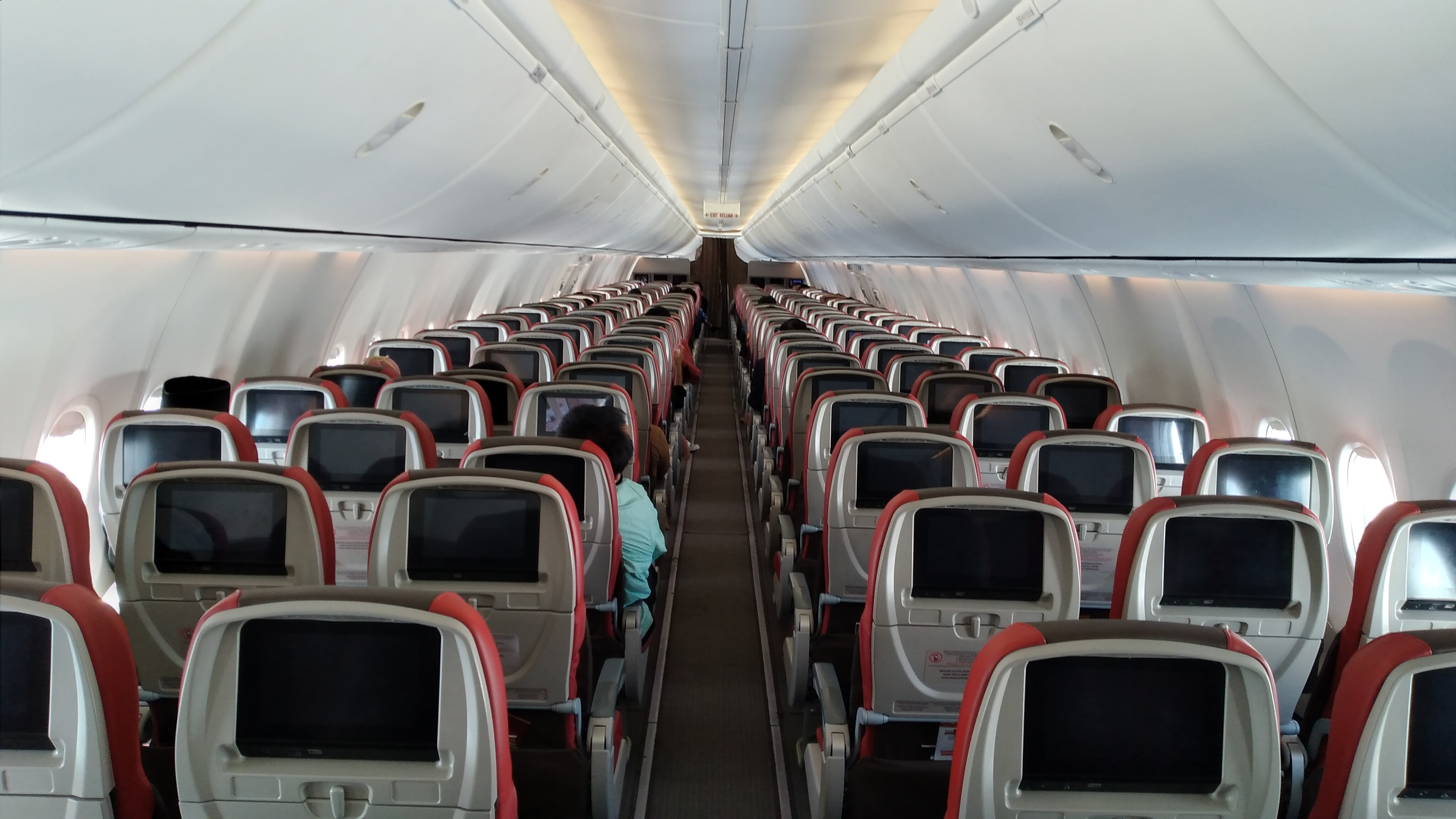
Boeing 737-900 economy class cabin

Economy class is offered on all aircraft. Seats are in a 3-3 configuration on narrow body aircraft and in a 3-3-3 configuration on the Airbus A330-300. Inflight entertainment is available to economy class passengers through personal IFE monitors as well as through the Batik Entertainment wireless streaming service. All passengers are offered complimentary snacks and meals.

=== Lounge ===
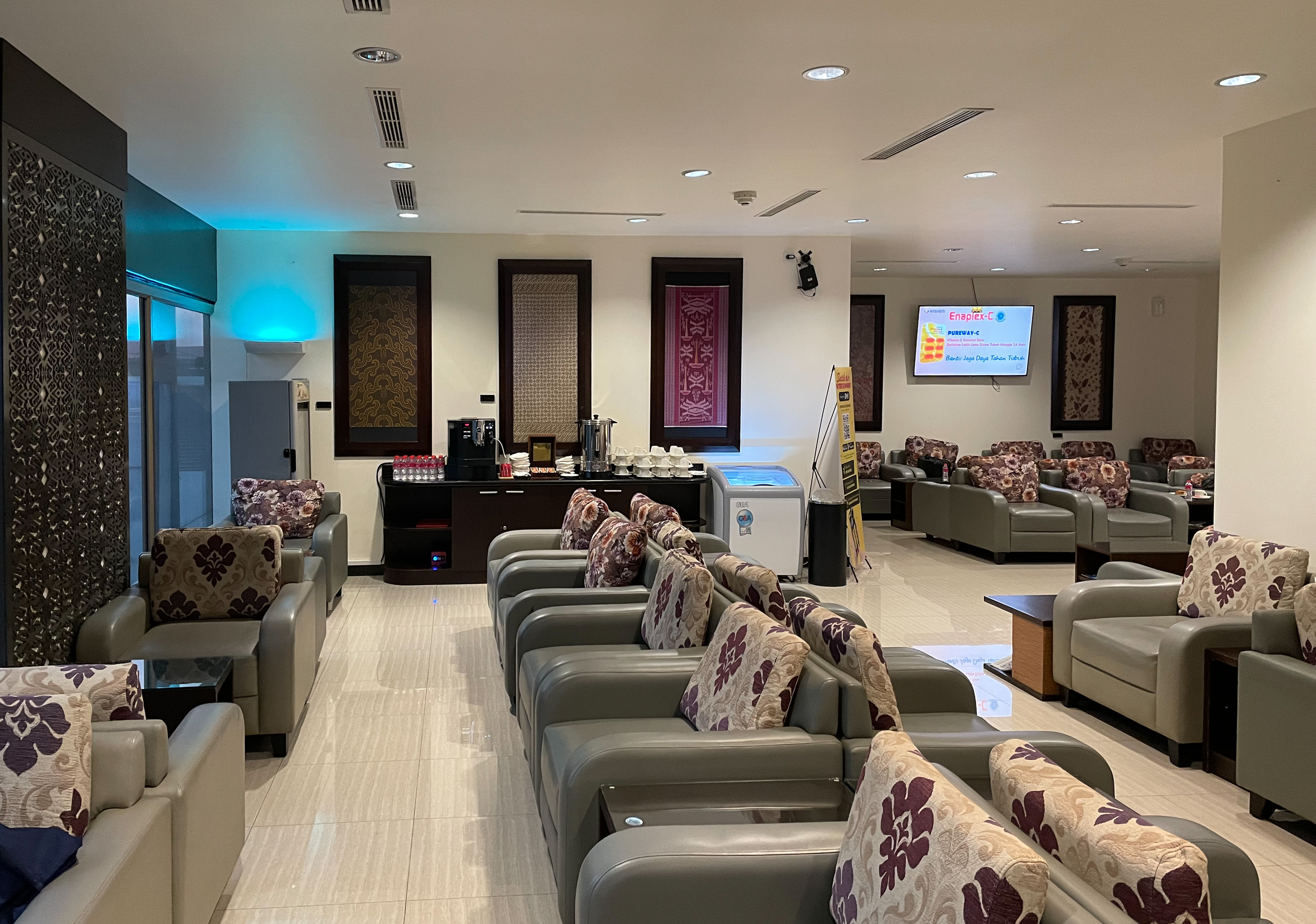
Batik Air Business Class Lounge at Soekarno–Hatta International Airport

Batik Air operates two lounges, one at Soekarno–Hatta International Airport and another at Halim Perdanakusuma International Airport. The lounges are open only to passengers traveling in business class, and offer food and drinks, and wireless internet.

On 28 October 2022, the lounge in Soekarno–Hatta International Airport caught fire, traced to an electrical short circuit in the lounge's wiring. No one was hurt in the incident.

== Accidents and incidents ==
- On 6 November 2015, Batik Air Flight 6380, a Boeing 737-9GPER (registered as PK-LBO), overran the runway by 100 meters on landing at Yogyakarta Airport, which caused the nose landing gear to collapse. The aircraft was minorly damaged, and all 177 people on board survived.
- On 4 April 2016, Batik Air Flight 7703, operated by a Boeing 737-8GP(WL) with registration PK-LBS, collided with an ATR-42-600 aircraft on takeoff from runway 24 at Halim Perdanakusuma Airport. The ATR-42-600, operated by TransNusa and registered PK-TNJ, was being towed at the time. No casualties were reported.
- On 25 January 2024, Batik Air Flight 6723, an Airbus A320-200 flying from Kendari to Jakarta, veered off-course for 28 minutes after both its pilots fell asleep mid-flight, before they woke up and resumed normal course, during which they did not respond to communications from air traffic control in Jakarta. All 159 occupants on board were unharmed. Both pilots' licenses were suspended as a result of the incident.
- On 14 June 2024, Batik Air Flight 6015, a Boeing 737-800 registered PK-LDK, departed Denpasar International Airport, Indonesia for the inaugural passenger transport flight of a new service to Canberra, Australia. Whilst in a holding pattern, the aircraft descended below the minimum holding altitude of 5600 ft, and at one point the aircraft passed 924 ft above terrain.

== See also ==
- Wings Air
- Rusdi Kirana
- List of airlines of Indonesia
- Aviation in Indonesia
