= Lion Air Group =

Indonesian airline holding company

PT Lion Group
- Trade name: Lion Air Group
- Type: Private
- Industry: Airline
- Founded: 15 November 1999; 26 years ago
- Headquarters: Lion Air Tower, Jakarta, Indonesia
- Key people: Rusdi Kirana (founder); Kusnan Kirana (co-founder); Daniel Putut (president director & CEO)
- Subsidiaries: Airlines: Lion Air; Wings Air; Batik Air; Batik Air Malaysia; Thai Lion Air; Other services: Batam Aero Technic; Lion Bizjet; Lion Hotel & Plaza; Lion Parcel
- Website: www.lionair.co.id/en/home (Lion Air Indonesia); www.batikair.com (Batik Air Indonesia); www.lionairthai.com (Lion Air Thai); www.malindoair.com (Malindo/Batik Air Malaysia)

PT Lion Group, dba Lion Air Group, is a holding company based in Indonesia. The group consists of several airlines from Southeast Asia, currently Lion Air, Wings Air, Batik Air, Batik Air Malaysia, and Thai Lion Air. The Lion Air Group primarily competes with the Malaysian-based low-cost carrier AirAsia, Vietnamese-based low-cost carrier VietJet Air, and domestic competitor of national airline Garuda Indonesia.

== History ==
The airline group is founded on the success of Lion Air, which was founded in 1999. With the growth of aviation and travel within Indonesia, Lion Air founded Wings Air in 2003, a regional carrier wholly owned by Lion Air.

=== Regional expansion ===
With the expansion of regional rival AirAsia into the Indonesian aviation market, the Lion Group established Malindo Air in 2012, to compete with AirAsia in the Malaysian aviation market. The airline's name derived from a combination of the countries Malaysia and Indonesia.

Local competition from national airline Garuda Indonesia also arose in 2012, as Garuda announced intentions to form an off-shoot of its Citilink brand into its own low-cost carrier. Further intentions to expand Citilink were announced, such that it could compete with Lion Air in the domestic low-cost travel market. In response, Lion Group announced a full-service competitor to Garuda Indonesia in the form of Batik Air.

To further expand into the region, Lion Air announced its intention to launch Thai Lion Air, based in Bangkok, Thailand. This would allow the group to further encroach on AirAsia's market share, as well as compete with local low-cost carrier Nok Air.

In 2017, the Lion Air Group managed to surpass 50% market share domestically for the first time.

In 2021, after the launch of Super Air Jet, rumors arose that the airline belonged to Lion Air Group after the airline was headed by Ari Azhari, a former general manager of services for Lion Air Group. The airline however rejected any claims of formal ties with Lion Air and its subsidiaries.

== Operations ==
The Lion Air Group are based in three different countries in Southeast Asia and have several operations, most of which are airlines.

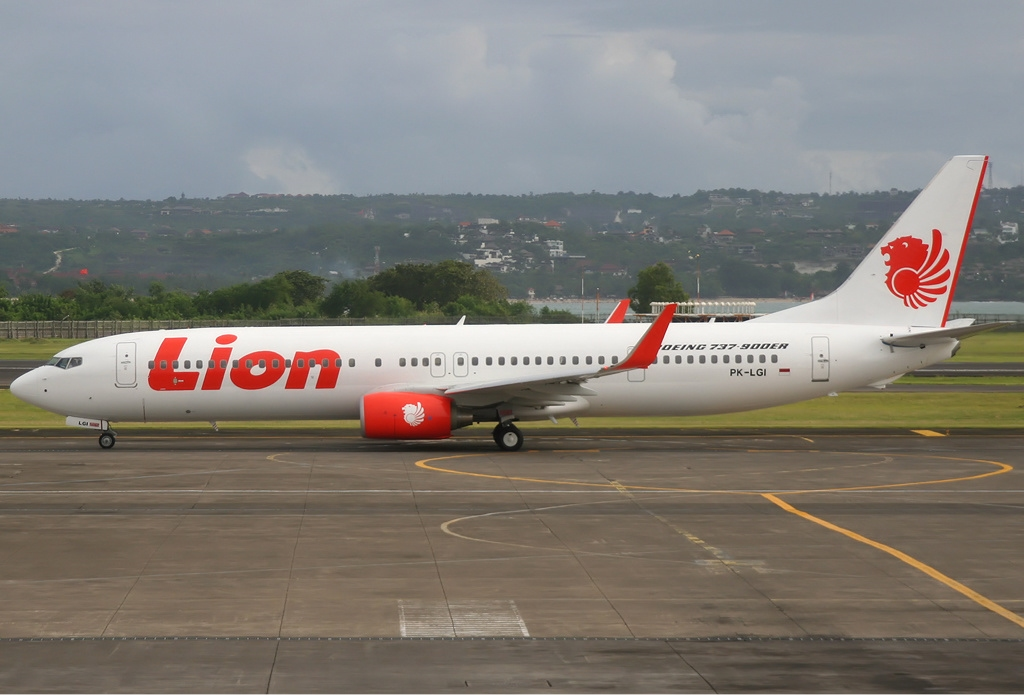
A Lion Air Boeing 737-900ER at Ngurah Rai International Airport in Bali, Indonesia

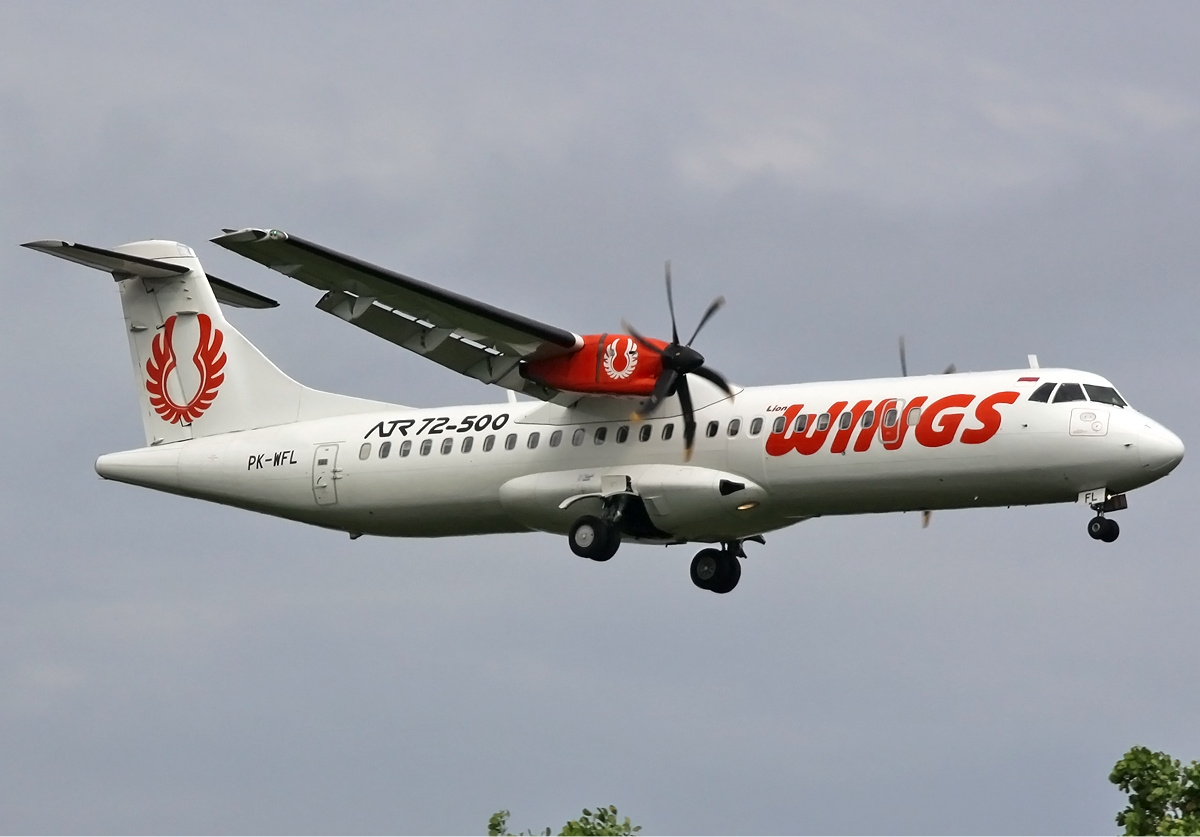
A Wings Air ATR 72–500

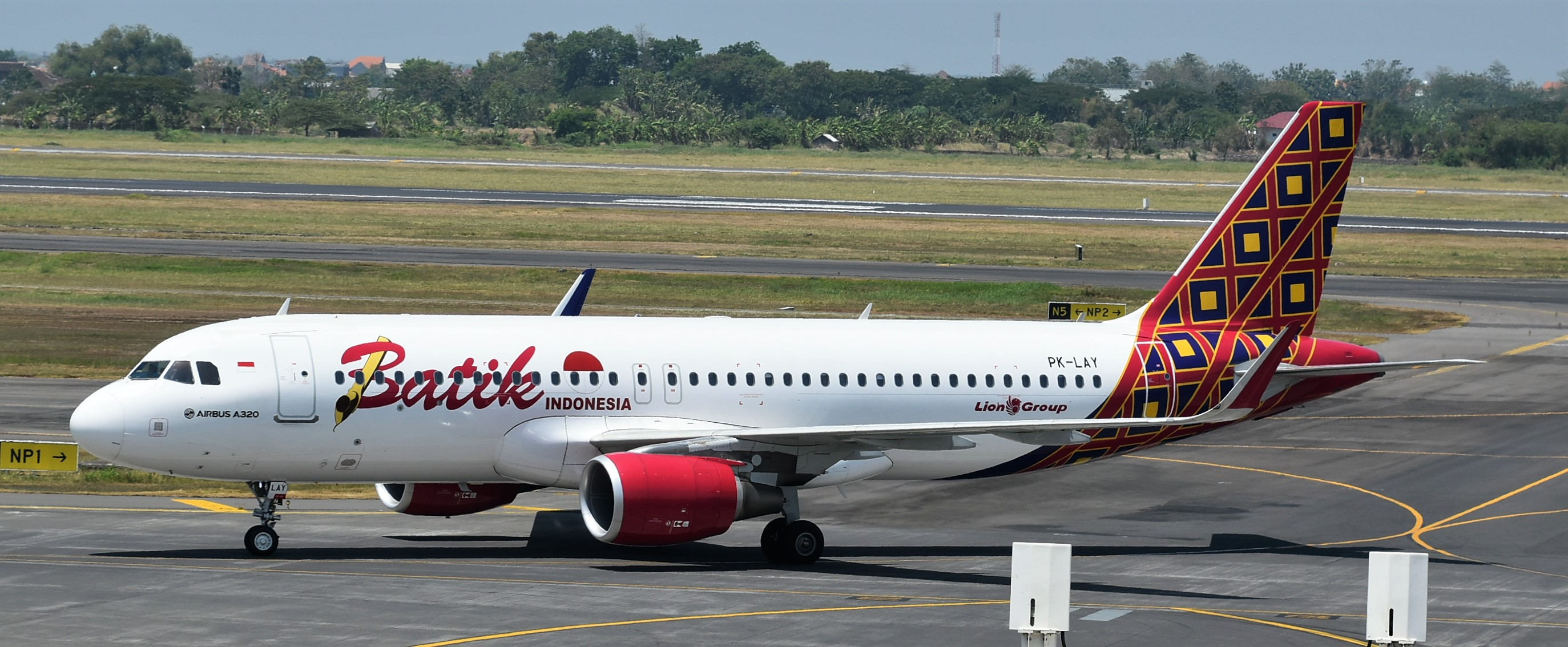
A Batik Air Airbus A320 at Juanda International Airport in Surabaya, Indonesia

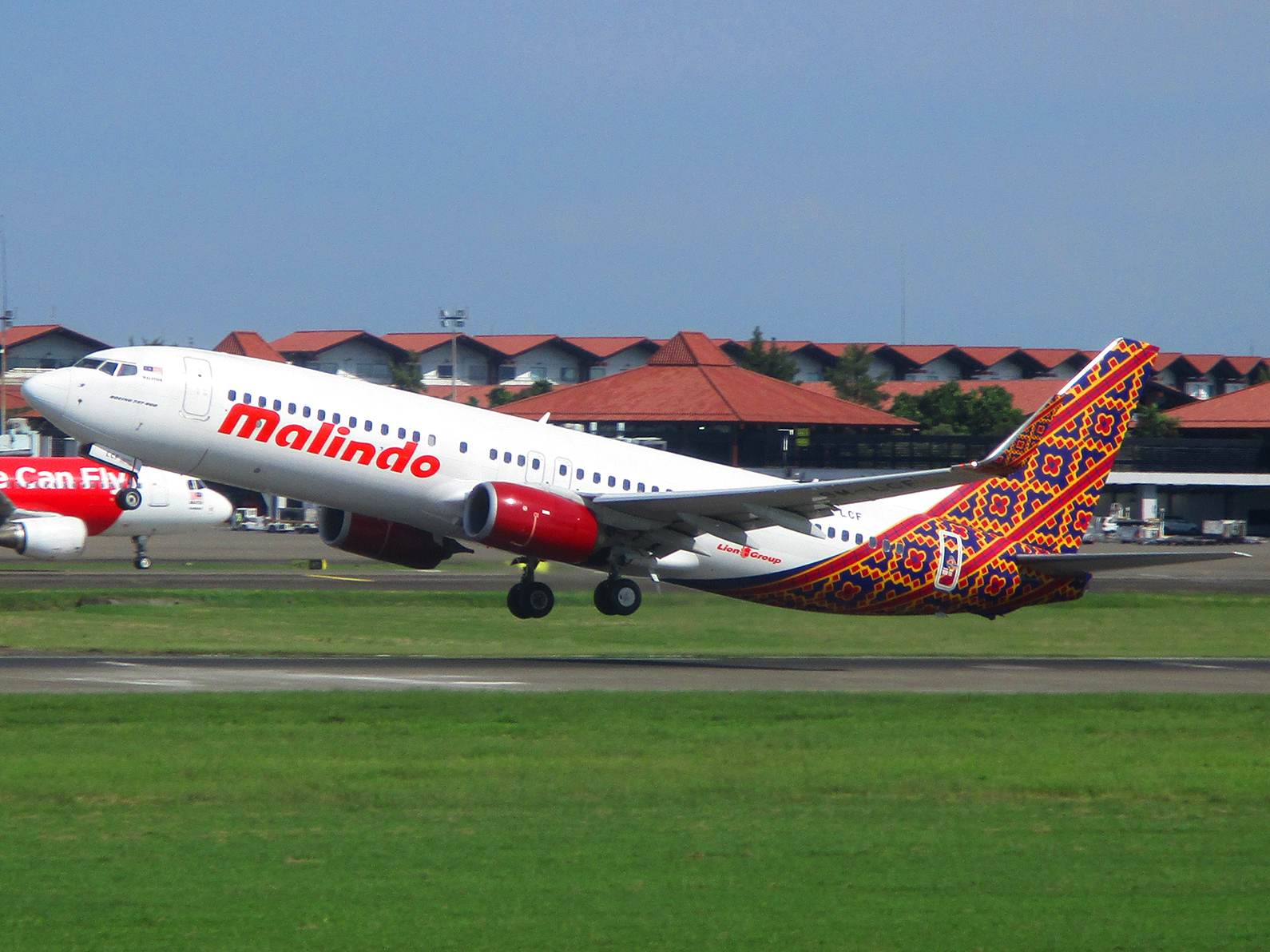
Malindo Air Boeing 737-800 at Soekarno–Hatta International Airport, Tangerang, Banten

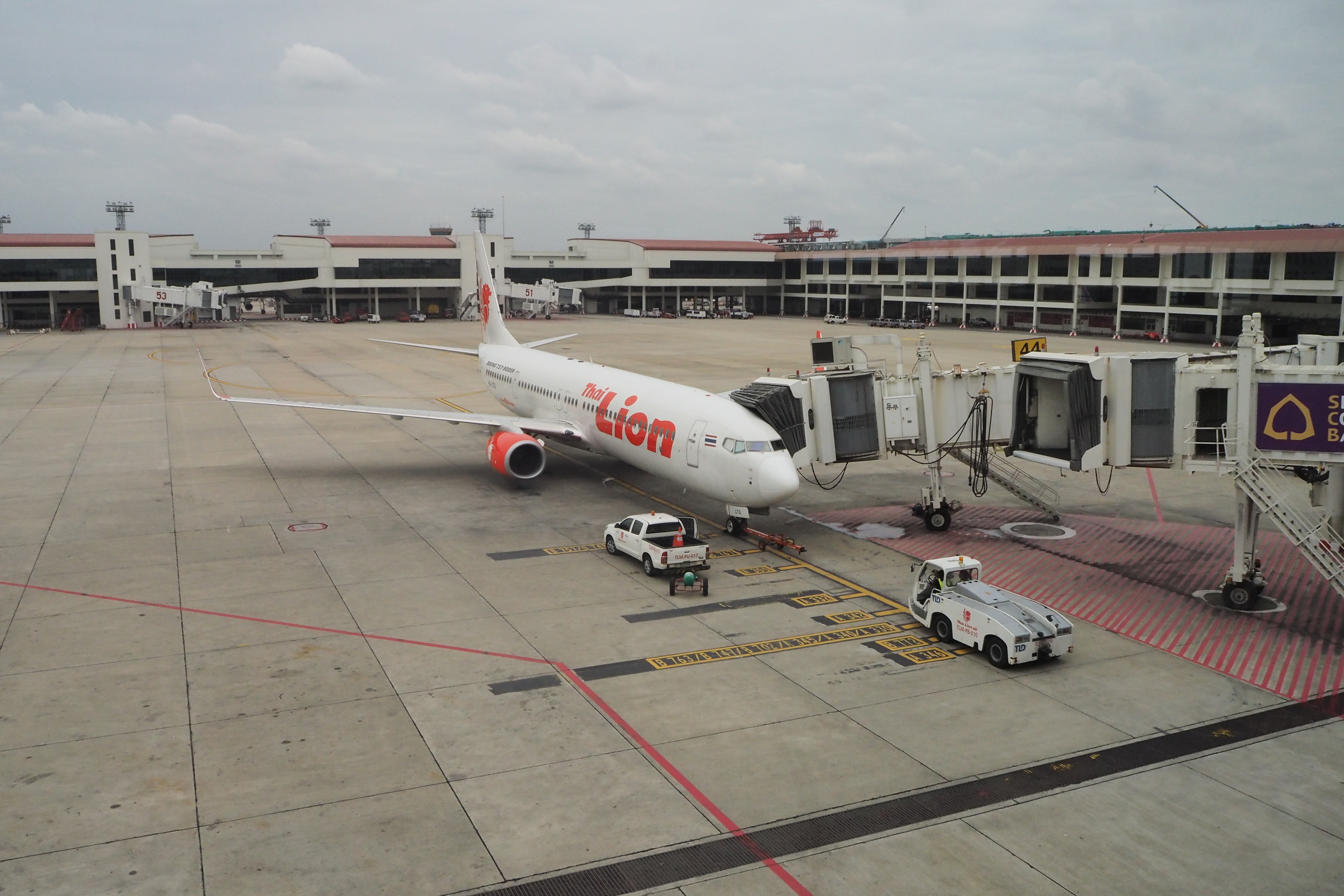
A Thai Lion Air Boeing 737-900ER

Country	Company	Service
Indonesia	Lion Air	Low-cost carrier
Indonesia	Wings Air	Regional airline
Indonesia	Batik Air	Full-service airline
Indonesia	Lion Bizjet	Business jet charter
Indonesia	Lion Parcel	Courier/Freight transport
Indonesia	Lion Hotel & Plaza	Hospitality
Malaysia	Batik Air Malaysia	Full-service airline
Thailand	Thai Lion Air	Low-cost carrier

== Operators and fleet ==
Lion Air Group fleet
Aircraft	In service	Operator
Airbus A320-200	47	Batik Air
Airbus A320neo	1	Batik Air
Airbus A330-300	11	Batik Air Malaysia
Airbus A330-300	11	Lion Air
Airbus A330-900	8	Lion Air
Airbus Helicopters EC135	1	Lion Bizjet
ATR 72-500	20	Wings Air
ATR 72-600	59	Wings Air
Boeing 737-800	80	Batik Air
Boeing 737-800	80	Batik Air Malaysia
Boeing 737-800	80	Lion Air
Boeing 737-800	80	Thai Lion Air
Boeing 737-900ER	67	Lion Air
Boeing 737-900ER	67	Thai Lion Air
Boeing 737 MAX 8	17	Batik Air Malaysia
Boeing 737 MAX 9	4	Lion Air
Hawker Beechcraft 900XP	2	Lion Bizjet

== Subsidiary company ==
PT Lion Express
- Trade name: Lion Parcel
- Industry: Courier
- Founded: Jakarta (2013; 13 years ago)
- Founders: Rusdi Kirana
- Headquarters: Indonesia
- Key people: Farian Kirana (chief executive officer)
- Number of employees: ▲1.037 (2020)
- Parent: Lion Air
- Website: lionparcel.com

=== Lion Parcel ===
PT. Lion Express also known as Lion Parcel is a subsidiary company of Lion Air Group, is the logistic company that serves nationwide and Asia. Their services is door-to-door delivery enhanced with Innovation and Technology.

==== Environmental record ====
Lion Parcel has taken measures to control their environmental effect by use of electric vehicles produced by GESITS (PT Wika Industri Manufaktur). Lion Parcel changed vehicles in certain delivery fleets in order to use electric vehicles. Certain new vehicles use electricity, to which Lion Parcel hopes to reduce air pollution in Indonesia and carbon emission produced by conventional vehicle. With this initiative, they become the first logistic company in Indonesia that has implement the use of electric vehicles.

==== Awards ====
- Gold Predicate from Indonesian Contact Center Association (ICCA) during The Best Contact Center Indonesia 2021'2 event for category "The Best Digital Media"
- Impactful Digital Marketing Campaign of The Year for JAGOPACK, Marketeers Editor's Choice Award 2021.
- Industry Marketing Champion 2021 for the Logistics Sector, Marketeer of the Year 2021, MARKPLUS, INC.

== See also ==
- List of airline holding companies
