= Thai Lion Air =

Low-cost airline of Thailand

Thai Lion Mentari Co. Ltd ไทยไลอ้อนแอร์

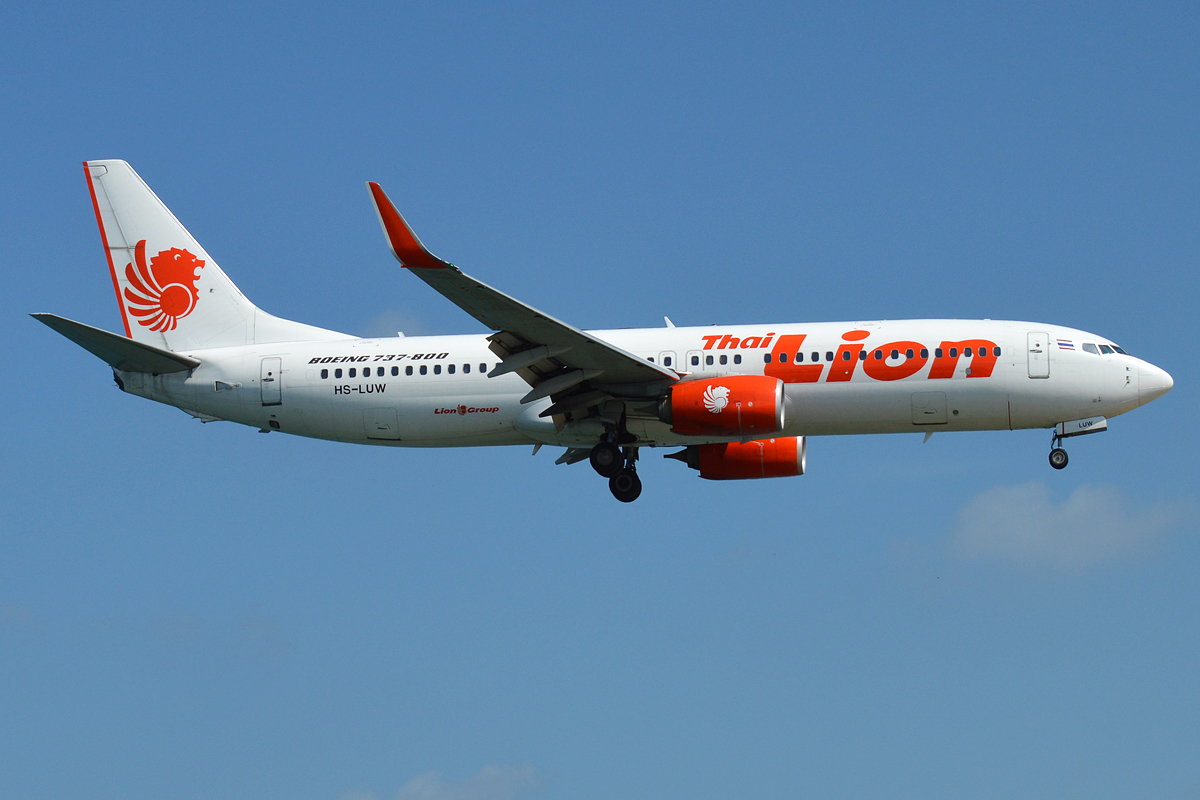
- A Boeing 737-800 of Thai Lion Air
IATA	ICAO	Call sign
SL	TLM	MENTARI
- Founded: 4 December 2013; 12 years ago
- Operating bases: Bangkok–Don Mueang; Taipei–Taoyuan
- Fleet size: 28
- Destinations: 50
- Parent company: Lion Air Group
- Headquarters: Don Mueang, Bangkok, Thailand
- Key people: Atsawin Yangkiratiwon (CEO)
- Website: www.lionairthai.com

Thai Lion Air is a Thai low-cost airline operating with Thai partners as an associate company of the Indonesian Lion Air. The carrier operates from Bangkok's Don Mueang International Airport, with plans to serve domestic and international scheduled flights from other cities in Thailand. Its head office is in the Don Mueang District, Bangkok.

== History ==
Its inaugural flight was on December 4, 2013 on the Bangkok- Chiang Mai route, with full services one day later. Thai Lion Air concluded the agreement with fellow Lion Air subsidiary Malindo Air on December 10, 2013, allowing both carriers to serve the flight between Kuala Lumpur International Airport and Bangkok.

== Destinations ==
As of September 2025, Thai Lion Air flies (or has flown) to the following destinations:

Country	City	Airport	Notes	Refs
Cambodia	Siem Reap	Siem Reap International Airport	Airport Closed	
China	Changzhou	Changzhou Benniu International Airport		
China	Changsha	Changsha Huanghua International Airport		
China	Chengdu	Chengdu Shuangliu International Airport	Terminated	
China	Chengdu	Chengdu Tianfu International Airport		
China	Chongqing	Chongqing Jiangbei International Airport		
China	Guangzhou	Guangzhou Baiyun International Airport		
China	Haikou	Haikou Meilan International Airport		
China	Hangzhou	Hangzhou Xiaoshan International Airport		
China	Hefei	Hefei Xinqiao International Airport		
China	Jinan	Jinan Yaoqiang International Airport		
China	Kunming	Kunming Changshui International Airport	Terminated	
China	Nanchang	Nanchang Changbei International Airport		
China	Nanjing	Nanjing Lukou International Airport		
China	Ningbo	Ningbo Lishe International Airport		
China	Quanzhou	Quanzhou Jinjiang International Airport		
China	Shanghai	Shanghai Pudong International Airport		
China	Shenzhen	Shenzhen Bao'an International Airport		
China	Taiyuan	Taiyuan Wusu International Airport	Charter	
China	Tianjin	Tianjin Binhai International Airport		
China	Wuhan	Wuhan Tianhe International Airport		
China	Xi'an	Xi'an Xianyang International Airport		
China	Xuzhou	Xuzhou Guanyin International Airport	Terminated	
China	Zhengzhou	Zhengzhou Xinzheng International Airport		
Hong Kong	Hong Kong	Hong Kong International Airport		
India	Ahmedabad	Ahmedabad Airport		
India	Amritsar	Sri Guru Ram Das Ji International Airport		
India	Bengaluru	Kempegowda International Airport		
India	Chennai	Chennai International Airport		
India	Delhi	Indira Gandhi International Airport	begins 14 November 2025	
India	Kochi	Cochin International Airport		
India	Kolkata	Netaji Subhas Chandra Bose International Airport		
India	Mumbai	Chhatrapati Shivaji Maharaj International Airport		
Indonesia	Denpasar	Ngurah Rai International Airport		
Indonesia	Jakarta	Soekarno–Hatta International Airport		
Indonesia	Surabaya	Juanda International Airport		
Japan	Fukuoka	Fukuoka Airport	Terminated	
Japan	Nagoya	Chubu Centrair International Airport	Terminated	
Japan	Osaka	Kansai International Airport	Terminated	
Japan	Naha	Naha Airport		
Japan	Tokyo	Narita International Airport		
Macau	Macau	Macau International Airport		
Malaysia	Penang	Penang International Airport		
Myanmar	Yangon	Yangon International Airport	Terminated	
Nepal	Kathmandu	Tribhuvan International Airport		
Philippines	Manila	Ninoy Aquino International Airport	Terminated	
Singapore	Singapore	Changi Airport		
Taiwan	Kaohsiung	Kaohsiung International Airport		
Taiwan	Taipei	Taoyuan International Airport	Base	
Thailand	Bangkok	Don Mueang International Airport	Base	
Thailand	Chiang Mai	Chiang Mai International Airport		
Thailand	Chiang Rai	Chiang Rai International Airport		
Thailand	Hat Yai	Hat Yai International Airport		
Thailand	Hua Hin	Hua Hin Airport	Terminated	
Thailand	Khon Kaen	Khon Kaen Airport		
Thailand	Krabi	Krabi International Airport		
Thailand	Nakhon Si Thammarat	Nakhon Si Thammarat Airport		
Thailand	Nan	Nan Nakhon Airport	Terminated	
Thailand	Pattaya	U-Tapao International Airport		
Thailand	Phitsanulok	Phitsanulok Airport		
Thailand	Phuket	Phuket International Airport		
Thailand	Surat Thani	Surat Thani International Airport		
Thailand	Trang	Trang Airport		
Thailand	Ubon Ratchathani	Ubon Ratchathani Airport		
Thailand	Udon Thani	Udon Thani International Airport		
Vietnam	Da Nang	Da Nang International Airport	Terminated	
Vietnam	Hanoi	Noi Bai International Airport	Terminated	
Vietnam	Ho Chi Minh City	Tan Son Nhat International Airport	Terminated	

=== Interline agreements ===
Thai Lion Air currently has Interline agreements with APG Airlines and its parent company Lion Air

== Fleet ==
=== Current fleet ===
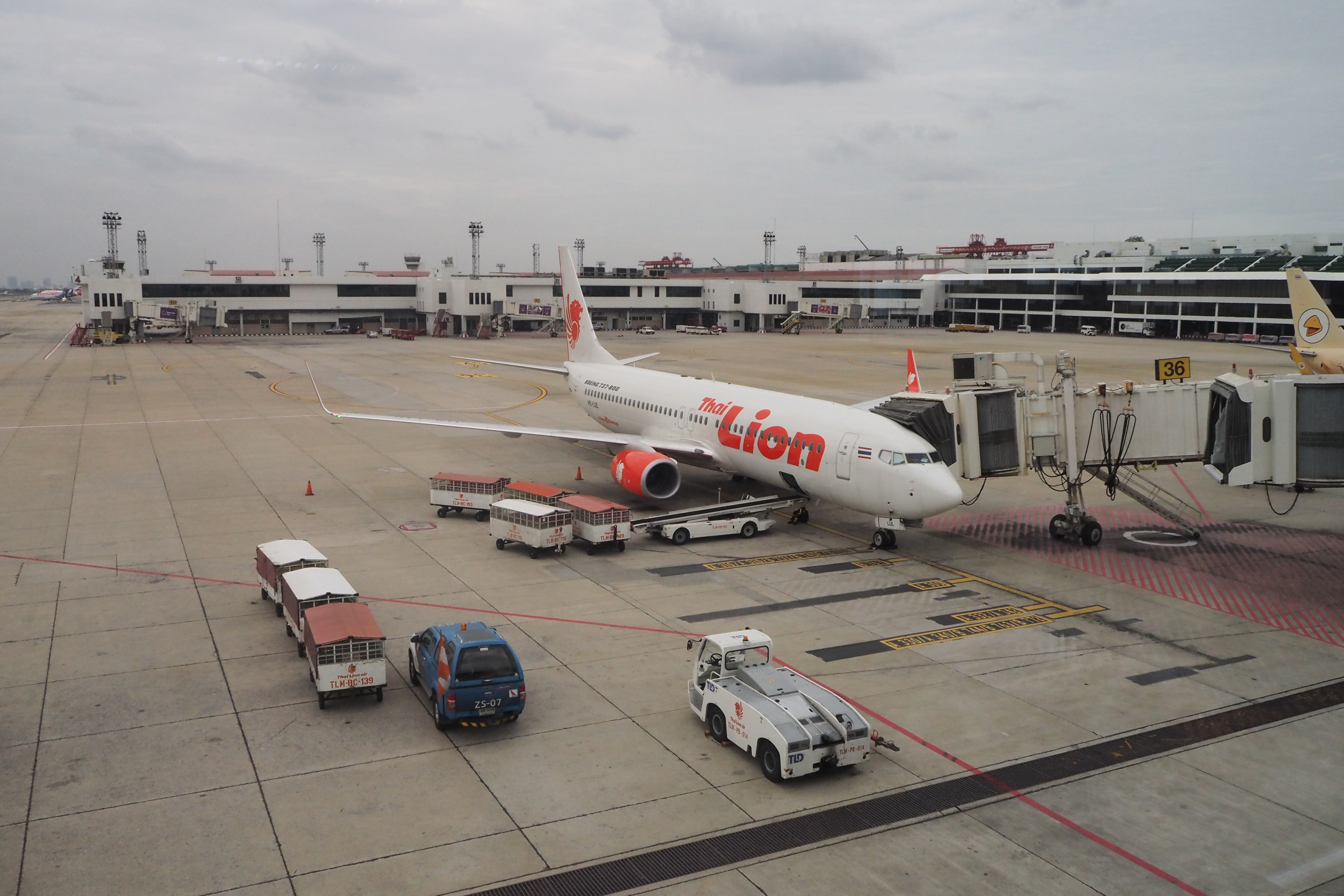
A Thai Lion Air Boeing 737-800

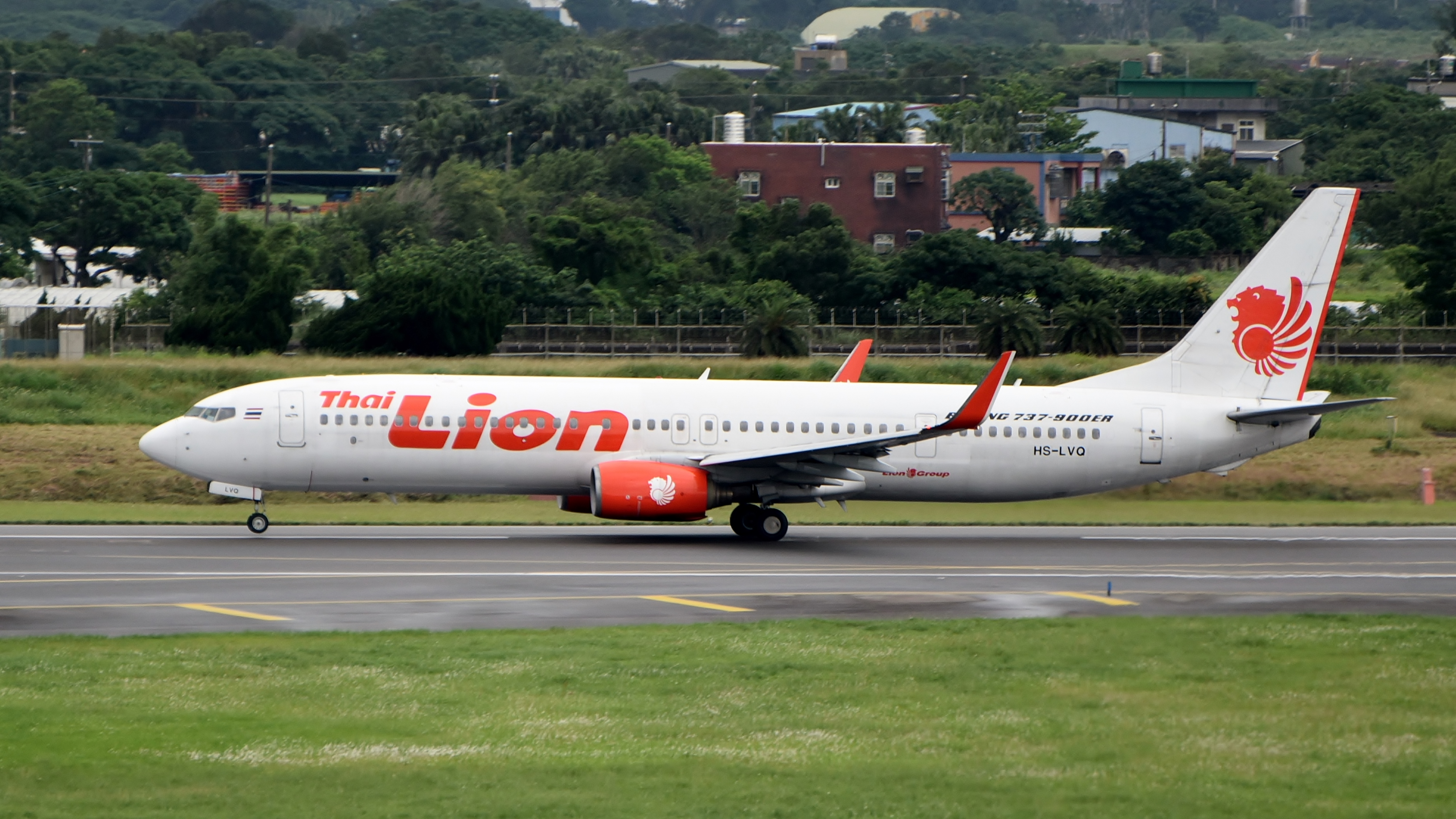
A Thai Lion Air Boeing 737-900ER

As of August 2025, Thai Lion Air operates the following aircraft:

Thai Lion Air fleet
Aircraft	In service	Orders	Passengers	Notes
Boeing 737-800	20	—	189	
Boeing 737-900ER	8	—	215	
Total	28	—		
