= Batik Air Malaysia =

Full-service airline of Malaysia

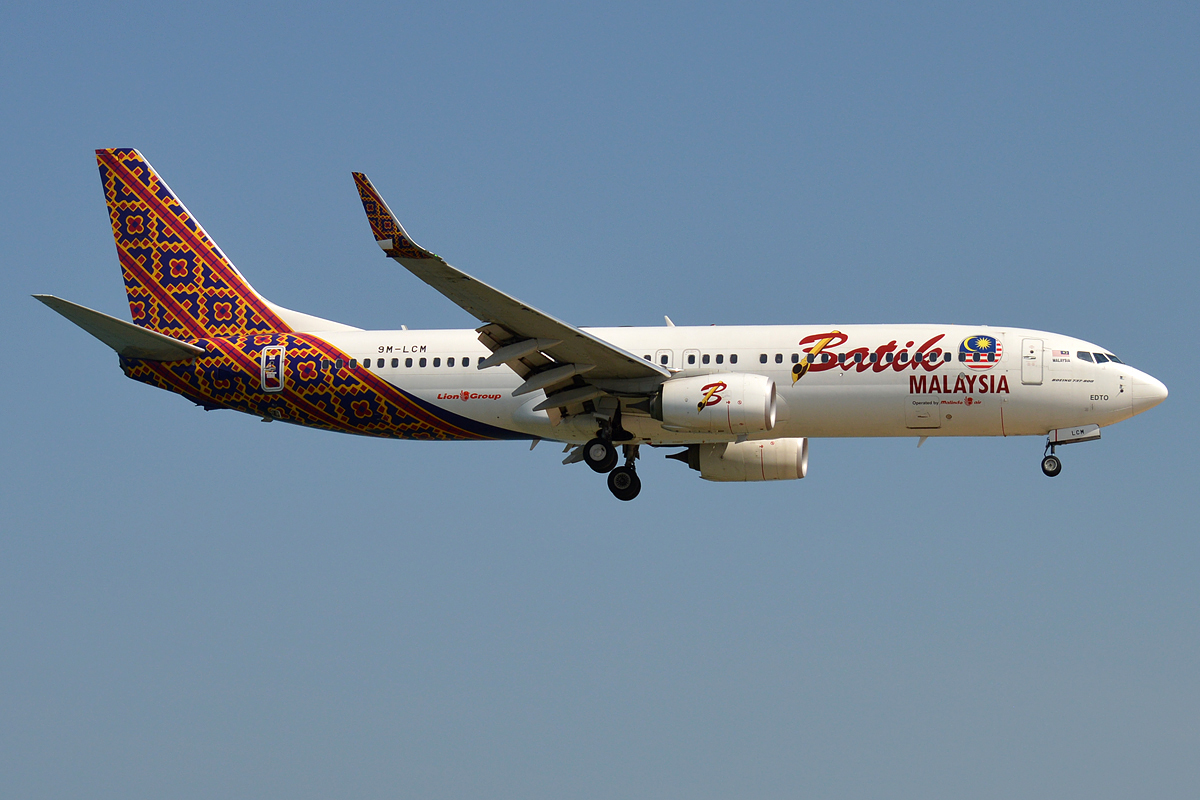
- A Boeing 737-800 of Batik Air Malaysia
IATA	ICAO	Call sign
OD	MXD	MALINDO
- Founded: 27 September 2012; 14 years ago (as Malindo Air)
- Commenced operations: 22 March 2013; 13 years ago (as Malindo Air); 28 April 2022; 4 years ago (as Batik Air Malaysia)
- Hubs: Kuala Lumpur International Airport; Sultan Abdul Aziz Shah Airport
- Frequent-flyer program: Batik Air Club
- Fleet size: 49
- Destinations: 56
- Parent company: Sky One Investors Sdn Bhd.; Lion Air Group
- Headquarters: Ara Damansara, Petaling Jaya, Selangor, Malaysia
- Key people: Datuk Chandran Rama Muthy (CEO); Edward Sirait (President, Lion Group)
- Website: www.batikair.com.my

Batik Air Malaysia (formerly known as Malindo Air) is a Malaysian full-service airline and a subsidiary of Indonesia's Lion Air Group. Headquartered in Ara Damansara, Petaling Jaya, Selangor, the airline operates domestic and international flights across Asia-Pacific, South Asia and the Middle East. It was established in 2013 under the name Malindo Air, offering a hybrid service model that combined low-cost fares with selected premium services.

In 2022, the airline adopted the Batik Air Malaysia brand, reflecting Lion Air Group's initiative to consolidate its full-service carriers under a unified identity. The rebranding also enhanced its synergy with Batik Air (Indonesia), aligning operational and branding strategies to enhance connectivity and competitiveness in the aviation sector.

With its primary hub at Kuala Lumpur International Airport, Batik Air Malaysia utilises a modern fleet, including Boeing 737 MAX and Airbus A330 aircraft, to support its regional and long-haul operations. In 2017, it became the first airline in the world to operate the Boeing 737 MAX 8, marking a significant milestone in its fleet development.

== History ==
=== Malindo Air ===
==== 2012–2013: Founding and initial launch ====
Batik Air Malaysia, initially known as Malindo Air, was founded in 2012 as a joint venture between Malaysia's National Aerospace and Defence Industries (NADI), which holds a 51% ownership stake, and Indonesia's Lion Air, which owns the remaining 49%. The name Malindo is a portmanteau of Malaysia and Indonesia, reflecting the collaboration between the two countries. The airline was established to challenge the dominance of low-cost carriers, particularly AirAsia, by offering a hybrid business model that combined low-cost fares with select business class services.

The airline officially began operations on 22 March 2013, with its first flight from Kuala Lumpur International Airport to Kota Kinabalu, Sabah. Malindo Air initially operated a dual-class seating arrangement, offering both economy and business class options. The airline's strategy was to appeal to price-conscious travelers while providing amenities typically associated with full-service carriers, such as complimentary meals, personal in-flight entertainment systems and a generous baggage allowance.

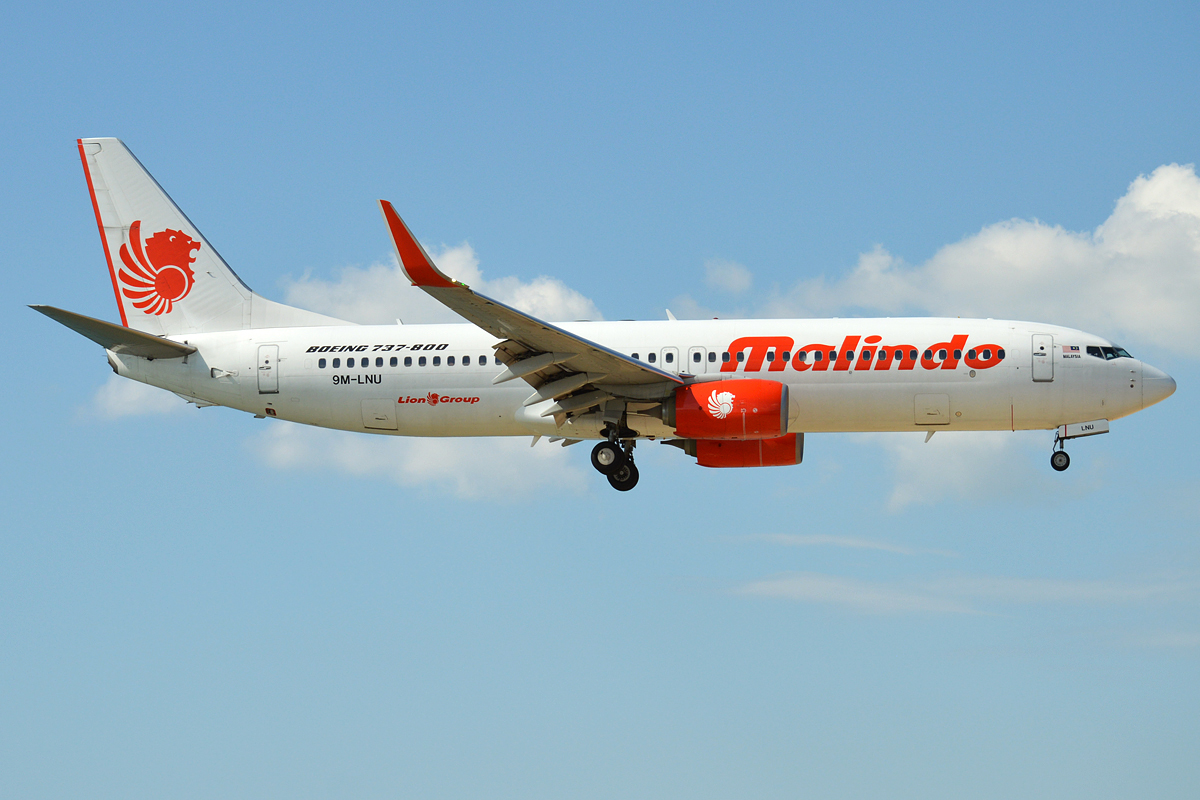
A Malindo Air Boeing 737-800

==== 2013–2019: Expansion and network growth ====
In its first year of operation, Malindo Air rapidly expanded its domestic network. By mid-2013, the airline had added several Malaysian cities to its service roster and had begun operating international routes. The first international destination, Dhaka, Bangladesh, was introduced on 28 August 2013. By the end of 2015, Malindo Air had grown to serve 19 international destinations, transporting nearly 4 million passengers and capturing around 6% of Malaysia's aviation market share.

This expansion was supported by a growing fleet, which included Boeing 737-900ER aircraft for long-haul flights and ATR72-600 turboprops for regional services. The fleet allowed Malindo Air to reach smaller airports and regional destinations effectively, further driving its growth in both the domestic and international markets.

Between 2016 and 2018, Malindo Air focused on further fleet expansion and enhancing its international presence. The airline set an ambitious goal of increasing its fleet size to 100 aircraft by the end of the decade. During this period, Malindo added new routes to destinations in Australia, India, Thailand, Indonesia and Bangladesh. By mid-2017, the airline served more than 54 destinations across 16 countries, with significant expansions in Southeast Asia and beyond.

In 2017, Malindo Air became the first airline to receive the Boeing 737 MAX 8, with the first delivery arriving on 16 May 2017. The aircraft entered service on 22 May of the same year. Additionally, Malindo Air introduced in-flight connectivity services under the brands "Malindo WiFi" and "Malindo Mobile," allowing passengers to stay connected during their flights. This move was part of the airline's broader strategy to enhance the passenger experience and keep pace with technological advancements in the aviation industry.

=== Batik Air Malaysia ===
==== 2019–2022: Full-service transition amid global challenges ====
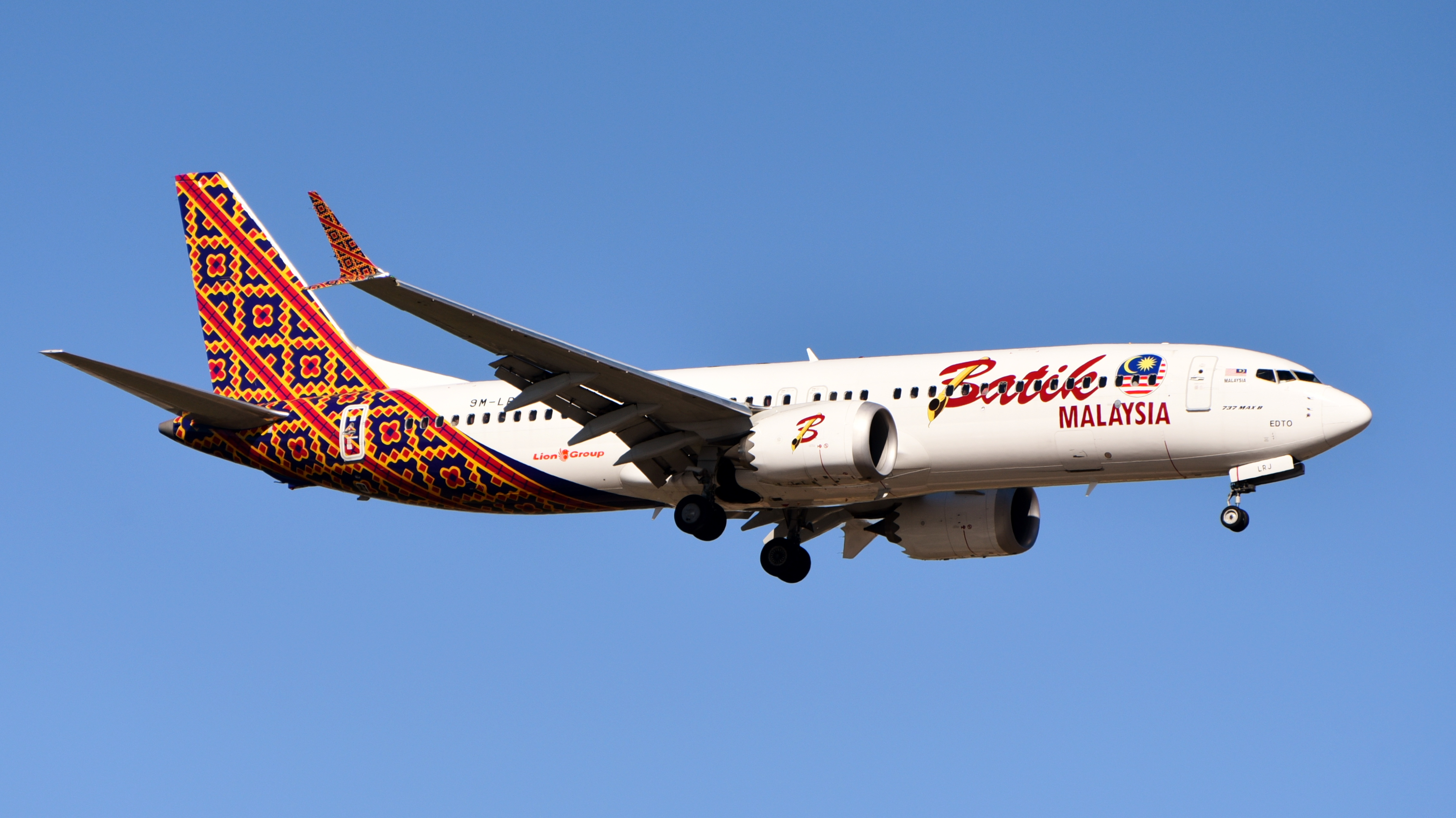
Boeing 737 MAX 8 following the airline's rebranding. In 2017, the company became the first airline globally to operate the Boeing 737 MAX.

In 2019, under the leadership of CEO Chandran Rama Muthy, Malindo Air shifted from its original hybrid model to a full-service carrier. This strategic move was aimed to improve the airline's competitive positioning against established full-service carriers like Malaysia Airlines, while also reducing consumer confusion about its service offerings. The transition was part of a broader effort to align Malindo Air more closely with the full-service airlines within the Lion Air Group.

During this time, the airline expanded its international routes, notably to Japan and Australia. However, the global aviation industry was significantly impacted by the onset of the COVID-19 pandemic in early 2020. The pandemic caused widespread operational disruptions as travel restrictions were enforced, forcing Malindo Air to scale back operations.

On 28 April 2022, Malindo Air underwent a major rebranding, officially adopting the name Batik Air Malaysia. This change was part of Lion Group's strategy to unify its full-service airline operations under a single brand identity. The development was also aimed at strengthening Batik Air Malaysia's presence at Kuala Lumpur International Airport, a key hub for Lion Group's network and at better integrating the airline into the group's broader operations.

As part of the rebranding, Batik Air Malaysia updated its branding, marketing materials and fleet. The airline also began receiving Boeing 737 MAX 8 aircraft in late 2022, marking a significant modernization of its fleet. These new aircraft are more fuel-efficient and aligned with the airline's long-term sustainability and operational goals.

==== 2023–present: Post-pandemic growth and expansion ====
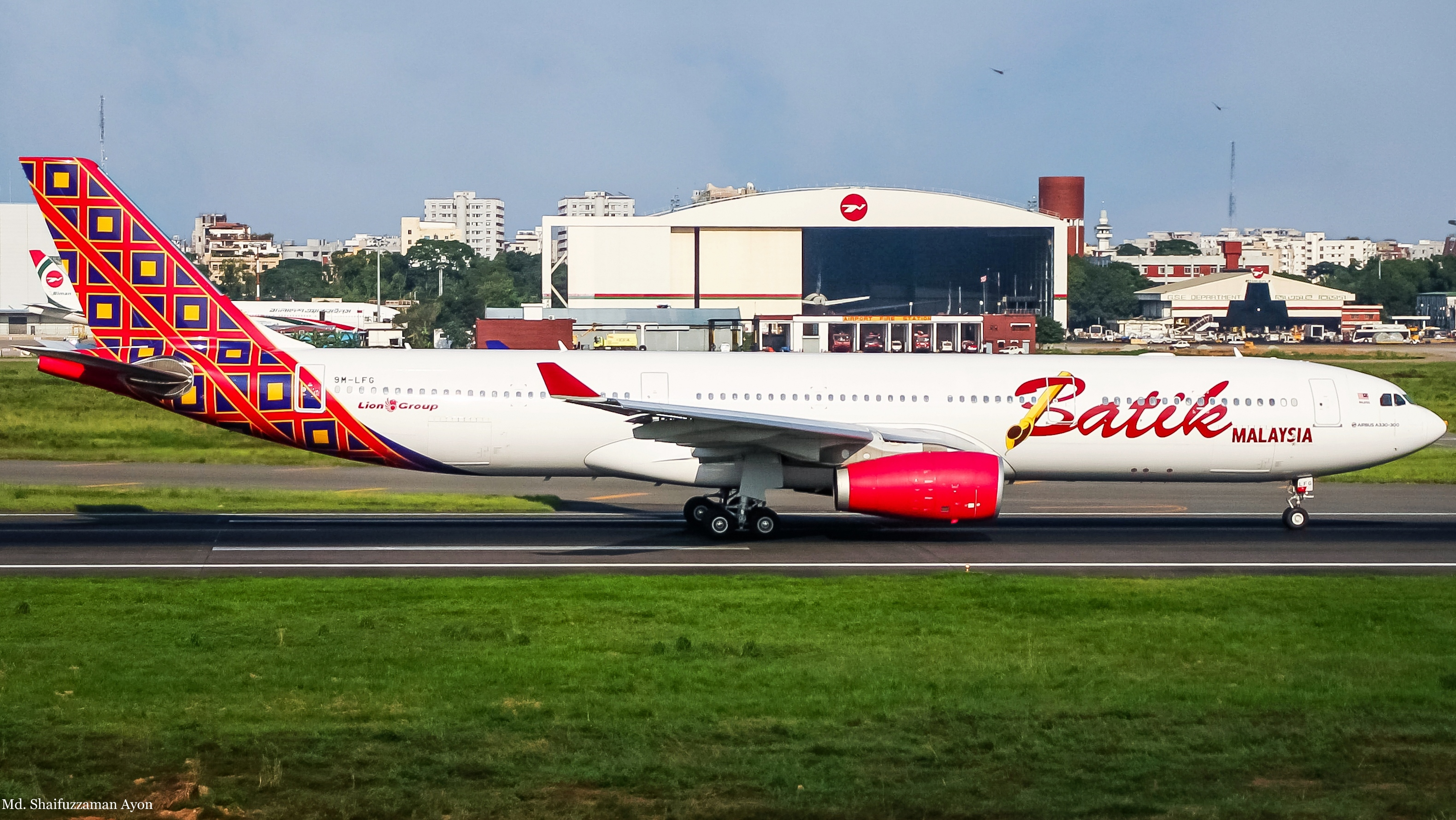
Airbus A330-343 at Hazrat Shahjalal International Airport.

As of late 2024, Batik Air Malaysia operates a fleet of approximately 32 aircraft, including Boeing 737-800s, Boeing 737 MAX 8s and Airbus A330-300s. The airline serves around 79 destinations across the Asia-Pacific region, including major cities in Southeast Asia, India, Australia and other parts of Asia. Since rebranding, Batik Air Malaysia has focused on improving its customer service offerings, including enhancing in-flight meal options and providing Wi-Fi services on a larger number of its flights.

Batik Air Malaysia continues to expand its network, both domestically within Malaysia and internationally across the Asia-Pacific region. The airline has pursued codeshare agreements with other carriers to improve connectivity and offer more options for passengers traveling across Southeast Asia and beyond.

== Destinations ==
As of October 2025, Batik Air Malaysia flies (or has flown) to the following destinations:

Country	City	Airport	Notes	Refs
Australia	Adelaide	Adelaide Airport	Terminated	
Australia	Brisbane	Brisbane Airport		
Australia	Melbourne	Melbourne Airport		
Australia	Perth	Perth Airport		
Australia	Sydney	Sydney Airport		
Bangladesh	Chittagong	Shah Amanat International Airport	Terminated	
Bangladesh	Dhaka	Hazrat Shahjalal International Airport		
Cambodia	Phnom Penh	Phnom Penh International Airport	Terminated	
China	Changsha	Changsha Huanghua International Airport		
China	Chengdu	Chengdu Tianfu International Airport		
China	Guangzhou	Guangzhou Baiyun International Airport		
China	Guilin	Guilin Liangjiang International Airport		
China	Guiyang	Guiyang Longdongbao International Airport		
China	Haikou	Haikou Meilan International Airport		
China	Harbin	Harbin Taiping International Airport	Seasonal	
China	Huangshan	Huangshan Tunxi International Airport		
China	Kunming	Kunming Changshui International Airport		
China	Nanning	Nanning Wuxu International Airport	Terminated	
China	Sanya	Sanya Phoenix International Airport	Terminated	
China	Shijiazhuang	Shijiazhuang Zhengding International Airport	Terminated	
China	Wuhan	Wuhan Tianhe International Airport	Terminated	
China	Xiamen	Xiamen Gaoqi International Airport		
China	Zhangjiajie	Zhangjiajie Hehua International Airport		
China	Zhengzhou	Zhengzhou Xinzheng International		
East Timor	Dili	Presidente Nicolau Lobato International Airport		
India	Amritsar	Sri Guru Ram Dass Jee International Airport	Terminated	
India	Bengaluru	Kempegowda International Airport		
India	Delhi	Indira Gandhi International Airport		
India	Kochi	Cochin International Airport		
India	Mumbai	Chhatrapati Shivaji Maharaj International Airport		
India	Tiruchirappalli	Tiruchirappalli International Airport		
India	Varansi	Lal Bahadur Shastri Airport	Terminated	
India	Visakhapatnam	Visakhapatnam Airport	Terminated	
Indonesia	Bandung	Husein Sastranegara Airport	Terminated	
Indonesia	Banjarmasin	Syamsudin Noor International Airport		
Indonesia	Batam	Hang Nadim International Airport		
Indonesia	Denpasar	Ngurah Rai International Airport		
Indonesia	Jakarta	Soekarno–Hatta International Airport		
Indonesia	Lombok	Lombok International Airport		
Indonesia	Makassar	Sultan Hasanuddin International Airport	Begins 10 June 2026	
Indonesia	Padang	Minangkabau International Airport	Terminated	
Indonesia	Palembang	Sultan Mahmud Badaruddin II International Airport		
Indonesia	Pekanbaru	Sultan Syarif Kasim II International Airport		
Indonesia	Pontianak	Supadio International Airport		
Indonesia	Siborong-Borong	Raja Sisingamangaraja XII Airport	Terminated	
Indonesia	Surabaya	Juanda International Airport		
Japan	Nagoya	Chubu Centrair International Airport	Terminated	
Japan	Naha	Naha Airport		
Japan	Osaka	Kansai International Airport		
Japan	Tokyo	Narita International Airport		
Malaysia	Alor Setar	Sultan Abdul Halim Airport		
Malaysia	Bintulu	Bintulu Airport		
Malaysia	Ipoh	Sultan Azlan Shah Airport		
Malaysia	Johor Bahru	Senai International Airport		
Malaysia	Kota Bharu	Sultan Ismail Petra Airport		
Malaysia	Kota Kinabalu	Kota Kinabalu International Airport		
Malaysia	Kuala Lumpur	Kuala Lumpur International Airport	Hub	
Malaysia	Kuala Lumpur	Sultan Abdul Aziz Shah Airport	Hub	
Malaysia	Kuching	Kuching International Airport		
Malaysia	Langkawi	Langkawi International Airport		
Malaysia	Miri	Miri Airport		
Malaysia	Penang	Penang International Airport		
Malaysia	Sandakan	Sandakan Airport		
Malaysia	Sibu	Sibu Airport		
Malaysia	Tawau	Tawau Airport		
Maldives	Malé	Velana International Airport		
Myanmar	Yangon	Yangon International Airport	Terminated	
Nepal	Kathmandu	Tribhuvan International Airport		
New Zealand	Auckland	Auckland Airport	Terminated	
Pakistan	Karachi	Jinnah International Airport		
Pakistan	Lahore	Allama Iqbal International Airport		
Saudi Arabia	Jeddah	King Abdulaziz International Airport		
Sri Lanka	Colombo	Bandaranaike International Airport		
South Korea	Seoul	Incheon International Airport		
Taiwan	Kaohsiung	Kaohsiung International Airport	Terminated	
Taiwan	Taipei	Taoyuan International Airport		
Thailand	Bangkok	Don Mueang International Airport		
Thailand	Chiang Mai	Chiang Mai International Airport	Terminated	
Thailand	Hat Yai	Hat Yai International Airport		
Thailand	Krabi	Krabi International Airport		
Thailand	Phuket	Phuket International Airport		
Thailand	Surat Thani	Surat Thani International Airport	Terminated	
Uzbekistan	Tashkent	Islam Karimov Tashkent International Airport		
Vietnam	Da Nang	Da Nang International Airport		
Vietnam	Hanoi	Noi Bai International Airport		

=== Codeshare agreements ===
Batik Air Malaysia operates codeshares with the following airlines:

- Batik Air
- Emirates
- Etihad Airways
- Turkish Airlines

=== Interline agreements ===
Batik Air Malaysia has Interline agreements with the following airlines:

- All Nippon Airways
- APG Airlines
- Flydubai
- Etihad Airways
- KLM
- Lion Air
- Oman Air
- Pakistan International Airlines
- Qatar Airways
- Turkish Airlines
- XiamenAir

== Fleet ==
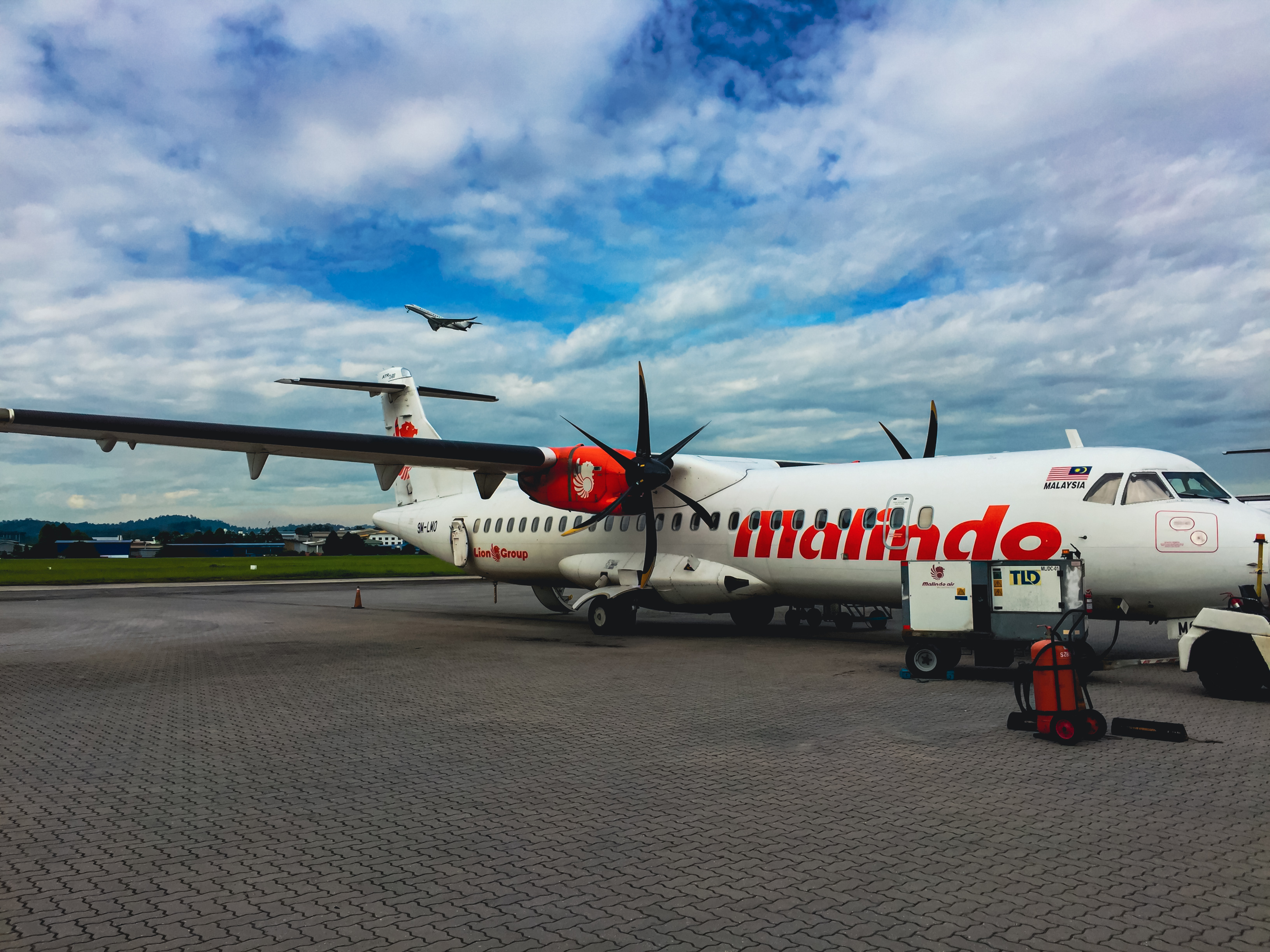
A Malindo Air ATR 72 at Sultan Abdul Aziz Shah Airport. The airline previously utilised this airport as a regional hub for its ATR 72 operations.

As of October 2026, Batik Air Malaysia operates the following aircraft:

Aircraft	In service	Orders	Passengers			Notes
Aircraft	In service	Orders	C	Y	Total	Notes
Airbus A330-300	6	—	12	365	377	Transferred from Lion Air.
Boeing 737-800	26		12	150	162	To be transferred from Batik Air.
Boeing 737 MAX 8	3	—	12	150	162	
Boeing 737 MAX 8	14	—	—	180	180	Transferred from Lion Air.
Total	49					

=== Former fleet ===
As of August 2025, Batik Air Malaysia operated 5 Airbus A330-300, 22 Boeing 737-800 and 17 Boeing 737-8 MAX.

The airline also operated the following aircraft:

Aircraft	Introduced	Retired	Total	Passengers			Notes
Aircraft	Introduced	Retired	Total	C	Y	Total	Notes
Boeing 737-900ER	2013	2021	6	12	168	180	

== See also ==
- List of airlines of Malaysia
- Transport in Malaysia
