= Pacific Royale Airways =

Indonesian commercial airline

IATA	ICAO	Call sign
RY	PRQ	SKYRIDER
- Founded: November 2011
- Commenced operations: June 11, 2012
- Ceased operations: November 2012
- Hubs: Juanda International Airport; Sultan Syarif Kasim II International Airport; Hang Nadim International Airport
- Fleet size: 3
- Destinations: 9
- Headquarters: Jakarta, Indonesia
- Key people: Samudra Sukardi (founder); Tarun Trikha (CEO); Goenarni Goenawan (shareholder)

Pacific Royale Airways was an Indonesian commercial airline which received its government flight license in November 2011. It received a formal Air Operator's Certificate (AOC) in May 2012, and made its first flight on June 11, 2012. On 6 September 2012, the airline ceased operations on a temporary basis, before having its license revoked on 19 November 2012.

== History ==
=== Founding ===
In January 2011, former Riau Airlines president director, Samudra Sukardi, announced the founding of Pacific Royale Airways as a full-service scheduled carrier, funded by himself and two further investors, Gunarni Soeworodan and Indian businessman Tarun Trikha. Combined, a total of $60 million had been invested in the launch of the airline; this included costs to acquire the 10 aircraft mandated by the Indonesian government for commercial flight operations, consisting of the purchase five Fokker 50s, as well as four leased ex-Air Berlin Airbus A320-200s and a single leased Airbus A330-300.

The airline intended to compete with Garuda Indonesia, which held a monopoly in the Indonesian full-service airline market, and announced its plans to outfit its jet aircraft with on-demand inflight entertainment screens at every seat.

On 6 November 2011, the airline received a full service flight licence from the Indonesian government.

=== Launch ===
On 7 January 2012, Pacific Royale received its first aircraft at Husein Sastranegara Airport, consisting of two ex-Ethiopian Airlines Fokker 50s, to be used for underserved rural and inter-island destinations as well as regional routes. In February 2012, the airline announced its plan to launch operations the next month, subject to regulatory approval. The plan was later delayed to June of that year as it had yet to receive its AOC. A final proving flight, the last requirement for AOC issuance, was conducted on April 21, 2012. Pacific Royale received its AOC on May 29, 2012, intending to initially launch operations from two bases in Batam and Surabaya.

Pacific Royale began commercial operations on 11 June 2012 using a Fokker 50 aircraft with a city-hopper flight originating in Surabaya and stopping at Pangkalan Bun, Semarang, and Bandung. At its launch, Sukardi announced the airline's strategy to undercut rivalling full-service airlines by 10 percent, and stated the Pacific Royale's intentions to fly to Kuala Lumpur, New Delhi, and Moscow within one year of operations.

=== Demise ===
In August 2012, CEO Samurdra Sukardi resigned, due to a dispute with shareholders regarding the terms of his new contract. Tarun Trikha replaced Sukardi as CEO following his resignation. By this time, the airline had reportedly carried over 2000 passengers with an average flight load of 65-70 percent. In the same month, it received its third Fokker 50, which underwent a reconfiguration to include a premium cabin.

On 6 September 2012, the airline announced a temporary cessation of flight operations, following the need to restructure the company as well as its operational strategy and organisational structure. By October 2012, flight operations remain ceased, with the airline citing maintenance reasons. The airline announced that operations would resume on October 16, 2012, but its fleet remained grounded the following day. Pacific Royale's flight license was revoked the following month on 19 November 2012, due to inactivity. It is currently listed as "ceased operation in 2012".

== Fleet ==
In order to meet minimum requirements for commercial flight operations, Pacific Royale planned to operate a fleet of ten aircraft. The fleet was to include five Fokker-50 turboprop airliners, all of which used to fly for Ethiopian Airlines, and five leased jet airliners–four Airbus A320s and one Airbus A330. Two Fokker-50s flew at the airline's initial launch, with more Fokkers and Airbuses entering service in the following months.

Pacific Royale Airways fleet (as of 17 October 2012)
Aircraft	In service	On order	Passengers			Notes
Aircraft	In service	On order	C	Y	Total	Notes
Fokker 50	3	2	—	58	58	
Airbus A320-200	0	4	12	138	150	
Airbus A330-300	0	1	42	250	292	
Total	2	8				

== Destinations ==
In May 2012, Pacific Royale Airways won approval to fly 62 domestic routes and 11 international routes. The airline planned to operate a network carrier strategy, and use its Fokker-50s as feeders to link Surabaya, Batam City, Banyuwangi, Madiun, Pekanbaru, the Natuna Islands and Jambi. Its Airbus jets were to be used for international routes, such as Jakarta-Mumbai, Surabaya-Singapore, Surabaya-Hong Kong, Bandung-Singapore and Bandung-Kuala Lumpur.

=== Initial routes ===
From June 11, 2012

Surabaya—Semarang—Pangkalanbun—Semarang—Bandung—Semarang—Surabaya

From June 15, 2012

Batam—Jambi—Kerinci—Padang—Batam—Pekanbaru—Batam
