= Melangguane Airport =

Airport in Indonesia

Melonguane Airport Bandar Udara Melonguane
- IATA: MNA; ICAO: WAMN

Summary
- Airport type: Public
- Operator: Government
- Serves: Melonguane, Talaud Islands Regency, North Sulawesi, Indonesia
- Time zone: WITA (UTC+08:00)
- Elevation AMSL: 5 m / 16 ft
- Coordinates: 04°00′25″N 126°40′22″E

Map
- Location in Sulawesi Location in Indonesia

Runways
| Direction | Length | | Surface |
| Direction | m | ft | Surface |
|---|---|---|---|
| 18/36 | 1,598 | 5,243 | Asphalt |
- Sources: GCM, STV

Melonguane Airport, also known as Melong Airport (Indonesian: Bandar Udara Melonguane) (IATA: MNA, ICAO: WAMN) is an airport serving the city of Melonguane, located within the Talaud Islands Regency, part of the province of North Sulawesi on the island of Karakelong in Indonesia. It is operated by the Ministry of Transportation.

== Airlines and destinations ==
| Airlines | Destinations |
|---|---|
| SAM Air | Miangas |
| Susi Air | Manado, Miangas |
| Wings Air | Manado, (Note: Manado is continuation of Tahuna flight with the same flight number.) Tahuna |

== Facilities ==
The airport resides at an elevation of 5 metres (16 ft) above mean sea level. It has one runway designated 18/36 with an asphalt surface measuring 1,598 by 30 metres (5,243 ft × 98 ft).
