= SAM Air =

Indonesian regional domestic airline

- Commenced operations: 2021; 5 years ago
- Fleet size: 2
- Destinations: 10
- Parent company: PT Semuwa Aviasi Mandiri
- Headquarters: Jakarta, Indonesia
- Key people: Wagus Hidayat
- Website: www.sam-air.net

SAM Air is an Indonesian regional domestic airline which founded in 2021, it serves domestic, pioneer and charter flights throughout eastern Indonesia and it is owned by PT. Semuwa Aviasi Mandiri.

== Destinations ==
Country	City/Regency	IATA	Airport	Note	Reference
Indonesia	Bolaang Mongondow	LKM	Raja Loloda Mokoagow Airport		
Indonesia	Buol	UOL	Pogogul Airport		
Indonesia	Gorontalo	GTO	Djalaluddin Airport		
Indonesia	Sangihe Islands	NAH	Naha Airport		
Indonesia	Siau Tagulandang Biaro Islands	BRG	Taman Bung Karno Airport		
Indonesia	Talaud Islands	MNA	Melanguane Airport		
Indonesia	Talaud Islands	MKF	Miangas Airport		
Indonesia	Manado	MDC	Sam Ratulangi International Airport		
Indonesia	Palu	PLW	Mutiara SIS Al-Jufrie International Airport		
Indonesia	Pohuwato		Panua Pohuwato Airport		

== Fleet ==
Fleet owned by SAM Air are as follows:

SAM Air Fleet
Aircraft	In operation	Class (Y)	Note	Registration Number
Cessna 208 Caravan	1		commercial	
DHC-6 Twin Otter	1 (as of July 2026)		commercial	
Total	2			

== Accidents and incidents ==
- 23 June 2023: a SAM Air aircraft Cessna 208 Caravan with registration PK-SMW crashed shortly after takeoff from Elelim Airport in Yalimo Regency, Papua Mountains Province. This accident resulted in the death of 4 passengers and 2 crew members.
- 20 October 2024: A de Havilland Canada DHC-6 Twin Otter registered as PK-SMH, crashed during a flight from Gorontalo-Jalaluddin to Bumi Panua Pohuwato killing all 4 people on board.
