= List of earthquakes in 1925 =

Earthquakes in 1925
Approximate epicenters of the earthquakes in 1925
- 4.0–5.9 magnitude
- 6.0–6.9 magnitude
- 7.0–7.9 magnitude
- 8.0+ magnitude
- Strongest: Dutch East Indies, west of West Papua (province) November 10 (Magnitude 7.3)
- Deadliest: China, Yunnan Province March 16 (Magnitude 7.0) 5,000 deaths
- Total fatalities: 6,193

Number by magnitude
- 9.0+: 0
- 8.0–8.9: 0
- 7.0–7.9: 12
- 6.0–6.9: 53
- 5.0–5.9: 4

This is a list of earthquakes in 1925. Only magnitude 6.0 or greater earthquakes will appear on the list. Lower magnitude events are also included if they caused death, injury or damage. Events which occurred in remote areas will be excluded from the list as they wouldn't have generated significant media interest. All dates are listed according to UTC time. It was a fairly busy year with several deadly events occurring. Most notably was an earthquake in China in March which left at least 5,000 dead. Other deadly events occurred in Iran, Japan, the Philippines and California. No earthquake exceeded a magnitude of 7.3; in the vast majority of years there have been at least one or two events much more powerful than that.

== Overall ==
=== By death toll ===
Rank	Death toll	Magnitude	Location	MMI	Depth (km)	Date
1	5,000	6.8	China, Yunnan Province	( )	10.0	March 16
2	500	5.5	Iran Razavi Khorasan Province	( )	0.0	December 14
3	395	6.6	Japan, Hyogo Prefecture, Honshu	( )	5.0	May 23
4	200	5.8	Turkey, Ardahan Province	VIII (Severe)	0.0	January 9
5	51	7.2	Philippines, north of Samar	IX (Violent)	20.0	November 13
6	17	6.7	Philippines, Negros (island)	IX (Violent)	15.0	May 5
7	13	6.8	United States, Santa Barbara, California	IX (Violent)	10.0	June 29
8	12	5.8	China, Yunnan	VII (Very strong)	0.0	October 14

- Note: At least 10 casualties

=== By magnitude ===
Rank	Magnitude	Death toll	Location	MMI	Depth (km)	Date
1	7.3	0	Dutch East Indies, west of West Papua (province)	( )	15.0	November 10
= 2	7.2	0	Russian, Kuril Islands	( )	35.0	January 18
= 2	7.2	0	New Hebrides	( )	35.0	March 22
= 2	7.2	0	northern Mid-Atlantic Ridge	( )	10.0	October 13
= 2	7.2	51	Philippines, north of Samar	IX (Violent)	20.0	November 13
= 3	7.1	0	south Indian Ocean	( )	10.0	April 11
= 3	7.1	0	Dutch East Indies, northern Molucca Sea	( )	15.0	May 3
= 4	7.0	0	Taiwan, south of	( )	15.0	April 16
= 4	7.0	0	Dutch East Indies, northern Molucca Sea	( )	15.0	June 3
= 4	7.0	0	New Guinea, East Sepik Province	( )	25.0	June 9
= 4	7.0	0	Russian SFSR, Commander Islands	( )	15.0	August 19
= 4	7.0	0	Mexico, off west coast of	( )	15.0	November 16

- Note: At least 7.0 magnitude

== Notable events ==
=== January ===
January
- Strongest: 7.2 M_{w} Russian SFSR
- Deadliest: 5.8 M_{w} Turkey; 200 deaths
- Total fatalities: 200

Number by magnitude
- 8.0–8.9: 0
- 7.0–7.9: 1
- 6.0–6.9: 2
- 5.0–5.9: 1

Date	Country and location	M_{w}	Depth (km)	MMI	Notes	Casualties	
Date	Country and location	M_{w}	Depth (km)	MMI	Notes	Dead	Injured
5	Peru, Apurimac Region	6.5	200.0				
9	Turkey, Ardahan Province	5.8	0.0	VIII	200 people were killed. The depth was unknown.	200	
18	Russian SFSR, Kuril Islands	7.2	35.0				
28	Russian SFSR, Kuril Islands	6.8	30.0		This event was to the southwest of the previous event. This was the beginning of an earthquake swarm that continued into February.		

=== February ===
February
- Strongest: 6.9 M_{w} Russian SFSR
- Total fatalities: 0

Number by magnitude
- 8.0–8.9: 0
- 7.0–7.9: 0
- 6.0–6.9: 7

Date	Country and location	M_{w}	Depth (km)	MMI	Notes	Casualties	
Date	Country and location	M_{w}	Depth (km)	MMI	Notes	Dead	Injured
1	Russian SFSR, Kuril Islands	6.5	30.0		Earthquake swarm.		
2	Russian SFSR, Kuril Islands	6.5	30.0		Earthquake swarm.		
2	Russian SFSR, east of the Kuril Islands	6.8	35.0		Earthquake swarm.		
9	France, southeast of the Loyalty Islands	6.6	15.0				
13	New Zealand, Kermadec Islands	6.5	35.0				
20	Russian SFSR, Kuril Islands	6.9	15.0		This event was in another part of the Kuril Islands not affected by the previous events.		
23	United States, southern Alaska	6.6	25.0		A tsunami caused some minor damage.		

=== March ===
March
- Strongest: 7.2 M_{w} New Hebrides
- Deadliest: 6.8 M_{w} China; 5,000 deaths
- Total fatalities: 5,000

Number by magnitude
- 8.0–8.9: 0
- 7.0–7.9: 1
- 6.0–6.9: 6

Date	Country and location	M_{w}	Depth (km)	MMI	Notes	Casualties	
Date	Country and location	M_{w}	Depth (km)	MMI	Notes	Dead	Injured
1	Canada, southern Quebec	6.3	35.0		This was one of the largest earthquakes in eastern Canada.		
15	Dutch East Indies, south of Sumba	6.0	50.0		Foreshock.		
15	Dutch East Indies, south of Sumba	6.2	50.0				
16	China, Yunnan	6.8	10.0		Major destruction was caused by the 1925 Dali earthquake. 5,000 people were killed. Another 1,000 were injured. A large number of homes were destroyed.	5,000	1,000
22	New Hebrides	7.2	35.0				
26	Philippines, south of Mindanao	6.5	180.0				
29	Panama, Darien Province	6.4	15.0				

=== April ===
April
- Strongest: 7.1 M_{w} south Indian Ocean
- Total fatalities: 0

Number by magnitude
- 8.0–8.9: 0
- 7.0–7.9: 2
- 6.0–6.9: 3

Date	Country and location	M_{w}	Depth (km)	MMI	Notes	Casualties	
Date	Country and location	M_{w}	Depth (km)	MMI	Notes	Dead	Injured
7	Philippines, east of Mindanao	6.3	25.0				
11	southern Indian Ocean	7.1	10.0				
16	Taiwan, south of	7.0	15.0				
19	Japan, south of Honshu	6.6	331.5				
22	Dutch East Indies, Halmahera Sea	6.0	35.0				

=== May ===
May
- Strongest: 7.1 M_{w} Dutch East Indies
- Deadliest: 6.6 M_{w} Japan; 395 deaths
- Total fatalities: 412

Number by magnitude
- 8.0–8.9: 0
- 7.0–7.9: 1
- 6.0–6.9: 7

Date	Country and location	M_{w}	Depth (km)	MMI	Notes	Casualties	
Date	Country and location	M_{w}	Depth (km)	MMI	Notes	Dead	Injured
3	Dutch East Indies, Molucca Sea	7.1	15.0				
5	Philippines, Negros (island)	6.7	15.0	IX	17 people were killed and some homes were destroyed.	17	
5	Dutch East Indies, Molucca Sea	6.7	15.0		Aftershock.		
13	India, Andaman Islands	6.0	35.0				
15	Chile, Antofagasta Region	6.4	30.0				
23	Japan, Hyogo Prefecture, Honshu	6.6	15.0		The 1925 North Tajima earthquake caused 395 deaths and collapsed 3,333 homes.	395	
25	Philippines, north of Sibuyan Island	6.2	35.0	VII			
27	Japan, Sea of Japan	6.5	400.0				

=== June ===
June
- Strongest: 7.0 M_{w} 2 events
- Deadliest: 6.8 M_{w} United States; 13 deaths
- Total fatalities: 13

Number by magnitude
- 8.0–8.9: 0
- 7.0–7.9: 2
- 6.0–6.9: 8

Date	Country and location	M_{w}	Depth (km)	MMI	Notes	Casualties	
Date	Country and location	M_{w}	Depth (km)	MMI	Notes	Dead	Injured
3	Dutch East Indies, Molucca Sea	7.0	15.0				
4	United States, off the coast of northern California	6.0	35.0				
7	Colombia, Tolima Department	6.3	15.0				
9	New Guinea, East Sepik Province	7.0	25.0				
20	Afghanistan, Badakhshan Province	6.5	230.0				
23	Ecuador, Orellana Province	6.8	170.0				
28	United States, east of Canyon Ferry Lake, Montana	6.9	15.0	VIII	Damage was limited due to the event occurring in a remote area. Damage costs were $150,000 (1925 rate).		
28	Japan, Ryukyu Islands	6.4	35.0				
28	India, Andaman Islands	6.5	60.0				
29	United States, Santa Barbara Channel, California	6.8	10.0	IX	The 1925 Santa Barbara earthquake resulted in 13 people being killed. Major property damage was caused. Costs were $8 million (1925 rate).	13	

=== July ===
July
- Strongest: 6.6 M_{w} Antigua and Barbuda
- Total fatalities: 0

Number by magnitude
- 8.0–8.9: 0
- 7.0–7.9: 0
- 6.0–6.9: 5

Date	Country and location	M_{w}	Depth (km)	MMI	Notes	Casualties	
Date	Country and location	M_{w}	Depth (km)	MMI	Notes	Dead	Injured
4	New Guinea, Bougainville Island	6.2	15.0				
6	Greece, Patras	6.5	120.0				
7	Mexico, Jalisco	6.4	20.0				
7	Antigua and Barbuda, east of	6.5	60.0	rowspan="2"| These 2 events struck 3 hours apart. This is an example of a doublet earthquake.			
7	Antigua and Barbuda, east of	6.6	60.0				

=== August ===
August
- Strongest: 7.0 M_{w} Russian SFSR
- Deadliest: 5.9 M_{w} Turkey; 3 deaths
- Total fatalities: 3

Number by magnitude
- 8.0–8.9: 0
- 7.0–7.9: 1
- 6.0–6.9: 1
- 5.0–5.9: 1

Date	Country and location	M_{w}	Depth (km)	MMI	Notes	Casualties	
Date	Country and location	M_{w}	Depth (km)	MMI	Notes	Dead	Injured
7	Turkey, Isparta Province	5.9	0.0	VIII	3 people died and 2,043 homes were destroyed. The depth was unknown.	3	
7	Mexico, Michoacan	6.4	75.0				
19	Russian SFSR, Commander Islands	7.0	15.0				

=== September ===
September
- Strongest: 6.5 M_{w} Antigua and Barbuda
- Total fatalities: 0

Number by magnitude
- 8.0–8.9: 0
- 7.0–7.9: 0
- 6.0–6.9: 1

Date	Country and location	M_{w}	Depth (km)	MMI	Notes	Casualties	
Date	Country and location	M_{w}	Depth (km)	MMI	Notes	Dead	Injured
29	Antigua and Barbuda, north of	6.5	35.0				

=== October ===
October
- Strongest: 7.2 M_{w} northern Mid-Atlantic Ridge
- Deadliest: 5.8 M_{w} China; 12 deaths
- Total fatalities: 12

Number by magnitude
- 8.0–8.9: 0
- 7.0–7.9: 1
- 6.0–6.9: 4
- 5.0–5.9: 1

Date	Country and location	M_{w}	Depth (km)	MMI	Notes	Casualties	
Date	Country and location	M_{w}	Depth (km)	MMI	Notes	Dead	Injured
5	Nicaragua, Managua Department	6.6	35.0		Major damage was reported.		
13	northern Mid-Atlantic Ridge	7.2	10.0				
14	China, Yunnan	5.8	0.0	VII	12 deaths were caused as well as at least 101 injuries. 500 homes were destroyed.	12	101+
18	Dutch East Indies, Talaud Islands	6.2	220.0				
22	Dutch East Indies, off the southwest coast of Sumatra	6.7	35.0				
30	British Solomon Islands, eastern Guadalcanal	6.4	15.0				

=== November ===
November
- Strongest: 7.3 M_{w} Indonesia
- Deadliest: 7.2 M_{w} Philippines; 51+ deaths
- Total fatalities: 51+

Number by magnitude
- 8.0–8.9: 0
- 7.0–7.9: 3
- 6.0–6.9: 2

Date	Country and location	M_{w}	Depth (km)	MMI	Notes	Casualties	
Date	Country and location	M_{w}	Depth (km)	MMI	Notes	Dead	Injured
10	Dutch East Indies, west of West Papua (province)	7.3	15.0				
13	Philippines, north of Samar	7.2	20.0	IX	The earthquake caused major damage and produced a tsunami. The waves were responsible for at least 51 deaths and 101 injuries.	51+	101+
16	Mexico, off the west coast	7.0	15.0		A tsunami was generated which washed away a port.		
17	Peru, off the central coast	6.3	10.0				
28	New Hebrides	6.6	25.0				

=== December ===
December
- Strongest: 6.7 M_{w} Laos
- Deadliest: 5.5 M_{w} Iran; 500 deaths
- Total fatalities: 502

Number by magnitude
- 8.0–8.9: 0
- 7.0–7.9: 0
- 6.0–6.9: 6
- 5.0–5.9: 2

Date	Country and location	M_{w}	Depth (km)	MMI	Notes	Casualties	
Date	Country and location	M_{w}	Depth (km)	MMI	Notes	Dead	Injured
7	China, southern Xinjiang Province	6.0	35.0				
14	Iran, Razavi Khorasan Province	5.5	0.0		500 deaths were reported. The depth was unknown.	500	
18	Iran, Bushehr Province	5.5	0.0		2 people were killed and damage was caused. The depth was unknown.	2	
18	Afghanistan, Badakhshan Province	6.0	230.0				
22	Laos, Luang Namtha Province	6.7	15.0				
26	Philippines, northern Mindanao	6.5	20.0				
27	Dutch East Indies, Molucca Sea	6.3	35.0				
29	Dutch East Indies, central Sulawesi	6.5	25.0				
