= Flight 708 =

Flight 708 may refer to

- Pan Am Flight 708, crashed on 15 November 1966
- Garuda Indonesia Flight 708, crashed on 16 February 1967
- Hawthorne Nevada Airlines Flight 708, crashed on February 18, 1969
- Ethiopian Airlines Flight 708, hijack attempt on 8 December 1972
- West Caribbean Airways Flight 708, crashed on 16 August 2005
