= Talaud language =

Austronesian language spoken on the Talaud Islands

Talaud
- Native to: Indonesia
- Region: Talaud Islands, North Sulawesi
- Native speakers: (82,000 cited 2000 census)
- Language family: Austronesian: Malayo-Polynesian; Philippine; Sangiric; North; Talaud
- Dialects: Lami; Tirawata

Language codes
- ISO 639-3: tld
- Glottolog: tala1285
- Coordinates: 4.12°N 126.80°E

Talaud is an Austronesian language spoken on the Talaud Islands north of Sulawesi, Indonesia. There are 2 dialects, namely the Lami dialect (which is spoken on Miangas, Nanusa Islands, and Esang in the northern part of Karakelong Island) and the Tirawata dialect (which is used in Lirung, Kabaruan, and the southern part of Karakelong Island).

Miangas is actually a subdialect, but more different from its main dialect, Lami.

== Phonology ==
=== Consonants ===
		Labial	Alveolar	Retroflex	Palatal	Velar	Glottal
Plosive	voiceless	p	t		(c)	k	ʔ
Plosive	voiced	b	d			ɡ	
Plosive	affricate				tʃ		
Nasal		m	n			ŋ	
Fricative		β	s	ʐ	(ʃ)	ɣ	h
Rhotic	trill		r				
Rhotic	tap		ɾ				
Lateral			l				
Approximant		w					

- /tʃ/ can be heard as a palatal stop [c], depending on the dialect.
- The velar fricative sound /ɣ/ may also be pronounced as voiceless [x].
- /ʃ/ is only found in some dialects of Kaburuan Island. It corresponds to /ʐ/ in most other dialects.

=== Vowels ===
	Front	Central	Back
Close	i		u
Mid	e		o
Open		a	
