= Naha Airport (Indonesia) =

Airport in Indonesia

Naha Airport Bandar Udara Naha
- IATA: NAH; ICAO: WAMH

Summary
- Airport type: Public
- Serves: Tahuna, Sangihe Islands, Indonesia
- Time zone: WITA (UTC+08:00)
- Elevation AMSL: 5 m / 16 ft
- Coordinates: 03°40′59″N 125°31′40″E

Map
- Location in Sulawesi Location in Indonesia

Runways
Direction	Length		Surface
Direction	ft	m	Surface
15/33	3,599	1,097	Asphalt
- Source: DAFIF, STV

Naha Airport (IATA: NAH, ICAO: WAMH) is an airport serving the locality of Tahuna, on the Sangihe Islands, part of the North Sulawesi province of Indonesia. The airport is previously connected to Manado by daily Wings Air flights.

== Airlines and destinations ==
Airlines	Destinations
SAM Air	Miangas, Siau
Susi Air	Manado, Siau
Wings Air	Manado, Melongguane
