= Miangas Airport =

Miangas Airport Bandar Udara Miangas
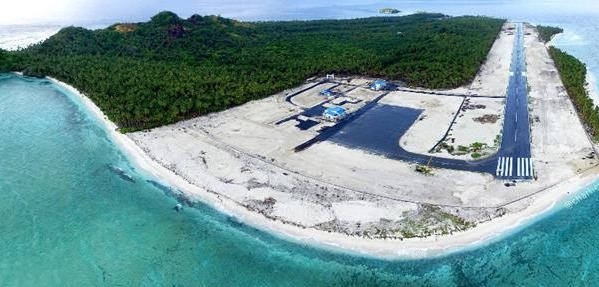
- IATA: IAX; ICAO: WAMS

Summary
- Airport type: Public
- Operator: Government
- Serves: Miangas
- Location: Talaud Islands Regency, North Sulawesi
- Time zone: WITA (UTC+08:00)
- Coordinates: 05°33′44″N 126°34′53″E

Map
- Location of the airport in Sulawesi

Runways
Direction	Length		Surface
Direction	m	ft	Surface
03/16	1,400	4,593	Asphalt

Miangas Airport (Indonesian: Bandar Udara Miangas [ˌbandar ˌudara miˈaŋas]) (IATA: IAX, ICAO: WAMS) is located on the island of Miangas, North Sulawesi. It is one of the most remote airports in Indonesia. The airport was built in 2012 with a construction investment of Rp 275 billion and opened on 12 March 2017. Wings Air opened its inaugural flight from Manado to Miangas Airport, with stopover at Melangguane Airport.

== Facilities ==
The airport has one runway designated as 03/21 with an asphalt surface measuring 1,400 by 30 metres which can accommodate planes such as ATR-72. It also has a 130 by 65 metres apron sufficient for operating three aircraft at the same time. This airport also houses a 356 square metre terminal warehouse.

== Airlines and destinations ==
Airlines	Destinations
SAM Air	Melonguane, Tahuna
