= Taman Bung Karno Airport =

Domestic airport in North Sulawesi, Indonesia

Taman Bung Karno Airport Bandar Udara Taman Bung Karno
- IATA: BRG; ICAO: WAMO

Summary
- Airport type: Public
- Serves: Siau Tagulandang Biaro Islands Regency
- Location: Siau Timur Selatan, Siau Tagulandang Biaro Islands Regency, North Sulawesi, Indonesia
- Coordinates: 02°38′59.0″N 125°25′25.5″E
- Interactive map of Taman Bung Karno Airport

Runways
Direction	Length		Surface
Direction	m	ft	Surface
	1,400	4,600	Asphalt

Taman Bung Karno Airport (IATA: BRG, ICAO: WAMO) is a domestic airport located in Siau Timur Selatan, Siau Tagulandang Biaro Islands Regency, North Sulawesi, Indonesia. Construction began in 2013 and the airport was inaugurated on 26 March 2024 by President Joko Widodo.

== Facility ==
This airport has one runway with a length of 1,400 metres (4,600 ft) and width of 30 metres (98 ft) and serves ATR 72 aircraft. The passenger terminal is 993 square metres (10,690 sq ft) and is equipped to handle approximately 27,000 passengers per year.

== Airlines and destinations ==
Airlines	Destinations	Refs.
SAM Air	Manado, Tahuna	
Susi Air	Manado, Tahuna	
