= Miangas =

Island in Indonesia

Native name: Pulau Miangas
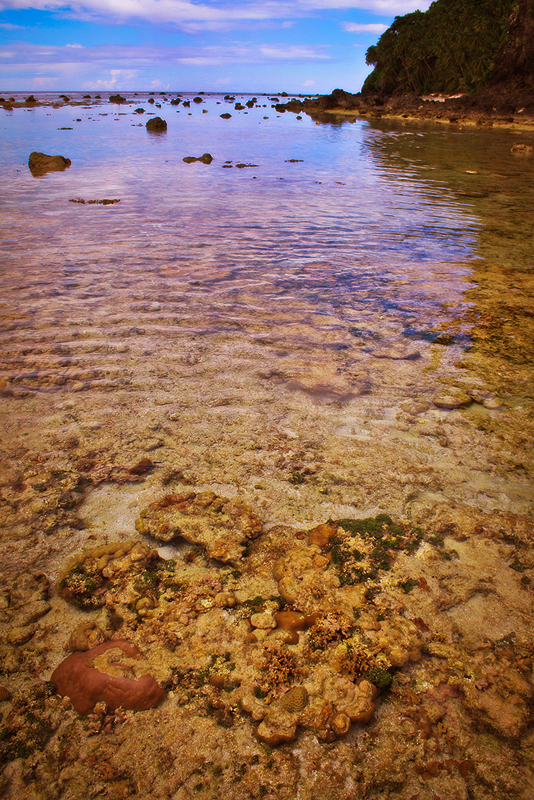
- Wolo Beach on Miangas

- Location within Indonesia

Geography
- Location: near Mindanao, Philippines, Southeast Asia
- Coordinates: 5.56308°N 126.58922°E
- Archipelago: Talaud Islands
- Area: 3.15 km^{2} (1.22 sq mi)
- Length: 3 km (1.9 mi)23
- Width: 1.2 km (0.75 mi)23
- Highest elevation: 111 m (364 ft)
- Highest point: Gunung Batu

Administration
- Indonesia
- Province: North Sulawesi
- Regency: Talaud Islands

Demographics
- Population: 816 (mid 2022 estimate)
- Pop. density: 259/km^{2} (671/sq mi)

Additional information
- Time zone: ICST (UTC+8)

Miangas or Palmas is the northernmost island of North Sulawesi, Indonesia and one of 92 officially listed outlying islands of Indonesia.

It is one of the Island in Indonesia where Tagalog language of the Philippinesis widespread spoken.

== Etymology ==
Miangas means "exposed to piracy", because pirates from Mindanao used to visit the island. In the Sasahara language, (Note: Sasahara language or sea language is a language that is used by Sangir people while sailing.) the island is called Tinonda (Minahasan: Poilaten), meaning "people who live separated from the main archipelago" and "our island", respectively. During the 16th century, the island was named in Spanish as Isla de las Palmas, and in Portuguese Ilha de Palmeiras.

== History ==
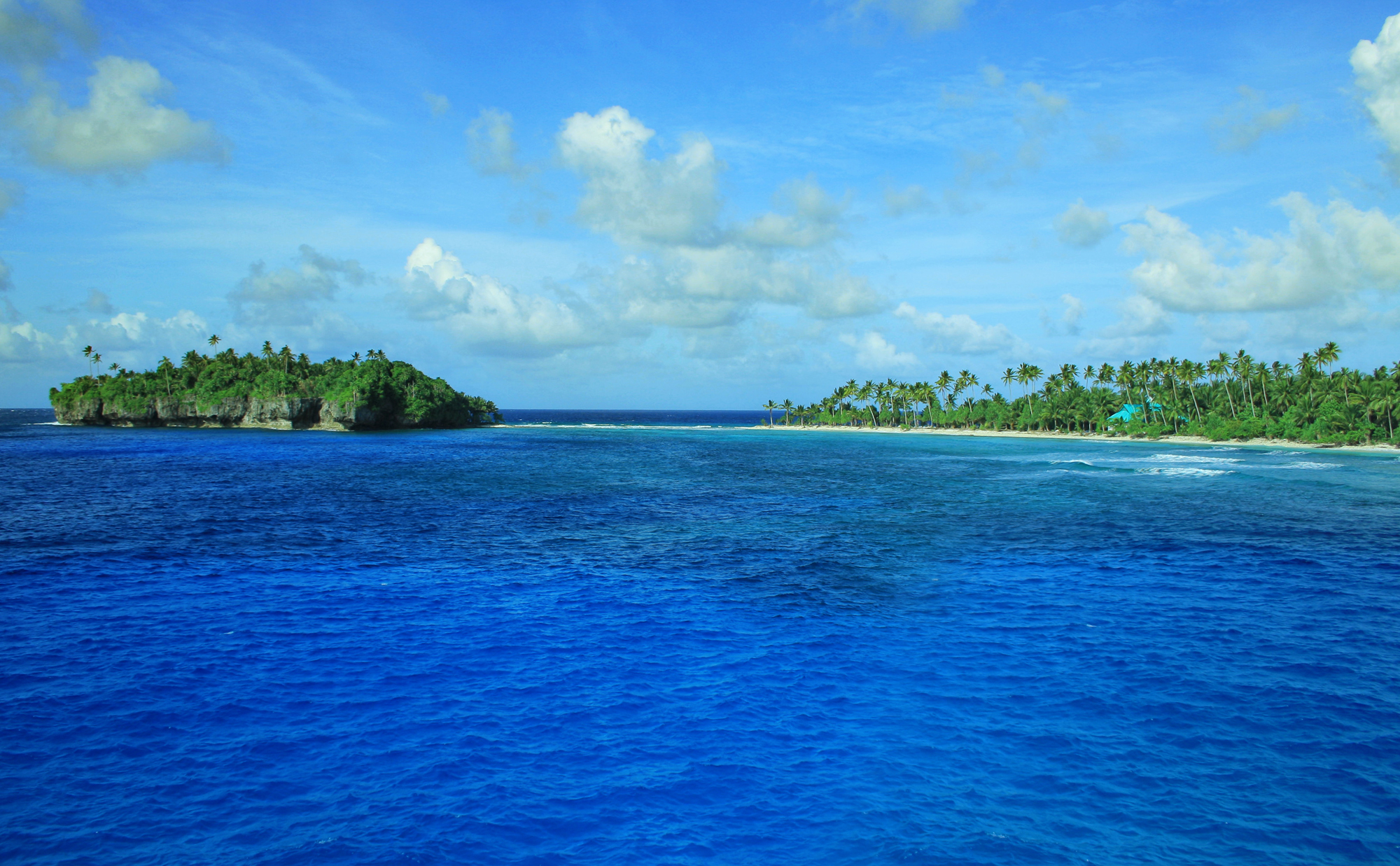
Tanjung Bora in Miangas

According to local tradition, there were a number of kingdoms in the area. Sangir, Talaud and Sitaro belonged to two kingdoms, Tabukan and Kalongan. To justify their sovereignty over Miangas, the Dutch argued that the island had been under the domination of the princes of Sangir.

=== Early modern era ===
In October 1526, Garcia Jofre de Loaísa, Spanish sailor and researcher, was the first European to visit the island.

The island was used as a defense site by Talaud people when under attack from the Sulu Sultanate.

The island was affected by an outbreak of cholera in 1885, causing hundreds of the inhabitants to move to Karakelang Island.

In 1895, E. J. Jellesma, Oud-resident of Manado, visited Miangas to praise the residents and kapiten laut for rejecting the Spanish flag. Jellesma gave them a medal and a Dutch flag. With Jellesma was Pastor Kroll, who baptized 254 residents as Protestants. After Jellesma's visit, a Tahuna assistant resident and Pastor Pannings visited the island in April and October 1909.

=== Island of Palmas Case ===
According to the Treaty of Paris, the Philippines area was all areas within a large geographic box. Miangas lay inside the southern boundary of the box. On 21 January 1906, General Leonard Wood, Governor of Moro Province, officially visited the island for the first time. He found the Dutch flag was flying there and that the island was claimed as part of the Dutch East Indies. When Wood returned to Zamboanga, he reported it to the United States Military Secretary, on 26 January. The United States government referred the matter to the Netherlands through their embassy in The Hague on 31 March. On 17 October the Netherlands Foreign Ministry responded with reasons why the island was included in the Dutch East Indies. On 23 January 1925 the Netherlands and the United States brought the case to the Permanent Court of Arbitration, under sole arbitrator Max Huber of Switzerland. On 4 April 1928 Huber decided that the island "forms in its entirety a part of Netherlands territory", in favour of the Dutch argument that it exercised sovereignty from 1677, or possibly from 1648, out of conventions entered into with native princes on Sangi.

=== After Indonesian independence ===
In 1956, Indonesia and the Philippines signed an agreement to allow border residents in Sangihe, Talaud, Nunukan, Balut, and Sarangani who had a laissez-passer to cross the border. In 1965, an implementation agreement designated Marore, Miangas, Mabila, and Balut as checkpoints.

In 1972, the island was hit by a tsunami, 90 households were moved to Bolaang-Mongondow Regency as a result.

In 2005, Indonesia refused a shipping line from Miangas to Davao. In the same year, Miangas village secretary Jhonlyi Awala died after being beaten by Miangas chief of police. Protesters lowered the Indonesian flag and raised the Philippine flag, citing neglect of the island. Talaud regent arrived to de-escalate the situation.

In 2009, Indonesia said the Philippine Tourism Authority published a map which included Miangas into the Philippines' territory, but suggested the map was drawn by a private company that was not aware of official borders, as both countries signed an extradition treaty in 1976 which recognized Miangas as Indonesia's territory.

In 2009, a monument was built and inaugurated on the island by Commander of the Armed Forces Djoko Santoso to commemorate Santiago who defended the island from the Dutch.

In 2011, Miangas could be reached by larger ships operated by Pelni.

In 2014, Indonesia and the Philippines concluded negotiations over maritime borders, with the waters surrounding Miangas recognized as part of Indonesia.

Miangas Airport was inaugurated by President Joko Widodo. The inaugural flight served this airport several months later in 2017. A flight from Manado Airport serves the island once a week. The flight, operated by Wings Air, lands at Miangas Airport every Sunday.

== Languages ==
The primarily languages of Miangas are Indonesian and the Talaud dialect, but also Tagalog is also commonly spoken as the Island is near at Mindanao, Philippines other languages are:

- Cebuano
- Other Visayan languages too

== Geography ==
Miangas is located 521 km (324 mi) from Manado, the capital of North Sulawesi and 198 km (123 mi) from Davao City in the Philippines. It also lies 87 km (54 mi) southeast of Mindanao. It is 3 km (2 mi) long and 1.2 km (3/4 mi) wide, with an area of 3.15 km^{2}. Miangas, which lies to the north of the Nanusa Islands, forms a separate district within the Talaud Islands Regency. The island is mainly lowland, about 1.5 metres above sea level. The highest point, called Gunung Batu, is 111 metres high, located in the northeast part of the island. This area is covered with coconut palm. In the northeast corner of the island, there is a 46-metre-high (151 ft) cliff, with the northeast shore fringed by a 320 m (0.2 mi) reef.

== Transportation ==
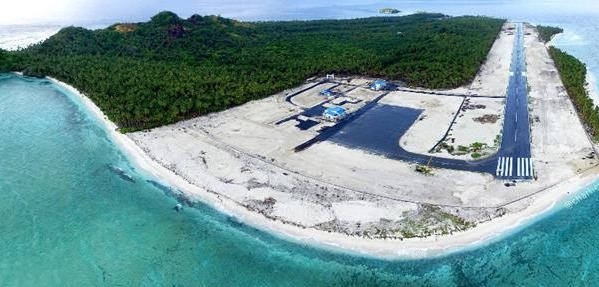
Miangas Airport

For transportation, Miangas inhabitants once relied on homemade sailboats. During the New Order, however, they started using motorboats. These are now the main source of transportation. Miangas Airport was inaugurated by President Joko Widodo. The inaugural flight served this airport several months later in 2017.

== Economy ==
Miangas inhabitants derive their main income from fishing. Women also weave mats from pandan leaves.

== Demography ==
As at the 2010 Census, the island's population was 728 people; the official estimate in mid-2022 was 816. Miangas inhabitants speak Indonesian and Talaud, the older generation usually also speak Tagalog.

The island has a police station and two military posts. There are also a market, a harbor office and a bank office.
