= 1925 North Tajima earthquake =

Earthquake struck Hyogo Prefecture, Japan on May 23, 1925

- 北但馬地震
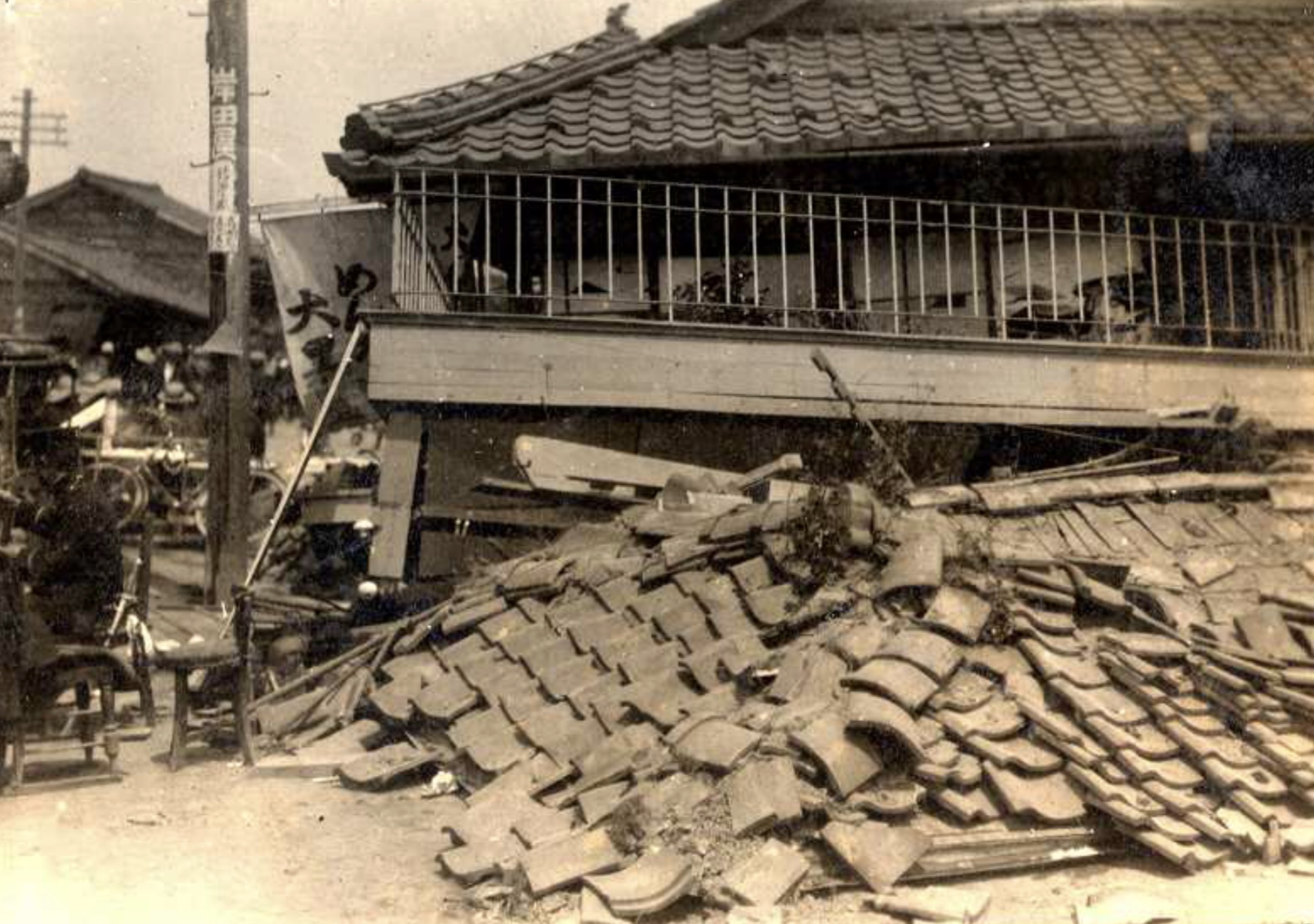

- Location within Hyōgo Prefecture
- UTC time: 1925-05-23 02:09:45
- ISC event: 910508
- USGS-ANSS: ComCat
- Local date: May 23, 1925
- Local time: 11.09
- Magnitude: 6.8 M_{L} 6.6 M_{s}
- Depth: 15 km (9.3 mi)
- Epicenter: 35°33.8′N 134°50.0′E
- Casualties: 428 dead

The 1925 North Tajima earthquake (Japanese: 北但馬地震) occurred on May 23, 1925 at Toyooka, Hyōgo in Japan.

== Overview ==
This earthquake's epicenter was in the Maruyama River estuary.

According to the Japanese government's official report, there were 428 fatalities, 1,016 injuries, 7,863 buildings destroyed, and 45,659 houses damaged by collapse or fire. This quake caused extensive damage to the town of Toyooka and the Maruyama River area.

Just before the shaking could be felt, a sound like a cannon was reportedly heard intermittently from the direction of the estuary near the Maruyama River. During the earthquake, the ground in the town of Tokyooka experienced strong seismic vibrations for 16 seconds.

As most of the buildings of the time were wooden, many of them were destroyed at once during the initial earthquake. In the fire that broke out subsequently, half of Toyooka was burned down, with many deaths resulting (a reported 8% of the town's population.) There were 272 deaths that were confirmed to have occurred in the Kinosaki area.

== See also ==
- List of earthquakes in 1925
- List of earthquakes in Japan
