= Garuda Indonesian Airways Flight 708 =

1967 aviation accident

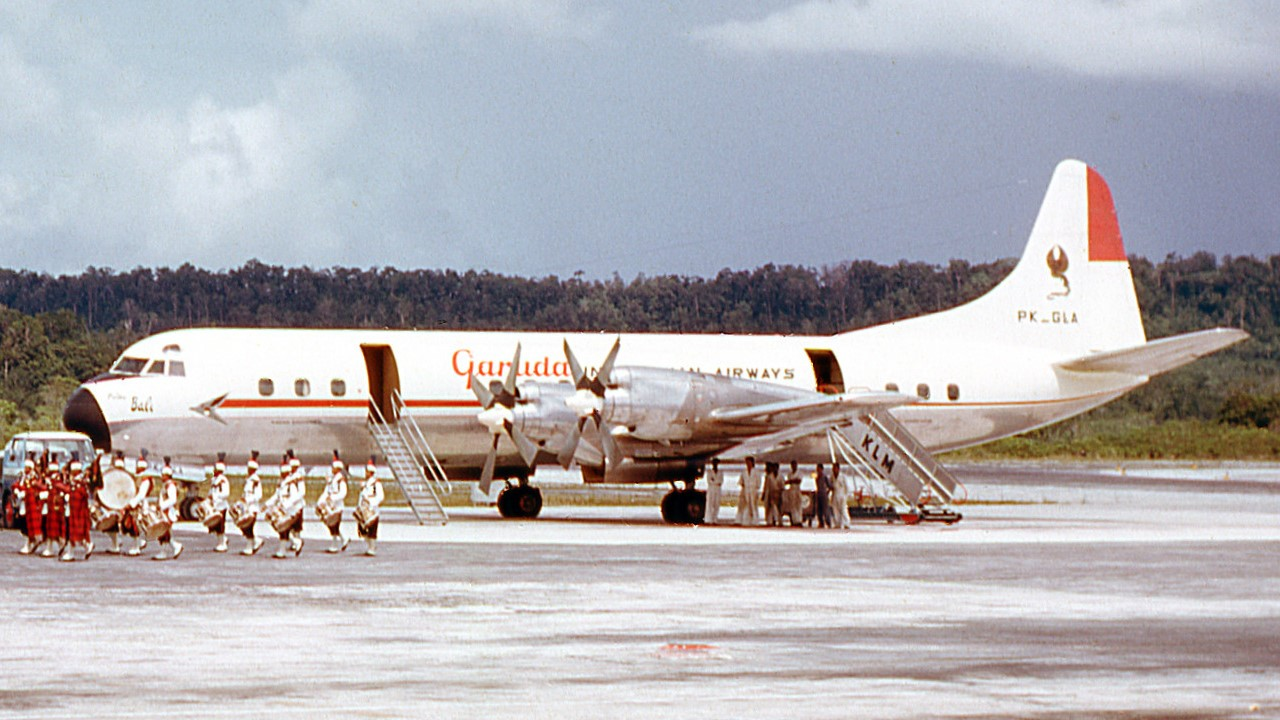
- PK-GLA, sister ship to the accident aircraft

Accident
- Date: 16 February 1967
- Summary: Crashed short of runway in poor weather due to pilot error
- Site: Mapanget Airport, Manado, Indonesia; 1.56°N 124.93°E

Aircraft
- Aircraft type: Lockheed L-188C Electra
- Aircraft name: Tjandi Borobudur
- Operator: Garuda Indonesian Airways
- Registration: PK-GLB
- Flight origin: Kemayoran Airport, Jakarta
- 1st stopover: Juanda Airport, Surabaya
- Last stopover: Mandai Airport, Makassar
- Destination: Mapanget Airport, Manado
- Occupants: 92
- Passengers: 84
- Crew: 8
- Fatalities: 22
- Injuries: 69
- Survivors: 70

Garuda Indonesian Airways Flight 708 (GA708/GIA708) was a scheduled domestic passenger flight in Indonesia by Garuda Indonesian Airways (now Garuda Indonesia) from Jakarta to Manado, with stopovers in Surabaya and Makassar. On 16 February 1967, while operating the last segment of the flight from Makassar to Manado, the Lockheed L-188C Electra airliner crashed on landing at Mapanget Airport in Manado, killing 22 out of 84 passengers and eight crew on board.

== Aircraft ==
The accident aircraft was a Lockheed L-188C Electra airliner with manufacturer serial number 2021, line number 169, registration PK-GLB. The airline took delivery of the aircraft in January 1961. The aircraft performed its recent inspection on 13 November 1966 with a valid airworthiness certificate until 23 June 1967. At the time of the accident, the aircraft had accumulated 12,359 flight hours.

== Flight and crash ==
Flight 708 departed Jakarta for a flight to Manado via Surabaya and Makassar. On the second leg of the flight bad weather at Makassar forced the crew to return to Surabaya. The flight continued the next day to Makassar and on to Manado. The weather at Manado was cloud base at 900 feet and 2 km visibility. An approach to runway 18 was made, but after passing a hill 200 feet above runway elevation and 2,720 feet short of the threshold, the pilot realized he was too high and left of the centerline. The nose was lowered and the aircraft banked right to intercept the glide path. The speed decreased below the 125 knots target threshold speed and the aircraft, still banked to the right, landed heavily 156 feet short of the runway threshold. The undercarriage collapsed and the aircraft skidded and caught fire.

== Crew ==
The flight had four cabin crew and four cockpit crew that consisted of a captain, a first officer, a flight engineer, and a radio operator.

- The 36-year-old captain held an airline transport pilot license with a type rating to fly the Lockheed L-188C Electra. He had accumulated 8,054 flight hours, including 718 on the Electra. In the 90 days before the accident, he had flown for 205 hours, including 150 on the Electra. He performed a proficiency check to fly the type on 26 November 1966 and passed a health check on 1 December 1966. In addition, he was the only pilot on the flight to have the experience to land the Electra in Manado.
- The 36-year-old first officer also held an airline transport pilot license with a type rating to fly the Lockheed L-188C Electra. He had accumulated 8,336 flight hours, including 505 on the Electra. He passed a health check on 3 October 1966.
- The 28-year-old flight engineer held a flight engineer license with a type rating to fly on the Lockheed L-188C Electra and the Convair CV-340/440. He passed a health check on 25 July 1966.
- The 36-year-old radio operator held a radiotelephony license issued on 22 November 1960. He passed a health check on 25 July 1966.

== Probable cause ==
The probable cause of the accident was determined to be an awkward landing technique resulting in an excessive rate of sink on touchdown. Among the contributing factors were the uneven pavement of the runway and marginal weather at time of the landing.
