= Talaud Islands Regency =

Regency in North Sulawesi, Indonesia

Talaud Islands Regency Kabupaten Kepulauan Talaud
- Regency
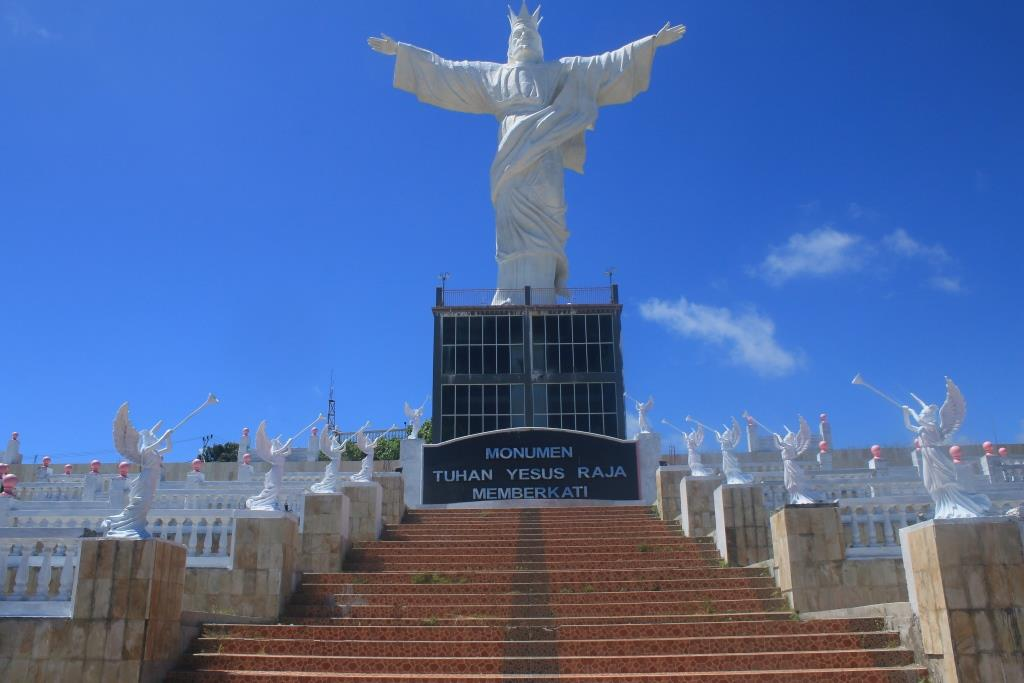
- The Tuhan Yesus Raja Memberkati (Lord Jesus the King Blesses) monument

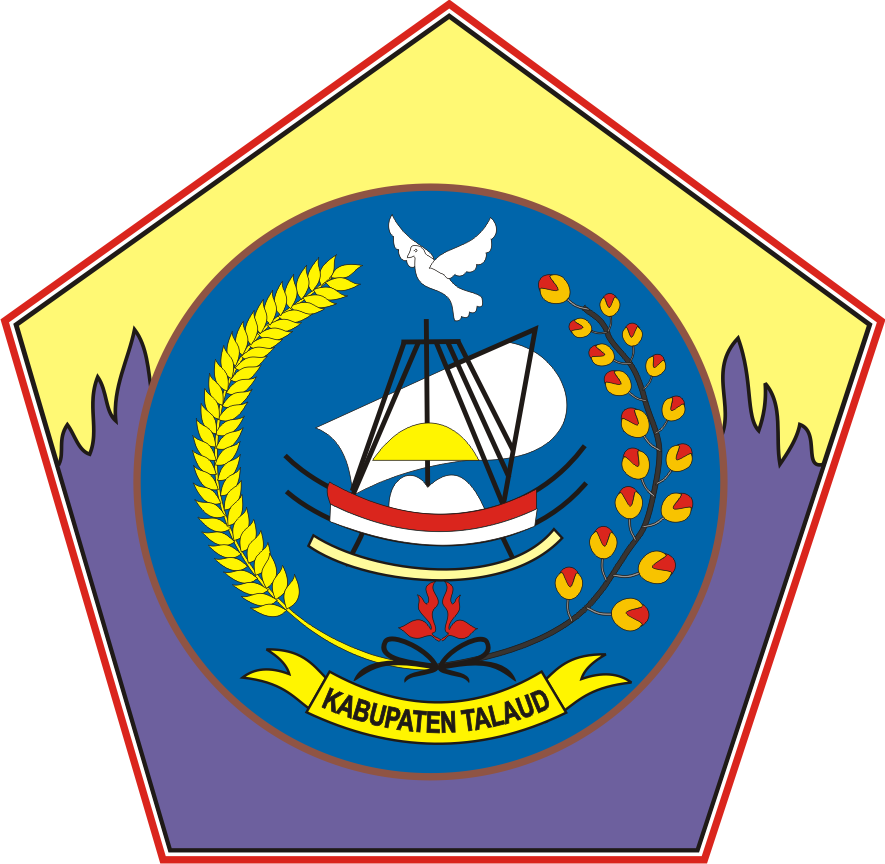
- Seal

- Location within North Sulawesi

- Location in Sulawesi and Indonesia Talaud Islands Regency (Indonesia)
- Coordinates: 4.31178°N 126.78085°E
- Country: Indonesia
- Province: North Sulawesi
- Regency seat: Melonguane

Government
  - Regent: Fransiscus Engelbert Manumpil (acting)
  - Vice Regent: Vacant

Area
  - Total: 1,251.02 km^{2} (483.02 sq mi)
- Lowest elevation: 0 m (0 ft)

Population (mid 2025 estimate)
  - Total: 99,280
  - Density: 79.36/km^{2} (205.5/sq mi)
- Time zone: UTC+8 (ICST)
- Area code: (+62) 433
- HDI (2019): ▲0.689 (Medium)
- Website: talaudkab.go.id

The Talaud Islands Regency (Indonesian: Kabupaten Kepulauan Talaud) is a regency of North Sulawesi province, Indonesia. The Talaud Islands form an archipelago situated to the northeast of the Minahasa Peninsula, with a land area of 1,251.02 km^{2}. It had a population of 83,434 at the 2010 Census, increasing to 94,521 at the 2020 Census; the official estimate as of mid 2025 was 99,280 (comprising 50,990 males and 48,290 females).

The largest island is Karakelong, on which lies the regency seat in the town of Melonguane. To its south lie the islands of Salibabu and Kabaruan, while the Nanusa group of 7 small islands lies to the northeast of Karakelong, and Miangas island is situated midway between Karakelong and the Philippines. It is one of the three regencies to the north of North Sulawesi that are located between Sulawesi and the Philippines, along with the Sitaro Islands Regency and Sangihe Islands Regency; originally these formed a single regency, but on 10 April 2002 this was split into separate regencies for the Sangihe Islands and for the Talaud Islands.

The island of Miangas is the most northerly in the regency and is widely regarded as the northernmost point of Indonesia. As a result, it is often referenced to describe the territorial integrity of Indonesia in various patriotic statements and songs together with Sabang, Merauke, and Rote Island (respectively the most western, most eastern and most southern points in Indonesia).

== History ==
The islands were known as Maleon, Sinduane, Tamarongge, Batunampato, and Tinonda. Human settlements in the region have been present since prehistoric times, as shown by several artifacts of hand axe and chopper from 6,000 BC. There were also remains of chinaware, suggesting there had been continuous trading activity between the natives of the islands and the outside world.

It was thought that inhabitants of the island originated from Southern Philippines especially Mindanao and also traders from Ternate.

== Geography ==
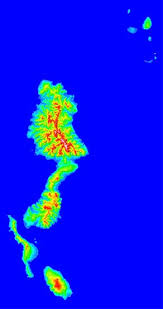
A Topographical Map of the Islands (Note: The islands of the Talaud group are: (ordered from South to North): Kabaruang Island * Salibabu Island * Sara Besar Island (off Salibabu's east coast) * Nusa Dolong and Nusa Topor (off Karakelong's central west coast) * Karakelong Island * the Nanusa Islands: (ordered S to N) Kakalotan Island, Kakarotan Island, Intata Island, Magupu Island, Karatung Island, Merampit Island (largest) and Garat Island * Miangas (not visible on map))

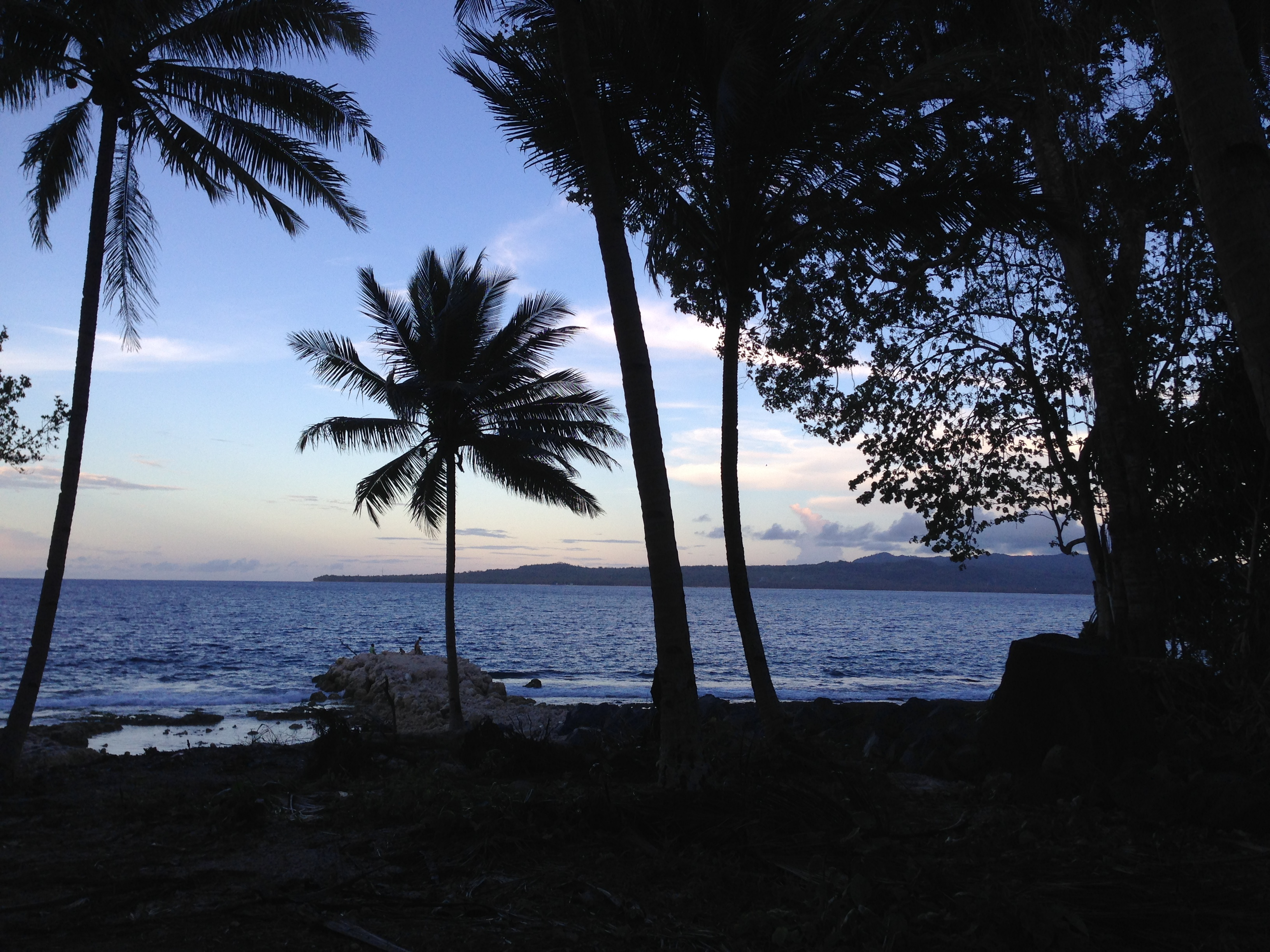
Bitunuris Beach, near Bitunuris Village, Salibabu

Grouping Talaud with the Sangihe Islands and Sitaro regencies, there are 77 islands in the Talaud-Sangihe archipelagos, of which 56 are inhabited. Compared with the Sangihe archipelago, the islands are low-lying and forested, with hills rising to 2,231 feet (680 metres). The coast of Karakelong Island is steep except on the southern shore, which is fringed by a wide reef.

The region is regularly rocked by large earthquakes and volcanic eruptions, as the Molucca Sea Plate is being consumed in both directions. A notable earthquake was the 2009 Talaud Islands earthquake, which was felt in the Philippines as well.

== Governance ==
The Regency is divided into nineteen districts (kecamatan), tabulated below with their areas and their populations at the 2010 Census and 2020 Census, together with the official estimates as of mid 2025. The table also includes the locations of the district administrative centres, the number of administrative villages in each district (totaling 142 rural desa and 11 urban kelurahan), and its postcode.

List of districts of Talaud Islands Regency
Kode Wilayah	Name of District (kecamatan)	Area in km^{2}	Pop'n Census 2010	Pop'n Census 2020	Pop'n estimate mid 2025	Admin Centre	No. of villages	Post code
71.04.06	Kabaruan	66.03	5,472	5,860	6,000	Mangaran	12	95873
71.04.09	Damau (formerly East Kabaruan)	49.58	4,127	4,530	4,700	Damau	8	95872
	Total Kabaruan; Island	115.61	9,599	10,390	10,700		20	
71.04.01	Lirung	31.11	6,137	6,330	6,300	Lirung	7 ^{(a)}	95875
71.04.11	Salibabu	21.80	5,566	6,330	6,700	Salibabu	6	95871
71.04.12	Kalongan	24.81	3,060	3,460	3,600	Kalongan	5	95874
71.04.17	Moronge	20.35	3,505	3,880	4,000	Moronge	6	95870
	Total Salibabu; Island	98.07	18,268	20,000	20,600		24	
71.04.07	Melonguane	77.39	10,463	11,920	12,500	Melonguane	13 ^{(b)}	95885
71.04.16	East Melonguane	48.35	2,964	3,750	4,200	Bowombaru	6	95886
71.04.02	Beo	70.93	5,521	5,980	6,200	Beo	6 ^{(c)}	95876
71.04.14	North Beo	144.85	3,609	4,350	4,700	Lobbo	8 ^{(d)}	95881
71.04.18	South Beo	63.87	3,475	3,960	4,200	Tarohan	7	95877
71.04.03	Rainis	80.68	5,959	7,180	7,800	Rainis	11	95880
71.04.10	Tampan' Amma	124.18	5,497	6,450	6,900	Dapalan	11	95882
71.04.15	Pulutan	58.81	1,953	2,350	2,500	Pulutan	5	95878
71.04.04	Essang	94.76	3,397	3,870	4,100	Essang	8	95883
71.04.19	South Essang	75.02	3,198	3,680	3,900	Sambuara	9	95887
71.04.08	Gemeh	137.71	5,470	6,430	6,900	Gemeh	15	95888
	Total Karakelong; Island	976.55	51,506	59,920	63,800		99	
71.04.05	Nanusa ^{(e)}	58.40	3,333	3,400	3,400	Karatung	9	95884
71.04.13	Miangas	2.39	728	810	800	Miangas	1	95889
	Total Regency	1,251.02	83,434	94,520	99,280		153	

Notes: (a) including 3 kelurahan - Lirung, Lirung I and Lirung Matane. (b) including 3 kelurahan - Melonguane, Melonguane Barat and Melonguane Timur.
(c) including 3 kelurahan - Beo, Beo Barat and Beo Timur. (d) including 2 kelurahan - Makatara and Makatara Timur. (e) comprising the 7 Nanusa Islands.

== Economy ==
Talaud Islands Regency is one of the outermost regions in Indonesia located in North Sulawesi Province, directly bordering the Philippines. Its strategic location provides great potential for economic growth, especially in the marine and fisheries sector. This potential is supported by abundant marine natural resources, ranging from capture fisheries, fish farming, to marine tourism.

=== Fishing ===
The fisheries sector is the main pillar of the Talaud economy, with the majority of the population working as fishermen. The Talaud Sea is rich in various types of fish such as tuna, skipjack, and reef fish.

=== Tourism ===
The Talaud Islands also have quite large tourism potential, especially marine tourism such as diving, snorkeling, and beach tourism. The beauty of the underwater world and the richness of marine life are the main attractions for domestic and international tourists. However, the lack of transportation facilities and tourism promotion are challenges that need to be overcome to encourage this sector as a source of regional income.

=== Agriculture ===
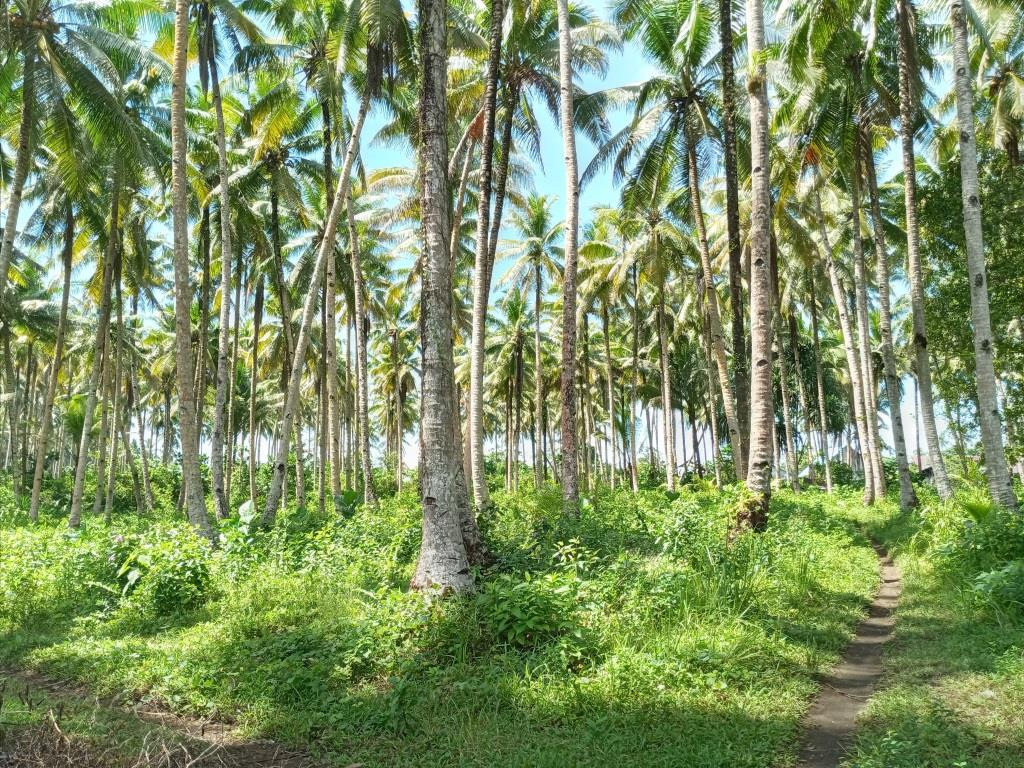
A coconut plantation in Tampan'amma District, Talaud Islands Regency; coconut is among the major cash crops in the regency.

In addition to the maritime sector, the agricultural and plantation sectors also play an important role in the Talaud economy. Food crops such as coconut, corn, and bananas are the main commodities. Coconuts in particular are exported in the form of copra and coconut oil. However, challenges in this sector include climate change, access to modern agricultural technology, and inadequate infrastructure.

== Demography ==
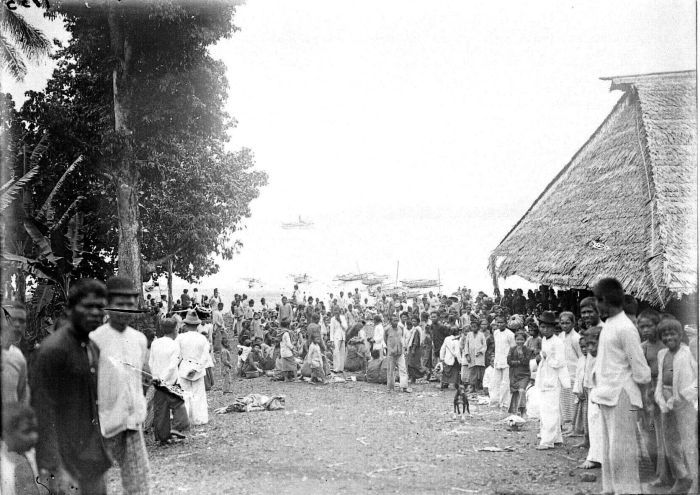
Market in Siaoe, Talaud Islands (Note: Photo was taken during the Siboga Expedition of 1899-1900.)

The population of the Talaud Islands was 99,280 according to the mid 2025 official estimates. The total population of the Talaud, Sangihe and Sitaro Islands combined was 308,662 in mid 2025.

=== Ethnicities ===
The population of the Talaud Islands Regency is mostly from the Talaud ethnic group, which is the indigenous ethnic group in this region. The Talaud ethnic group has a distinctive language and culture, with the Talaud language as a regional language that is still used in everyday life, especially in rural areas and in traditional activities. They have strong cultural ties, with various traditions and traditional ceremonies still practiced, such as harvest celebrations and sea rituals.

In addition to the Talaud ethnic group, there is also the presence of the Sangir ethnic group, who come from the Sangihe Islands, a neighboring region in North Sulawesi. The Sangir ethnic group has cultural and linguistic similarities with the Talaud, so that these two ethnic groups can live side by side in harmony. They are also involved in the same economic activities, such as agriculture and fisheries.

In addition to local ethnic groups, there are a number of immigrant tribes such as Minahasa, Bugis, Makassar, Javanese, as well as migrants from Ternate and Tidore. The presence of these immigrants is related to trade, transmigration, or work in the government and education sectors. Although their numbers are relatively small, their presence has enriched the ethnic diversity in the Talaud Islands Regency.

The regency also has historical ties with the Southern Philippines, especially the Mindanao region. During the colonial period, the Maluku Islands was known as the "Spice Islands," where various valuable spices such as cloves, nutmeg, and pepper were produced. Ships from the Philippines often stopped in Talaud to conduct trade these goods, as well as local seafood and agricultural products. Talaud served as an important stopping point for sailors to refuel and obtain supplies. Geographical proximity has led to long-standing interactions between the two regions, and although the number of migrants from the Philippines is insignificant, there are a number of Filipinos who have assimilated into the local Talaud population.

=== Religion ===
Protestant Christianity is the majority religion of the islands. There is a significant Muslim minority community also.

== Biodiversity ==
The Talaud Islands are a hotspot of endemism and zoological diversity, and are situated in the Sulawesi lowland rain forests ecoregion.

Endemic mammals include the endangered Talaud flying fox (Acerodon humilis), the critically endangered Talaud bear cuscus (Ailurops melanotis), the endangered Short-tailed Talaud mosaic-tailed rat (Melomys caurinus), and the endangered Long-tailed Talaud mosaic-tailed rat (Melomys talaudium). Birds endemic to the Talaud Islands include the vulnerable Talaud bush-hen (Amaurornis magnirostris), the endangered Talaud rail (Gymnocrex talaudensis), the near-threatened Talaud kingfisher (Todiramphus enigma), and the vulnerable Red-and-blue lory (Eos histrio), which formerly lived across the Talaud and Sangihe islands, now restricted only to Karakelang. The Talaud black birdwing (Troides dohertyi) is a butterfly endemic to the Sangihe and Talaud Islands.

Sangihe and Talaud were largely deforested by 1920, and there is minimal natural forest remaining on these islands. A survey has been proposed to determine appropriate locations for additional protected areas around the remaining forest (Stattersfield et al. 1998). There is a Wildlife Reserve on Karakelong [246.69 km^{2} (95.25 miles^{2})].

== Infrastructure ==
=== Education ===
There are 74 kindergartens, 117 elementary schools, 43 junior high schools, and 24 senior high schools, in addition of 13 vocational high schools. Of the 24 senior high schools, five of them are Christian senior high schools (SMAK) which are administered by the Ministry of Religious Affairs instead of the Ministry of Education, Culture, Research, and Technology.

There's only one college in the regency, Rajawali Computer Science College which is private. It was established after the MoU between the regency government and IPB University in 2006. The main campus was previously located in a temporary location in Melonguane town, but later relocated to town of Beo in 2011 where the newly built campus complex was located.

=== Healthcare ===
There are two main hospitals, 42 Puskesmas, and six registered pharmacies in the regency; 17 Puskesmas have inpatient care. There are also 153 healthcare centers in the regency as of 2020. Talaud Regional Hospital, which is the main hospital of the regency, is located at the town of Melonguane and classified by Ministry of Health as C-class hospital. The other hospital is located at town of Gemeh, is RSB Gemeh Talaud which has smaller building and classified as D-class hospital.

=== Transportation ===
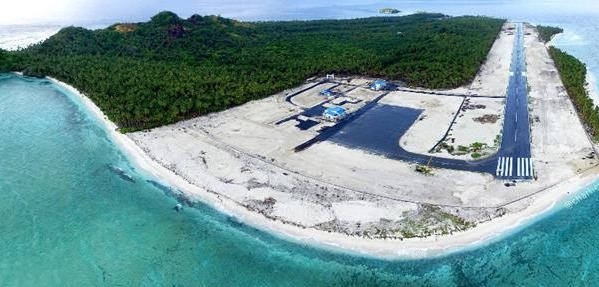
Miangas airport, serving the northernmost Indonesian island of Miangas

Total length of road in the regency as of 2020 was 470.771 kilometers out of which 265.44 kilometers are sealed with asphalt and 38.147 kilometers were gravel surface. Almost half of the roads are under the authority of the regency government, while the other half are under the authority of the province. Only 66.05 kilometers are under direct authority of the central government. The main port in the regency is Melonguane Port, located in the town of Melonguane. It is connected to other smaller ports scattered around the regency as well as big ports in mainland Sulawesi by Sea Toll Program. In addition, the Melonguane Port also host an Indonesian Navy naval base.

The regency is mainly served by Melangguane Airport, which has regular flight to Manado. There's also recently built Miangas Airport serving the island of Miangas which has flights to Manado and also Melonguane. It is one of the most remote airports in Indonesia and was inaugurated by Joko Widodo in 2017. As of 2021, there's one proposed airport that would be built in Marampit, which has been approved by Ministry of National Development Planning.
