= Karakelang =

Island in Indonesia

- Location within Sulawesi

Geography
- Location: South East Asia
- Coordinates: 4°15′32″N 126°48′00″E
- Archipelago: Talaud Islands
- Area: 846 km^{2} (327 sq mi)

Administration
- Indonesia
- Province: North Sulawesi
- Largest settlement: Melonguane

Demographics
- Population: 62,900 (mid 2024 estimate)
- Pop. density: 74.35/km^{2} (192.57/sq mi)

Karakelang is the main island of the Talaud Islands north east of Sulawesi, Indonesia. Its area is 846 km^{2} (327 sq mi). It has a population of 51,506 at the 2010 Census and 59,920 at the 2020 Census; the official estimate as at mid 2024 was 62,900. Its largest town is Melonguane on the west coast, which serves as the administrative centre for the Talaud Islands Regency.
