= Melonguane =

- Location in North Sulawesi and Indonesia Melonguane (Indonesia)
- Coordinates: 4°0′16.3368″N 126°40′57.5688″E
- Country: Indonesia
- Province: North Sulawesi
- Regency: Talaud Islands Regency

Area
  - Total: 48.55 sq mi (125.74 km^{2})
- Elevation: 200 ft (61 m)

Population (2020 Census)
  - Total: 15,670
  - Density: 322.8/sq mi (124.6/km^{2})
- Time zone: UTC+8 (Indonesia Central Standard Time)

Melonguane is a town and district in Talaud Islands Regency in North Sulawesi province. It is the capital of the regency. Its population was 10,463 at the 2010 Census. The district was subsequently split in two, with a new East Melonguane district being created out of the eastern 38.5%. The areas and populations at the 2020 Census were as follows:

| Name | Area in km^{2} | Population Census 2020 |
|---|---|---|
| Melonguane | 77.39 | 11,920 |
| East Melonguane | 48.35 | 3,750 |
| Totals | 125.74 | 15,670 |

== Climate ==
Melonguane has a tropical rainforest climate (Af) with heavy to very heavy rainfall year-round.

Climate data for Melonguane
| Month | Jan | Feb | Mar | Apr | May | Jun | Jul | Aug | Sep | Oct | Nov | Dec | Year |
|---|---|---|---|---|---|---|---|---|---|---|---|---|---|
| Mean daily maximum °C (°F) | 30.3 (86.5) | 30.4 (86.7) | 30.7 (87.3) | 31.5 (88.7) | 31.1 (88.0) | 30.7 (87.3) | 30.4 (86.7) | 30.9 (87.6) | 31.2 (88.2) | 31.5 (88.7) | 31.3 (88.3) | 30.7 (87.3) | 30.9 (87.6) |
| Daily mean °C (°F) | 26.0 (78.8) | 26.0 (78.8) | 26.3 (79.3) | 26.9 (80.4) | 26.8 (80.2) | 26.5 (79.7) | 26.1 (79.0) | 26.5 (79.7) | 26.6 (79.9) | 26.9 (80.4) | 26.8 (80.2) | 26.4 (79.5) | 26.5 (79.7) |
| Mean daily minimum °C (°F) | 21.8 (71.2) | 21.7 (71.1) | 21.9 (71.4) | 22.4 (72.3) | 22.6 (72.7) | 22.3 (72.1) | 21.9 (71.4) | 22.2 (72.0) | 22.1 (71.8) | 22.3 (72.1) | 22.4 (72.3) | 22.2 (72.0) | 22.2 (71.9) |
| Average precipitation mm (inches) | 337 (13.3) | 210 (8.3) | 270 (10.6) | 239 (9.4) | 305 (12.0) | 315 (12.4) | 284 (11.2) | 211 (8.3) | 213 (8.4) | 245 (9.6) | 294 (11.6) | 312 (12.3) | 3,235 (127.4) |
Source: Climate-Data.org
