= Sam Ratulangi International Airport =

Airport serving Manado, North Sulawesi, Indonesia

Sam Ratulangi International Airport Bandar Udara Internasional Sam Ratulangi

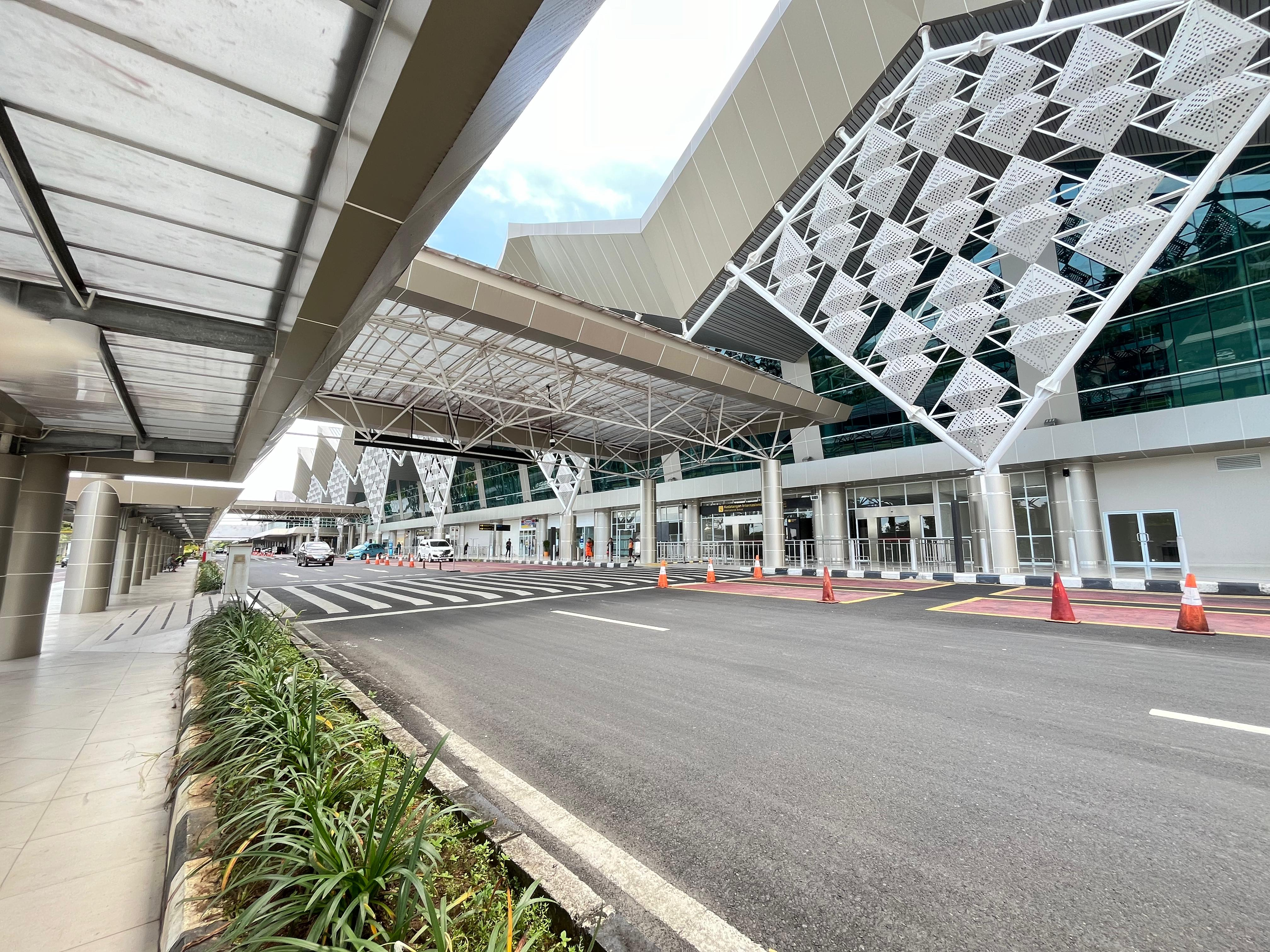
- IATA: MDC; ICAO: WAMM; WMO: 97014

Summary
- Airport type: Public / Military
- Owner: Government of Indonesia
- Operator: InJourney Airports
- Serves: Manado metropolitan area
- Location: Manado, North Sulawesi, Indonesia
- Opened: 1938; 88 years ago
- Operating base for: Lion Air; Wings Air
- Time zone: WITA (UTC+08:00)
- Elevation AMSL: 81 m (266 ft)
- Coordinates: 01°32′57″N 124°55′35″E
- Website: www.samratulangi-airport.com

Maps
- Sulawesi region in Indonesia

- Location of Airport in Manado, North Sulawesi, Indonesia MDC/WAMM (Sulawesi) MDC/WAMM (Southeast Asia) MDC/WAMM (Asia)

Runways
Direction	Length		Surface
Direction	m	ft	Surface
18/36	2,650	8,934	Asphalt

Statistics (2024)
- Passengers: 1,761,765 (▲4.9%)
- Cargo (tonnes): 16,504 (▲16.8%)
- Aircraft movements: 17,260 (▲4.0%)
- Source: DGCA

Sam Ratulangi International Airport (IATA: MDC, ICAO: WAMM) is an international airport located 13 kilometres (8.1 miles) north-east of Manado, the capital city of North Sulawesi, Indonesia. Sam Ratulangi Airport serves as the primary gateway to Manado and the North Sulawesi region. Named after Sam Ratulangi (1890-1949), a respected Minahasan educator, independence hero, and national figure, the airport is one of the major airports in Eastern Indonesia and plays a vital role in both domestic and international travel. It has been designated by the Ministry of Tourism and Culture of Indonesia as one of the country's 11 main entry points. The airport also serves as the main access point to Bunaken National Park, a renowned diving destination, and Likupang coastal area, one of Indonesia's super priority tourism destinations. Currently, it functions as an operational base for Lion Air, TransNusa, and Wings Air in northeastern Indonesia, with regular domestic flights to major cities including Jakarta, Makassar, Surabaya, and Denpasar, as well as scheduled international services to China, Singapore, and South Korea. It is the second-busiest airport in Sulawesi, after Sultan Hasanuddin International Airport in Makassar, and one of only three international airports on the island.

In addition to functioning as a commercial airport, Sam Ratulangi Airport also hosts Sam Ratulangi Air Force Base, a Type A airbase of the Indonesian Air Force, as well as a Type B naval airbase under the Indonesian Navy's Naval Aviation Center (Puspenerbal). The military facilities are located to the east of the passenger terminal, across the runway. Their strategic importance stems from the airport's proximity to the Indonesian–Philippines border.

== History ==
=== Colonial era and World War II ===
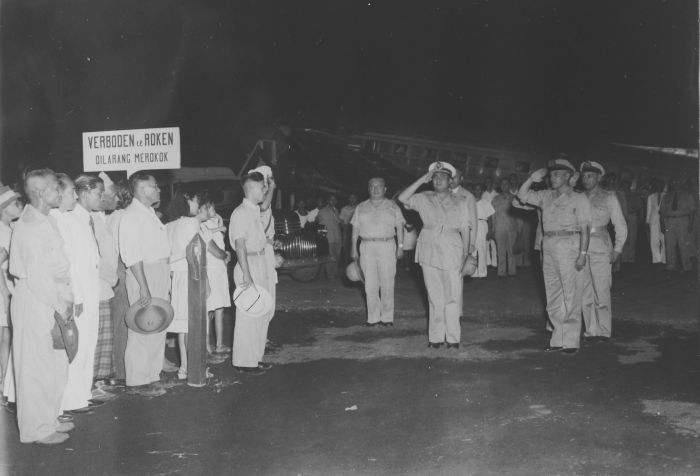
The Prime Minister of State of East Indonesia Ida Anak Agung Gde Agung at Mapanget Airfield in 1948

In 1938, anticipating the outbreak of World War II and the growing threat of Japanese expansion, the Dutch colonial government constructed three airfields in North Sulawesi: Langowan (also known as Kalawiran), Mapanget, and a seaplane base in Tasuka, on the shores of Lake Tondano. The Langowan and Mapanget airfields were intended for fighter aircraft operated by the Royal Netherlands East Indies Army Air Force (Militaire Luchtvaart van het KNIL or ML-KNIL), while the Tasuka base was designated for Dornier Do-24 amphibious aircraft. Lake Tondano also served as the headquarters of the Netherlands Naval Aviation Service (Marine Luchtvaart Dienst). In December 1941, as part of the opening phase of the Japanese invasion of the Dutch East Indies, the seaplane base at Lake Tondano was destroyed by Japanese Mitsubishi A6M2 Zero fighter aircraft of the Imperial Japanese Army Air Service.

To defend the Langowan and Mapanget airfields from Japanese attacks, the Dutch deployed the Manado Troop Command (Troepencommando Manado) under the leadership of Major B. F. A. Schilmoller. Despite these efforts, both airfields were captured by Japanese paratroopers on January 12, 1942, during the Battle of Manado. Following their capture, the Japanese converted Mapanget Airfield into a command base for military operations against Kendari in Southeast Sulawesi. It was later used as a staging point for air strikes in preparation for the invasion of Java. The runway at Mapanget was subsequently widened and extended to accommodate Mitsubishi G3M bomber aircraft. The Japanese also upgraded the airfield to support their wartime operations, employing forced laborers known as romusha, who were subjected to harsh and often inhumane conditions.

=== Permesta rebellion ===
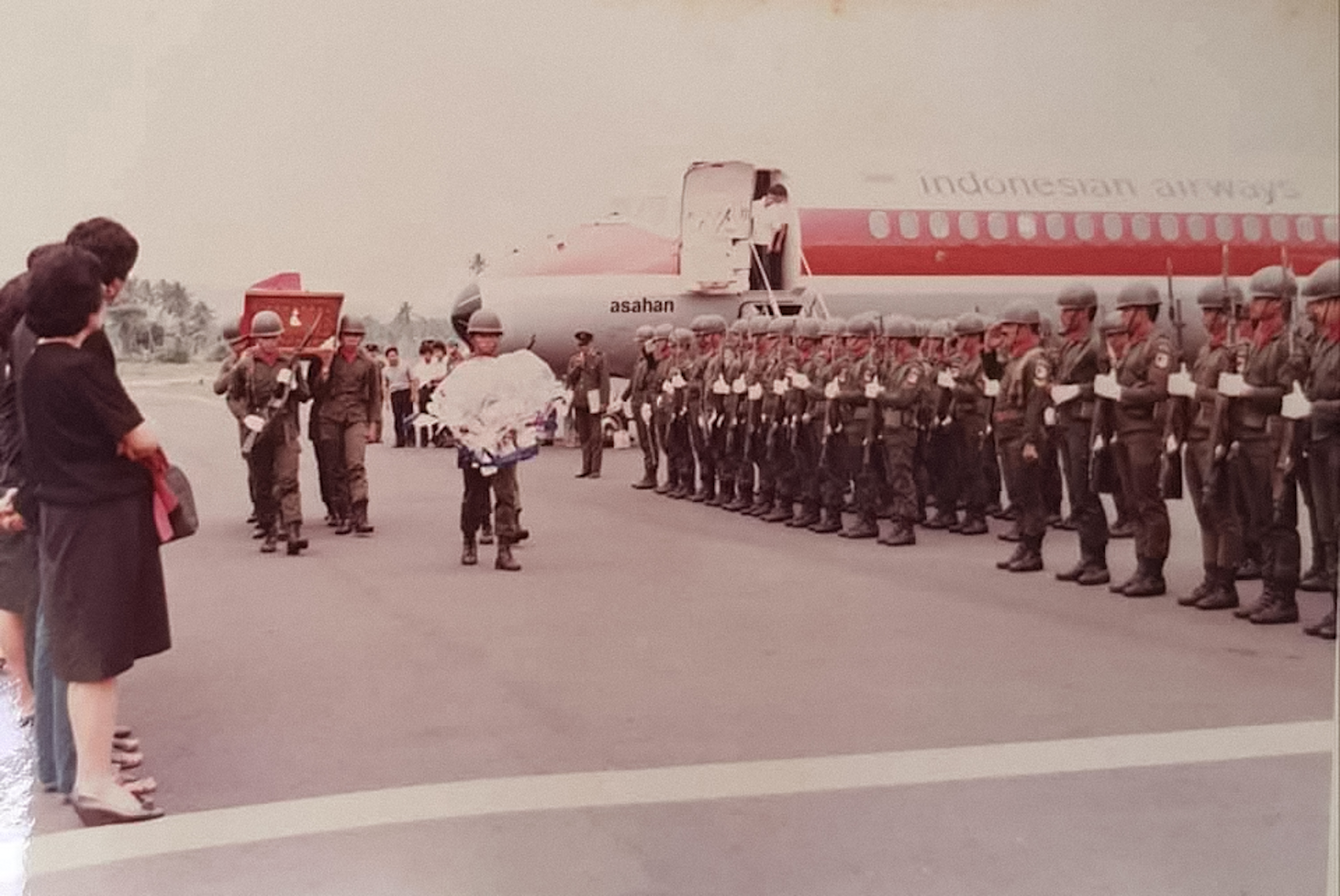
Military ceremony welcoming the body of Pet Tangkilisan, a member of the Indonesian Independence Committee (KIM), at Mapanget Airfield (1984)

In April 1958, Mapanget Airfield was seized by the Permesta rebels, with covert support from the CIA. Operating from this base, Permesta fighter aircraft launched an attack that destroyed the Langowan Airfield, which was under the control of the Indonesian Air Force (AURI). Mapanget subsequently became the headquarters of the Revolutionary Air Force (AUREV), Permesta's air wing. At its peak, AUREV operated eight to nine fighter aircraft flown by foreign pilots from the United States, the Philippines, and Taiwan. Among them was the notable American pilot Allen Pope, whose aircraft was later shot down by AURI forces over Ambon.

Mapanget Airfield served as the primary base for AUREV operations, from which airstrikes were launched against several cities including Balikpapan, Palu, and Ambon. On 15 May 1958, AURI launched retaliatory attacks on Permesta airbases in North Sulawesi, targeting both Mapanget and Kalawiran. At Mapanget, under the command of Leo Wattimena, AURI’s B-25 bombers and P-51 Mustang fighters carried out coordinated strikes—bombing the runway and strafing parked AUREV aircraft. A direct rocket hit on a PBY Catalina ignited a fire that destroyed the plane instantly. Following the attack, only one B-25 bomber and one P-51 fighter remained operational at Mapanget. Simultaneously, the attack on Kalawiran airfield destroyed two C-45 transport aircraft, reportedly sourced from Taiwan. On 9 June 1958, AURI returned to attack Mapanget Airfield. This time, P-51 fighters were deployed from Morotai, which had been reclaimed by the Indonesian military. However, the second assault was less effective; Mapanget’s anti-aircraft defenses had been significantly strengthened. Two AURI P-51s were shot down during the engagement, resulting in the death of one pilot.

After the airfield was recaptured by the Indonesian Air Force (AURI), it was renamed Tugiman Airfield in honor of Sergeant Major Tugiman, who was killed during the battle to reclaim Mapanget from the Permesta rebels. In the following years, the name reverted to Mapanget Airfield. It was later renamed A. A. Maramis Airfield, in honor of Alexander Andries Maramis, a former Indonesian minister from North Sulawesi and a national hero of Indonesia. Eventually, the airfield received its current name, Sam Ratulangi Airport, in honor of Dr. Sam Ratulangi—a prominent Minahasan educator, journalist, politician, and also a national hero from North Sulawesi. He was a member of the committee that drafted and ratified the Constitution of Indonesia and served as the first Governor of Sulawesi.

=== Contemporary era ===
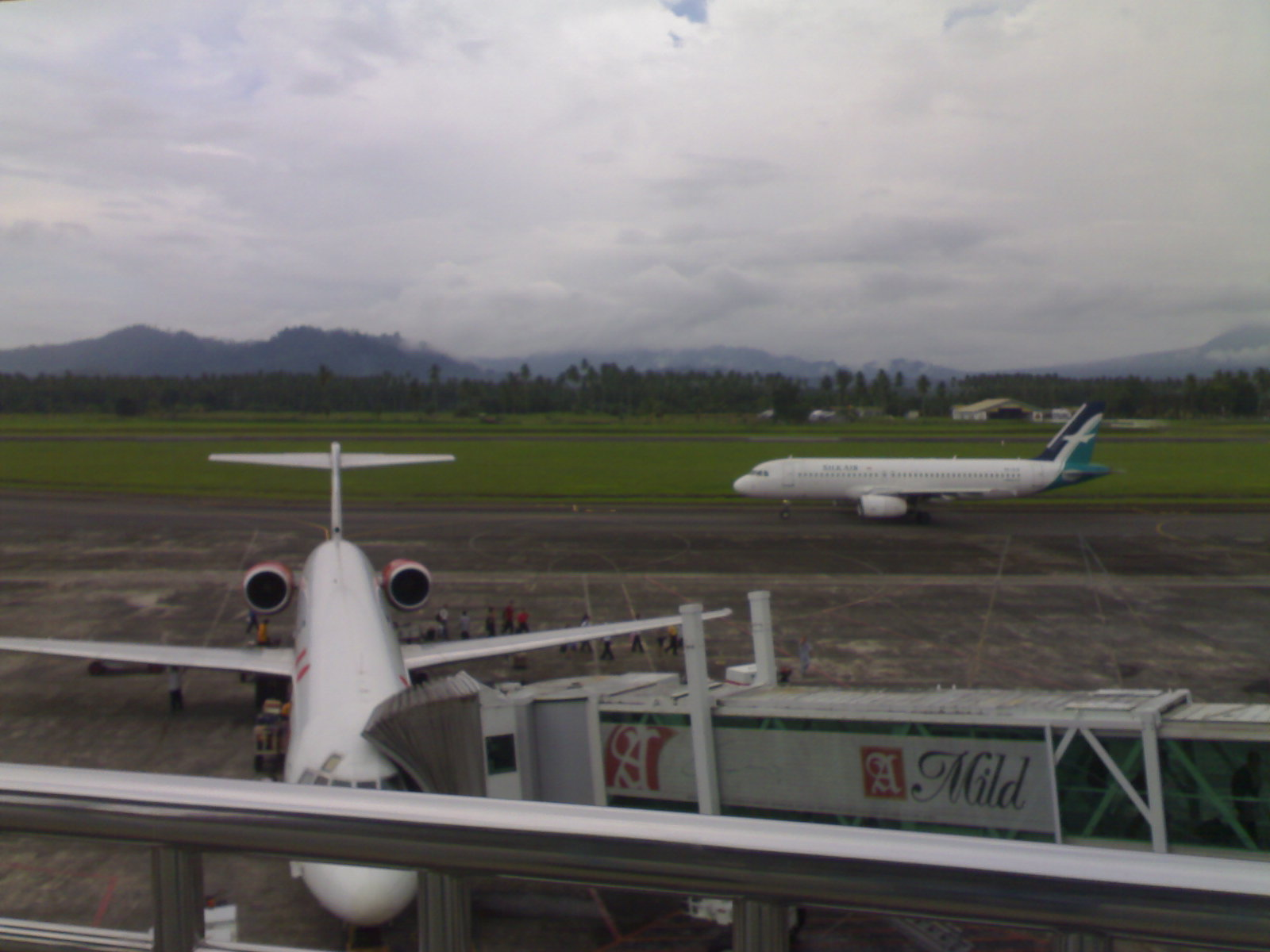
Lion Air MD-82 and SilkAir Airbus A320 at Sam Ratulangi International Airport (2006)

In 1994, Sam Ratulangi Airport was classified as a Class 1B airport, and its runway was extended to 2,650 meters (8,690 feet) in length and 45 meters (148 feet) in width. This expansion enabled the airport to accommodate larger aircraft such as the Airbus A300, Airbus A320, and the McDonnell Douglas DC-10. In the same year, SilkAir began twice weekly service to Singapore, which later increased to four times per week until the airline ceased its operations in 2021. Since May 2021, this sector has been served by Scoot.

As part of the government’s broader efforts in the 1990s to enhance regional infrastructure, Sam Ratulangi Airport came under the management of PT Angkasa Pura I (Persero), a state-owned enterprise tasked with supporting economic development and improving air transportation facilities. To meet the growing demand for air travel, a comprehensive airport development project was undertaken by the Directorate of Airport Facilities and Aviation Safety (Fasilitas Bandar Udara dan Keselamatan Penerbangan, FBUKP), with operations beginning at the end of 2000. The official transfer of operational management from the Directorate General of Civil Aviation (DGCA) to PT Angkasa Pura I (Persero) took place on 18 December 2003.

In September 2025, according to the Governor of North Sulawesi, there are plans to establish more flights connecting Manado to other international destinations such as Seoul, Hong Kong, Manila, and Taipei.

== Facilities and development ==
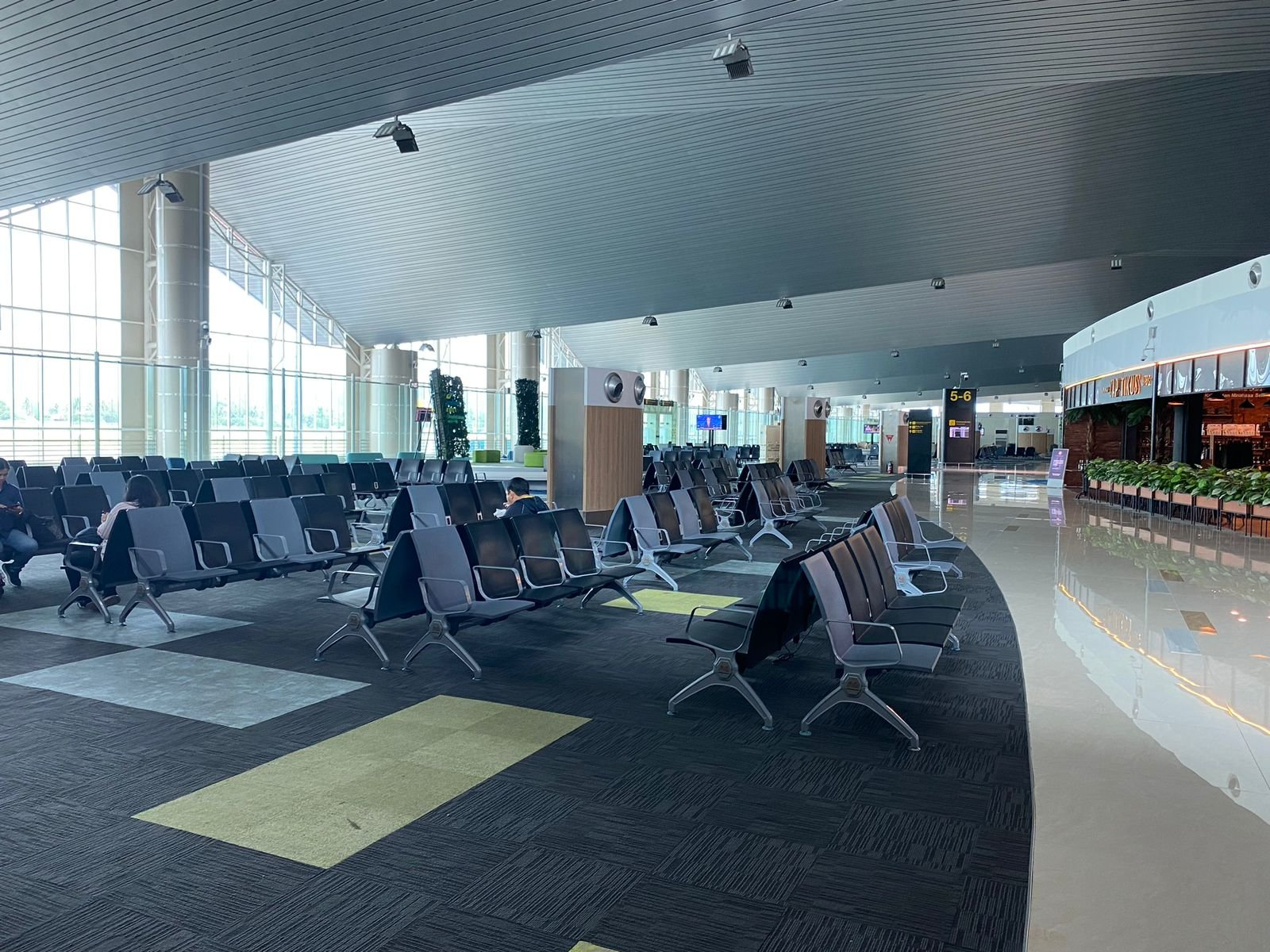
The new waiting room (completed in 2022)

Construction of a new terminal began in 1998, and the current terminal officially opened in 2001. The three-story building features 21 check-in counters, five gates, four airbridges, two baggage claim belts, and an open-air waving gallery on the upper level. The international passenger terminal, covering 4,044 square meters (43,530 square feet), has a capacity of up to 183,000 passengers annually, while the larger domestic terminal, at 14,126 square meters (152,050 square feet), can serve up to 1.3 million passengers per year. During peak hours, the terminal can accommodate up to 2,816 passengers simultaneously. The aircraft parking apron spans 54,300 square meters (584,000 square feet) and can accommodate four wide-body aircraft along with eleven medium and small-bodied aircraft.

In preparation for the World Ocean Conference and Coral Triangle Initiative Summit in May 2009, the airport underwent a minor upgrade, which included improvements to the apron, international boarding lounge, CIP (Commercially Important Person) room, and car parking area. The apron was expanded to 71,992 square meters (774,920 square feet), and the parking facility was enlarged to accommodate 500 vehicles. Additionally, the international departure and arrival lounges were expanded, including the installation of an additional aerobridge.

A major terminal expansion project was completed in 2022, increasing the terminal area from 26,000 square meters (280,000 square feet) to 56,000 square meters (600,000 square feet), raising the airport's total passenger handling capacity to 5.7 million annually.

== Airlines and destinations ==
=== Passenger ===
Eastar Jet Boeing 737-800 at Sam Ratulangi International Airport

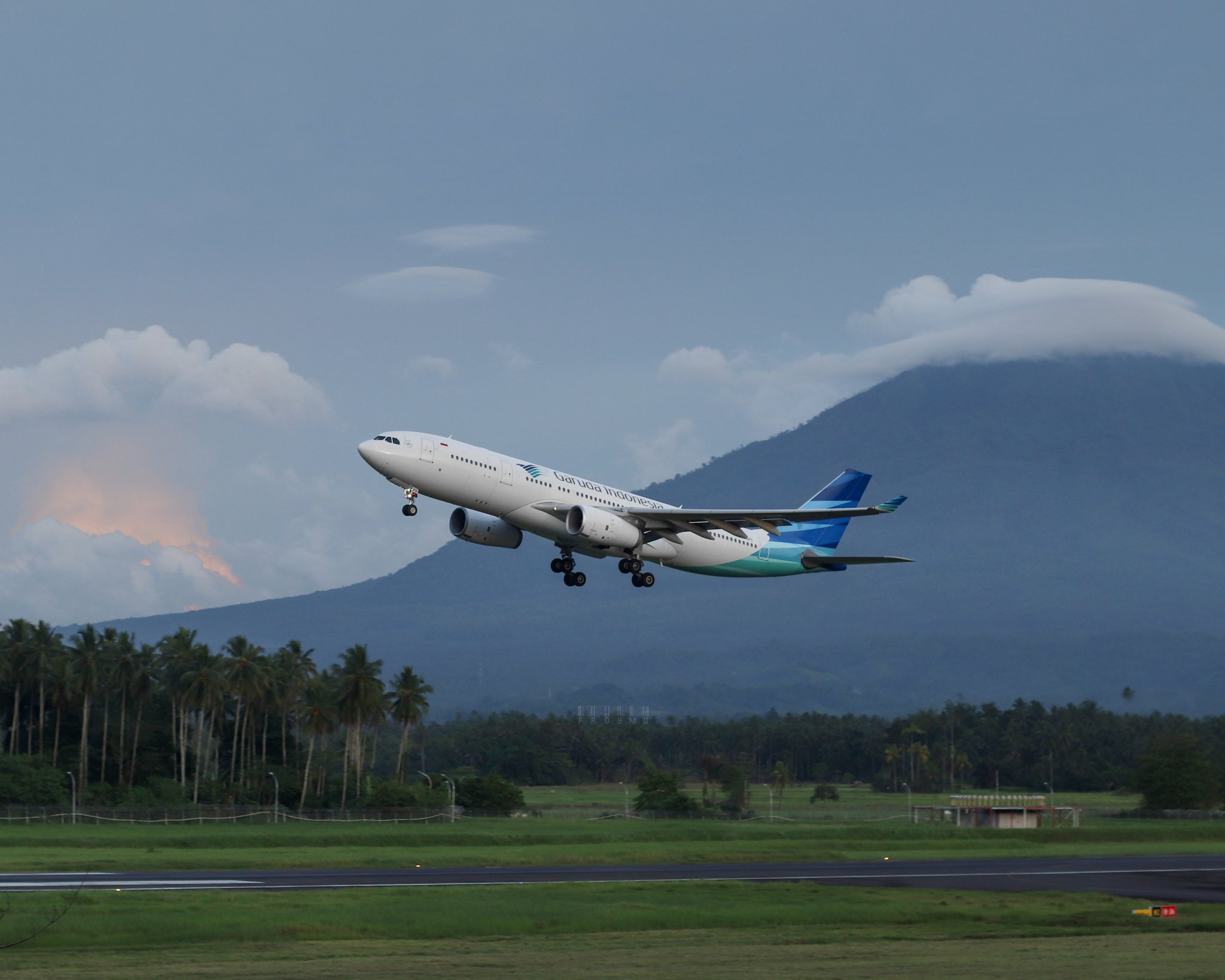
Garuda Indonesia Airbus A330-300 and Mount Klabat

Airlines	Destinations
Airfast Indonesia	Charter: Jakarta–Soekarno-Hatta, Timika
Batik Air	Jakarta–Soekarno-Hatta, Makassar; Charter: Ningbo
China Southern Airlines	Guangzhou
Citilink	Jakarta–Soekarno-Hatta
Eastar Jet	Seoul–Incheon
Garuda Indonesia	Jakarta–Soekarno-Hatta; Charter: Guangzhou
Lion Air	Denpasar, (Note: Denpasar is continuation of Makassar flight with the same flight number.) Jakarta–Soekarno-Hatta, (Note: Jakarta–Soekarno-Hatta is continuation of Makassar flight with the same flight number.) Jayapura, (Note: Jayapura is continuation of Sorong flight with the same flight number.) Makassar, Sorong, Surabaya; Charter: Fuzhou, Nanjing
Scoot	Singapore
Sriwijaya Air	Ternate
Super Air Jet	Balikpapan
Susi Air	Bolaang Mongondow, Melongguane, Siau
TransNusa	Denpasar, Guangzhou, Makassar, Sorong, Ternate; Charter: Nanjing, Shanghai–Pudong, Shenzhen, Taipei–Taoyuan
Wings Air	Ambon, (Note: Ambon is continuation of Ternate flight with the same flight number.) Gorontalo, Labuha, Luwuk, Ternate

== Traffic ==
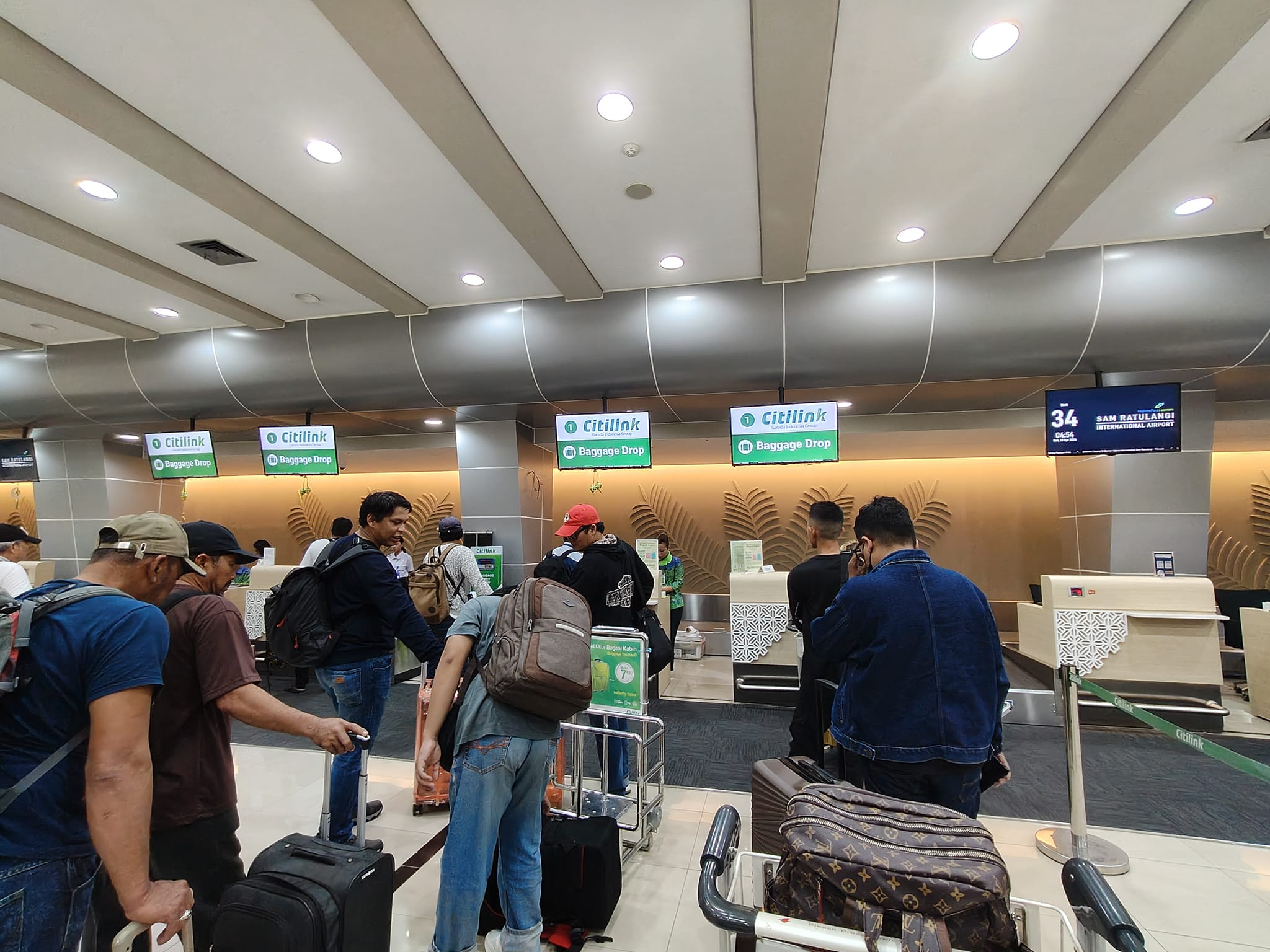
Check-in counters

Annual passenger numbers and aircraft statistics
Year	Passengers handled	Passenger % change	Cargo (tonnes)	Cargo % change	Aircraft movements	Aircraft % change
2006	1,140,334	Steady	9,014	Steady	14,381	Steady
2007	1,134,570	▼0.5	9,348	▲3.7	13,394	▼6.9
2008	1,164,346	▲2.6	9,963	▲6.6	14,496	▲8.2
2009	1,270,235	▲9.1	9,243	▼7.2	14,838	▲2.4
2010	1,665,673	▲31.1	11,520	▲24.6	16,975	▲14.4
2011	1,772,484	▲6.4	11,615	▲0.8	16,453	▼3.1
2012	2,155,375	▲21.6	11,374	▼2.1	17,620	▲7.1
2013	2,322,162	▲7.7	11,759	▲3.4	19,925	▲13.1
2014	2,016,206	▼13.2	5,469	▼53.5	20,186	▲1.3
2015	2,113,737	▲4.8	12,397	▲126.7	20,841	▲3.2
2016	2,618,105	▲23.9	12,122	▼2.2	26,364	▲26.5
2017	2,713,339	▲3.6	14,762	▲21.8	27,587	▲4.6
2018	2,747,279	▲1.3	15,259	▲3.4	26,995	▼2.1
2019	2,229,585	▼18.8	13,601	▼10.9	21,965	▼18.6
2020	937,988	▼57.9	15,251	▲12.1	12,166	▼44.6
2021	924,686	▼1.4	16,580	▲8.7	11,918	▼2.0
2022	1,277,917	▲38.2	16,087	▼3.0	13,649	▲14.5
2023	1,679,444	▲31.4	14,135	▼12.1	16,602	▲21.6
2024	1,761,765	▲4.9	16,504	▲16.8	17,260	▲4.0
^{Source: DGCA, BPS}

== Ground transportations ==
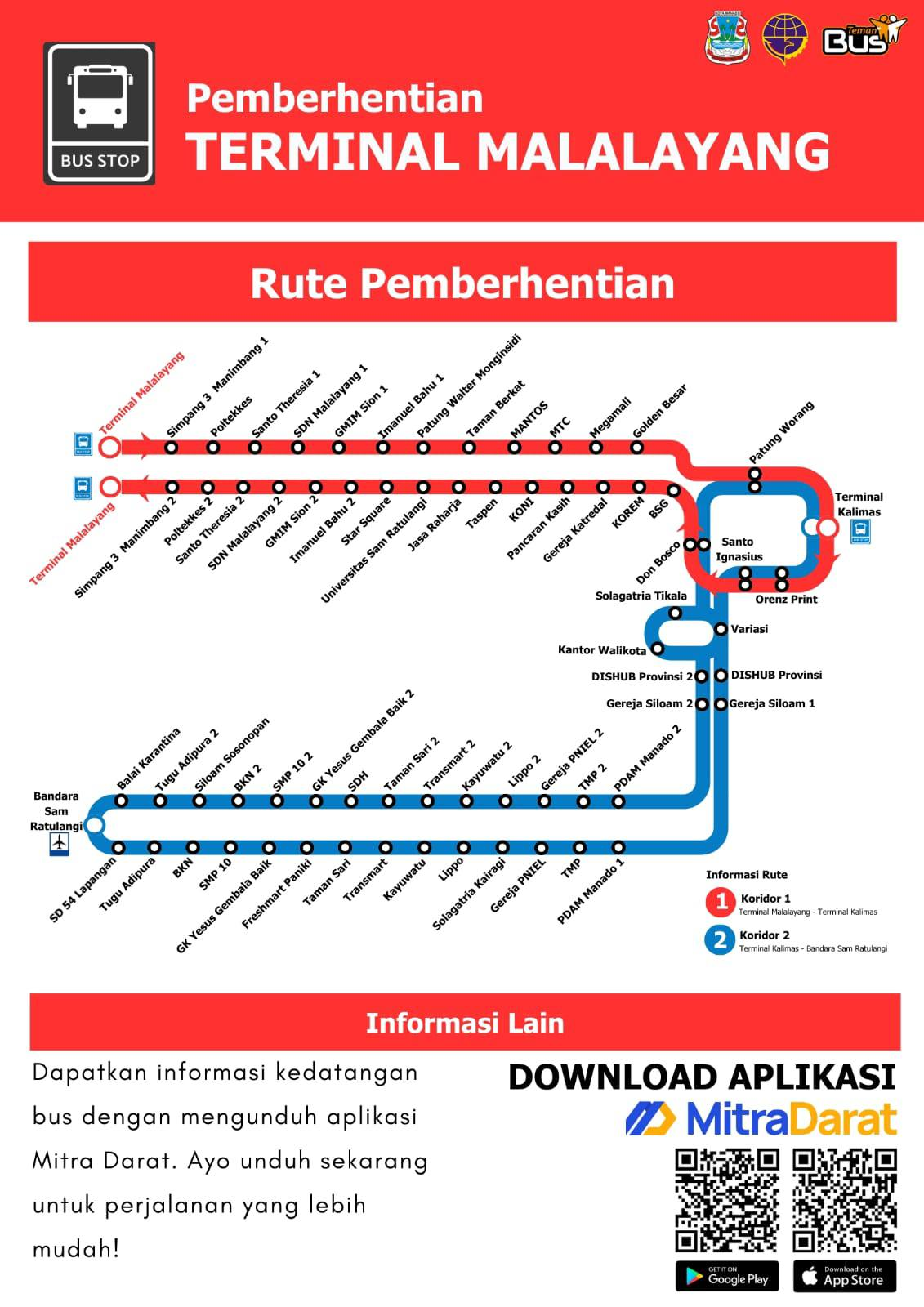
Map of Line 1 and Line 2 of Trans Manado bus system

=== Bus ===
Sam Ratulangi International Airport is served by Trans Manado bus system. The bus service charges a flat rate of Rp 4.500 per trip and the payment system utilizes electronic money card (Kartu Uang Elektronik/KUE), which can be purchased at various convenience stores (such as Alfamart and Indomaret) or on e-commerce platforms (such as Shopee and Tokopedia).

To Airport
Operator	Line	Origin	Destination	Route
Trans Manado	2	Terminal Kalimas	Bandara Internasional Sam Ratulangi	Terminal Kalimas (transit point to Line 1) → Orenz Point → St Ignatius → Variasi → Kantor Walikota → Solagratia Tikala → Dishub Provinsi → Gereja Siloam 1 → PDAM Manado 1 → TMP → Gereja PNIEL → Solagratia Kairagi → Lippo → Kayuwatu → Transmart → Tamansari → Freshmart Paniki → GK Yesus Gembala Baik → SMP 10 → BKN → Tugu Adipura → SD 54 Lapangan → Bandara Internasional Sam Ratulangi

From Airport
Operator	Line	Origin	Destination	Route
Trans Manado	2	Bandara Internasional Sam Ratulangi	Terminal Kalimas	Bandara Internasional Sam Ratulangi → Balai Karantina → Tugu Adipura 2 → Siloam Sosonopan → BKN 2 → SMP 10 2 → GK Yesus Gembala Baik 2 → SDH → Tamansari 2 → Transmart 2 → Kayuwatu 2 → Lippo 2 → Gereja Pniel 2 → TMP 2 → PDAM Manado 2 → Gereja Siloam 2 → Dishub Provinsi 2 → Kantor Walikota → Solagratia Tikala → Don Bosco (transit point to Line 1) → Patung Worang → Terminal Kalimas (transit point to Line 1)

In addition to Trans Manado bus system, Perum DAMRI operates buses from the airport to various tourist attractions like Lake Linow and Paal Beach.

=== Taxi ===
Metered-taxis such as Bluebird available at the airport until the last flight of the day arrives.

== Accidents and incidents ==
- 16 February 1967 – Garuda Indonesian Airways Flight 708, UPG-MDC, Lockheed L-188C Electra (PK-GLB), 22 of 84 passengers were killed (no fatalities among the eight crew members). Flight 708 departed Jakarta at 7:30 WIB(GMT+7/UTC+7) on 15 February for a flight to Manado via Surabaya and Makassar. On the second leg of the flight, bad weather in Makassar forced the crew to return to Surabaya. The flight continued the next day to Makassar and on to Manado. The cloud base in Manado was 900 feet (270 metres) with 2 kilometres (1.2 miles) visibility. An approach to runway 18 was made, but after passing a hill 200 feet (61 metres) above runway elevation and 2,720 feet (830 metres) short of the threshold, the pilot realised he was too high and left of the centreline. The nose was lowered and the aircraft banked right to intercept the glide path. The speed decreased below the 125 knots (232 kilometres per hour; 144 miles per hour) target threshold speed and the aircraft, still banked to the right, landed heavily 156 feet (48 metres) short of the runway threshold. The undercarriage collapsed and the aircraft skidded and caught fire.
- 26 May 1974 – Grumman HU-16 Albatross operated by Indonesian Air Force hit a mountain in bad weather and crashed into dense jungle while on a mission to supply fuel to Manado.
- 7 January 1976 – Mandala Airlines, Vickers 806 Viscount (PK-RVK), no fatalities. Landing in slight intermittent rain, the aircraft touched down 520 metres (1,710 feet) down the runway. The aircraft overran the runway, crossed a ditch and three drains before coming to rest 180 metres (590 feet) past the end of the runway.
- 10 December 1982 – Bouraq Indonesia Airlines, Hawker Siddeley HS-748 (PK-IHI), no fatalities. The nose landing gear collapsed on landing, causing the aircraft to veer off the runway.
- 3 October 1986 – East Indonesia Air Taxi, MAL-MDC, Shorts SC.7 Skyvan (PK-ESC), all 10 passengers and 3 crew members were killed. Struck a mountain.
- 9 May 1991 – Merpati Nusantara Airlines 7533, TTE-MDC, Fokker F-27 Friendship (PK-MFD), all eight passengers and five crew members were killed when the aircraft crashed into a mountain.
- 1 January 2007 – Adam Air Flight 574 was nearing Sulawesi, coming to Manado Airport from Juanda International Airport. The pilots of the Boeing 737-400 flew off course when their navigation system failed, eventually entering a storm near the island where they became spatially disoriented. The flight spiraled downwards rapidly and broke up, leading to the death of all 102 people on board.

== Gallery ==
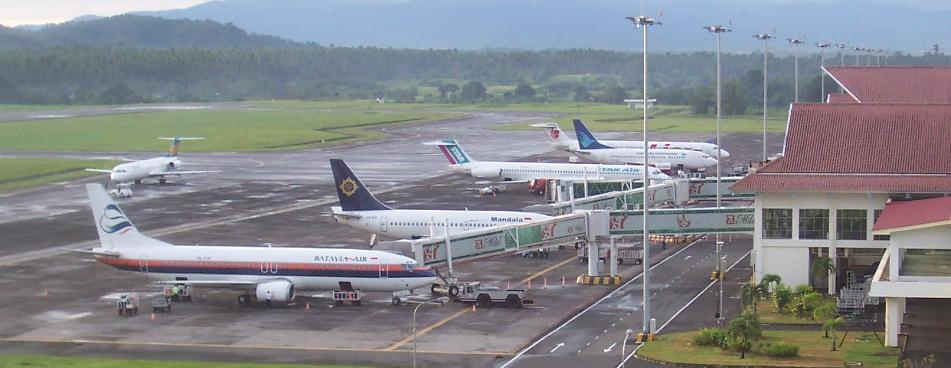
Sam Ratulangi Airport (2004)
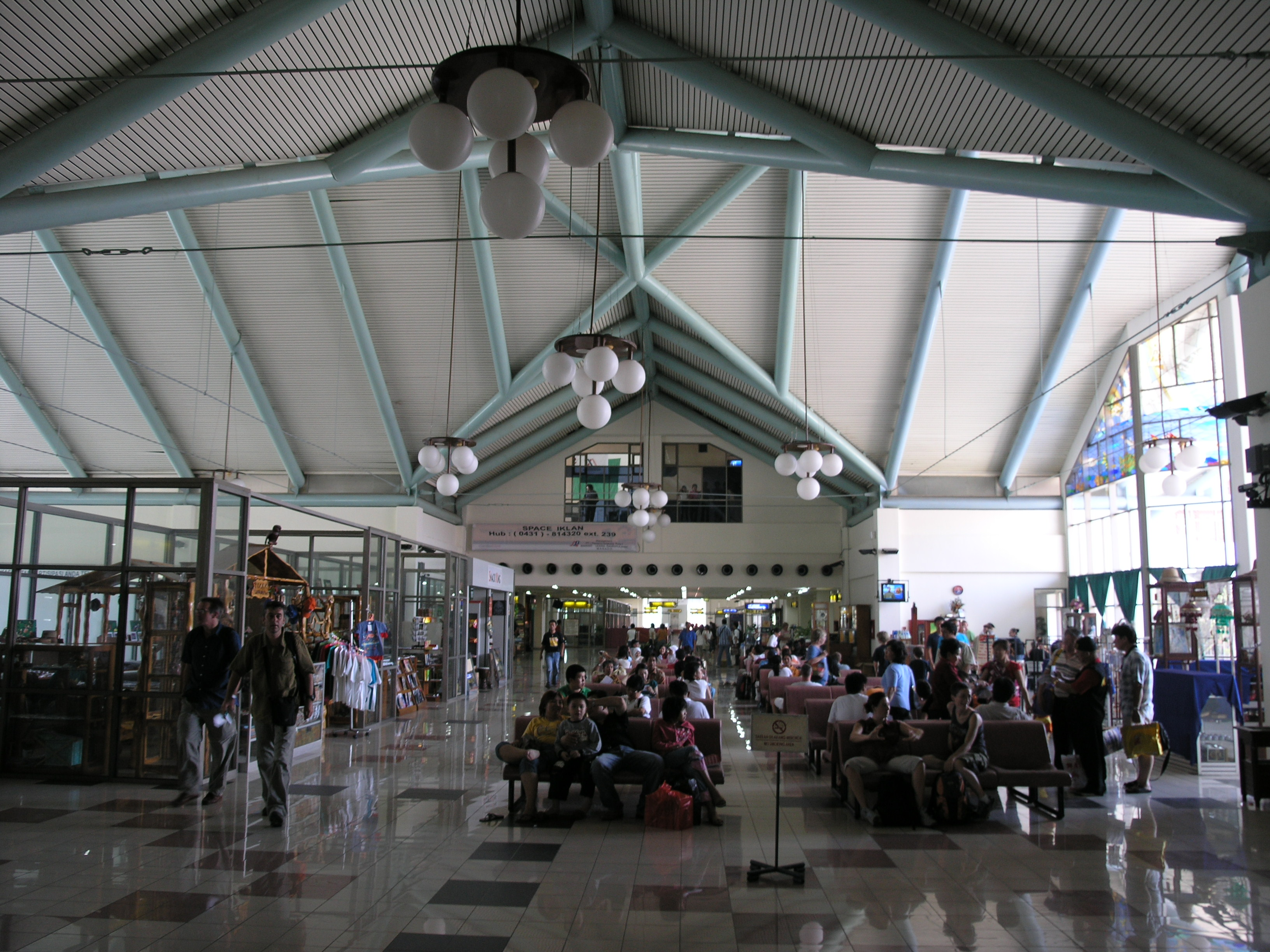
The waiting room prior to renovation (2006)

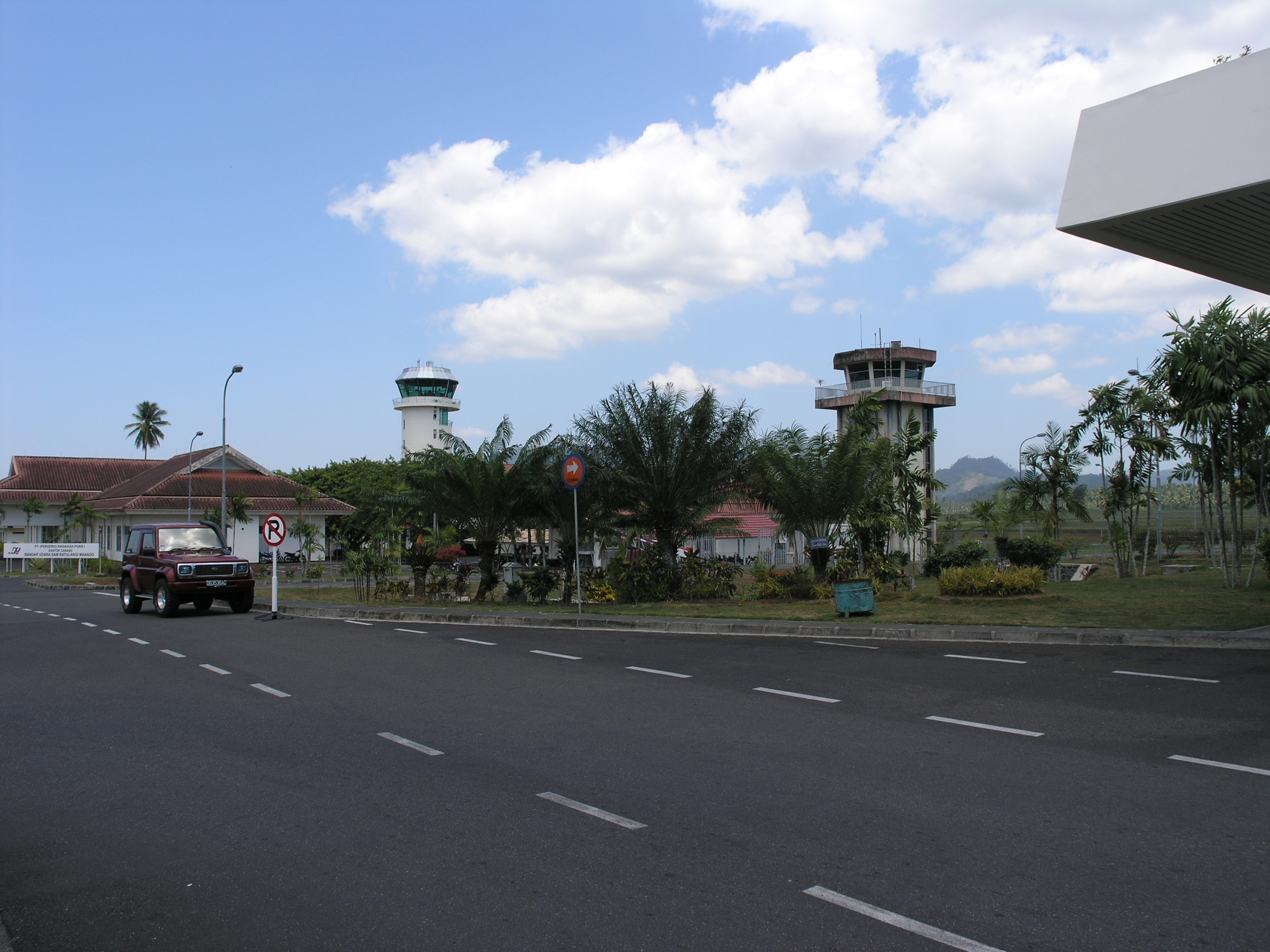
Current and old ATC towers

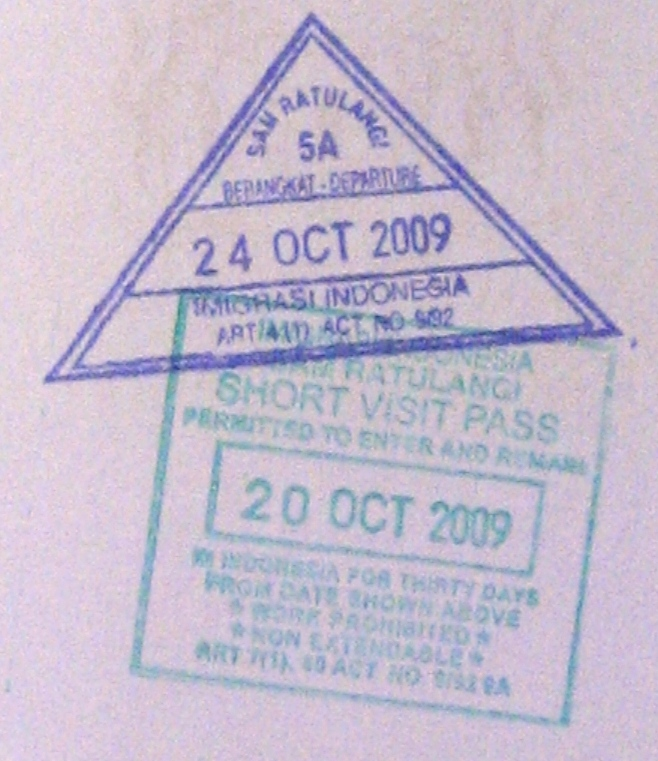
Passport entry (green) and exit stamps from the airport
