= 2000 Royal Nepal Airlines DHC-6 crash =

Commercial aviation incident

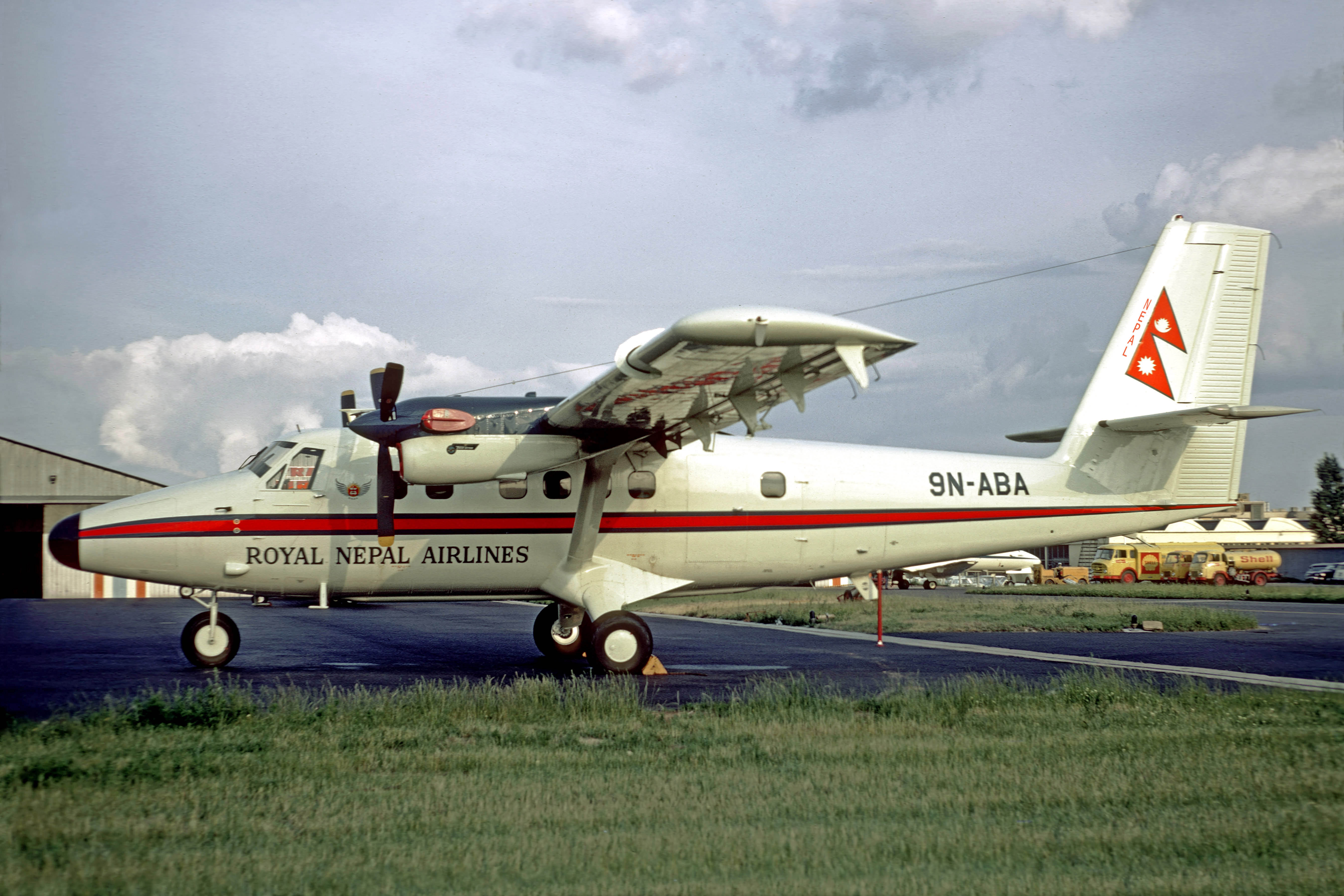
- A Royal Nepal Airlines de Havilland Canada DHC-6 Twin Otter, similar to the aircraft involved in the accident

Accident
- Date: 27 July 2000
- Summary: Controlled flight into terrain due to pilot error
- Site: Jogbuda, Dadeldhura District, Nepal; 29°02′24″N 80°42′0″E

Aircraft
- Aircraft type: de Havilland Canada DHC-6 Twin Otter
- Operator: Royal Nepal Airlines
- Registration: 9N-ABP
- Flight origin: Bajhang Airport, Jayaprithvi, Bajhang, Nepal
- Destination: Dhangadhi Airport, Dhangadhi, Nepal
- Occupants: 25
- Passengers: 22
- Crew: 3
- Fatalities: 25
- Survivors: 0

On 27 July 2000, a de Havilland Canada DHC-6 Twin Otter operated by Royal Nepal Airlines crashed in Nepal en route from Bajhang Airport to Dhangadhi Airport on a domestic passenger flight. The wreckage of the aircraft, registration 9N-ABP, was found in Jogbuda, Dadeldhura District. All 22 passengers and the three crew aboard were killed in the crash. An investigation into the crash was launched by Nepalese authorities after the accident site was located.

== Aircraft ==
The aircraft involved in the crash was a de Havilland Canada DHC-6 Twin Otter operated by Royal Nepal Airlines. Its maiden flight was in 1979 with Royal Nepal Airlines, which bought the aircraft from manufacturer de Havilland Canada. The crash was the eighth accident of this aircraft operated type in service with Royal Nepal Airlines and the twelfth accident involving this type of aircraft in the aviation history of Nepal.

== Crew and passengers ==
All occupants on board died in the crash; occupants included the three crew members and 22 passengers, of which three were small children. All occupants were Nepalis.

== Accident ==
The flight was a scheduled 30 minutes domestic flight from Bajhang Airport, where it left at 10:11 Nepal Standard Time for Dhangadhi Airport in Far-Western Nepal. The last radio contact was made at 10:31, just two minutes before the aircraft was expected to land in Dhangadhi. After a helicopter was deployed to the crash site, it was found that the aircraft had collided with trees and crashed on the 1,310 meter (4300 foot) high Jarayakhali Hill of the Sivalik Hills in Jogbuda, Dadeldhura District, where it caught fire.

== See also ==
- List of airplane accidents in Nepal
