= Dewal (disambiguation) =

Dewal is a union council in Punjab, Pakistan.

Dewal may also refer to

- Biron Dewal, a village in India
- Ketakeshwar Dewal, a holy site in Assam, India
- Dewal Dibyapur, a village in Nepal
- Dewal Manal, a union council in Khyber-Pakhtunkhwa, Pakistan
- Narayan Singh Dewal (born 1964), an Indian politician

== See also ==
- Deval (disambiguation)
