= Pasela =

Pasela पसेला is the small village in the Dadeldhura district of Nepal.

== Location ==
It is located 200 kilometers from Dadeldhura Market, and is surrounded by the Himalayas. Its neighboring villages are Choudi to the east, Dugari to the west, Chipur to the north, and Bagarkot to the south.

Pasela is also the home town of the Pandeya, Bisht, Sharki, and Lohaar Cast peoples.

== Climate ==
Pasela has a sub-tropical climate with cool winters, warm and crisp springs, hot summers and a strong monsoon. The mountains around Pasela never receive sustained snowfall in winter.

== Transport ==
Most people in the village travel by foot only, although some have begun to use vehicles.
