= Parshuram, Dadeldhura =

Parshuram परशुराम
- Municipality
- Location within Sudurpashchim Province Location within Nepal
- Country: Nepal
- Province: Sudurpashchim
- District: Dadeldhura
- No. of wards: 12
- Established: 2014
- Incorporated (VDC): Jogbuda and Sirsha
- Incorporated (date): 2014

Government
  - Type: Mayor–council
  - Body: Parshuram Municipality

Area
  - Total: 159.87 km^{2} (61.73 sq mi)

Population (2011)
  - Total: 34,983
- Time zone: UTC+05:45 (NPT)
- Website: parshurammun.gov.np/en

Parshuram Municipality is a municipality of Nepal located in Dadeldhura District of Sudurpashchim Province of Nepal. The municipality was established on 3 December 2014 together with the other 60 new municipalities.

Jogbuda and Shirsha villages were merged to form this new municipality.

Total population of the municipality (2011 Nepal census) is 34983 individuals and the total area of the municipality is 414.07 square kilometres (159.87 sq mi), the municipality is divided into 12 wards. The headquarter of the municipality is situated at Jogbuda town.
