= De Havilland Canada DHC-6 Twin Otter =

Utility transport aircraft family by de Havilland Canada

DHC-6 Twin Otter
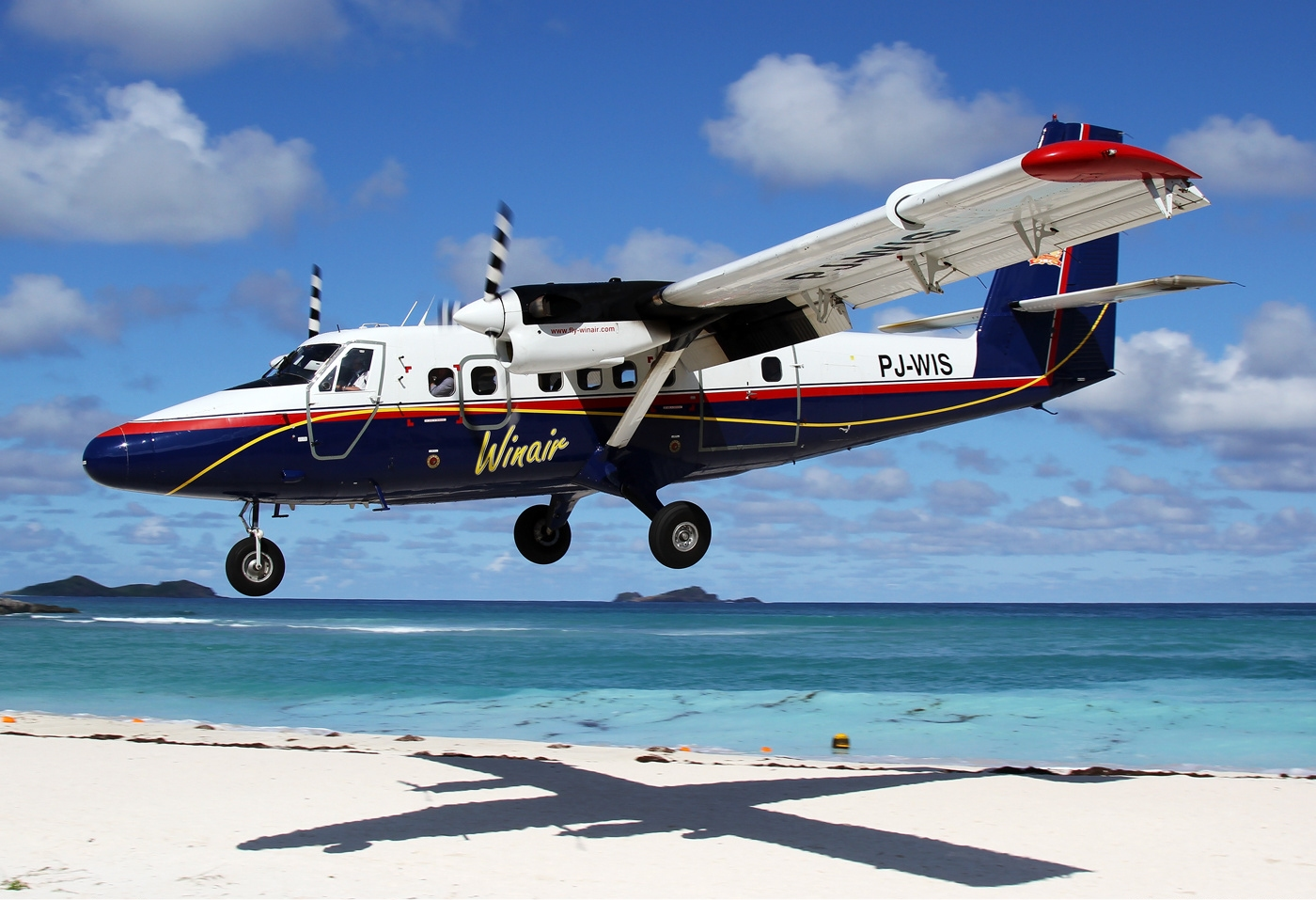
- Winair DHC-6 Twin Otter landing at Gustaf III Airport

General information
- Type: Utility aircraft
- Manufacturer: de Havilland Canada; Viking Air; De Havilland Canada
- Status: In production
- Number built: March 2026: 1000; (844 DHC, 156 Viking)

History
- Manufactured: 1965–1988 (Series 100–300); 2008–present (Series 400); 2023–present (Series 300-G)
- Introduction date: 1966
- First flight: 20 May 1965
- Developed from: de Havilland Canada DHC-3 Otter

The de Havilland Canada DHC-6 Twin Otter is a Canadian STOL (short takeoff and landing) utility aircraft developed by de Havilland Canada in the mid-1960s and still in production. It was built by De Havilland Canada from 1965 to 1988. In 2006, Viking Air purchased the type certificate and restarted production in 2008, before re-adopting the name De Havilland Canada. In 2023, DHC started production of the 300-G, an upgraded version of the Series 400 with Garmin avionics.

The aircraft's fixed tricycle undercarriage, STOL capabilities, twin turboprop engines and high rate of climb have made it a successful commuter airliner, typically seating 18–20 passengers, as well as a cargo and medical evacuation aircraft. The Twin Otter has also been popular with commercial skydiving operations and is used by the United States Army Parachute Team and the 98th Flying Training Squadron of the United States Air Force.

== Design and development ==
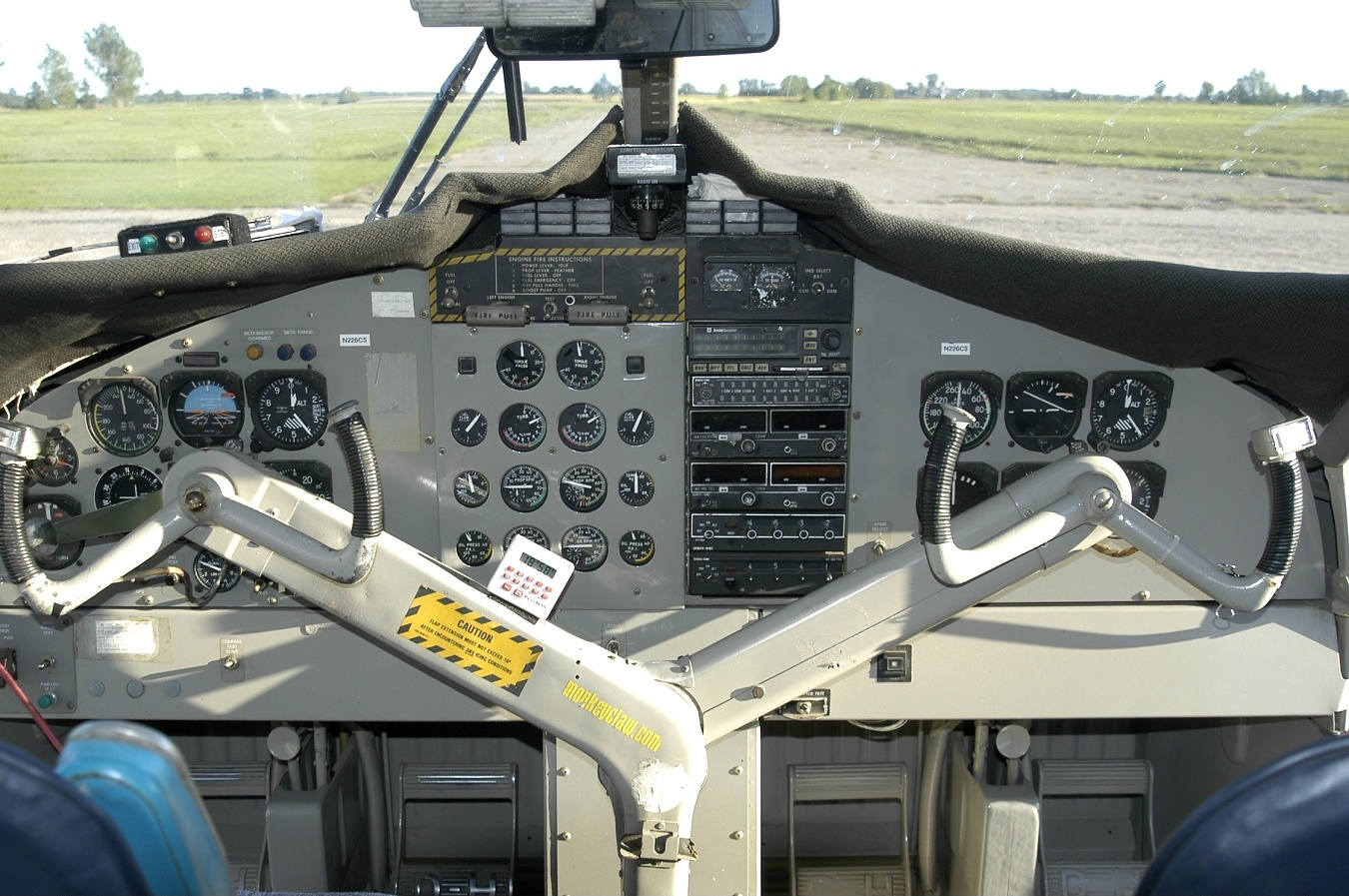
DHC-6-200 cockpit

Development of the aircraft began in 1964, with the first flight on 20 May 1965. A twin-engine replacement for the single-engine DHC-3 Otter retaining the DHC-3's STOL qualities, its design features included double-slotted trailing-edge flaps and ailerons that work in unison with the flaps to boost STOL performance. The availability of the 550 shaft horsepower (410 kW) Pratt & Whitney Canada PT6A-20 turboprop in the early 1960s made the concept of a twin feasible. A DHC-3 Otter with its piston engine replaced with two PT6A-4 engines had already flown in 1963. It had been extensively modified for STOL research. To bush plane operators, the improved reliability of turboprop power and the improved performance of a twin-engine configuration made it an immediately popular alternative to the piston-powered Otter which had been flying since 1951.

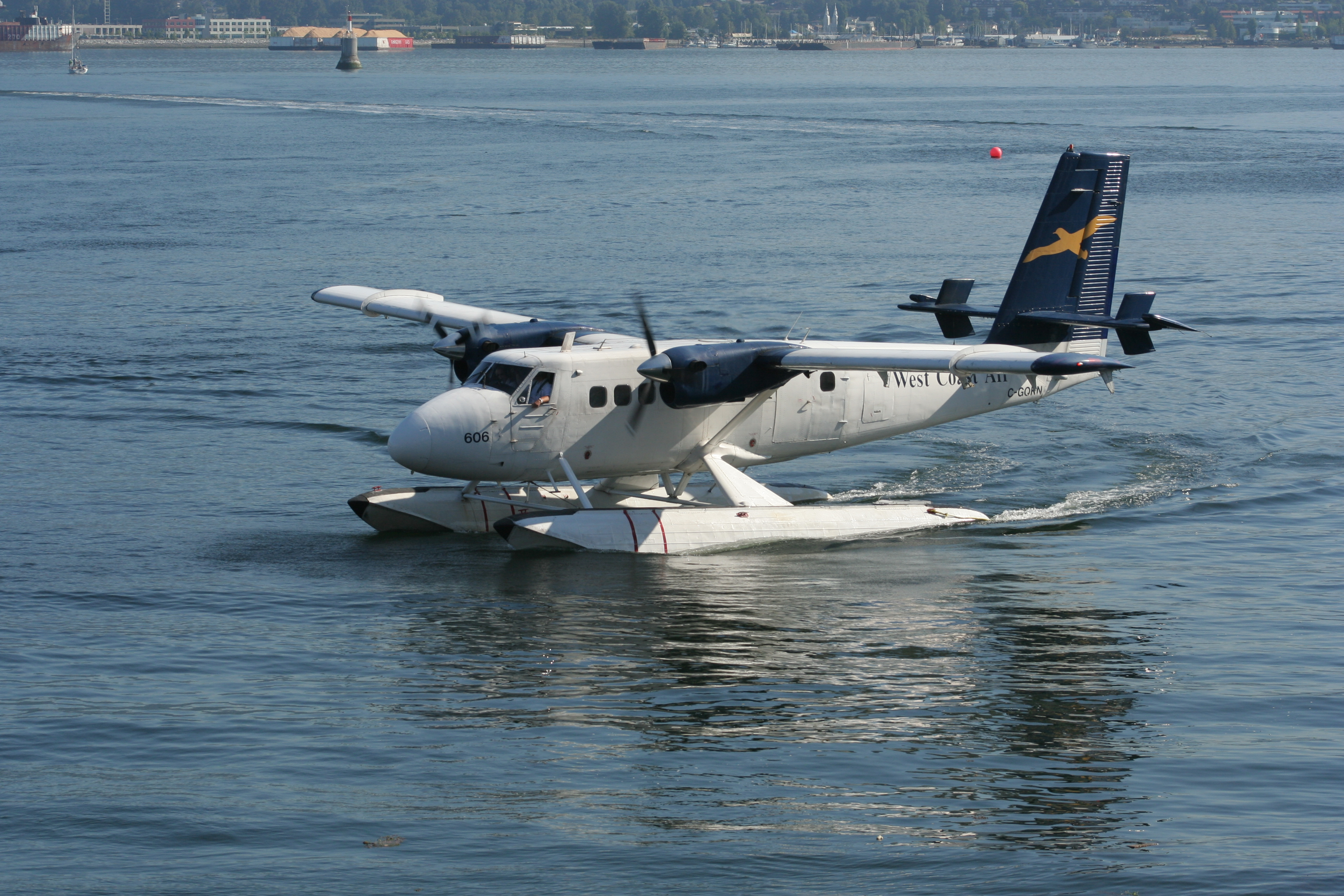
The floatplane version of the DHC-6 enables water landings.

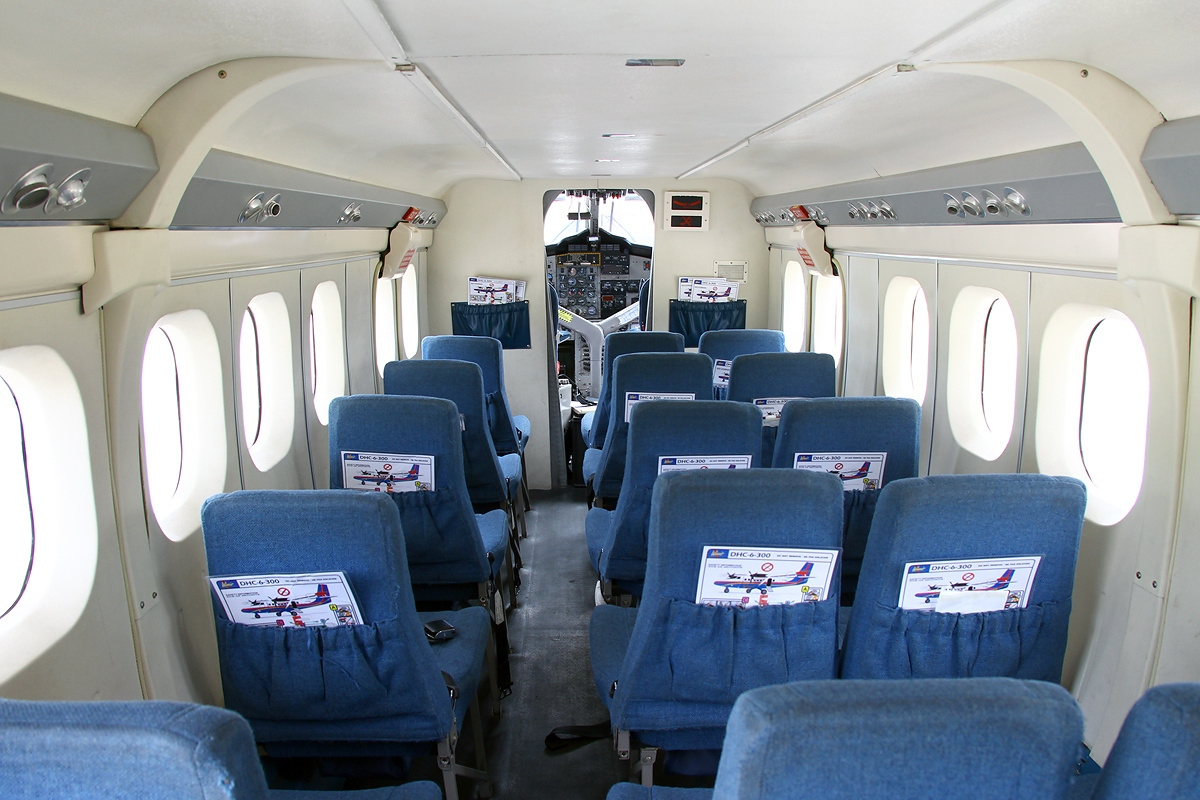
DHC-6-300 passenger cabin

The first six aircraft produced were designated Series 1, indicating that they were prototype aircraft. The initial production run consisted of Series 100 aircraft, serial numbers seven to 115 inclusive. In 1968, Series 200 production began with serial number 116. Changes made at the beginning of Series 200 production included improving the STOL performance, adding a longer nose that was equipped with a larger baggage compartment (except for aircraft fitted with floats), and fitting a larger door to the rear baggage compartment. All Series 1, 100, and 200 aircraft and their variants (110, 210) were fitted with the 550 shp (410 kW) PT6A-20 engines.

In 1969, the Series 300 was introduced, beginning with serial number 231. Both aircraft performance and payload were improved by fitting more powerful PT6A-27 engines. This was a 680 hp (510 kW) engine that was flat rated to 620 hp (460 kW) for use in the Series 300 Twin Otter. The Series 300 proved to be the most successful variant by far, with 614 Series 300 aircraft and their subvariants (Series 310 for United Kingdom operators, Series 320 for Australian operators, etc.) sold before production in Toronto by de Havilland Canada ended in 1988.

In 1972, its unit cost was US$680,000, In 1976, a new -300 would have cost $700,000 ($3 million 31 years later) and is still worth more than $2.5 million in 2018 despite the -400 introduction, many years after the -300 production ceased. 844 had been produced by the time the first production end run ended in 1988.

=== New production ===
After Series 300 production ended, the remaining tooling was purchased by Viking Air of Victoria, British Columbia, which manufactures replacement parts for out-of-production de Havilland Canada aircraft. On 24 February 2006, Viking purchased the type certificates from Bombardier Aviation for all out-of-production de Havilland Canada aircraft (DHC-1 through DHC-7). The ownership of the certificates gives Viking the exclusive right to manufacture new aircraft.

On 17 July 2006, at the Farnborough Airshow, Viking Air announced its intention to offer a Series 400 Twin Otter. On 2 April 2007, Viking announced that with 27 orders and options in hand, it was restarting production of the Twin Otter, equipped with more powerful Pratt & Whitney Canada PT6A-34 engines. As of November 2007, 40 firm orders and 10 options had been taken and a new final assembly plant was established in Calgary, Alberta. Zimex Aviation of Switzerland received the first new production aircraft, serial number 845, in July 2010. By mid-2014, Viking had built 55 new aircraft at its Calgary facility. The production rate as of summer 2014 was about 24 aircraft per year. In April 2015, Viking announced a reduction of the production rate to 18 aircraft per year. On 17 June 2015, Viking announced a partnership with a Chinese firm, Reignwood Aviation Group; the group would purchase 50 aircraft and become the exclusive supplier of new Series 400 Twin Otters in China.

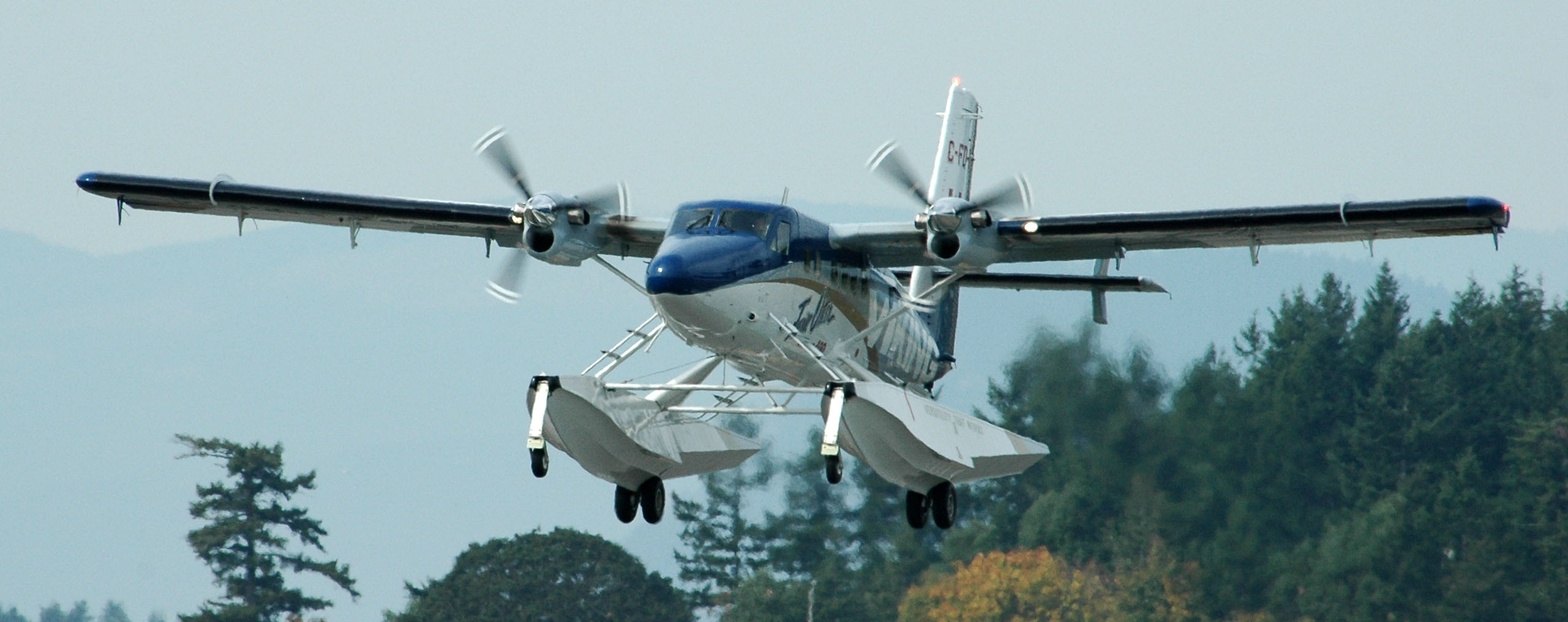
First flight of the Series 400 technical demonstrator by Viking Air at Victoria Airport, 1 October 2008

Major changes introduced with the Series 400 include Honeywell Primus Apex fully integrated avionics, deletion of the AC electrical system, modernization of the electrical and lighting systems, and use of composites for non load-bearing structures such as doors.

The 100th Series 400 Twin Otter (MSN 944) was displayed at the July 2017 EAA AirVenture Oshkosh. At the time 38% were operated as regional airliners, 31% were in military aviation use, 26% in industrial support and 5% were in private air charter. Seventy were on regular landing gear wheels, 18 were configured as straight or amphibious floatplanes, 10 had tundra tires and two had wheel skis.

In 2019, Viking started making plastic components for the Twin Otter by 3D printer to help reduce cost. Twin Otter production was suspended in 2019 during the COVID-19 pandemic. In July 2022, DHC announced that it was reviewing the program and supply chain, with a decision on when to resume production expected "in the near future". In 2023, its equipped price was $7.25M.

In June 2023, Viking, now operating as De Havilland Canada, started production of the new DHC-6 Classic 300-G.

On 20 March 2026, De Havilland Canada delivered its 1000th DHC-6 Twin Otter produced and delivered aircraft to SATENA, a regional government-owned airline of Colombia.

== Operational history ==
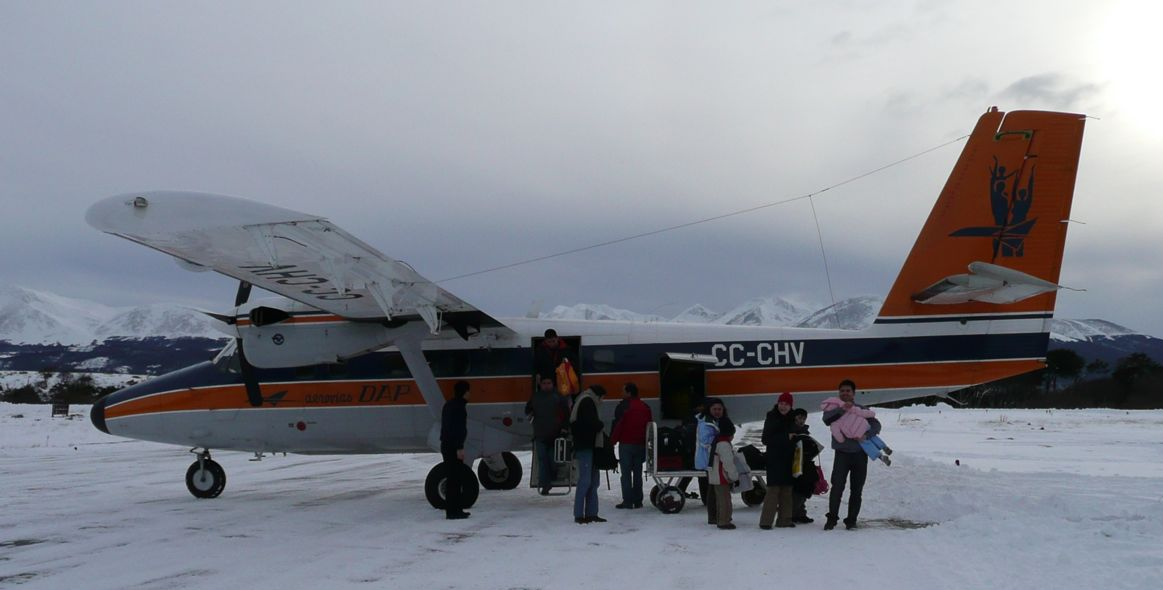
Aerovías DAP DHC-6 Series 300 at Puerto Williams, Chile

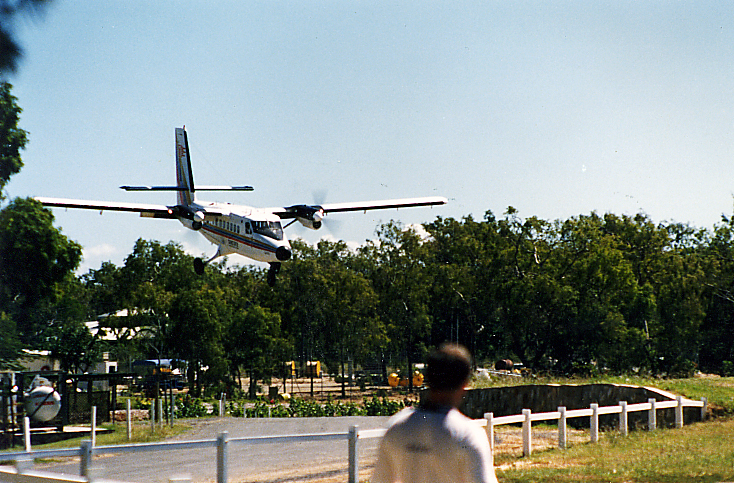
A Twin Otter making a normal landing approach in Queensland, Australia

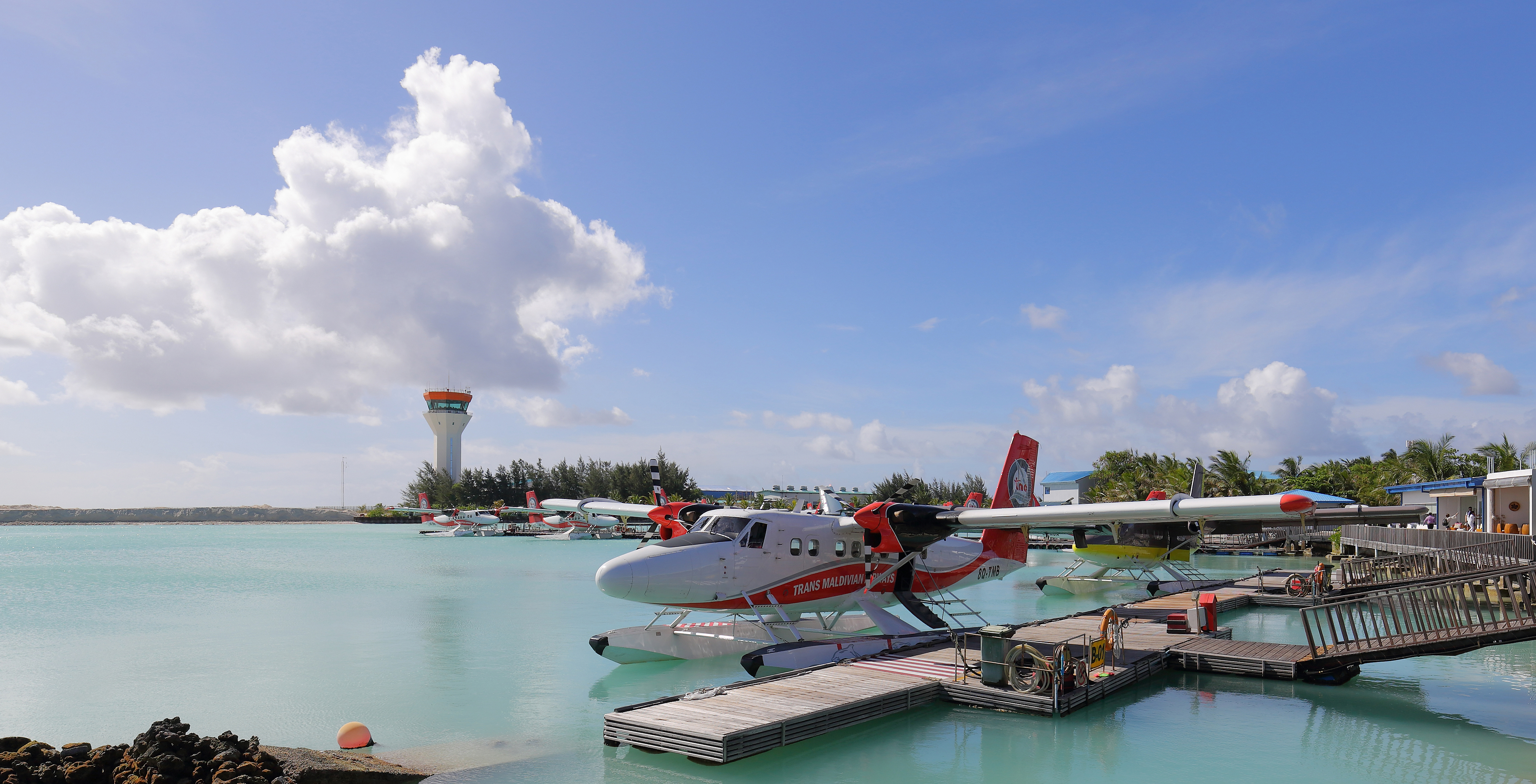
A Trans Maldivian Airways Twin Otter at Velana International Airport, Maldives

Maldivian DHC-6 Twin Otter water landing

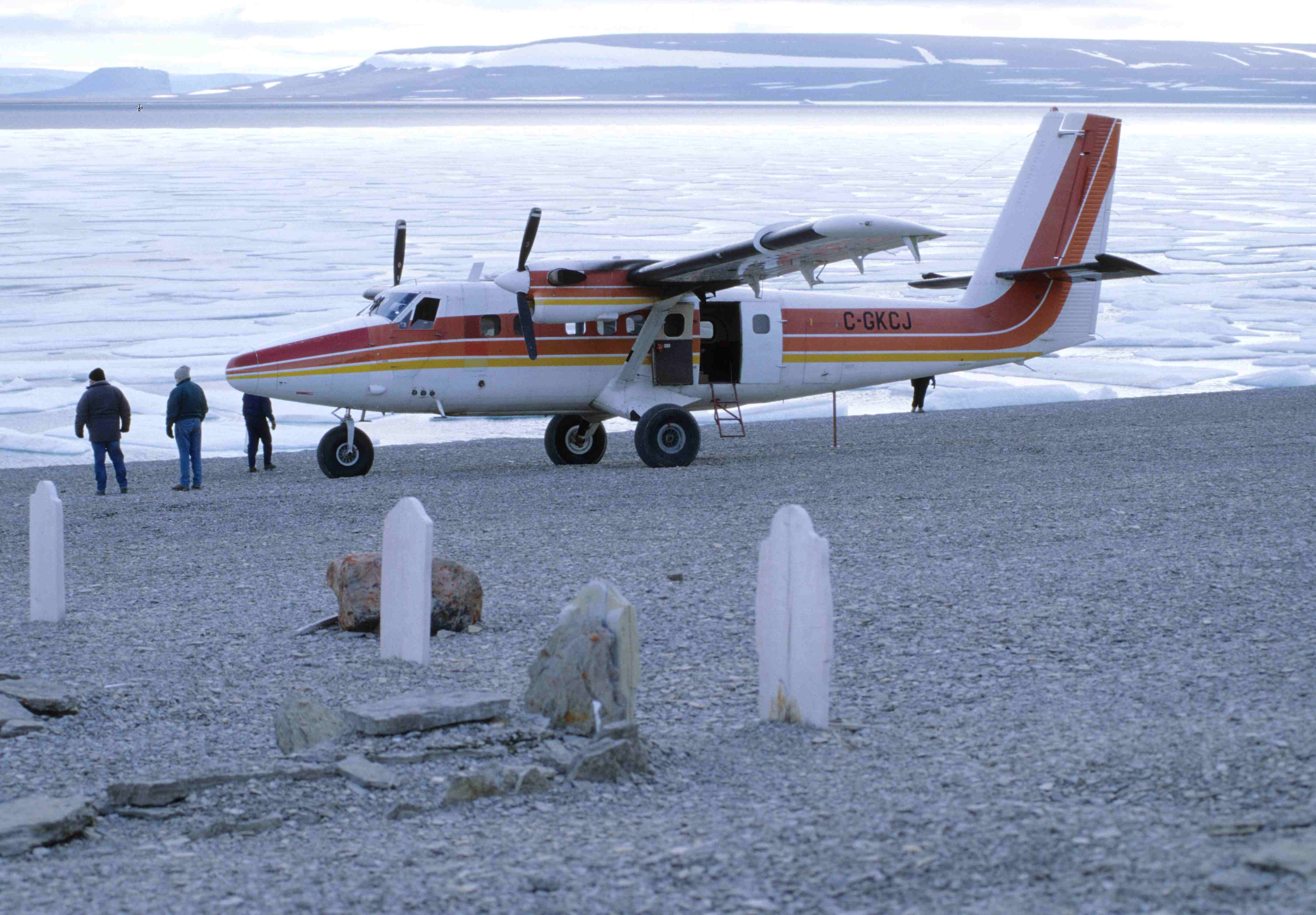
De Havilland Canada DHC-6 Twin Otter on Beechey Island at the graves of seamen who were part of Franklin's lost expedition (Nunavut, Canada) circa 1997. Note the tundra tires.

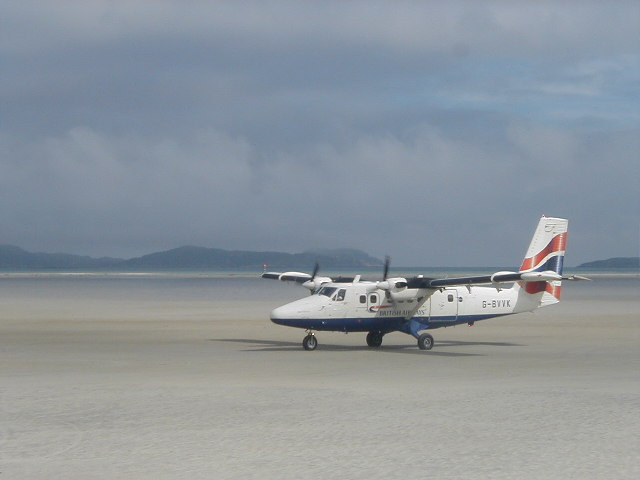
Twin Otter daily scheduled service between Glasgow (Scotland) and Barra Airport's sandy beach runway

Twin Otters could be delivered directly from the factory with floats, skis, or tricycle landing gear fittings, making them adaptable bush planes for remote and northern areas. Areas including Canada and the United States, (specifically Alaska) had much of the demand. Many Twin Otters still serve in the Arctic and subarctic, but they can also be found in Africa, Australia, Asia, Antarctica, and other regions where bush planes are the optimum means of travel. Their versatility and manoeuvrability have made them popular in areas with difficult flying environments such as Papua New Guinea. In Norway, the Twin Otter paved the way for the network of short-field airports, connecting rural areas with larger towns. The Twin Otter showed outstanding reliability, and remained in service until 2000 on certain routes. Widerøe of Norway was, at one time, the world's largest operator of Twin Otters. During one period of its tenure in Norway, the Twin Otter fleet achieved over 96,000 cycles (take-off, flight, and landing) per year.

A number of commuter airlines in the United States got their start by operating Twin Otters in scheduled passenger operations. Houston Metro Airlines (which later changed its name to Metro Airlines) constructed their own STOLport airstrip with a passenger terminal and maintenance hangar in Clear Lake City, Texas, near the Johnson Space Center. The Clear Lake City STOLport was specifically designed for Twin Otter operations. According to the February 1976 edition of the Official Airline Guide, Houston Metro operated 22 round-trip flights every weekday at this time between Clear Lake City (CLC) and Houston Intercontinental Airport, now George Bush Intercontinental Airport, in a scheduled passenger airline shuttle operation. Houston Metro had agreements in place for connecting passenger feed services with Continental Airlines and Eastern Air Lines at Houston Intercontinental, with this major airport having a dedicated STOL landing area at the time specifically for Twin Otter flight operations. The Clear Lake City STOLport is no longer in existence.

The Walt Disney World resort in Florida was also served with scheduled airline flights operated with Twin Otter aircraft. The Walt Disney World Airport, also known as the Lake Buena Vista STOLport, was a private airfield constructed by The Walt Disney Company with Twin Otter operations in mind. In the early 1970s, Shawnee Airlines operated scheduled Twin Otter flights between the Disney resort and nearby Orlando Jetport, now Orlando International Airport, as well as to Tampa International Airport. This service by Shawnee Airlines is mentioned in the "Air Commuter Section" of the 6 September 1972 Eastern Air Lines system timetable as a connecting service to and from Eastern flights. This STOL airfield is no longer in use.

Another commuter airline in the United States, Rocky Mountain Airways, operated Twin Otters from the Lake County Airport in Leadville, Colorado. At an elevation of 9,927 ft (3,026 m) above mean sea level, this airport is the highest airfield in the United States ever to have received scheduled passenger airline service, thus demonstrating the wide-ranging flight capabilities of the Twin Otter. Rocky Mountain Airways went on to become the worldwide launch customer for the larger, four-engine de Havilland Canada Dash 7 STOL turboprop, but continued to operate the Twin Otter, as well.

Larger scheduled passenger airlines based in the United States, Canada, Mexico, the Caribbean and Australia, particularly jetliner operators, also flew Twin Otters, with the aircraft providing connecting feeder service for these airlines. Jet aircraft operators which also flew the Twin Otter included Aeronaves de Mexico, Air BC, Alaska Airlines, ALM Antillean Airlines, Ansett Airlines, Cayman Airways, Frontier Airlines, LIAT, Norcanair, Nordair, Ozark Air Lines, Pacific Western Airlines, Quebecair, South Pacific Island Airways, Time Air, Transair, Trans Australia Airlines (TAA), Wardair and Wien Air Alaska. In many cases, the excellent operating economics of the Twin Otter allowed airlines large and small to provide scheduled passenger flights to communities that most likely would otherwise never have received air service.

Twin Otters are also a staple of Antarctic transportation. Four Twin Otters are employed by the British Antarctic Survey on research and supply flights, and several are employed by the United States Antarctic Program via contract with Kenn Borek Air. On 24–25 April 2001, two Twin Otters performed the first winter flight to Amundsen–Scott South Pole Station to perform a medical evacuation.

On 21–22 June 2016, Kenn Borek Air's Twin Otters performed the third winter evacuation flight to Amundsen–Scott South Pole Station to remove two people for medical reasons.

The Argentine Air Force has used the Twin Otter in Antarctica since the 1970s, with at least one of them deployed year-round at Marambio Base. The Chilean Air Force has operated the type since 1980, usually having an example based at Presidente Frei Antarctic base of the South Shetland Islands.

Alfredo Stroessner, Paraguayan head of state from 1954 until 1989, used a Twin Otter as a presidential aircraft; although the Twin Otter remained in the Paraguayan Air Force inventory after he was deposed, subsequent presidents switched to other, private aircraft for official duties.

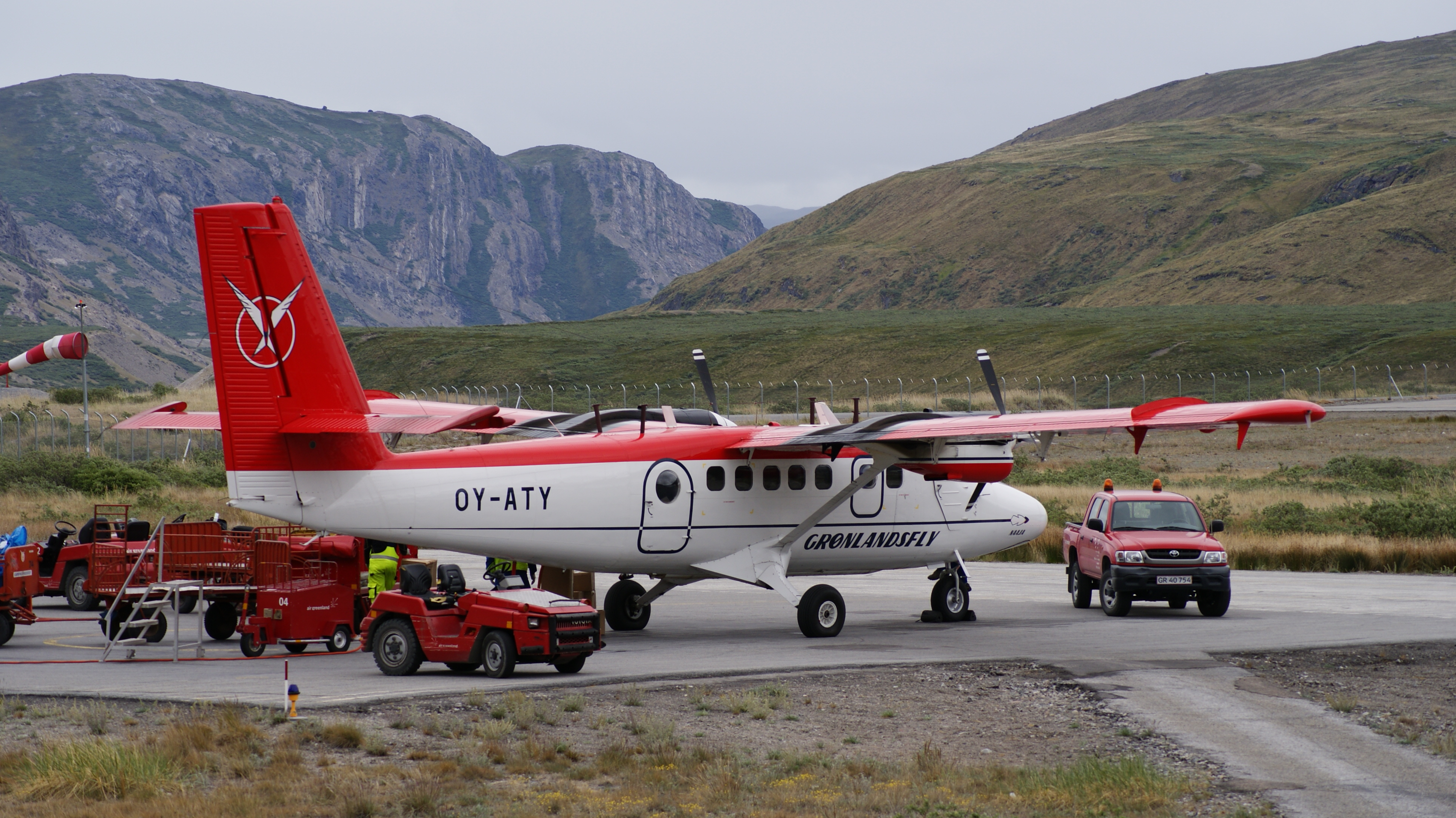
An Air Greenland Twin Otter at Kangerlussuaq Airport

As of August 2006, a total of 584 Twin Otter aircraft (all variants) remained in service worldwide. Major operators at the time included: Libyan Arab Airlines, Maldivian Air Taxi, Trans Maldivian Airways, Kenn Borek Air, and Grand Canyon Scenic Airlines. Some 115 airlines operated smaller numbers of the aircraft including Yeti Airlines in Nepal, Malaysia Airlines (which used the Twin Otter exclusively for passenger and freight transportation to the Kelabit Highlands region in Sarawak), and in the United Kingdom, the Scottish airline, Loganair which uses the aircraft to service the island of Barra in the Outer Hebrides. This daily scheduled service is unique as the aircraft lands on the beach and the schedule is partly influenced by the tide tables. Trials at Barra Airport with heavier planes than the Twin Otter, like the Short 360, failed because they sank in the sand. The Twin Otter is also used for landing at Juancho E. Yrausquin Airport, the world's shortest commercial runway, on the Caribbean island of Saba, Netherlands Antilles.

The Twin Otter has been popular with commercial skydiving operations. It can carry up to 22 skydivers to over 17,000 ft (5,200 m), which is a large load compared to most other aircraft in the industry. Presently, the Twin Otter is used in skydiving operations in many countries. The United States Air Force operates three Twin Otters for the United States Air Force Academy's skydiving team.

On 26 April 2001, the first ever air rescue during polar winter from the South Pole occurred with a ski-equipped Twin Otter operated by Kenn Borek Air.

On 25 September 2008, the Series 400 Technology Demonstrator achieved "power on" status in advance of an official rollout. The first flight of the Series 400 technical demonstrator, C-FDHT, took place 1 October 2008, at Victoria International Airport.

Two days later, the aircraft departed Victoria, British Columbia for a ferry flight to Orlando, Florida, site of the 2008 National Business Aviation Association (NBAA) Conference and exhibition. The first new build Series 400 Twin Otter (SN 845) made its first flight on 16 February 2010, in Calgary, Alberta. Transport Canada presented Viking Air Limited with an amended DHC-6 Type Certificate including the Series 400 on 21 July 2010. Six years after, in July 2016, 100 series 400 have been delivered to 34 customers operating in 29 countries.

By June 2017, around 125 planes had been made since restarting production in 2010.

== Variants ==
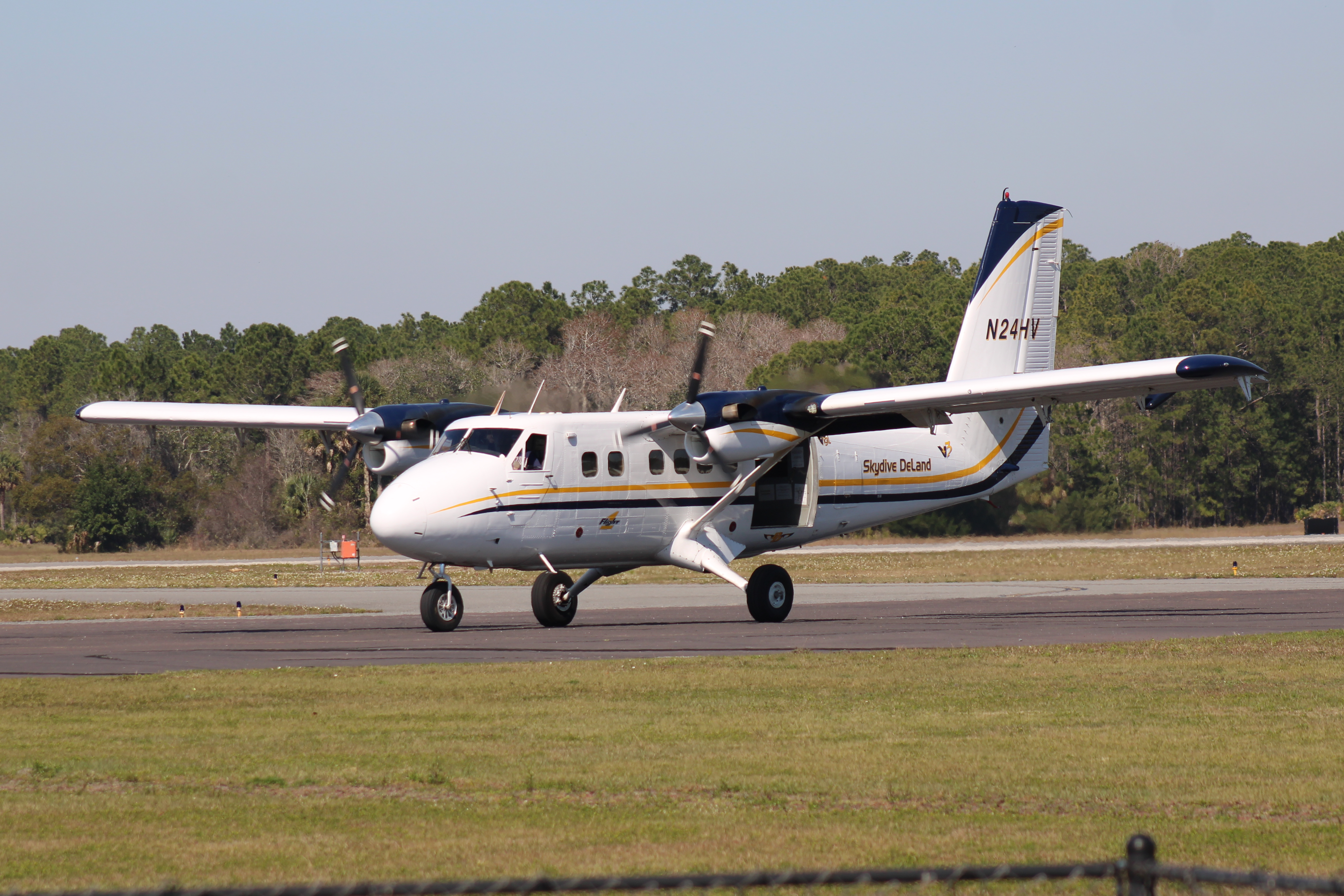
Short-nosed DHC-6-100 Twin Otter at DeLand Municipal Airport

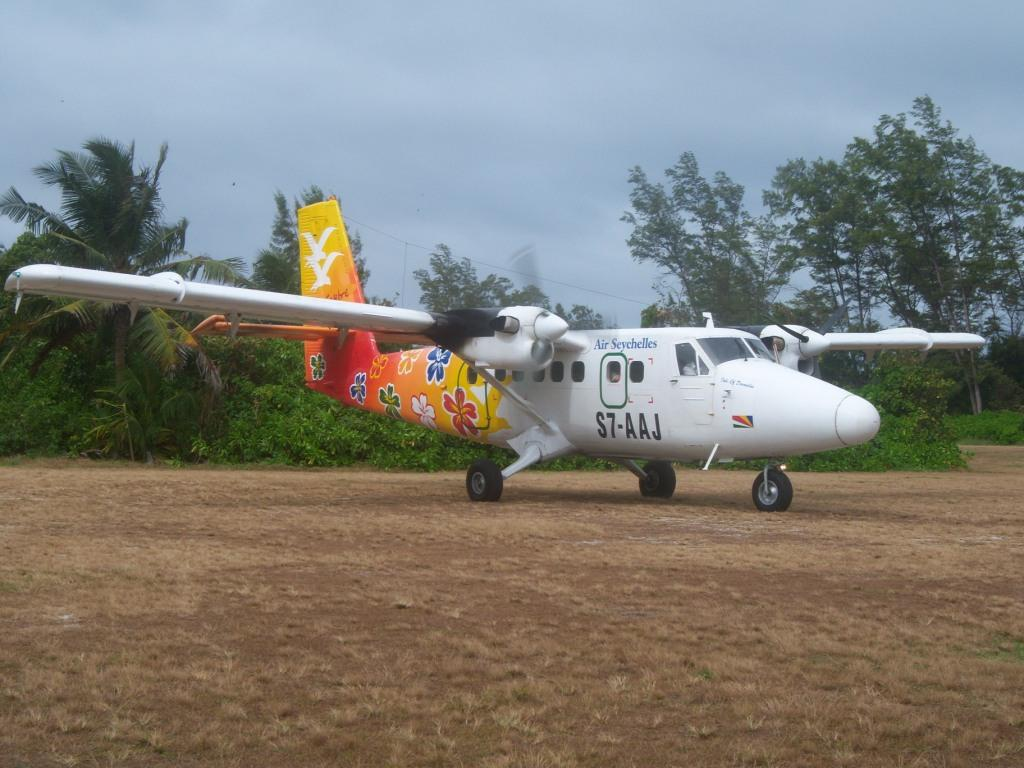
Air Seychelles de Havilland Canada DHC-6-300 Twin Otter on Bird Island, Seychelles

A Seaborne Airlines DHC-6-300 fitted with floats makes a water landing at Saint Thomas, U.S. Virgin Islands.

DHC-6 Series 100
Twin-engine STOL utility transport aircraft, powered by two 550 shp (410 kW) Pratt & Whitney PT6A-20 turboprop engines.
DHC-6 Series 110
Variant of the Series 100 built to conform to BCAR (British Civil Air Regulations).
DHC-6 Series 200
Improved version.
DHC-6 Series 300
Twin-engine STOL utility transport aircraft, powered by two 680 shp (510 kW) (715 ESHP) Pratt & Whitney Canada PT6A-27 turboprop engines.
DHC-6 Series 300M
Multi-role military transport aircraft. Two of these were produced as "proof-of-concept" demonstrators. Both have since been reverted to Series 300 conformity.
DHC-6 Series 310
Variant of the Series 300 built to conform to BCAR (British Civil Air Regulations).
DHC-6 Series 320
Variant of the Series 300 built to conform to Australian Civil Air Regulations.
DHC-6 Series 300S
Six demonstrator aircraft fitted with eleven seats, wing spoilers and an anti-skid braking system. All have since been reverted to Series 300 conformity.
Viking Air DHC-6 Series 400
Viking Air production, first delivered in July 2010, powered by two Pratt & Whitney Canada PT6A-34 engines, and available on standard landing gear, straight floats, amphibious floats, skis, wheel skis, or intermediate flotation landing gear ("tundra tires") and a Honeywell glass cockpit flight deck.
Viking Air DHC-6 Series 400S Seaplane - never produced
Viking Air seventeen-seat seaplane version of the Series 400 with twin floats and corrosion-resistance measures for the airframe, engines and fuels system. Customer deliveries planned from early 2017. 500 lb (230 kg) lighter than the 400.
DHC-6 Classic 300-G
Updated DHC-6 Series 400, with an all-new interior and new Garmin glass cockpit flight deck.
CC-138
Twin-engine STOL utility transport, search and rescue aircraft for the Canadian Armed Forces Search and Rescue operations. Based on the Series 300 aircraft.
UV-18A
Twin-engine STOL utility transport aircraft for the Alaska National Guard. Six built. It has been replaced by the Short C-23 Sherpa in United States Army service. In 2019 the United States Naval Research Laboratory added a UV-18A to the Scientific Development Squadron One (VXS-1) inventory.
UV-18B
Parachute training aircraft for the United States Air Force Academy. The United States Air Force Academy's 98th Flying Training Squadron maintains three UV-18s in its inventory as free-fall parachuting training aircraft, and by the Academy Parachute Team, the Wings of Blue, for year-round parachuting operations. Based on the Series 300 aircraft.
UV-18C
United States Army designation for three Viking Air Series 400s delivered in 2013.

== Operators ==
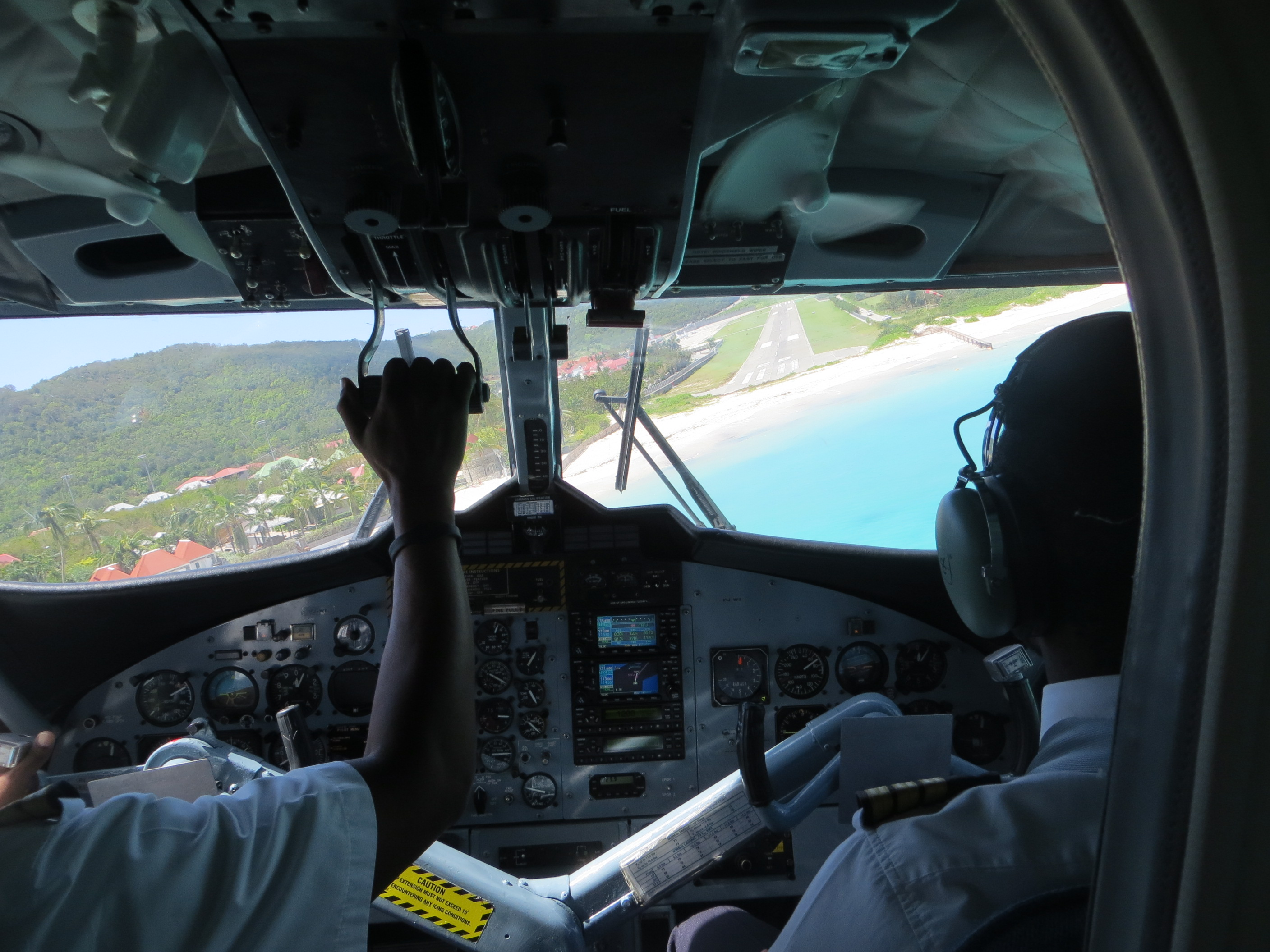
DHC-6 Cockpit view landing at St Barths

In 2016, there were 281 Twin Otters in airline service with 26 new aircraft on order: 112 in North/South America, 106 in Asia Pacific and Middle East (16 orders), 38 in Europe (10 orders) and 25 in Africa.

In 2018, a total of 270 Twin Otters were in airline service, and 14 on order: 111 in North/South America, 117 in the Asia Pacific and Middle East (14 orders), 26 in Europe and 13 in Africa.

In 2020, there were a total of 315 Twin Otters worldwide with 220 in service, 95 in storage and 8 on order. By region there were 22 in Africa, 142 in Asia Pacific (8 orders), 37 in Europe, 4 in the Middle East and 110 in the Americas.

The Twin Otter has been popular not only with bush operators as a replacement for the single-engine de Havilland Canada DHC-3 Otter but also with other civil and military customers, with over 890 aircraft built. Many commuter airlines in the United States got their start by flying the Twin Otter in scheduled passenger operations.

Airlines with six aircraft or more (2020)
Operator	Total	In service	Stored	Country
Trans Maldivian Airways	84	75	9	Maldives
Kenn Borek Air	15	11	4	Canada
Grand Canyon Airlines	13	6	7	United States
Maldivian	11	10	1	Maldives
Transwest Air	9	9	0	Canada
Zimex Aviation	9	7	2	Switzerland
AeroGeo	8	0	8	Russia
Air Borealis (PAL Airlines)	8	8	0	Canada
Air Adelphi	7	6	1	Saint Vincent and the Grenadines
Air Inuit	7	7	0	Canada
LADE	7	5	2	Argentina
Airfast Indonesia	6	6	0	Indonesia
Aviastar Mandiri	6	5	1	Indonesia
Manta Air	6	5	1	Maldives
AirBorneo	6	2	4	Malaysia
Merpati	6	0	6	Indonesia

== Accidents and incidents ==
Accidents with fatalities
Date	Flight	Fatalities	Location	Country	Event
23 November 1968	Cable Commuter Airlines	9	Santa Ana, California	United States	While landing, impacted light pole in fog, 1.8 mi (2.9 km) short of John Wayne Airport.
29 June 1972	Air Wisconsin Flight 671	8	Lake Winnebago, Wisconsin	United States	Collided mid-air with a North Central Airlines Convair 580 carrying five, killing all.
5 January 1975	Argentine Army Aviation	13	Tucumán Province	Argentina	Crashed due to bad weather and lack of a flight plan.
9 January 1975	Golden West Airlines Flight 261	12	Whittier, California	United States	Collided with a Cessna 150, also killing its two occupants
30 September 1975	Northern Thunderbird Air	7	Kluatantan, British Columbia	Canada	Struck a 5,200 foot mountain ridge shortly after takeoff.
3 May 1976	Demonstration	11	Monze Air Force Base, Monze	Zambia	Crashed on takeoff
12 December 1976	Allegheny Commuter Flight 977	3	Cape May Airport, New Jersey	United States	Crashed short of the runway
14 January 1977	Pacific Western Airlines Flight 405	12	Northwest Regional Airport Terrace-Kitimat, British Columbia	Canada	Crashed into mountain on approach.
18 January 1978	Frontier Airlines	3	Pueblo, Colorado	United States	Crashed during a training flight
2 September 1978	Airwest Airlines	11	Coal Harbour, British Columbia	Canada	Approach loss of control after a corroded rod failed and a flap retracted
18 November 1978	Jonestown cult rescue		Port Kaituma	Guyana	Attacked by cultists while rescuing people; aircraft was disabled after gunshots damaged one of the engine's fuel control modules and tires
4 December 1978	Rocky Mountain Airways Flight 217	2	Buffalo Pass, Colorado	United States	Survivable impact on snow, severe icing and mountain-wave downdraft
30 May 1979	Downeast Airlines Flight 46	17	Rockland, Maine	United States	Departed from Boston, crashed 1.2 mi (1.9 km) away from Knox County Regional Airport
17 June 1979	Air New England Flight 248	1	Yarmouth, Massachusetts	United States	Controlled flight into terrain (CFIT) into a heavily wooden forest during approach.
24 July 1981	Air Madagascar Flight 112	19	Maroantsetra	Madagascar	Controlled flight into terrain (CFIT) into a mountain in cloudy conditions
31 July 1981	Panamanian Air Force FAP-205	7	Coclé Province	Panama	Killed President Omar Torrijos, cause disputed
21 February 1982	Pilgrim Airlines Flight 458	1	Scituate Reservoir, Rhode Island	United States	Emergency landing after a fire broke out on board
11 March 1982	Widerøe Flight 933	15	Barents Sea near Gamvik	Norway	A mechanical fault in the elevator control system caused the pilots to lose control of pitch
14 June 1986	RCAF Twin Otter 13807	8	Cox Hill, Alberta	Canada	Crashed due to illusion whilst searching for a missing aircraft.
18 June 1986	Grand Canyon Airlines Flight 6	20	Grand Canyon, Arizona	United States	Collided with a Helitech Bell 206, also killing its five occupants
4 August 1986	LIAT Flight 319	13	St. Vincent	St. Vincent and the Grenadines	Crashed into the Caribbean Sea. The aircraft was en route between St. Lucia and St. Vincent when it crashed due to poor weather conditions, while on approach.
28 October 1989	Aloha IslandAir Flight 1712	20	Molokai, Hawaii	United States	Crashed into a mountain on approach to Molokai Airport.
12 April 1990	Widerøe Flight 839	5	outside Værøy	Norway	Crashed in the ocean due to wind
22 April 1992	Perris Valley Aviation	16	Perris Valley Airport, California	United States	Fuel contamination, lost power and crashed near the runway end
27 October 1993	Widerøe Flight 744	6	east of Namsos	Norway	Controlled flight into terrain into forest on a hill during approach at night in bad weather
17 December 1994	Mission Aviation Fellowship	28		Papua New Guinea	Crashed en route, striking a mountain at 6,400 ft (2,000 m).
10 January 1995	Merpati Nusantara Airlines Flight 6715	14	Molo Strait	Indonesia	Disappeared in bad weather from Sultan Muhammad Salahudin Airport to Frans Sales Lega Airport, Ruteng.
30 November 1996	ACES Colombia Flight 148	14	near Medellín	Colombia	Crashed 5 mi (8 km) from Olaya Herrera Airport
7 January 1997	Polynesian Airlines Flight 211	3	Mount Vaea	Samoa	Controlled flight into terrain in bad weather while diverting to Faleolo International Airport from Pago Pago to Apia
27 July 2000	2000 Royal Nepal Airlines Twin Otter crash	25	Jogbuda	Nepal	Crashed in mountain, killing all on board.
24 March 2001	Air Caraïbes Flight 1501	19	Saint Barthélemy	French West Indies	Crashed near Gustaf III Airport, killing one on ground.
22 August 2002	2002 Shangri-La Air Twin Otter crash	18	Pokhara	Nepal	CFIT in mountain 3 mi (5 km) south-east of Pokhara Airport, killing all on board.
26 May 2006	Air São Tomé and Príncipe training flight	4	Ana Chaves Bay, São Tomé Island	São Tomé and Príncipe	Airline's sole aircraft, registered S9-BAL, crashed during training flight.
21 June 2006	2006 Yeti Airlines Twin Otter crash	9	Jumla	Nepal	CFIT, have stalled, crashed eastern edge a runway in Jumla Airport, killing all on board.
9 August 2007	Air Moorea Flight 1121	20	Mo'orea	French Polynesia	Bound for Tahiti, crashed shortly after takeoff near Moorea Airport
6 May 2007	French Air and Space Force	9	Sinai Peninsula	Egypt	Crashed while supporting the Multinational Force and Observers
8 October 2008	Yeti Airlines Flight 101	18	Lukla	Nepal	Destroyed on landing at Tenzing-Hillary Airport
2 August 2009	Merpati Nusantara Airlines Flight 9760D	16	near Oksibil	Indonesia	Crashed about 14 mi (22 km) north of Oksibil.
11 August 2009	Airlines PNG Flight 4684	13	Kokoda Valley	Papua New Guinea	Crashed on a mountain whilst en route from Port Moresby to Kokoda.
15 December 2010	2010 Tara Air Twin Otter crash	22	Bilandu Forest	Nepal	A Tara Air Twin Otter crashed after take-off on a domestic flight from Lamidanda to Kathmandu, Nepal
20 January 2011	Ecuadorian Air Force	6	El Capricho	Ecuador	En route from Río Amazonas Airport to Mayor Galo de la Torre Airport
22 September 2011	Arctic Sunwest Charters	2	Yellowknife, Northwest Territories	Canada	Float plane crashed in the street, injuring seven.
23 January 2013	Kenn Borek Air	3	Mount Elizabeth	Antarctica	Skiplane lost en route from the South Pole to Terra Nova Bay.
10 October 2013	MASwings Flight 3002	2	Kudat	Malaysia	Crashed on landing at Kudat Airport
16 February 2014	Nepal Airlines Flight 183	18	Arghakhanchi District	Nepal	En route to Jumla from Pokhara.
20 September 2014	Hevilift	4	near Port Moresby	Papua New Guinea	Crashed on landing
24 February 2016	Tara Air Flight 193	23	Pokhara	Nepal	Tara Air crashed after takeoff
2 October 2015	Aviastar Flight 7503	10	Luwu Regency	Indonesia	Aviastar pilot deviated from his route to Makassar
30 August 2018	Ethiopian Air Force	18	near Mojo	Ethiopia	From Dire Dawa, crashed at a place called Nannawa
18 September 2019	PT Carpediem Aviasi Mandiri	4	Papua	Indonesia	From Timika, crashed at Hoeya district
29 May 2022	Tara Air Flight 197	22	Mustang District	Nepal	Crashed after takeoff from Pokhara Airport
20 May 2023	[not listed]	2	Half Moon Bay, California	United States	Crashed into Half Moon Bay, California
27 December 2023	Air Tindi Flight	0	Northwest Territories	Canada	Crashed 190 mi (300 km) NE of Yellowknife
20 October 2024	SAM Air	4	Pohuwato Regency	Indonesia	Crashed while attempting to land at Panua Airport in Pohuwato Regency, Gorontalo.
25 April 2025	Royal Thai Police	6	Phetchaburi Province	Thailand	Crashed into the sea near Hua Hin Airport.

== Specifications ==
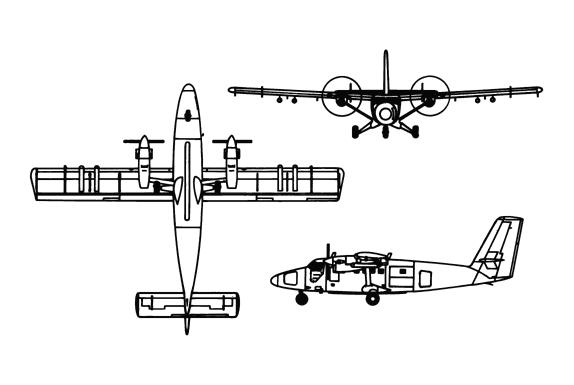
de Havilland Canada DHC-6 Twin Otter three-view drawing

Series	100	300	400
Cockpit crew	1–2		
Seating	20		19
Length	49 ft 6 in (15.09 m)	51 ft 9 in (15.77 m)	
Height	19 ft 6 in (5.94 m)		
Wing	65 ft 0 in (19.81 m) span, 420 sq ft (39 m^{2}) area (10.05 AR)		
Empty weight	5,850 lb (2,650 kg)	7,415 lb (3,363 kg)	7,100 lb (3,200 kg) (no accommodation)
MTOW	10,500 lb (4,800 kg)	12,500 lb (5,700 kg) (Note: military -400: 14,000 lb (6,400 kg))	
Payload	2,150 lb (980 kg) over 727 nmi (837 mi; 1,346 km)	2,500 lb (1,100 kg) over 700 nmi (810 mi; 1,300 km); 1,900 lb (860 kg) over 920 nmi (1,700 km; 1,060 mi) (Note: 89 US gal (74 imp gal; 340 L) optional wingtip tank for 3,190 lb (1,450 kg) of fuel)	4,061 lb (1,842 kg) over 100 nmi (190 km; 120 mi); 3,031 lb (1,375 kg) over 400 nmi (460 mi; 740 km)
Fuel capacity			378 US gal (315 imp gal; 1,430 L), 2,590 lb (1,170 kg)
Turboprops (×2)	P&WC PT6A-20	PT6A-27	PT6A-34
Unit Power	578 shp (431 kW)	620 shp (460 kW)	559 kW (750 hp)
Max. Cruise	160 kn (180 mph; 300 km/h)	182 kn (209 mph; 337 km/h)	182 kn (209 mph; 337 km/h) (FL100)
Takeoff to 50 ft (15 m)			STOL 1,200 ft (370 m); CTOL 1,490 ft (450 m);
Landing from 50 ft			STOL 1,050 ft (320 m); CTOL 1,510 ft (460 m);
Stall Speed	65 mph (56 kn; 105 km/h)		
Ferry Range	771 nmi (887 mi; 1,428 km)		799 nmi (919 mi; 1,480 km) (Note: 989 nmi (1,138 mi; 1,832 km) ferry range or 8.76 hours of endurance with optional wingtip tanks)
Endurance			6.94 hours
Ceiling	25,000 ft (7,600 m)		
Climb rate		1,600 ft/min (8.1 m/s)	
FL100 fuel burn 146 kn (168 mph; 270 km/h)			468.2 lb/h (212.4 kg/h); 0.311 nmi/lb (0.358 mi/lb; 1.27 km/kg)
Power/mass	0.11 hp/lb (0.18 kW/kg)	0.1 hp/lb (0.16 kW/kg)	0.12 hp/lb (0.20 kW/kg)

== See also ==
Related development

- de Havilland Canada DHC-3 Otter
- de Havilland Canada Dash 7

Aircraft of comparable role, configuration, and era

- Antonov An-28
- Britten-Norman Trislander
- CASA C-212 Aviocar
- Dornier 228
- Embraer EMB 110 Bandeirante
- GAF Nomad N24
- Harbin Y-12
- IAI Arava
- Indonesian Aerospace N-219
- Let L-410 Turbolet
- PZL M28 Skytruck
- Short SC.7 Skyvan
