= Panua Pohuwato Airport =

Panua Pohuwato Airport Bandara Pohuwato Panua
- IATA: PWX; ICAO: WAFZ; WMO: -

Summary
- Airport type: Public
- Owner: Indonesian Government
- Operator: Ministry of Transport
- Serves: Pohuwato Regency
- Location: Gorontalo, Indonesia
- Time zone: Central Indonesia Time (UTC+08:00)
- Elevation AMSL: 18 m (59 ft)
- Coordinates: 00°27′53″N 121°49′06″E

Map
- The airport location in Gorontalo / Indonesia Panua (Indonesia)

Runways
Direction	Length		Surface
Direction	m	ft	Surface
	1,200	3,937	Asphalt

Panua Pohuwato Airport (IATA:PWX, ICAO:WAFZ) is an airport located in Pohuwato Regency, Gorontalo, Indonesia. This airport is situated approximately 31 km west of Marisa, the capital city of Pohuwato Regency.

== History ==
Panua Pohuwato Airport construction was started in 2015 with a budget of approximately 437 billion IDR. The airport was completed in 2024 and inaugurated by Joko Widodo on 22 April 2024.

== Specification ==
Panua Pohuwato Airport has a runway measuring 1,200 m x 30 m, equipped with a taxiway and an apron. The passenger terminal building covers an area of approximately 990 m^{2}.

== Airlines and destinations ==
Airlines	Destinations
Susi Air	Gorontalo

== Incidents ==
- On 20 October 2024, a SAM Air DHC-6 Twin Otter aircraft with registration PK-SMH crashed while attempting to land at Panua Airport in Pohuwato Regency, Gorontalo. All four people on board died.
