= Khalanga =

Khalanga may refer to several places in Nepal:

- Khalanga, Baitadi
- Khalanga, Dadeldhura
- Khalanga, Dailekh
- Khalanga, Darchula
- Khalanga, Jajarkot
- Khalanga, Salyan
