= Dhatal =

Dhatal धताल
- Village development committee
- Country: Nepal
- Zone: Mahakali Zone
- District: Dadeldhura District

Population (1991)
  - Total: 3,571
- Time zone: UTC+5:45 (Nepal Time)

Dhatal is a village development committee in Dadeldhura District in the Mahakali Zone of western Nepal. At the time of the 1991 Nepal census it had a population of 3571 people living in 612 individual households.
