= Belapur =

Belapur may refer to:

- Belapur Fort, a medieval coastal fort in Navi Mumbai, Maharashtra, India; near Mumbai
  - Belapur Assembly constituency, Maharashtra Legislative Assembly
  - CBD Belapur, business district of Navi Mumbai
    - CBD Belapur railway station
- Belapur, Nepal, a village in Sudurpashchim Province, Nepal
- Belapur, Shrirampur, a village in Shrirampur taluka Maharashtra, India

== See also ==
- Belapur railway station (disambiguation)
