= Popayato =

- Location in Gorontalo and Indonesia Popayato (Indonesia)
- Coordinates: 0°30′44.4996″N 121°29′31.7688″E
- Country: Indonesia
- Province: Gorontalo
- Regency: Pohuwato Regency
- District: Popayato District
- Elevation: 3.3 ft (1 m)

Population (2010)
  - Total: 978
- Time zone: UTC+8 (Indonesia Central Standard Time)

Popayato is a village in Popayato district, Pohuwato Regency in Gorontalo province. Its population is 978.

== Climate ==
Popayato has a tropical rainforest climate (Af) with heavy to rainfall year-round.

Climate data for Popayato
Month	Jan	Feb	Mar	Apr	May	Jun	Jul	Aug	Sep	Oct	Nov	Dec	Year
Mean daily maximum °C (°F)	30.8 (87.4)	30.8 (87.4)	31.1 (88.0)	31.5 (88.7)	31.5 (88.7)	30.8 (87.4)	30.4 (86.7)	31.3 (88.3)	31.6 (88.9)	32.3 (90.1)	31.9 (89.4)	31.3 (88.3)	31.3 (88.3)
Daily mean °C (°F)	26.8 (80.2)	26.8 (80.2)	27.0 (80.6)	27.2 (81.0)	27.4 (81.3)	26.8 (80.2)	26.3 (79.3)	26.9 (80.4)	26.9 (80.4)	27.4 (81.3)	27.4 (81.3)	27.2 (81.0)	27.0 (80.6)
Mean daily minimum °C (°F)	22.8 (73.0)	22.8 (73.0)	22.9 (73.2)	23.0 (73.4)	23.4 (74.1)	22.9 (73.2)	22.3 (72.1)	22.6 (72.7)	22.3 (72.1)	22.6 (72.7)	23.0 (73.4)	23.1 (73.6)	22.8 (73.0)
Average precipitation mm (inches)	185 (7.3)	176 (6.9)	154 (6.1)	186 (7.3)	220 (8.7)	257 (10.1)	258 (10.2)	177 (7.0)	166 (6.5)	155 (6.1)	175 (6.9)	156 (6.1)	2,265 (89.2)
Source: Climate-Data.org
