= Sirsha =

Sirsha may refer to:

- Sirsha, India
- Sirsha, Nepal
