= Manilek =

Manilek मणिलेक
- Village development committee
- Location in Nepal
- Coordinates: 29.34°N 80.67°E
- Country: Nepal
- Zone: Mahakali Zone
- District: Dadeldhura District

Population (2011)
  - Total: 4,323
  - Density: 236.6/km^{2} (613/sq mi)
- Time zone: UTC+5:45 (Nepal Time)

Manilek is a village development committee in Dadeldhura District in the Mahakali Zone of western Nepal.

== Population ==
At the time of the 2011 Nepal census, it had a population of 4,323 people.
