= Mashtamandau =

Mashtamandau मष्टामाडौं
- Village development committee
- Location in Nepal
- Coordinates: 29.30°N 80.71°E
- Country: Nepal
- Zone: Mahakali Zone
- District: Dadeldhura District

Population (1991)
  - Total: 2,844
- Time zone: UTC+5:45 (Nepal Time)

Mashtamandau is a village development committee in Dadeldhura District in the Mahakali Zone of western Nepal. At the time of the 1991 Nepal census it had a population of 2844 people living in 525 individual households.
