= Koteli =

Koteli कोतेली
- Village development committee
- Location in Nepal
- Coordinates: 29.35°N 80.65°E
- Country: Nepal
- Zone: Mahakali Zone
- District: Dadeldhura District

Population (1991)
  - Total: 3,301
- Time zone: UTC+5:45 (Nepal Time)

Koteli is a village development committee in Dadeldhura District in the Mahakali Zone of western Nepal. At the time of the 1991 Nepal census it had a population of 3301 people living in 605 individual households.
