= Navadurga Rural Municipality =

Rural Municipality in Sudurpashchim Province, Nepal

Navadurga Rural Municipality नवदुर्गा गाउँपालिका
- Rural Municipality
- नवदुर्गा गाउँपालिका
- Coordinates: 29.35°N 80.70°E
- Country: Nepal
- Province: Sudurpashchim Province
- District: Dadeldhura District

Government
  - Type: Local government
  - Chairperson: Laxmi Datta Awasthi
  - Administrative Head: Pushpa Raj Joshi

Area
  - Total: 141.89 km^{2} (54.78 sq mi)

Population (2011 census)
  - Total: 19,957
  - Density: 140.65/km^{2} (364.28/sq mi)
- Time zone: UTC+05:45 (Nepal Standard Time)
- Website: http://navadurgamun.gov.np

Navadurga (Nepali: नवदुर्गा) is a Gaupalika in Dadeldhura District in the Sudurpashchim Province of far-western Nepal. Navadurga has a population of 19957. The land area is 141.89 km^{2}. It was formed by merging Koteli, Manilek, Navadurga and Belapur VDCs.
