= Ganeshpur, Dadeldhura =

Ganeshpur गणेशपुर
- Village development committee
- Location in Nepal
- Coordinates: 29.28°N 80.67°E
- Country: Nepal
- Zone: Mahakali Zone
- District: Dadeldhura District

Population (1991)
  - Total: 3,412
- Time zone: UTC+5:45 (Nepal Time)

Ganeshpur is a village development committee in Dadeldhura District in the Mahakali Zone of western Nepal. At the time of the 1991 Nepal census it had a population of 3412 people living in 649 individual households.
