= Ajayameru =

Place in Nepal

Ajayameru अजयमेरु
- Gaunpalika
- Location in Nepal
- Coordinates: 29.38°N 80.60°E
- Country: Nepal
- Province: Sudurpashchim Province
- District: Dadeldhura District

Population (2021)
  - Total: 15,161
- Time zone: UTC+5:45 (Nepal Time)
- Postal Code: 10309

Ajayameru is a former village development committee that is now a Rural Municipality in Dadeldhura District in Sudurpashchim Province of western Nepal. It was a Capital of Doti kingdom founded by Niranjan dev in the 11th century. At the time of the 1991 Nepal census it had a population of 3930 people living in 737 individual households.
