= Bhageshwar Rural Municipality =

Bhageshwar Rural Municipality भागेश्वर गाउँपालिका
- Rural Municipality
- भागेश्वर गाउँपालिका Bhageshwar Rural Municipality (Nepal)
- Coordinates: 29.281°N 80.406°E
- Country: Nepal
- Province: Sudurpashchim Province
- District: Dadeldhura District

Government
  - Type: Local government
  - Chairperson: Ms. Kausila K. Bhatta
  - Administrative head: Harsa Bahadur Roka

Area
  - Total: 233.38 km^{2} (90.11 sq mi)

Population (2011 census)
  - Total: 14,129
  - Density: 60.541/km^{2} (156.80/sq mi)
- Time zone: UTC+05:45 (Nepal Standard Time)
- Website: http://bhageshwormun.gov.np

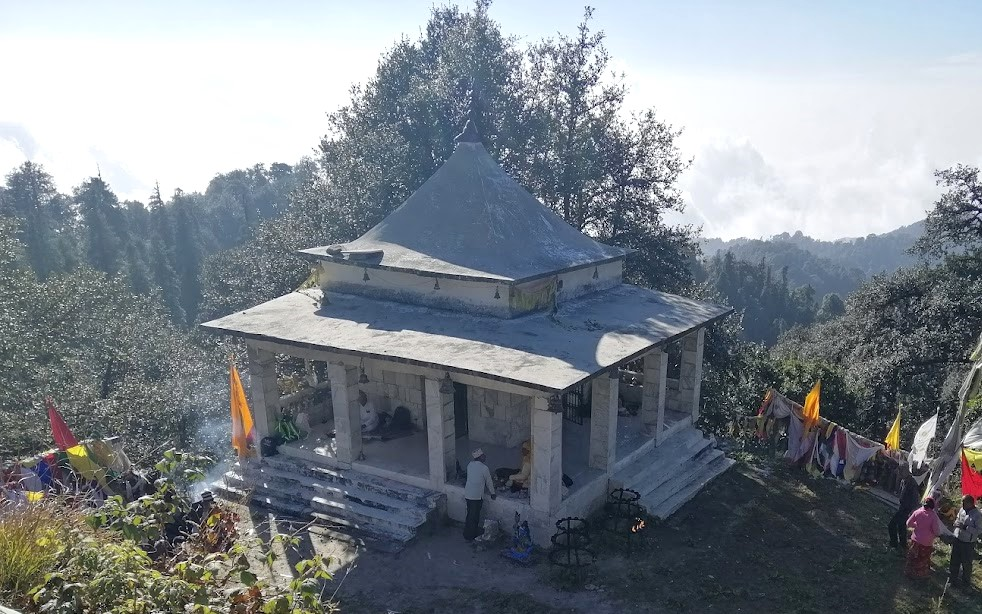
Bhageshwar Temple Dadeldhura, Nepal

Bhageshwar (Nepali: भागेश्वर) is a Gaupalika in Dadeldhura District in the Sudurpashchim Province of far-western Nepal. Bhageshwar has a population of 14129.The land area is 233.38 km^{2}.
