= Samaiji =

Samaiji समैजी
- Village development committee
- Location in Nepal
- Coordinates: 29.37°N 80.56°E
- Country: Nepal
- Zone: Mahakali Zone
- District: Dadeldhura District

Population (1991)
  - Total: 2,184
- Time zone: UTC+5:45 (Nepal Time)

Samaiji is a village development committee in Dadeldhura District in the Mahakali Zone of western Nepal. In the 1991 Nepal census it had a population of 2184 people living in 382 individual households.
