= Zimex Aviation =

Swiss airline

- Zimex Aviation ATR 72-201
IATA	ICAO	Call sign
XM / ZX	IMX / AZD	ZIMEX / Mailman
- Founded: 1969; 57 years ago (as an air operator)
- AOC #: CH.AOC.1025
- Hubs: EuroAirport Basel/Mulhouse/Freiburg
- Secondary hubs: Malmö, Stockholm–Arlanda, Gothenburg, Pristina, Sarajevo, Pointe-à-Pitre
- Fleet size: 16
- Destinations: 32
- Parent company: Zimex Austria (AZD)
- Headquarters: Zurich Airport; Glattbrugg, Switzerland
- Key people: Hannes Ziegler, founder Daniele Cereghetti, CEO
- Employees: 450
- Website: www.zimex.ch

Zimex Aviation Ltd. is an airline based in Glattbrugg, Switzerland. It provides aircraft leases worldwide to the oil, Express Cargo, Utility, VIP Charter, Charter and mining industries and to humanitarian organizations.

Zimex Aviation, furthermore, it is the oldest airline company in Switzerland (according FOCA)

Its main base is at EuroAirport Basel Mulhouse Freiburg and Maintenance (MRO) facility is located in St Gallen Airport, and at Sofia, Bulgaria.

Since 2021, Zimex Aviation has started operation as well for its Austria Division - Zimex Austria with ICAO Code: AZD.

Main operation at the moment are in place in Sweden operating for Postnord, Carousel in Germany operating out of Berlin, Frankfurt, and Hannover.

Some operations, as well, are conducted for BDA and ASL, serving routes out from Maastricht, Birmingham, Dublin, Prestwick, and Shannon.

Zimex, as well, operates on bi-weekly bases flights in and out from Basel to Pristina and Sarajevo on behalf of Swiss Army for troupe repositioning.

As per August 7th, 2023 operation in Sweden will be performed by Zimex using ICAO code JUP, and Callsign JumpAir.

== History ==
The airline was established and started operations in 1969. In October 1999, Zimex Aviation Group was sold to a Swiss investor group.

== Accidents and incidents ==
On October 14, 1987, a Lockheed L-100-30 - a civilian variant of the military transport plane C-130 Hercules - was shot down in Angola. It was operated on behalf of the International Committee of the Red Cross.

== Fleet ==
=== Current fleet ===
As of August 2025, Zimex Aviation operates the following aircraft:

Zimex Aviation fleet
Aircraft	In service	Dismiss	Orders	Passengers	Notes
ATR 42-300F	2	—	—	38	
ATR 42-500	1	—	—		
ATR 72-200F	2	—	—	—	
De Havilland DHC-6-300 Twin Otter	10	—			
De Havilland DHC-6-400 Twin Otter	1	—			
Total	16	0			

=== Fleet development ===
At the July 2010 Farnborough Air Show, Zimex took delivery of the first DHC-6 Twin Otter Series 400 produced by Viking Air

=== Former fleet ===
The airline previously operated the following aircraft:

- 1 Beechcraft 1900D
- 1 Pilatus PC6-B2/H4 Porter
