= Belapur railway station =

Belapur railway station may refer to:

- Belapur (BAP) railway station, Ahmednagar district, Maharashtra, India
- CBD Belapur railway station, Mumbai, India

== See also ==
- Belapur (disambiguation)
