= Gankhet =

Gankhet गनखेत
- Village development committee
- Location in Nepal
- Coordinates: 29.19°N 80.54°E
- Country: Nepal
- Zone: Mahakali Zone
- District: Dadeldhura District

Population (1991)
  - Total: 3,680
- Time zone: UTC+5:45 (Nepal Time)

Gankhet is a village development committee in Dadeldhura District in the Mahakali Zone of western Nepal. At the time of the 1991 Nepal census it had a population of 3680 people living in 600 individual households.
