= Alital =

Place in Nepal

Alital अलिताल
- Village development committee
- Location in Nepal
- Coordinates: 29.09°N 80.49°E
- Country: Nepal
- Province: Sudurpashchim
- District: Dadeldhura

Population (1991)
  - Total: 8,307
- Time zone: UTC+5:45 (Nepal Time)

Alital is a village development committee in Dadeldhura District in Sudurpashchim Province of western Nepal. At the time of the 1991 Nepal census it had a population of 8307 people living in 1401 individual households.
