= Bhageshwar =

Bhageshwar भागेश्वर
- Village development committee
- Location in Nepal
- Coordinates: 29.32°N 80.40°E
- Country: Nepal
- Province: Sudurpashchim Province
- District: Dadeldhura District

Population (1991)
  - Total: 3,402
- Time zone: UTC+5:45 (Nepal Time)

Bhageshwar is a village development committee in Dadeldhura District in the Sudurpashchim Province of western Nepal. At the time of the 1991 Nepal census it had a population of 3402 people living in 595 individual households.
