= Bhadrapur, Dadeldhura =

Bhadrapur भद्रपुर
- Village development committee
- Location in Nepal
- Coordinates: 29.36°N 80.52°E
- Country: Nepal
- Province: Sudurpashchim Province
- District: Dadeldhura District

Population (1991)
  - Total: 2,474
- Time zone: UTC+5:45 (Nepal Time)

Bhadrapur is a village development committee in Dadeldhura District in the Sudurpashchim Province of western Nepal. At the time of the 1991 Nepal census it had a population of 2474 people living in 430 individual households.
