= Kailapalmandau =

Kailapalmandau कैलापालमाण्डू
- Village development committee
- Interactive map of Kailapalmandau
- Coordinates: 29.17°N 80.44°E
- Country: Nepal
- Zone: Mahakali Zone
- District: Dadeldhura District

Population (1991)
  - Total: 3,344
- Time zone: UTC+5:45 (Nepal Time)

Kailapalmandau is a village development committee in Dadeldhura District in the Mahakali Zone of western Nepal. At the time of the 1991 Nepal census it had a population of 3344 people living in 694 individual households.
