= Sahastralinga =

Sahasralinga सहस्रलिङ्ग
- Village development committee
- Country: Nepal
- Zone: Mahakali Zone
- District: Dadeldhura District

Population (1991)
  - Total: 3,412
- Time zone: UTC+5:45 (Nepal Time)

Sahasralinga is a village development committee in Dadeldhura District in the Mahakali Zone of western Nepal. At the time of the 1991 Nepal census it had a population of 3412 people living in 657 individual households.

Sahasra is the correct prefix that means "a thousand", not SahasTra. However, it is invariably misspelled as the latter. Notice how the same prefix is spelled when referring to the crown chakra: "Sahasrara Chakra" or when it occurs in family names (example: Sahasrabuddhe) without a T. Also see Sahasralinga. The confusion arises because the Hindi letter "Sa" (स) merges with "ra" (र) and looks like "tra".
