= Marisa, Indonesia =

Coordinates: 0°27′0″N 121°56′48″E

Marisa is a town and administrative district in Gorontalo, Indonesia, and the regency seat of Pohuwato Regency. The district of Marisa had an estimated population of 21,043 in 2016.

== Climate ==
Marisa has a tropical rainforest climate (Af) with heavy rainfall year-round.

Climate data for Marisa
Month	Jan	Feb	Mar	Apr	May	Jun	Jul	Aug	Sep	Oct	Nov	Dec	Year
Mean daily maximum °C (°F)	30.7 (87.3)	30.8 (87.4)	31.1 (88.0)	31.6 (88.9)	31.6 (88.9)	30.9 (87.6)	30.5 (86.9)	31.3 (88.3)	31.7 (89.1)	32.3 (90.1)	32.0 (89.6)	31.3 (88.3)	31.3 (88.4)
Daily mean °C (°F)	26.6 (79.9)	26.7 (80.1)	26.9 (80.4)	27.3 (81.1)	27.5 (81.5)	26.9 (80.4)	26.4 (79.5)	26.8 (80.2)	26.9 (80.4)	27.4 (81.3)	27.5 (81.5)	27.1 (80.8)	27.0 (80.6)
Mean daily minimum °C (°F)	22.6 (72.7)	22.7 (72.9)	22.8 (73.0)	23.0 (73.4)	23.4 (74.1)	22.9 (73.2)	22.4 (72.3)	22.4 (72.3)	22.2 (72.0)	22.5 (72.5)	23.0 (73.4)	23.0 (73.4)	22.7 (72.9)
Average rainfall mm (inches)	181 (7.1)	172 (6.8)	156 (6.1)	173 (6.8)	189 (7.4)	242 (9.5)	247 (9.7)	170 (6.7)	140 (5.5)	135 (5.3)	166 (6.5)	153 (6.0)	2,124 (83.4)
Source: Climate-Data.org
