= Bagarkot =

Bagarkot बगरकोट
- Village development committee
- Location in Nepal
- Coordinates: 29.29°N 80.48°E
- Country: Nepal
- Province: Sudurpashchim Province
- District: Dadeldhura District

Population (1991)
  - Total: 3,658
- Time zone: UTC+5:45 (Nepal Time)

Bagarkot is a village development committee in south-west of Dadeldhura District in the Sudurpashchim Province of western Nepal. The population is about 6025 according to the census of 2008. At the time of the 1991 Nepal census it had a population of 3658 people living in 620 individual households.
