= Khalanga, Dadeldhura =

Khalanga खलङ्गा
- Village development committee
- Country: Nepal
- Province: Sudurpashchim Province
- District: Dadeldhura District

Population (1991)
  - Total: 3,253
- Time zone: UTC+5:45 (Nepal Time)

Khalanga is a village development committee in Dadeldhura District in the Sudurpashchim Province of western Nepal. At the time of the 1991 Nepal census it had a population of 3253 people living in 700 individual households.
