= Ketakeshwar Dewal =

Hindu temple in India

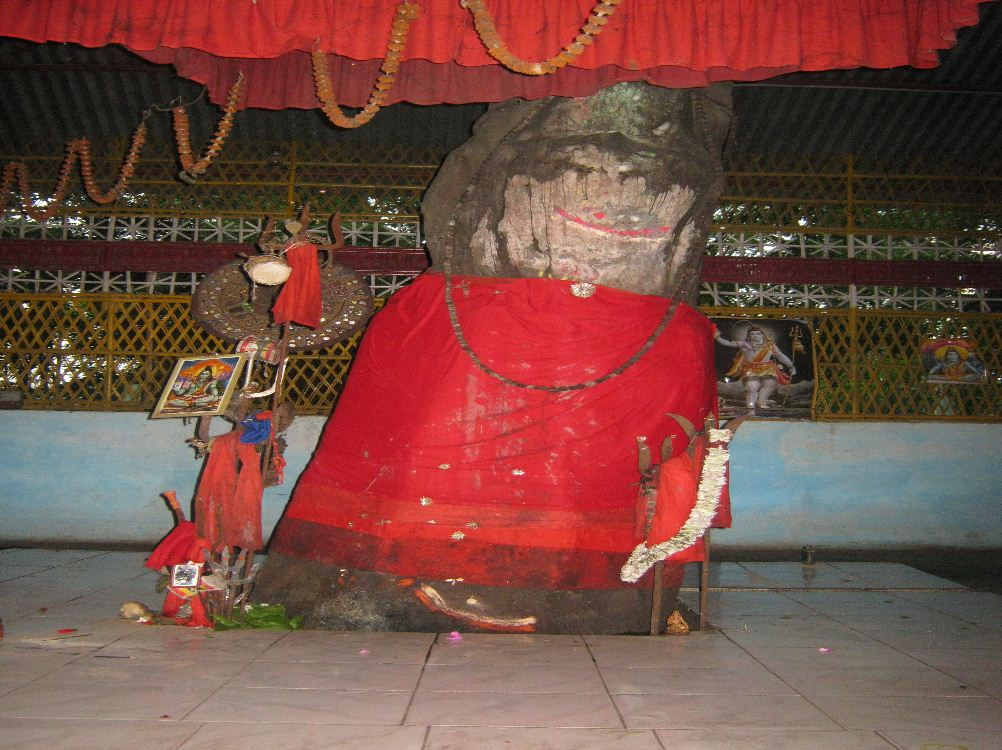
- The linga inside Ketekeswar Dewalaya

Religion
- Affiliation: Hinduism

Location
- Interactive map of Ketakeshwar Dewal
- Coordinates: 26.6488°N 92.7804°E

Ketakeshwar Dewal (shrine) is a holy site in the Ketakibari area of Tezpur in Assam, India. It is reputed to have one of the largest Shivalingas in the world.

The actual site has two parts - one part where the actual linga is located and another part a few metres away where the original base of the linga is located. Legend has it that during a severe earthquake in the past the linga was uprooted from its base and deposited where it currently stands.

This shrine is open to visitors and there is a local committee which oversees the development of the area around the site. Originally it was in the middle of bamboo groves with a small pathway for people to approach on foot. Recently there is a full shelter that has been built on the site for the protection of the holy area from the natural elements as well as for the devotees to assemble and offer their prayers.
