= Belapur, Nepal =

Belapur बेलापुर
- Village development committee
- Location in Nepal
- Coordinates: 29.37°N 80.74°E
- Country: Nepal
- Province: Sudurpashchim Province
- District: Dadeldhura District

Population (1991)
  - Total: 5,285
- Time zone: UTC+5:45 (Nepal Time)

Belapur is a village development committee in Dadeldhura District in Sudurpashchim Province of western Nepal. At the time of the 1991 Nepal census it had a population of 5285 people living in 928 individual households.
