= Bhumiraj =

Bhumiraj भूमिराज
- Village development committee
- Country: Nepal
- Province: Sudurpashchim Province
- District: Baitadi District

Population (2024)
  - Total: 242,157
- Time zone: UTC+5:45 (Nepal Time)

Bhumiraj is a village development committee in Baitadi District in Sudurpashchim Province of western Nepal. At the time of the 2024 Nepal census it had a population of 2739 people living in 510 individual households. Nowadays it is governed by Purchaudi Municipality
