= Dadeldhura District =

Coordinates: 29°18′0″N 80°35′0″E

डडेल्धुरा (Dadeldhura)
- District
- Dadeldhura District
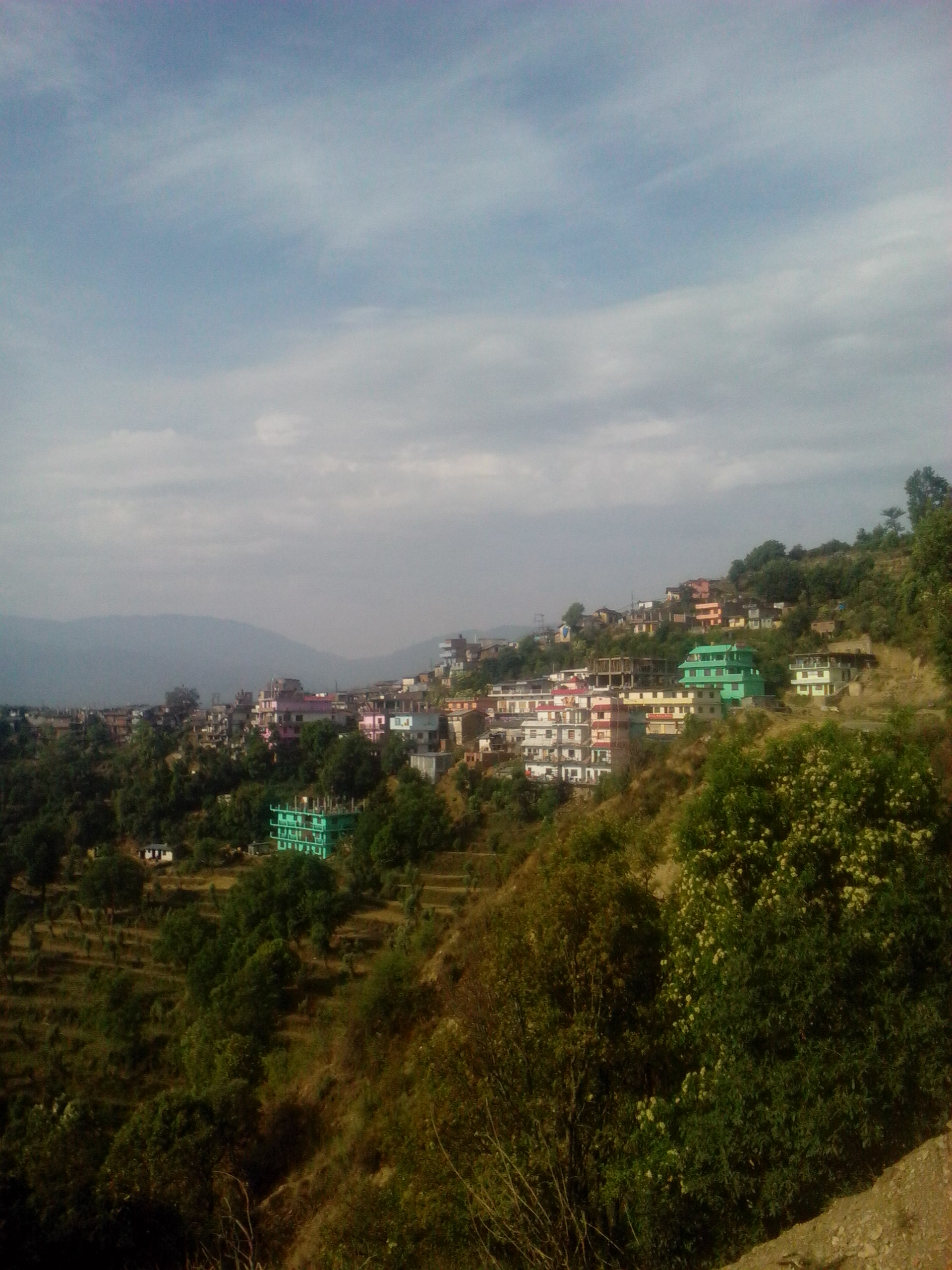
- Interactive map of डडेल्धुरा (Dadeldhura)
- Country: Nepal
- Province: Sudurpashchim Province
- Admin HQ.: Amargadhi

Government
  - Type: Coordination committee
  - Body: DCC, Dadeldhura
  - Chief District Officer: Mohan Raj Joshi
  - Administrative Officer: Hem Prasad Dhakal
  - Elected member of House of Representative: Sher Bahadur Deuba

Area
  - Total: 1,538 km^{2} (594 sq mi)

Population (2011)
  - Total: 142,094
  - Density: 92.39/km^{2} (239.3/sq mi)
- Time zone: UTC+05:45 (NPT)
- Main Language(s): Dotyali
- Other languages: Nepali, Magar

Dadeldhura (Nepali: डडेल्धुरा), a part of Sudurpashchim Province, is one of the seventy-seven districts of Nepal. The district, with Dadeldhura as its district headquarters, covers an area of 1,538 km^{2} (594 sq mi) and had a population of 126,162 in 2001 and 142,094 in 2011.

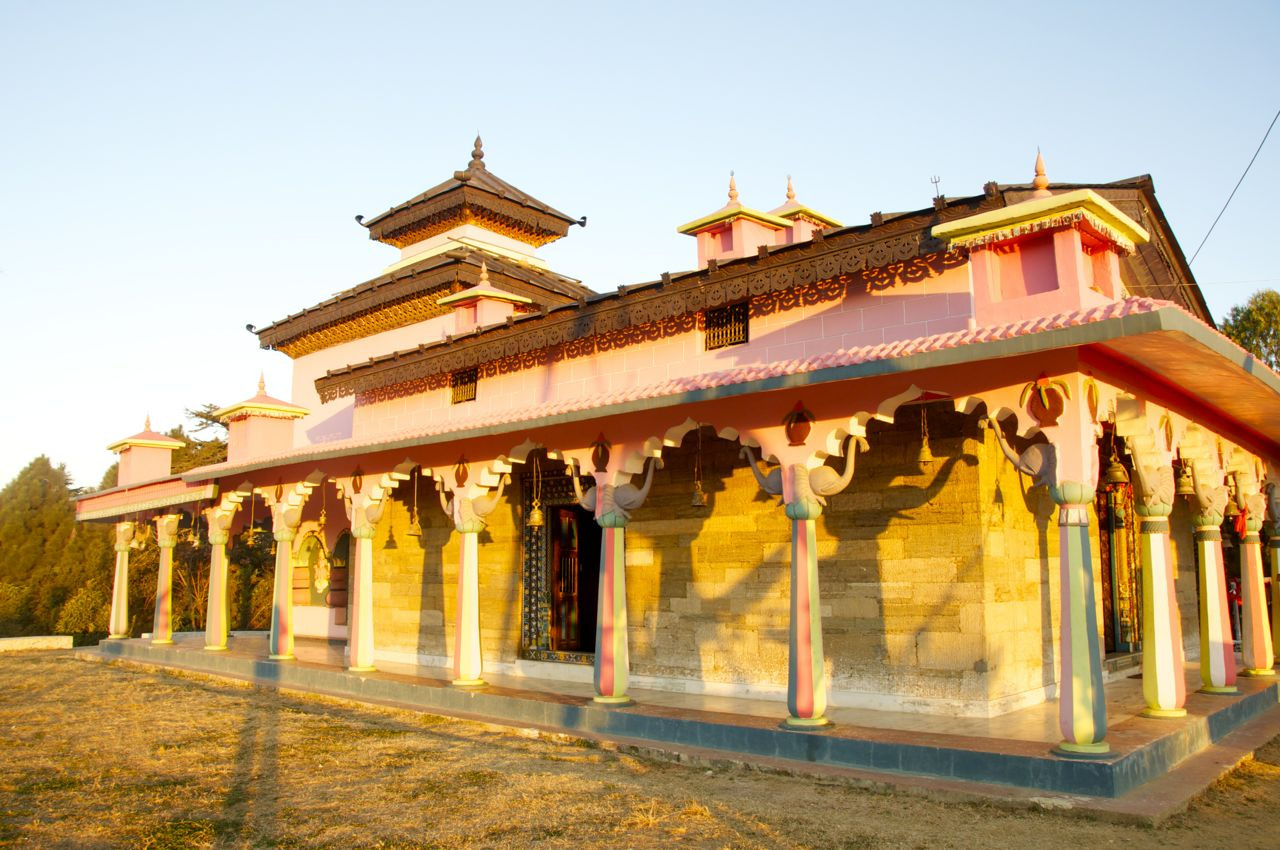
Ugratara Temple, Dadeldhura, Nepal

The region has a mountainous landscape that contains many religious temples. The district is seldom visited by tourists but contains local routes to Mt. Kailash in Tibet, Rara Lake in Mugu district (Typically this is not the route to Rara lake), and the last remaining remnants of the Far Western Malla Kingdom. Nagi Malla was the last royal to live here before the Nepalese unification.

The spoken language is Doteli (Dotyali) and the majority of inhabitants are Hindu. Dadeldhura is one of the most developed district among the other hilly districts in the far western region. Dadeldhura is the hometown of former prime minister of Nepal Hon. Sher Bahadur Deuba.

== Geography and climate ==
Climate Zone	Elevation range	% of Area
Lower Tropical	below 300 meters (1,000 ft)	0.6%
Upper Tropical	300 to 1,000 meters 1,000 to 3,300 ft.	34.7%
Subtropical	1,000 to 2,000 meters 3,300 to 6,600 ft.	55.8%
Temperate	2,000 to 3,000 meters 6,400 to 9,800 ft.	8.9%

The highest temperature ever recorded in Dadeldhura was 34.3 °C (93.7 °F) on June 20, 2012, while the lowest temperature ever recorded was −5.0 °C (23.0 °F) in January 2008.

Climate data for Dadeldhura, elevation 1,879 m (6,165 ft), (1991–2020, extremes 1978–present)
Month	Jan	Feb	Mar	Apr	May	Jun	Jul	Aug	Sep	Oct	Nov	Dec	Year
Record high °C (°F)	25.5 (77.9)	25.5 (77.9)	33.3 (91.9)	33.5 (92.3)	32.3 (90.1)	34.3 (93.7)	32.4 (90.3)	30.1 (86.2)	28.5 (83.3)	28.8 (83.8)	25.0 (77.0)	25.0 (77.0)	34.3 (93.7)
Mean daily maximum °C (°F)	14.6 (58.3)	16.2 (61.2)	20.4 (68.7)	24.2 (75.6)	26.3 (79.3)	26.4 (79.5)	24.6 (76.3)	24.4 (75.9)	24.3 (75.7)	22.7 (72.9)	19.5 (67.1)	16.6 (61.9)	21.7 (71.1)
Daily mean °C (°F)	9.2 (48.6)	10.7 (51.3)	14.5 (58.1)	18.2 (64.8)	20.5 (68.9)	21.6 (70.9)	21.1 (70.0)	20.9 (69.6)	20.0 (68.0)	17.2 (63.0)	13.7 (56.7)	10.9 (51.6)	16.5 (61.7)
Mean daily minimum °C (°F)	3.7 (38.7)	5.2 (41.4)	8.6 (47.5)	12.2 (54.0)	14.6 (58.3)	16.7 (62.1)	17.5 (63.5)	17.3 (63.1)	15.7 (60.3)	11.7 (53.1)	7.9 (46.2)	5.1 (41.2)	11.3 (52.3)
Record low °C (°F)	−5.0 (23.0)	−2.5 (27.5)	−1.0 (30.2)	3.0 (37.4)	6.8 (44.2)	7.8 (46.0)	8.0 (46.4)	10.8 (51.4)	10.6 (51.1)	1.4 (34.5)	3.0 (37.4)	−4.2 (24.4)	−5.0 (23.0)
Average precipitation mm (inches)	50.4 (1.98)	65.2 (2.57)	50.2 (1.98)	46.2 (1.82)	82.0 (3.23)	183.1 (7.21)	327.8 (12.91)	309.5 (12.19)	183.2 (7.21)	31.7 (1.25)	7.5 (0.30)	13.4 (0.53)	1,350.2 (53.16)
Average precipitation days (≥ 0.1 mm)	4.1	4.6	4.7	6.0	9.2	13.0	20.0	20.5	11.2	1.9	1.0	1.2	97.4
Source 1: Department Of Hydrology and Meteorology
Source 2: NOAA

== Demographics ==
Historical population
Census year	Pop.	±% p.a.
1981	86,853	—
1991	104,647	+1.88%
2001	126,162	+1.89%
2011	142,094	+1.20%
2021	139,420	−0.19%
Source: Citypopulation

At the time of the 2021 Nepal census, Dadeldhura District had a population of 139,602. 9.25% of the population is under 5 years of age. It has a literacy rate of 78.19% and a sex ratio of 1119 females per 1000 males. 59,739 (42.79%) lived in municipalities.

Castes/ethnic groups in Dadeldhura district (2021)
1. Chhetri (53.7%)
2. Bahun (14.2%)
3. Kami (12.3%)
4. Sarki (6.71%)
5. Magar (3.69%)
6. Damai (3.60%)
7. Thakuri (2.66%)
8. Dasnami (1.45%)
9. Others (1.68%)

Khas people make up a majority of the population with 95% of the population. Chhetris make up 54% of the population, while Khas Dalits make up 23% of the population. Hill Janjatis, mainly Magars, are 4% of the population.

Languages of Dadeldhura district (2021)
1. Nepali (40.0%)
2. Doteli (37.8%)
3. Dadeldhuri (9.41%)
4. Baitadeli (4.29%)
5. Bajhangi (3.62%)
6. Magar Dhut (1.66%)
7. Magar Kham (1.21%)
8. Others (2.06%)

At the time of the 2021 census, 40.00% of the population spoke Nepali, 37.75% Doteli, 9.41% Dadeldhuri, 1.66% Magar Dhut and 1.21% Magar Kham as their first language. In 2011, 5.4% of the population spoke Nepali as their first language.

Religion in Dadeldhura District (2021)
Religion	Percent
Hinduism	98.18%
Buddhism	1.35%
Other or not stated	0.47%

== Administration ==
The district consists of seven municipalities, out of which two are urban municipalities and five are rural municipalities. These are as follows:

- Amargadhi municipality
- Parshuram municipality
- Aalitaal Rural Municipality
- Bhageshwar Rural Municipality
- Navadurga Rural Municipality
- Ajaymeru Rural Municipality
- Ganyapadhura Rural Municipality

=== Former village development committees ===
Prior to the restructuring of the district, Dadeldhura District consisted of the following Village development committees:

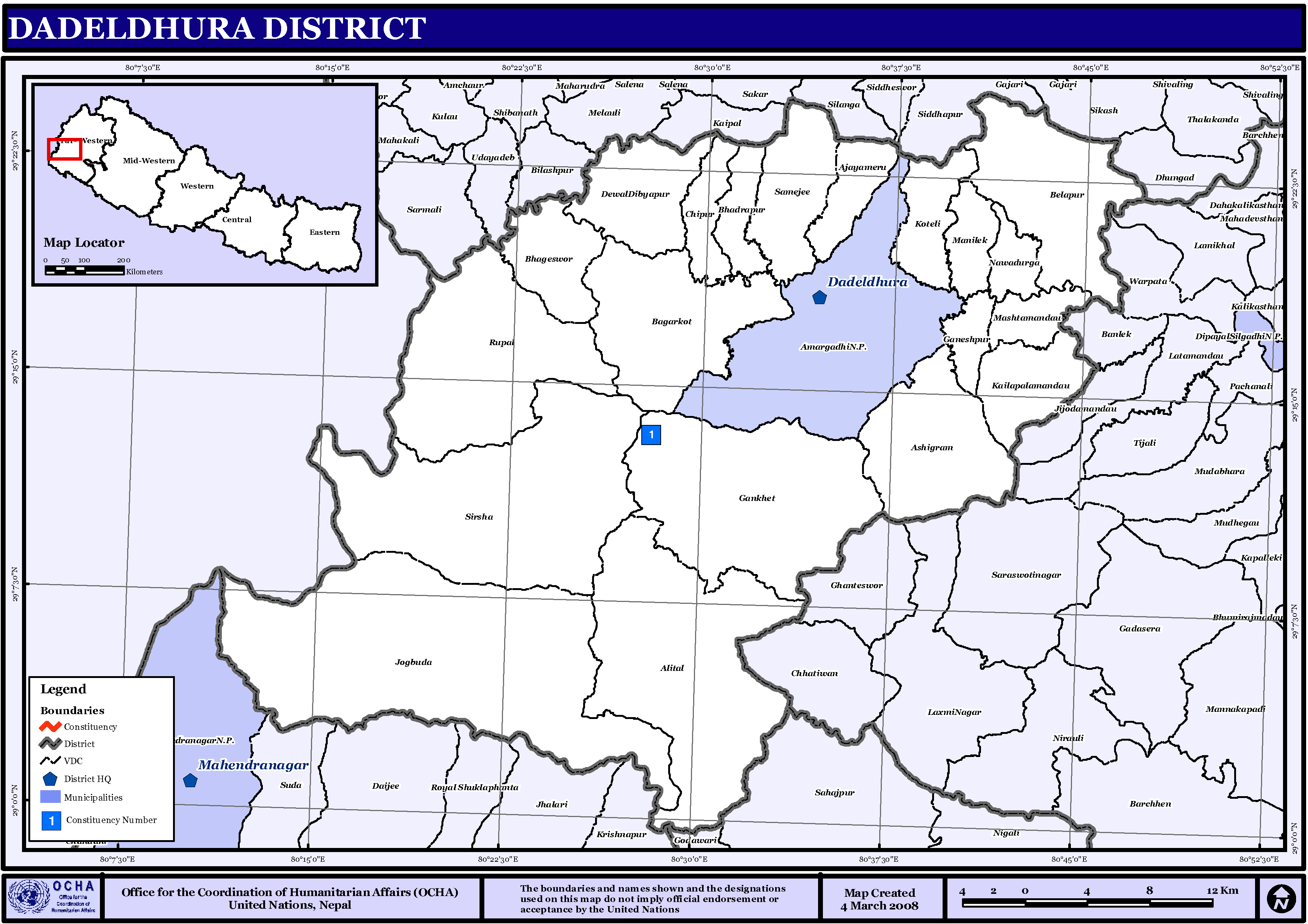
Map of the VDCs in Dadeldhura District

- Ajayameru
- Alital
- Amargadhi
- Ashigram
- Bagarkot
- Belapur
- Bhadrapur
- Bhageshwar
- Bhumiraj
- Chipur
- Dewal Dibyapur
- Ghatal
- Ganeshpur
- Gankhet
- Jogbuda
- Kailapalmandau
- Khalanga
- Koteli
- Manilek
- Mashtamandau
- Nawadurga
- Rupal
- Sahastralinga
- Samaiji
- Sirsha

== See also ==
- Pasela
