= Dewal Dibyapur =

Village development committee in Mahakali Zone, Nepal

Dewal Dibyapur देवल दिव्यपुर
- Village development committee
- Location in Nepal
- Coordinates: 29.36°N 80.45°E
- Country: Nepal
- Zone: Mahakali Zone
- District: Dadeldhura District

Population (2001)
  - Total: 5,676
- Time zone: UTC+5:45 (Nepal Time)

Dewal Dibyapur is a village development committee in Dadeldhura District in the Mahakali Zone of western Nepal. At the time of the 1991 Nepal census it had a population of 5258 people living in 939 individual households.
