= Chipur =

Village development committee in Dadeldhura, Nepal

Chipur चिपुर Nahal Niwas
- Village development committee
- Nickname: नहल निवास
- Location in Nepal
- Coordinates: 29.35°N 80.50°E
- Country: Nepal
- Zone: Mahakali Zone
- District: Dadeldhura District

Population (1991)
  - Total: 2,589
- Time zone: UTC+5:45 (Nepal Time)

Chipur is a village development committee in Dadeldhura District in the Mahakali Zone of western Nepal. At the time of the 1991 Nepal census, it had a population of 2589 people living in 483 individual households.
