= Sirsha, Nepal =

Sirsha शीर्ष
- Village development committee
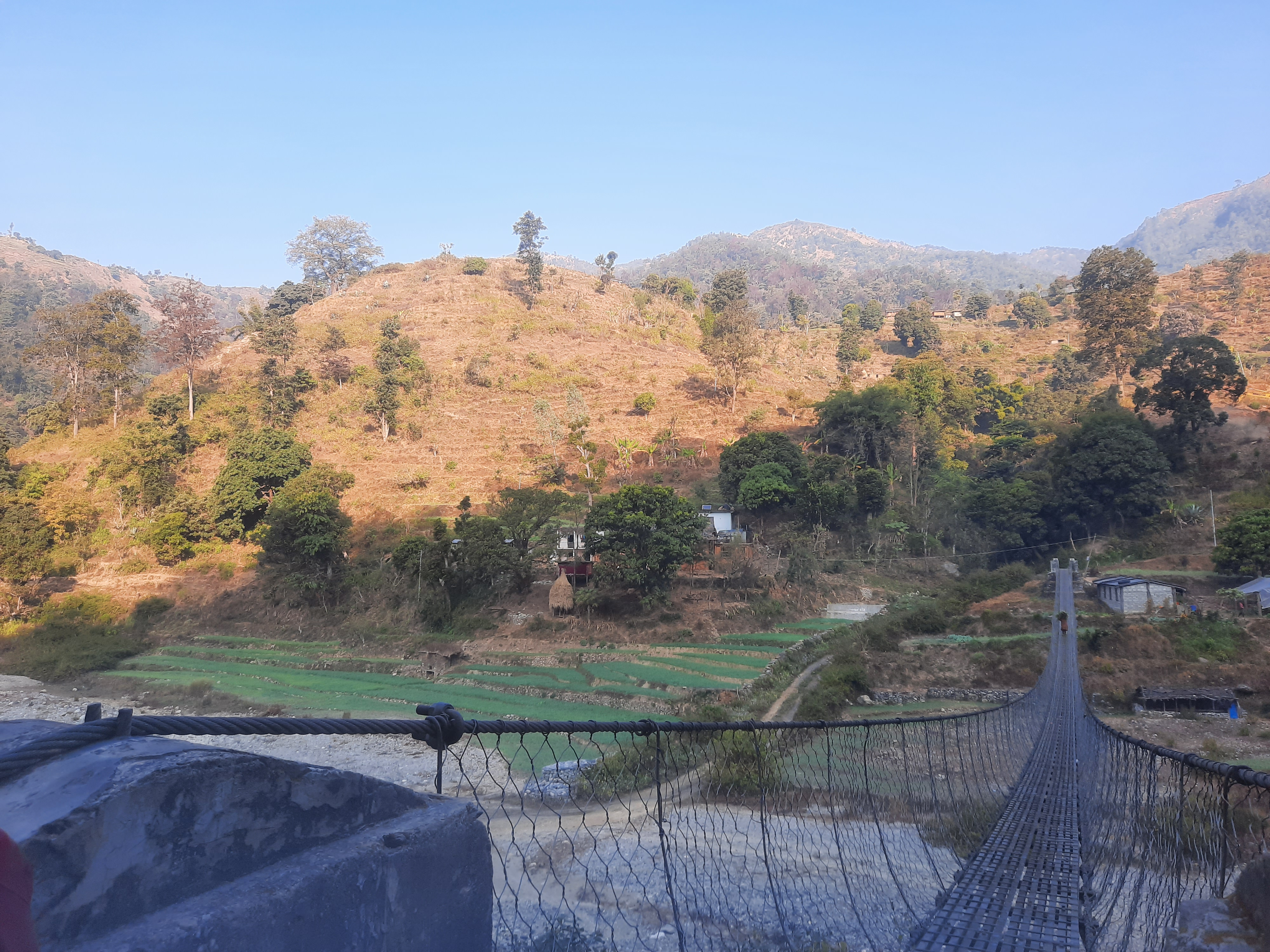
- Sirsha Village Image from Mukesh Pandey Gallery.

- Location in Nepal
- Coordinates: 29.17°N 80.36°E
- Country: Nepal
- Zone: Mahakali Zone
- District: Dadeldhura District

Population (1991)
  - Total: 7,878
- Time zone: UTC+5:45 (Nepal Time)

Sirsha is a village development committee in Dadeldhura District in the Mahakali Zone of Sudurpaschim Province, Nepal. The 1991 Nepal census noted a population of 7878 People Living in 1269 individual households.
