= Pohuwato Regency =

Regency in Gorontalo, Indonesia

Coordinates: 0°31′59″N 121°49′30″E

Pohuwato Regency Kabupaten Pohuwato
- Regency
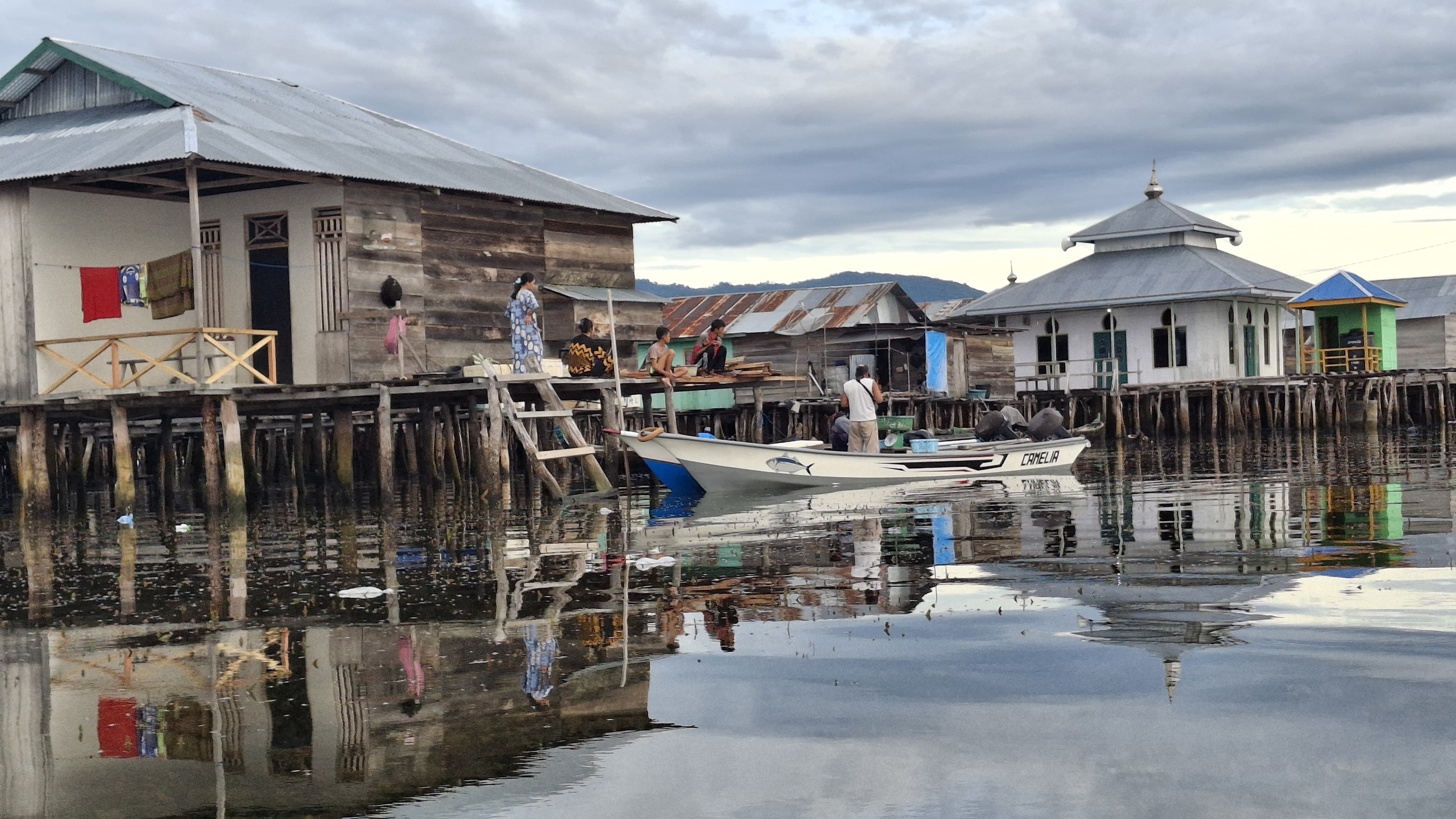
- Life of the Bajo People in Torosiaje Village, Pohuwato Regency

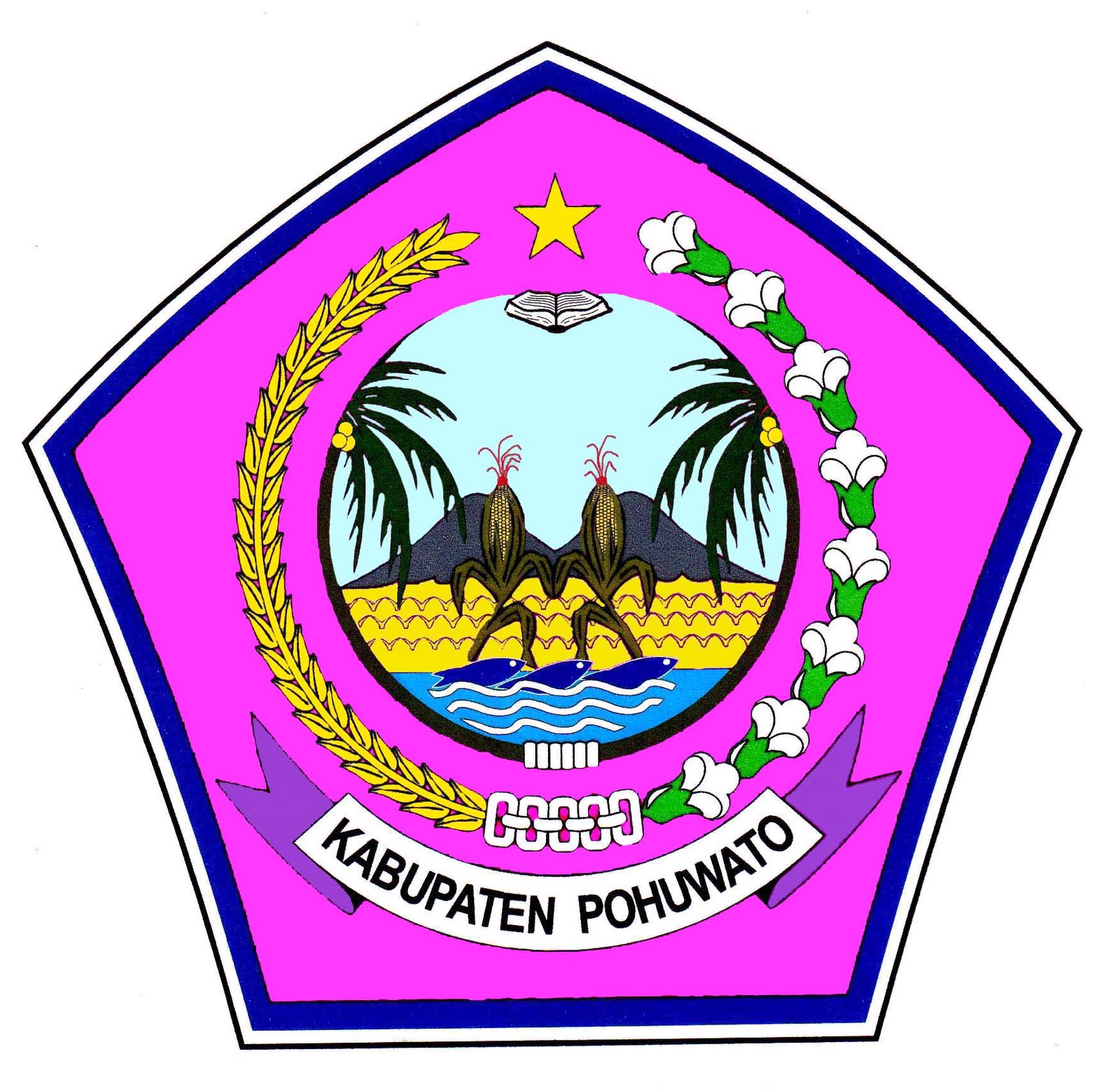
- Seal

- Coordinates: 0° 31 59 N, 121° 49 30 E
- Country: Indonesia
- Province: Gorontalo
- Capital: Marisa

Government
  - Regent: Saipul A. Mbuinga
  - Vice Regent: Suharsi Igirisa

Area
  - Total: 4,369.08 km^{2} (1,686.91 sq mi)

Population (end 2025 estimate)
  - Total: 165,752
  - Density: 37.9375/km^{2} (98.2577/sq mi)
- Time zone: UTC+8:00
  - Summer (DST): UTC+8:00

Pohuwato is a regency of Gorontalo Province, Indonesia. It is located on the northern (or Minahasa) peninsula of the island of Sulawesi. It was established on 25 February 2003 under Law Number (Undang-Undang Nomor) 6/2003 by splitting off from the western part of Boalemo Regency. It has a land area of 4,369.08 km^{2}, and had a population of 128,748 at the 2010 Census and 146,432 at the 2020 Census; the official estimate as at end 2025 was 165,752 (comprising 84,492 males and 81,260 females). The seat of the regency administration is in the town of Marisa. The western half of the area (50.08%) has a much lower population, with only 29% of the regency's inhabitants in 2025.

== History ==
On 21 September 2023, Pohuwato regent office and Regional People's Representative Council building were burned by local miners. They demanded PT Pani Gold Project (PGP) or PT Puncak Emas Tani Sejahtera (PETS, a subsidiary of Merdeka Copper Gold) to return the ancestral land they worked on. Previously, the protesters have raided the company's office on the same day. The offices were later demolished on 4 December 2023.

== Administrative districts ==
Pohuwato Regency is divided into thirteen districts (kecamatan), tabulated below with their areas and their populations at the 2010 Census and the 2020 Census, together with the official estimates as at end 2025. The table also includes the locations of the district administrative centres, the number of administrative villages in each district (totaling 101 rural desa and 3 urban kelurahan - the latter all in Paguat District), and its postal codes.

Kode Wilayah	Name of District (kecamatan)	Area in km^{2}	Pop'n Census 2010	Pop'n Census 2020	Pop'n Estimate end 2025	Admin centre	No. of villages	Post codes
75.04.01	Popayato ^{(a)}	61.09	9,169	10,313	11,719	Popayato	10	96466
75.04.13	Popayato Barat (West Popayato)	715.72	6,670	7,327	8,567	Dudewulo	7	96467
75.04.12	Popayato Timur (East Popayato)	403.03	7,712	8,372	9,389	Maleo	7	96467
75.04.02	Lemito ^{(b)}	459.60	10,488	11,306	12,346	Lemito	8	96468
75.04.11	Wanggarasi	548.57	4,573	5,304	6,057	Limbula	7	96465 & 96469
	western half	2,188.01	38,612	42,622	48,078		39	
75.04.04	Marisa ^{(c)}	28.73	17,680	21,260	24,640	Botubilatahu Indah	8	96365
75.04.06	Patilanggio	232.37	8,686	9,763	10,906	Suka Makmur	6	96366
75.04.09	Buntulia	434.44	10,494	11,792	13,888	Buntulia Utara	7	96363
75.04.10	Duhiadaa	37.05	10,662	12,793	14,665	Buntulia Barat	8	96364
75.04.03	Randangan	187.50	14,995	16,959	19,746	Motolohu	13	96469
75.04.07	Taluditi	831.05	7,248	8,813	9,407	Panca Karsa II	7	96464
75.04.05	Paguat ^{(d)}	68.60	14,967	16,165	17,607	Bohu Jaya	11 ^{(e)}	96362
75.04.08	Dengilo	361.33	5,404	6,265	6,815	Popaya	5	96361
	eastern half	2,181.07	90,135	103,810	117,674		65	
	Totals	4,369.08	128,748	146,432	165,752	Marisa	104	

Notes: (a) including 17 offshore islands. (b) including 25 offshore islands. (c) including 3 offshore islands. (d) including 3 offshore islands. (e) comprising 3 kelurahan (Libuo, Pentadu and Siduan) and 8 desa.
