= Jogbuda =

Jogbuda जोगबुडा
- Village development committee
- Location in Nepal
- Coordinates: 29.09°N 80.32°E
- Country: Nepal
- Zone: Mahakali Zone
- District: Dadeldhura District

Population (1991)
  - Total: 13,521
- Time zone: UTC+5:45 (Nepal Time)

Jogbuda is a village development committee in Dadeldhura District in the Mahakali Zone of western Nepal. At the time of the 1991 Nepal census it had a population of 13,521 people living in 2191 individual households.
