= Merpati Nusantara Airlines Flight 516 =

1977 aviation incident in Indonesia

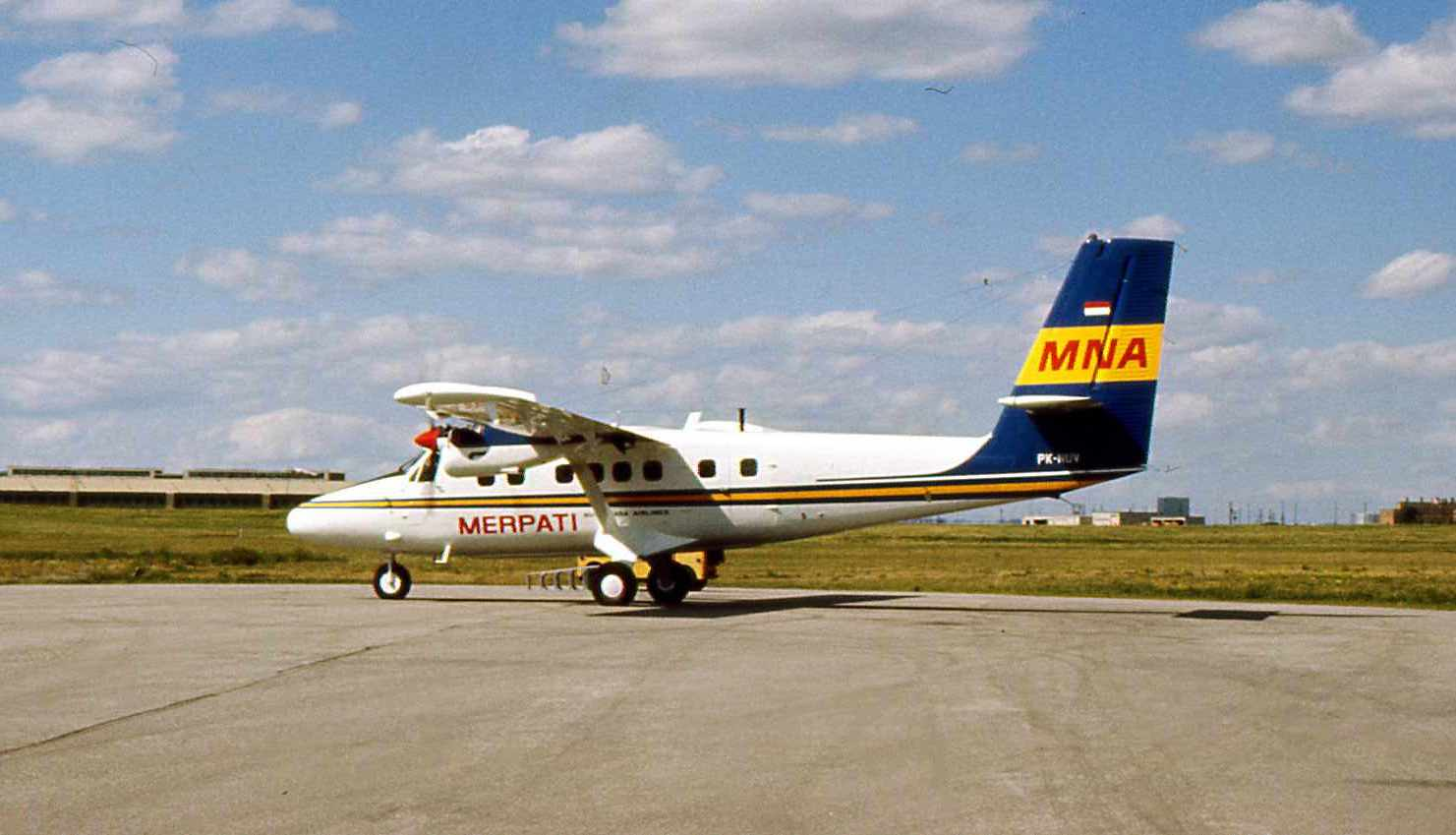
- A Merpati Nusantara Airlines DHC-6, similar aircraft to the one involved the crash

Accident
- Date: 29 March 1977
- Summary: Controlled flight into terrain caused by pilot error
- Site: Donggala Regency, Central Sulawesi, Indonesia

Aircraft
- Aircraft type: de Havilland Canada DHC-6 Twin Otter 300
- Operator: Merpati Nusantara Airlines
- IATA flight No.: MZ516
- ICAO flight No.: MNA516
- Call sign: MERPATI 516
- Registration: PK-NUP
- Flight origin: Mutiara Airport, Palu
- Destination: Lalos Airport, Tolitoli Regency
- Occupants: 23
- Passengers: 20
- Crew: 3
- Fatalities: 13
- Survivors: 10

Merpati Nusantara Airlines Flight 516 was a domestic commercial passenger 50-minutes flight, flying from Mutiara Airport, Palu to Lalos Airport in Tolitoli Regency, Indonesia operated by a de Havilland Canada DHC-6 Twin Otter 300.

The aircraft crashed into Mount Tinombala in Central Sulawesi, Indonesia. Killing 13 people on board.

== Aircraft and crew ==
The aircraft involved, manufactured in 1976, was a de Havilland Canada DHC-6 Twin Otter registered as PK-NUP. It was powered by two Pratt & Whitney Canada PT6A-27 engines.

On board the flight were 23 occupants consisting of 20 passengers and 3 crew members, including 2–3 children. The three-member crew consisted of captain Ahmad Anwar, first officer Mochammad Masykoer and flight engineer Abhy Irawan.

== Accident ==
On 29 March 1977, the aircraft was operating a regularly scheduled passenger flight from Mutiara Airport, Palu, to Tolitoli Airport, Tolitoli Regency. The flight to Tolitoli was scheduled to take one hour, and was slated to arrive at 10:56 local time at Lalos. The flight had initially departed from Sam Ratulangi International Airport to Luwuk, then to Poso before arriving at Mutiara Airport at 10:26 local time.

== Search and rescue operation ==
By 12:56, the aircraft had still not arrived at Lalos Airport, and searches performed at nearby airports did not give any information. At 6pm, the aircraft was presumed to have crashed and was declared missing. Searches were initially concentrated in Palu and Tolitoli and the areas surrounding them. Participating in the search and rescue (SAR) operation were: 40 Para Rescue personnel from the Air Force Operation Command and the Airborne brigades; 18 pilots, 17 aircraft technicians, and 14 volunteer troops from the Indonesian Army, Indonesian National Police, and Hansip, along with thousands of volunteers. In addition, nine aircraft were involved in the SAR operation, including one DHC-6 from the airline; one Fokker F-27 and one C-130 Hercules from the Indonesian Air Force; one Short SC.7 Skyvan, two MBB Bo 105, one Hughes 500, and one SA 330 Puma from Pelita Air; and one Alouette III from Indonesia Air Transport.

== Aftermath ==
The accident was made in to a book named as The Tinombala Incident. Following the accident, M. Aminudin A. wrote a story script on the crash which was subsequently adapted into a 116-minute film titled Operation Tinombala. (Note: Indonesian: Operasi Tinombala) It was directed by M. Sharieffudin and starred W. D. Mochtar and Tutie Kirana. A photo exhibition about the crash was held on march 29, 2022.
