= Mutiara SIS Al-Jufrie Airport =

Airport serving Palu, Central Sulawesi, Indonesia

Mutiara SIS Al-Jufrie Airport Bandar Udara Mutiara SIS Al-Jufrie
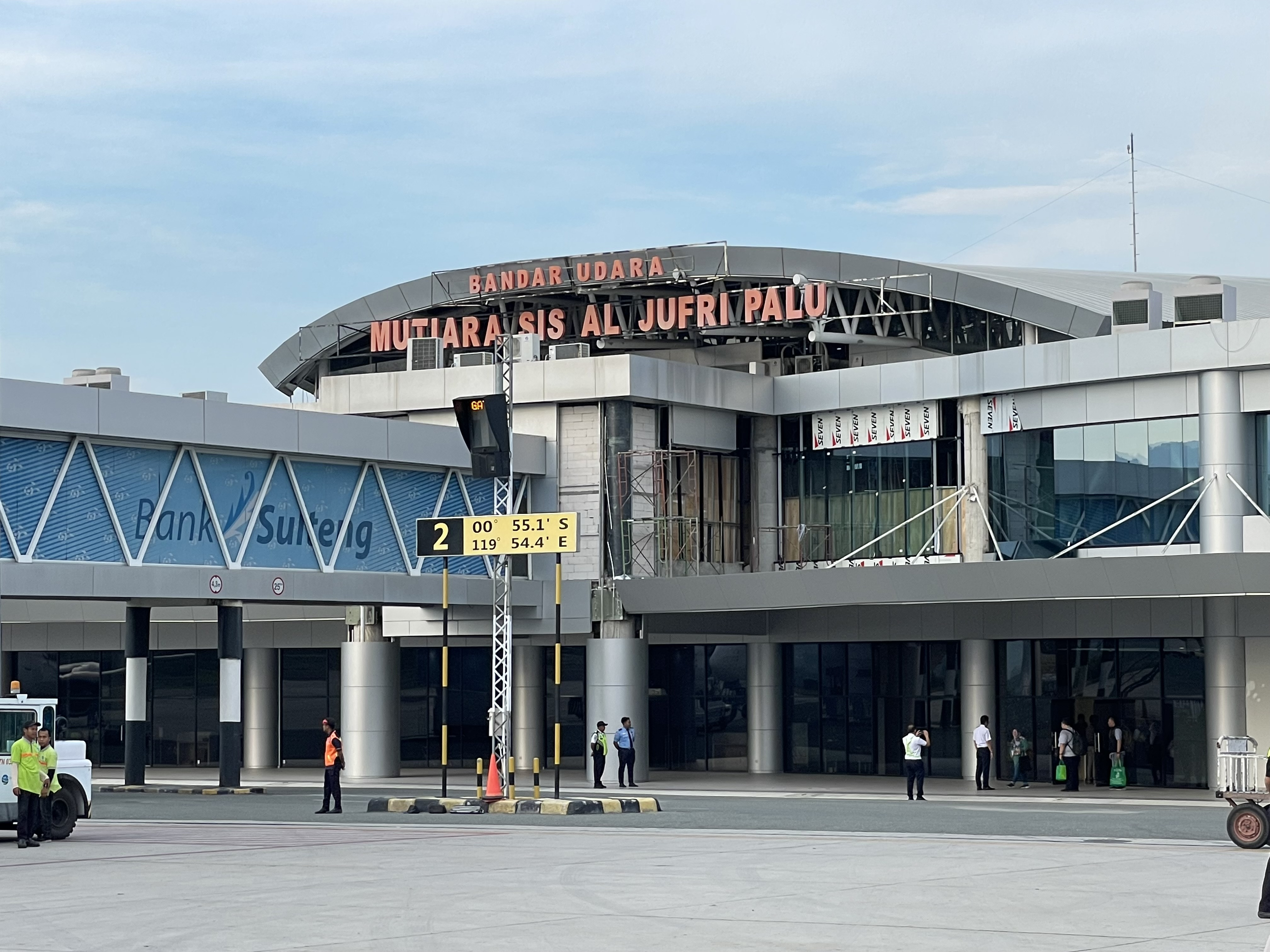
- IATA: PLW; ICAO: WAFF; WMO: 97072

Summary
- Airport type: Public
- Owner: Government of Indonesia
- Operator: Directorate General of Civil Aviation
- Serves: Palu
- Location: Palu, Central Sulawesi, Indonesia
- Time zone: WITA (UTC+08:00)
- Elevation AMSL: 77.4 m (254 ft)
- Coordinates: 00°55′07″S 119°54′35″E
- Website: www.bandaramutiarasaj.com

Maps
- Sulawesi region in Indonesia

- Location of airport in Central Sulawesi / Indonesia PLW/WAFF (Indonesia)

Runways
Direction	Length		Surface
Direction	m	ft	Surface
15/33	2,510	8,235	Asphalt

Statistics (2024)
- Passengers: 825,126 (▲6.1%)
- Cargo (tonnes): 12,644 (▲14.7%)
- Aircraft movements: 7,721 (▼0.2%)
- Source: DGCA

Mutiara SIS Al-Jufrie Airport (IATA: PLW, ICAO: WAFF), formerly known as Masovu Airport, is an international airport near Palu, the capital city of the province of Central Sulawesi on the island of Sulawesi in Indonesia. As the largest and busiest airport in Central Sulawesi, Mutiara SIS Al-Jufrie Airport serves as the primary gateway to Palu and its surrounding areas. The airport offers connections to major cities across Indonesia, including Jakarta, Surabaya, and Makassar, as well as regional flights to other cities and towns in Sulawesi. In 2025, the airport was officially designated as an international airport by the Ministry of Transportation. It began serving charter flights to Guangzhou, China, in 2026.

The airport's name consists of two parts: Mutiara and SIS Al-Jufrie. Mutiara means "pearl" in Indonesian, while SIS Al-Jufrie is an abbreviation of Sayyid Idrus bin Salim Al-Jufri, an Arab-Indonesian religious leader from Central Sulawesi. He was a prominent Islamic missionary in the region until his death in Palu in 1969. SIS Al-Jufri also founded Alkhairaat, a religious organization that grew and flourished across eastern Indonesia.

== History ==
=== Construction and early history ===
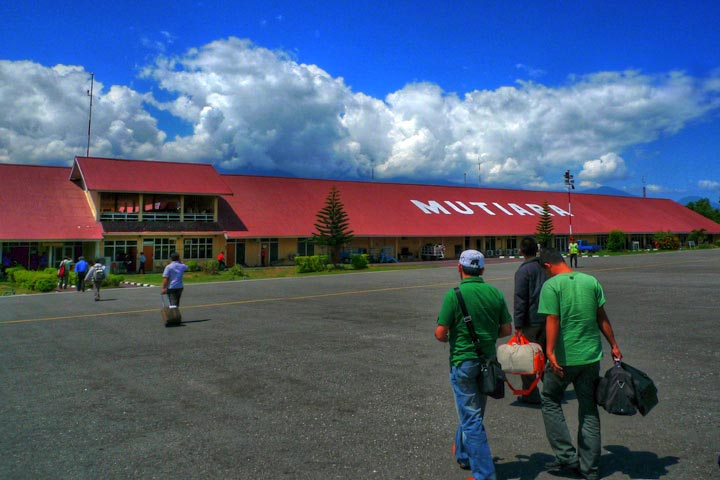
Former terminal of Mutiara Airport, demolished in 2014

The airport was built in 1954 by the Central Sulawesi regional government. At the time, the area was still under the jurisdiction of Donggala Regency. It was named Masowu or Masovu, which in the local Kaili language means "dusty." The name reflected the airfield's surroundings, where dust would be stirred up whenever an aircraft landed. The airport was renamed to Mutiara Airport in 1957, meaning "pearl" in Indonesian, during a visit by Indonesia's first president, Sukarno. The name was inspired by Sukarno's observation that the area glistened like a pearl as he landed in Palu.

During the Permesta rebellion in the late 1950s, the airport was captured by Permesta rebels along with the city of Palu. It was recaptured by government forces on 1 April 1958 following a joint operation by the Indonesian Air Force and the Mobile Brigade Corps.

The airport changed hands several times. It was initially managed by the Donggala Regency Government before being transferred to the Indonesian Air Force in 1958 during the height of the Permesta rebellion. Administration was returned to the Donggala Regency Government in 1963, before the airport was officially transferred to the Directorate General of Civil Aviation of the Ministry of Transportation on 28 October 1964. The airport began serving commercial flights to Jakarta via Makassar on 13 October 1964, operated by Garuda Indonesia, making it one of the last two major cities in Sulawesi, along with Kendari, to be connected to the capital.

By the 1970s, the airport's facilities remained very modest. Its runway measured only 1,100 m × 30 m, limiting the types of aircraft it could accommodate to smaller Fokker aircraft. Despite these limitations, the airport was considered crucial, as it was the only airport in Central Sulawesi handling scheduled passenger flights at the time. It had already been designated as a transit hub, with flights to Manado and Balikpapan, while also serving Ambon and Ternate in the Maluku Islands via Manado. These services were operated by Bouraq Indonesian Airlines. The airport also served as a hub for pioneer flights to remote areas of Central Sulawesi, including Toli-Toli and Luwuk, operated by Merpati Nusantara Airlines using DHC-6 Twin Otter aircraft.

=== Contemporary history ===
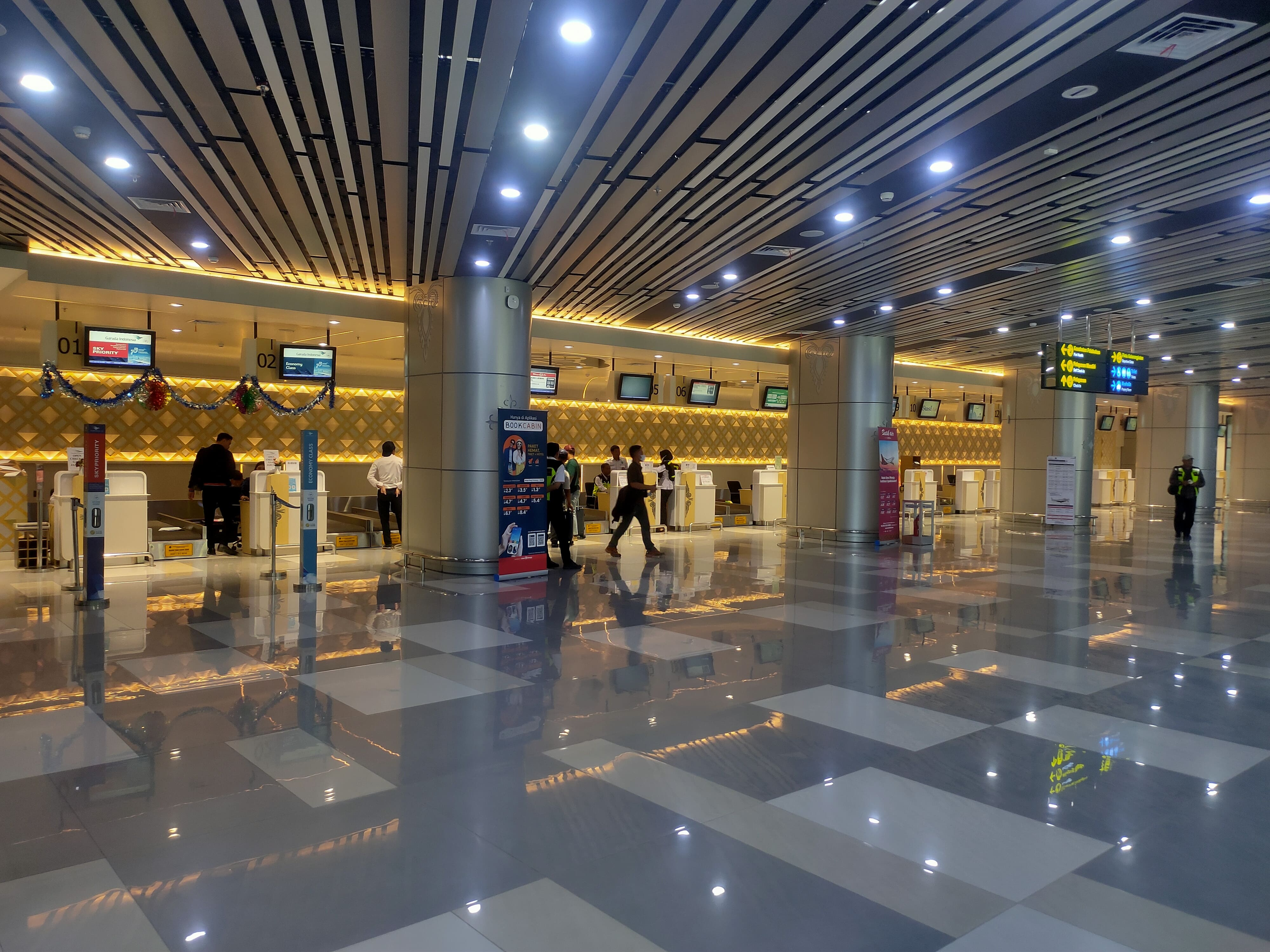
Check-in hall

In 2010, construction began on a new terminal to replace the old terminal, which had become overcrowded due to increasing passenger numbers. The new terminal, built with a government investment of 139.2 billion rupiah, was officially inaugurated on 13 April 2014, coinciding with the 50th anniversary of Central Sulawesi. On the same occasion, the airport was renamed to Mutiara SIS Al-Jufrie Airport, in honor of Idrus bin Salim Al-Jufri, a prominent religious leader from Central Sulawesi. He was the founder of Alkhairaat, the largest Islamic community organization in eastern Indonesia based in Palu.

On 28 September 2018, Mutiara SIS Al-Jufrie Airport sustained severe damage during the Sulawesi earthquake and was forced to close after large cracks, including one measuring 500 meters long, formed on the runway. Additionally, the airport's control tower collapsed, and its navigation systems suffered extensive damage. Anthonius Gunawan Agung, an air traffic control officer, was directing a Batik Air flight, the last departure of the day, when the earthquake struck. He was fatally injured after falling from the collapsing tower and died hours later. Major structural damage was also reported in the airport, with the roof the airport's terminal reportedly caved in. The airport was reopened for limited operation on 29 September 2018. Due to the damage in the airport, hundreds of passengers were stranded and were told to wait in the airport's apron. Normal operation returned on service on 30 September.

Following the earthquake, the airport terminal was rebuilt and renovated. The reconstruction and renovation works were completed in 2024, with the newly restored airport officially inaugurated by then-President Joko Widodo. The total cost of the reconstruction was approximately 599 billion rupiah.

The airport's status became international on 11 August 2025 and it plans to operate international flights to 28 countries in 2026. The airport's first international flight was inaugurated on 6 August 2026, with a charter service from Palu to Guangzhou, China, operated by Garuda Indonesia. Plans are underway to designate the airport as a Hajj embarkation point, with flights to Jeddah, Saudi Arabia, planned to serve Hajj pilgrims.

== Facilities and development ==
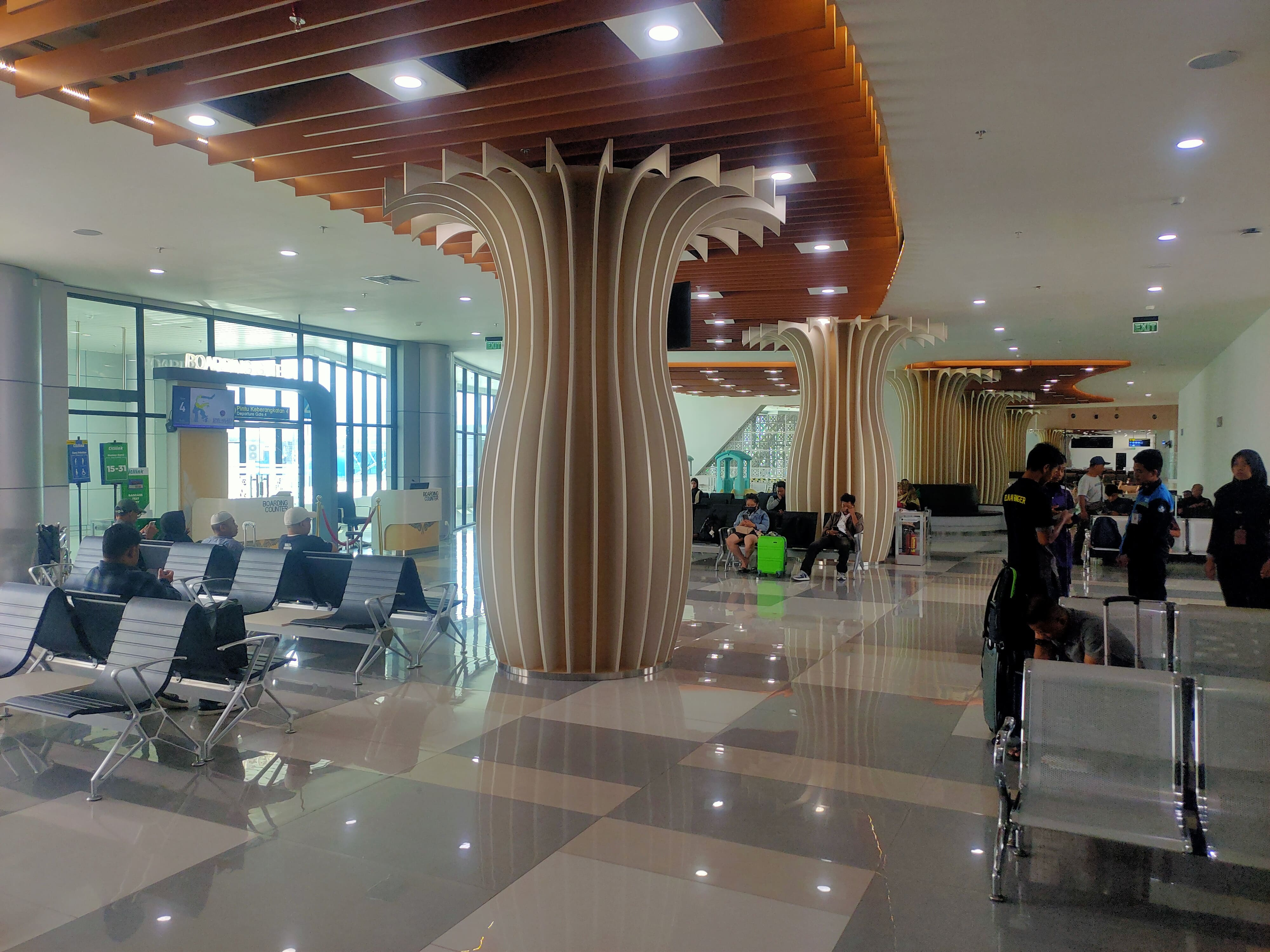
Boarding gate

The passenger terminal covers an area of 19,000 m² and has a capacity of up to 3 million passengers annually. It is also equipped with three jet bridges. The airport features a modern architectural design and consists of two floors. The check-in hall and baggage claim area are located on the first floor, while the boarding gates and commercial areas are located on the second floor. The airport is equipped with 10 check-in counters and three baggage conveyor belts. With the airport's designation as an international airport, additional facilities were added to support international services, particularly Customs, Immigration, and Quarantine (CIQ).

On the airside, Mutiara SIS Al-Jufri Airport has a runway that is 2,510 meters long and 45 meters wide, allowing all types of narrow-body aircraft such as Boeing 737 and Airbus A320 to land. The runway extension was completed in 2024, increasing its length from 2,250 metres. The airport’s apron can currently accommodate up to nine narrow-body aircraft. The concrete apron is planned to be widened from 373 metres to 458 metres, adding two additional aircraft parking stands. However, the current apron length of 110 metres is insufficient to accommodate aircraft larger than the Boeing 737-900ER, such as the Airbus A321neo. The runway will also be optimized and extended to 3,000 m to accommodate wide-body aircraft such as the Airbus A330, requiring the acquisition of 36,000 square meters of land.

The airport is planned to become a "smart airport" through the integration of advanced technologies, including U-APOC and digital platforms, to improve operational efficiency and passenger services. One of the main initiatives is Total Airport Management, which integrates airport operations into a centralized system to enable real-time and collaborative decision-making.

== Airlines and destinations ==
=== Passenger ===
Airlines	Destinations
Batik Air	Jakarta–Soekarno-Hatta, Makassar
China Southern Airlines	Charter: Guangzhou
Garuda Indonesia	Jakarta–Soekarno-Hatta, Makassar; Charter: Guangzhou
Lion Air	Makassar, Surabaya
Sriwijaya Air	Makassar
Super Air Jet	Jakarta–Soekarno-Hatta
Susi Air	Ampana, Poso
Wings Air	Balikpapan, Buol, Luwuk, Morowali, Toli-Toli

== Traffic ==
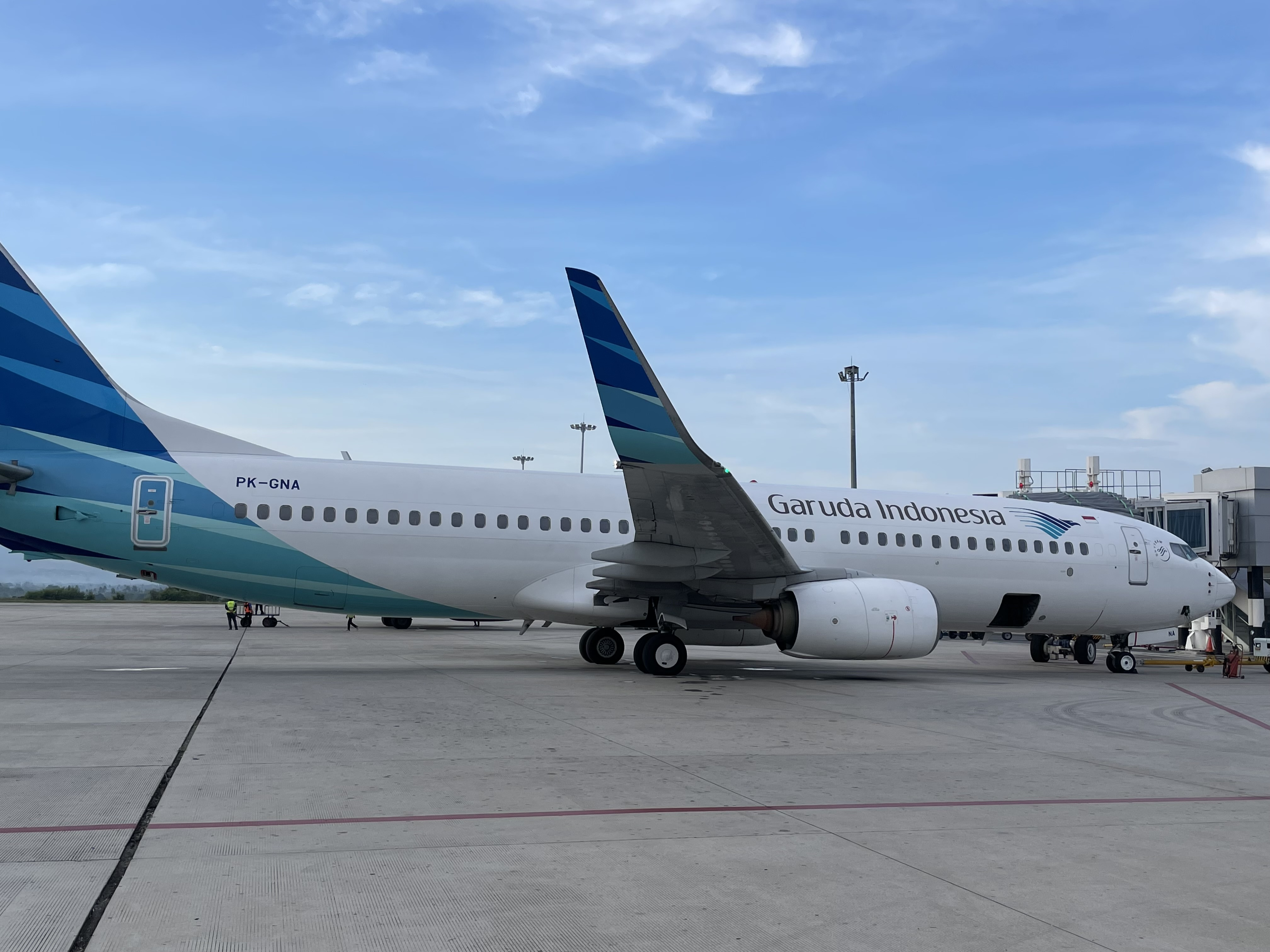
A Garuda Indonesia Boeing 737-800 at Mutiara SIS Al-Jufrie International Airport

Annual passenger numbers and aircraft statistics
Year	Passengers handled	Passenger % change	Cargo (tonnes)	Cargo % change	Aircraft movements	Aircraft % change
2006	380,885	Steady	3,632	Steady	4,449	Steady
2007	432,260	▲13.5	4,226	▲16.4	5,180	▲16.4
2008	406,882	▼5.9	3,474	▼17.8	4,489	▼13.3
2009	548,837	▲34.9	4,537	▲30.6	5,414	▲20.6
2010	697,614	▲27.1	6,439	▲41.9	6,430	▲18.8
2011	810,965	▲16.2	8,359	▲29.8	7,234	▲12.5
2012	846,643	▲4.4	5,749	▼31.2	6,950	▼3.9
2013	1,012,387	▲19.6	4,117	▼28.4	8,640	▲24.3
2014	1,013,279	▲0.1	3,958	▼3.9	7,876	▼8.8
2015	749,553	▼26.0	3,433	▼13.3	6,368	▼19.1
2016	1,107,102	▲47.7	3,553	▲3.5	11,872	▲86.4
2017	1,052,209	▼5.0	6,332	▲78.2	11,848	▼0.2
2018	2,009,677	▲91.0	7,189	▲13.5	13,347	▲12.7
2019	1,793,292	▼10.8	7,045	▼2.0	12,699	▼4.9
2020	452,056	▼74.8	6,561	▼6.9	5,007	▼60.6
2021	435,812	▼3.6	9,940	▲51.5	5,518	▲10.2
2022	655,764	▲50.5	12,056	▲21.3	7,291	▲32.1
2023	777,572	▲18.8	11,023	▼8.6	7,736	▲6.1
2024	825,126	▲6.1	12,644	▲14.7	7,721	▼0.2
^{Source: DGCA, BPS}

== Accidents and incidents ==
- On 29 March 1977, Merpati Nusantara Airlines Flight 516, operated by a DHC-6 Twin Otter, crashed into the foothills of Mount Tinombala approximately five minutes after departing Mutiara Airport on a flight from Palu to Tolitoli. The aircraft was carrying 20 passengers and three crew members. The survivors were forced to endure five days in the jungle before being discovered on 5 April by a joint search-and-rescue operation conducted by the Indonesian Air Force and Basarnas. A total of 13 occupants were killed in the accident.
- On 14 January 2017, Wings Air Flight 1156, operated by an ATR 72-500, caught fire in its right engine approximately 10 minutes after departing Mutiara SIS Al-Jufrie Airport on a flight from Palu to Luwuk. The aircraft subsequently returned safely to the airport. No casualties were reported, although several passengers were reportedly shocked by the incident.
