= BJG =

BJG may refer to:

- the ISO 639-3 code for Bijago language
- the IATA code for Bolaang Airport, Indonesia
- Briahna Joy Gray, an American lawyer and political pundit
