= Syukuran Aminuddin Amir Airport =

Airport in Luwuk, Sulawesi, Indonesia

Syukuran Aminuddin Amir Airport Bandar Udara Syukuran Aminuddin Amir
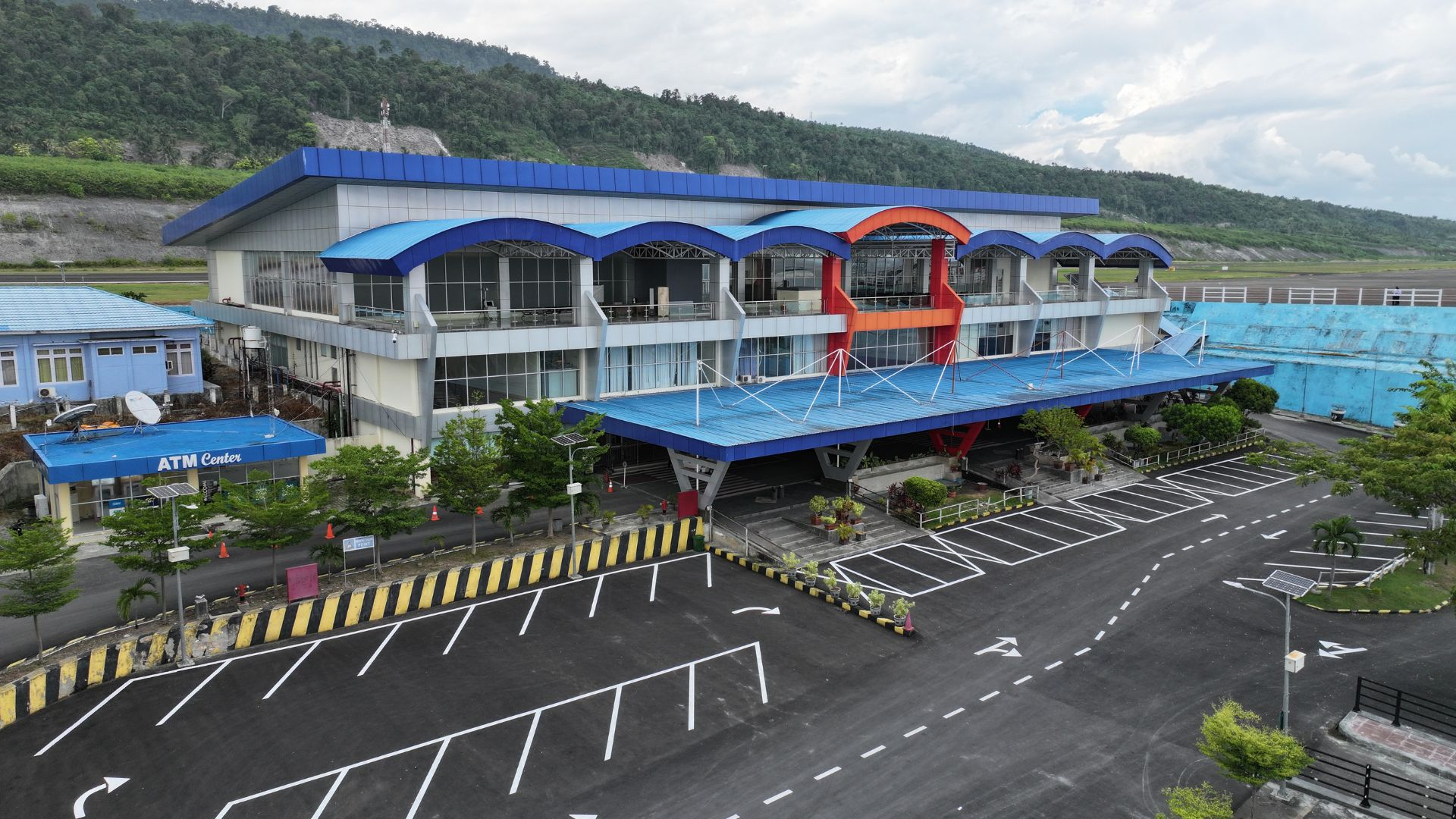
- IATA: LUW; ICAO: WAFW

Summary
- Airport type: Public
- Owner: Government of Indonesia
- Operator: Directorate General of Civil Aviation
- Serves: Luwuk
- Location: South Luwuk District, Banggai Regency, Central Sulawesi, Indonesia
- Time zone: WITA (UTC+08:00)
- Elevation AMSL: 17.07 m (56.0 ft)
- Coordinates: 01°02′20″S 122°46′19″E

Map
- Airport in the Sulawesi region

Runways
Direction	Length		Surface
Direction	m	ft	Surface
04/22	2,250	7,382	Asphalt

Statistics (2024)
- Passengers: 177,342 (▲2.43%)
- Cargo (tonnes): 687.71 (▼20.26%)
- Aircraft movements: 1,576 (▼13.50%)
- Source: DGCA

Syukuran Aminuddin Amir Airport (IATA: LUW, ICAO: WAFW), formerly Bubung Airport, is a domestic airport serving Luwuk, the administrative seat of Banggai Regency, in the eastern part of Central Sulawesi, Indonesia. The airport is named after Syukuran Aminuddin Amir, the last king of the Kingdom of Banggai, who played a role in the integration of the kingdom into the Republic of Indonesia. Located approximately 10 km (6.2 mi) from Luwuk's town center, the airport serves as a major gateway to Luwuk, Banggai Regency, and the eastern peninsula of Sulawesi. It primarily handles domestic flights within Sulawesi, with regular services to major cities such as Makassar, Manado, and Palu. The airport also serves pioneer routes connecting Luwuk with smaller and more remote destinations, including Banggai in the Banggai Islands and Gorontalo. It previously operated direct services to Jakarta, although these flights have since been discontinued.

== History ==
=== Construction and early history ===
Plans for the construction of an airport serving Luwuk had already been proposed by the Indonesian government as early as 1969. In 1972, the Commander of the Indonesian Army's Military Regional Command (Kodam) VII/Wirabuana, headquartered in Manado, North Sulawesi, ordered the construction of an airfield in Banggai Regency. At the time, the regency was administered by Regent Azis Larekeng.

Following a feasibility survey, the Banggai Regency Government selected a site in Luwuk District, specifically in Bubung Village, for the construction of the airfield. The initial facility consisted of an 850 × 30 m runway, a 50 × 40 m apron, and basic communication facilities. Its construction formed part of a government program to establish 16 airstrips serving rural areas across Indonesia between 1974 and 1975.

The newly constructed airfield was first visited by a DHC-6 Twin Otter operated by Merpati Nusantara Airlines, as well as a helicopter. Its inauguration was marked by a ceremonial release of pigeons by Regent Azis Larekeng. To commemorate the occasion, the regent invited Syukuran Aminuddin Amir, a respected elder and the last Raja of Banggai, to name the airfield. He named it “Bubung”, after the village in which it was located. In the Saluan language, bubung means “well.”

Bubung Airfield was subsequently developed and began commercial operations in 1974, with scheduled services operated by Merpati Nusantara Airlines. At the time, Merpati operated a regular route connecting Manado, Luwuk, Poso, Palu, and Tolitoli using DHC-6 Twin Otter aircraft.

=== Contemporary history ===
As air travel in the region developed, the airport gradually accommodated a wider range of aircraft, including the DHC-6 Twin Otter, CASA C-212, Fokker F27, Fokker F28, and Fokker 100. By 2008, the airport was capable of handling narrow-body aircraft such as the Boeing 737-200, which was operated by Batavia Air and Merpati Nusantara Airlines following the extension of its runway to 1,950 m. At the time, the airport had limited navigational infrastructure, consisting of a 50-watt non-directional beacon (NDB), and was staffed by only 20 personnel.

In 2008, the airport was renamed Syukuran Aminuddin Amir Airport in honor of Syukuran Aminuddin Amir, the 21st and final Raja of Banggai, who played a significant role in the development of the Banggai region and supported the integration of the former kingdom into the Republic of Indonesia during the struggle against Dutch colonial rule. The renaming coincided with broader efforts to improve the airport's infrastructure and operational capacity.

In 2009, the airport was equipped with a Precision Approach Path Indicator (PAPI) system as part of efforts by the airport authorities and the Banggai Regency Government to improve its navigational facilities and enable it to accommodate larger aircraft, particularly the Boeing 737-300.

In January 2010, the airport underwent technical verification by the Directorate General of Civil Aviation and was cleared to accommodate Boeing 737-300 aircraft. Following the approval, Merpati Nusantara Airlines and Batavia Air operated scheduled services connecting Luwuk with Jakarta, Surabaya, and Makassar, while in April 2010, Express Air introduced a return service between Manado, Luwuk, and Palu using Dornier 328-100 aircraft. The service initially operated three times per week before being increased to daily flights.

In 2012, the airport underwent an upgrade funded by Rp50.5 billion from the state budget (APBN), following which the airport was designated as a Class II airport. Airlines operating at the airport at that time included Express Air, serving Manado and Palu; Sriwijaya Air, serving Makassar, Jakarta, and Surabaya; Wings Air, serving Manado, Palu, and Makassar; Garuda Indonesia, serving Makassar, Jakarta, and Surabaya; and Lion Air, serving Makassar. At the time, Sriwijaya Air operated flights between Makassar and Luwuk using Boeing 737-500 aircraft.

Between 2017 and 2018, the airport underwent further development, including the construction of a new passenger terminal and upgrades to its airside facilities. The development was later linked to a corruption case involving the land acquisition for a Doppler VHF Omnidirectional Range (DVOR) navigation facility. The case involved the airport's director and the Head of the Banggai Regional Secretariat's Land Administration Division, with the alleged corruption resulting in state losses of Rp973 million.

== Facilities and development ==
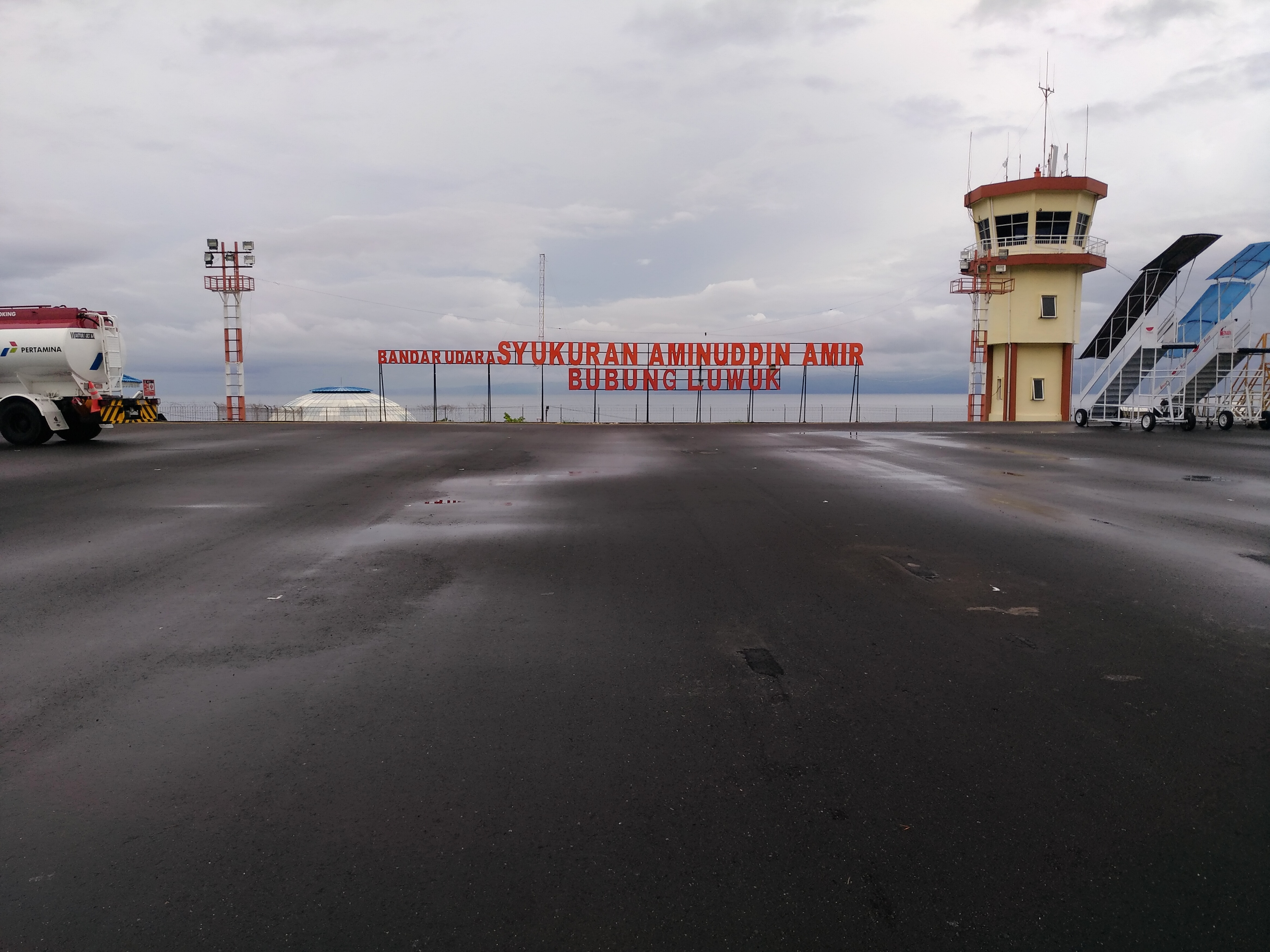
ATC tower

In the past, the airport's old terminal faced problems due to inadequate maintenance and increasing passenger traffic, prompting then-Minister of Transportation Ignasius Jonan to order its renovation in 2015. The Banggai Regency Government initially proposed constructing a new terminal across the runway, but the proposal was rejected due to the area's hilly terrain. Following further consideration, it was decided that the new passenger terminal would instead be built adjacent to the existing terminal. The new terminal was inaugurated by then-President Joko Widodo on 23 December 2018. Covering an area of 5,000 m², the new terminal can accommodate up to 350 passengers per hour during peak periods, compared with the previous terminal, which covered only 1,212 m² and had a capacity of approximately 100 passengers per hour. The new terminal was also designed to withstand earthquakes, drawing on lessons from the earthquake that struck Palu several months earlier.

On the airside, the runway was also extended and widened to 2,250 m × 45 m, enabling the airport to accommodate narrow-body aircraft such as the Boeing 737 and Airbus A320. The apron currently measures 315 m × 85 m, capable of accommodating approximately 3–4 narrow-body aircraft simultaneously, such as the Boeing 737 and Airbus A320, as well as turboprop aircraft such as the ATR 72, and is also equipped with two taxiways, each measuring 60 m × 18 m. The runway is planned to be further extended to 2,500 m by 2030, subject to the completion of the planned development.

== Airlines and destinations ==
Airlines	Destinations
Batik Air	Makassar
Susi Air	Banggai Laut, Gorontalo
Wings Air	Manado, Palu

== Statistics ==
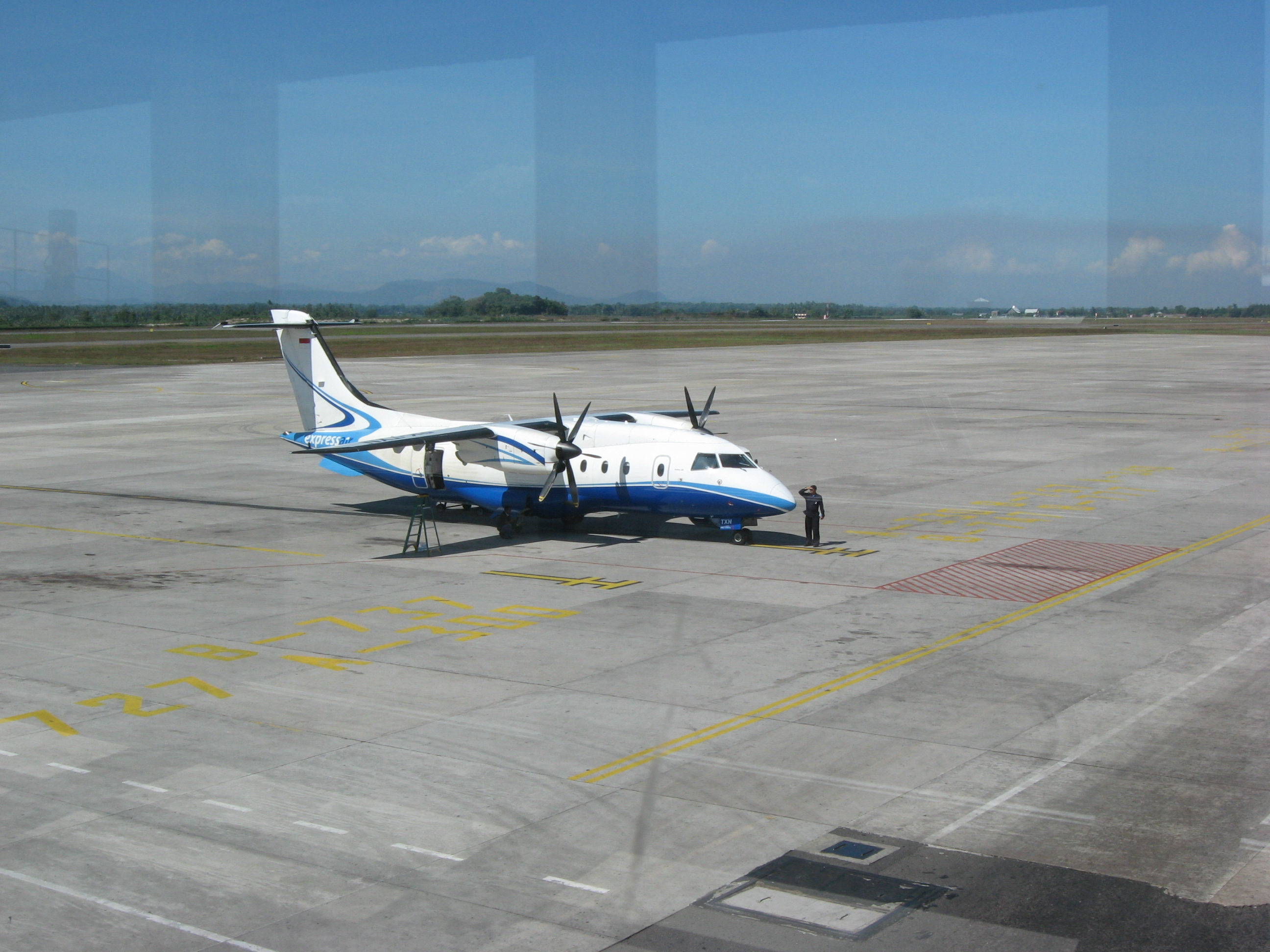
An Express Air Dornier 328-100 at Syukuran Aminuddin Amir Airport

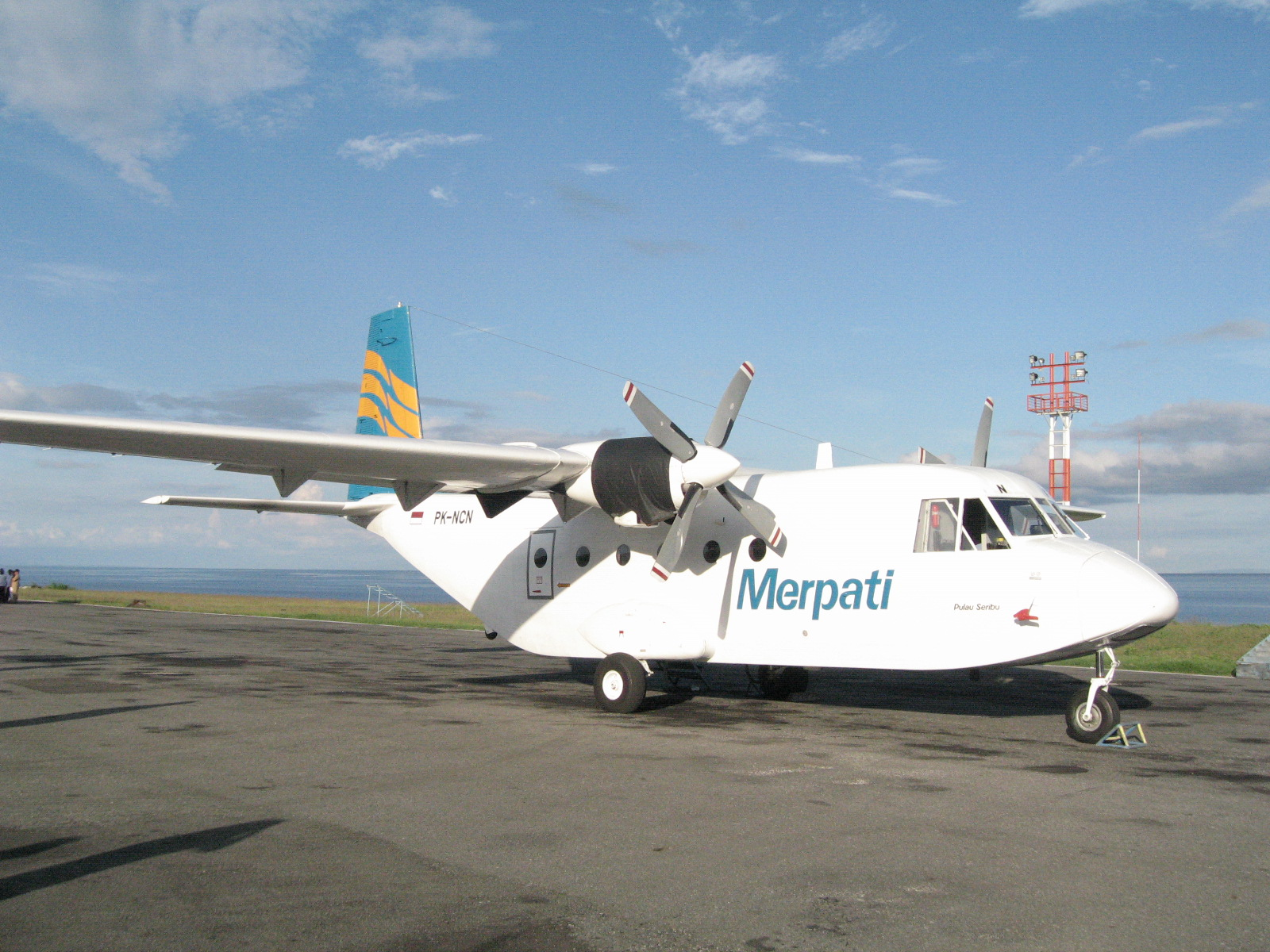
An Merpati Nusantara Airlines CASA C-212 at Syukuran Aminuddin Amir Airport

Annual passenger numbers and aircraft statistics
Year	Passengers handled	Passenger % change	Cargo (tonnes)	Cargo % change	Aircraft movements	Aircraft % change
2006	32,352	Steady	53.25	Steady	1,627	Steady
2007	43,319	▲33.90	110.24	▲107.02	N/A	Steady
2008	114,812	▲165.04	277.82	▲152.01	1,985	Steady
2009	61,287	▼46.62	628.25	▲126.14	1,084	▼45.39
2010	89,550	▲46.12	584.43	▼6.97	1,355	▲25.00
2011	110,500	▲23.39	384.53	▼34.20	2,102	▲55.13
2012	149,095	▲34.93	650.01	▲69.04	2,296	▲9.23
2013	155,755	▲4.47	807.00	▲24.15	2,091	▼8.93
2014	123,602	▼20.64	650.74	▼19.36	1,967	▼5.93
2015	234,429	▲89.66	933.48	▲43.45	3,816	▲94.00
2016	324,470	▲38.41	482.00	▼48.37	5,791	▲51.76
2017	358,780	▲10.57	1,055.48	▲118.98	5,713	▼1.35
2018	327,738	▼8.65	1,109.91	▲5.16	4,841	▼15.26
2019	272,408	▼16.88	672.12	▼39.44	4,006	▼17.25
2020	120,588	▼55.73	574.46	▼14.53	2,019	▼49.60
2021	443,853	▲268.07	963.61	▲67.74	1,716	▼15.01
2022	173,234	▼60.97	1,096.93	▲13.84	1,990	▲15.97
2023	173,132	▼0.06	862.42	▼21.38	1,822	▼8.44
2024	177,342	▲2.43	687.71	▼20.26	1,576	▼13.50
^{Source: DGCA, BPS}

== Accidents and incidents ==
- On 28 June 2017, an ambulance and a group of people accompanying a passenger entered the airport apron without authorization, after the passenger, who was travelling to Makassar for medical treatment, had received clearance from the airport health quarantine authorities. The incident occurred while Wings Air flight IW 1221 was preparing for departure, prompting the pilot to contact air traffic control and resulting in a delay of approximately two hours. Airport security subsequently secured the accompanying group and cleared the apron. The airport authorities attributed the incident to a lack of public understanding of airport regulations and planned to conduct further outreach to local government authorities and hospitals regarding access restrictions within the airport.
