= Pogogul Airport =

Airport in Indonesia

Pogogul Airport Bandar Udara Pogogul
- IATA: UOL; ICAO: WAFY

Summary
- Airport type: Public
- Serves: Buol Regency, Central Sulawesi, Sulawesi Island, Indonesia
- Time zone: WITA (UTC+08:00)
- Elevation AMSL: 5 m / 16 ft
- Coordinates: 01°06′03″N 121°24′58″E

Map
- Location of the airport in Sulawesi

Runways
Direction	Length		Surface
Direction	m	ft	Surface
06/24	1,545	5,069	Asphalt

Pogogul Airport (Indonesian: Bandar Udara Pogogul) (IATA: UOL, ICAO: WAFY) is a public airport near Buol, a city in the province of Central Sulawesi on the island of Sulawesi in Indonesia.

== Facilities ==
The airport resides at an elevation of 15 metres (49 ft) above mean sea level. It has one runway designated 06/24 with a compacted coral and sand surface measuring 1,500 by 30 metres (4,921 ft × 98 ft).

== Airlines and destinations ==
Airlines	Destinations
Susi Air	Gorontalo
Wings Air	Palu
