= Sultan Bantilan Airport =

Sultan Bantilan Airport Bandar Udara Sultan Bantilan
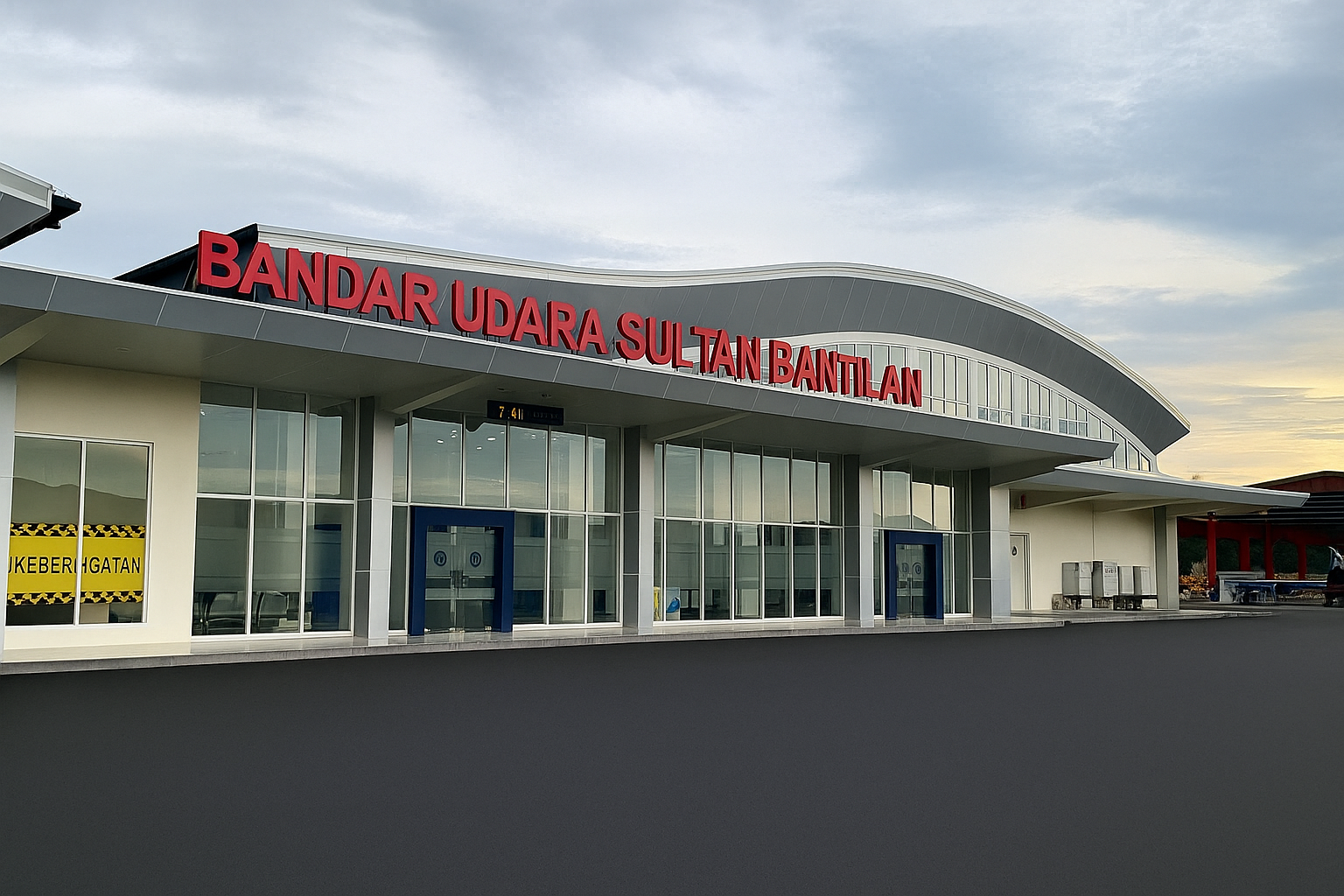
- IATA: TLI; ICAO: WAFL

Summary
- Airport type: Public
- Owner: Government of Indonesia
- Operator: Directorate General of Civil Aviation
- Serves: Tolitoli
- Location: Galang District, Tolitoli Regency, Central Sulawesi, Sulawesi Island, Indonesia
- Time zone: WITA (UTC+08:00)
- Elevation AMSL: 5 m (16 ft)
- Coordinates: 01°07′24.34″N 120°47′37.17″E

Map
- Location of the airport in Sulawesi

Runways
| Direction | Length | | Surface |
| Direction | m | ft | Surface |
|---|---|---|---|
| 11/29 | 1,400 | 4,593 | Asphalt |

Statistics (2024)
- Passengers: 3,499 (▲0.9%)
- Cargo (tonnes): 0.14
- Aircraft movements: 104 (▼7.1%)
- Source: DGCA

Sultan Bantilan Airport (IATA: TLI, ICAO: WAFL), formerly known as Lalos Airport, is a domestic regional airport serving Tolitoli, the administrative seat of Tolitoli Regency in Central Sulawesi, Indonesia. The airport is named after Bantilan Syaifuddin, a 19th-century ruler of the Kingdom of Tolitoli. It is located in Lalos village, Galang District, approximately 9 km (5.6 mi) from central Tolitoli, and serves as the main air gateway to Tolitoli Regency and the surrounding areas. Wings Air is currently the sole airline operating at the airport, providing scheduled flights between Tolitoli and Palu, the provincial capital of Central Sulawesi. In the past, the airport was also served by TransNusa and the now-defunct Merpati Nusantara Airlines, which operated scheduled flights to Tolitoli.

== History ==
=== Construction and early history ===
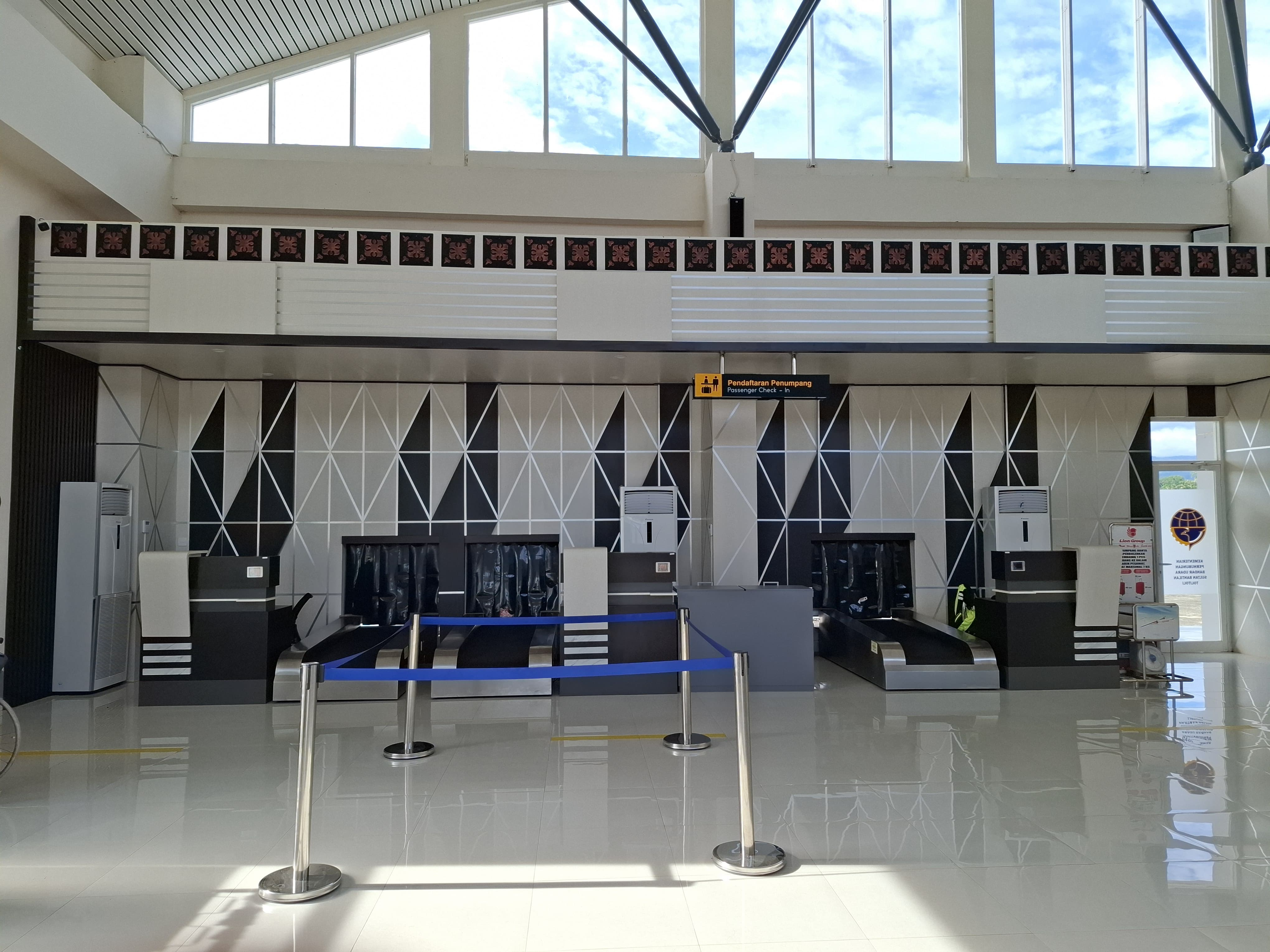
Check-in counters

Planning for the construction of the airport dates back to 1975, during the tenure of Regent Eddy Soeroso. He envisioned the airport as a means of promoting the development of Tolitoli Regency, which he considered to be lagging behind other regencies in Central Sulawesi, such as Banggai, Donggala, and Poso. The proposed airport was intended to operate as a pioneer airport, serving small regional aircraft such as the de Havilland Canada DHC-6 Twin Otter. The airport was ultimately completed and officially inaugurated in 1978. At the time, the airport was known as Lalos Airport, named after the village in which it was located.

During its early years of operation, the airport served as a primary gateway supporting the distribution of the region’s key commodities, particularly cloves, which have become a defining product of Tolitoli Regency. By the late 1970s, several airlines had begun serving the airport, with Bouraq Indonesian Airlines and Merpati Nusantara Airlines both operating scheduled flights to Tolitoli. Bouraq operated a Manado–Gorontalo–Tolitoli service, while Merpati Nusantara Airlines served the Palu–Tolitoli route.

In 1994, the government announced plans to revitalize passenger terminals and undertake other infrastructure improvements at several airports across Indonesia, with Tolitoli Airport included in the program. The project involved upgrades to both the passenger terminal and airside facilities to improve the airport's overall capacity and operational capabilities. Merpati continued operating flights between Palu and Tolitoli until around 2000, when the airline discontinued the route. The airport was subsequently closed after its infrastructure sustained damage, forcing the suspension of flight operations. It was eventually reactivated by the government in 2003. Subsequently, Merpati resumed flights to Tolitoli in March 2003, operating the Palu–Tolitoli–Buol route under a subsidy provided by the Tolitoli Regency government. It subsequently launched another route connecting Tolitoli with Tarakan in then-East Kalimantan in 2004.

On 9 September 2009, the airport suffered significant damage following a magnitude 6.0 earthquake that struck Tolitoli. The departure area was particularly affected, with severe cracks appearing on both sides of the building and extending into the adjacent VIP room. Cracks were also reported in various other parts of the terminal, including the toilets and passenger waiting area. Despite the structural damage, all scheduled flights continued to operate normally on the day of the earthquake.

=== Contemporary history ===
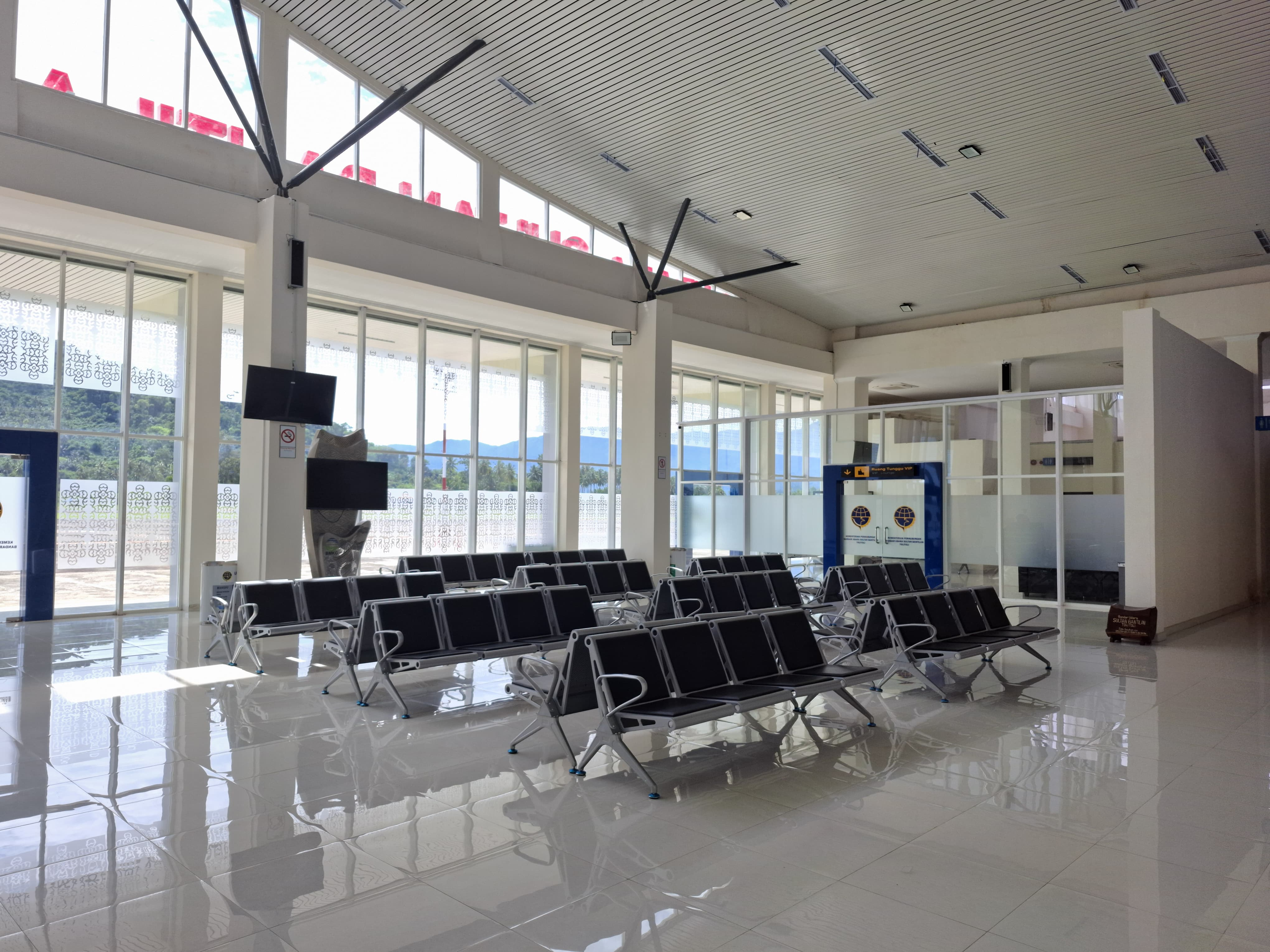
Boarding gate

The revitalization of the airport took several years following the earthquake. In 2011, the government allocated Rp3.7 billion for the rehabilitation of the airport and the construction of several new facilities. The funding included Rp1.4 billion for the construction of a new terminal, Rp300 million for the renovation of the existing terminal, Rp1.4 billion for drainage improvements, Rp300 million for the procurement of a baggage conveyor, and Rp300 million for the acquisition of an airfield lighting vehicle. In 2012, the airport received a further and significantly larger allocation of Rp8.5 billion. The funds were intended for land filling and the rehabilitation of the airport's shoulder areas. However, both the 2012 project and the development works carried out the previous year were reportedly plagued by various issues, resulting in delays and other complications.

In 2010, the airport was renamed Sultan Bantilan Airport under a decree issued by the Ministry of Transportation, adopting the name it bears today. The name Sultan Bantilan honors a prominent figure in Tolitoli’s local history, Sultan Bantilan Syaifuddin, who was the son of Raja Meletua and ruled the Kingdom of Tolitoli during the mid-19th century. The adoption of his name reflects an effort to preserve the collective memory of Tolitoli’s royal heritage and its period of prominence under the influence of Islam and the Sultanate of Ternate.

On 22 October 2014, Wings Air inaugurated the Palu–Tolitoli route, operating ATR 72-500/600 aircraft. As of 2026, Wings Air remains the sole airline providing scheduled passenger services at the airport. Previously, TransNusa also operated the Palu–Tolitoli route using ATR 72-600 aircraft, with onward connections to Makassar. The service was launched on 25 July 2019 but was discontinued on 1 November 2019 after operating for just over three months. Kalstar Aviation previously operated the Tanjung Selor–Tarakan–Tolitoli–Palu route using ATR 42-500 aircraft. The service was launched in November 2016 but was discontinued the following year after Kalstar Aviation ceased operations.

During the COVID-19 pandemic, between 2020 and 2023, the airport underwent a series of repairs, renovations, and facility upgrades. The works included improvements to the terminal waiting area and the addition of supporting amenities, with funding provided through the state budget (APBN).

== Facilities and development ==
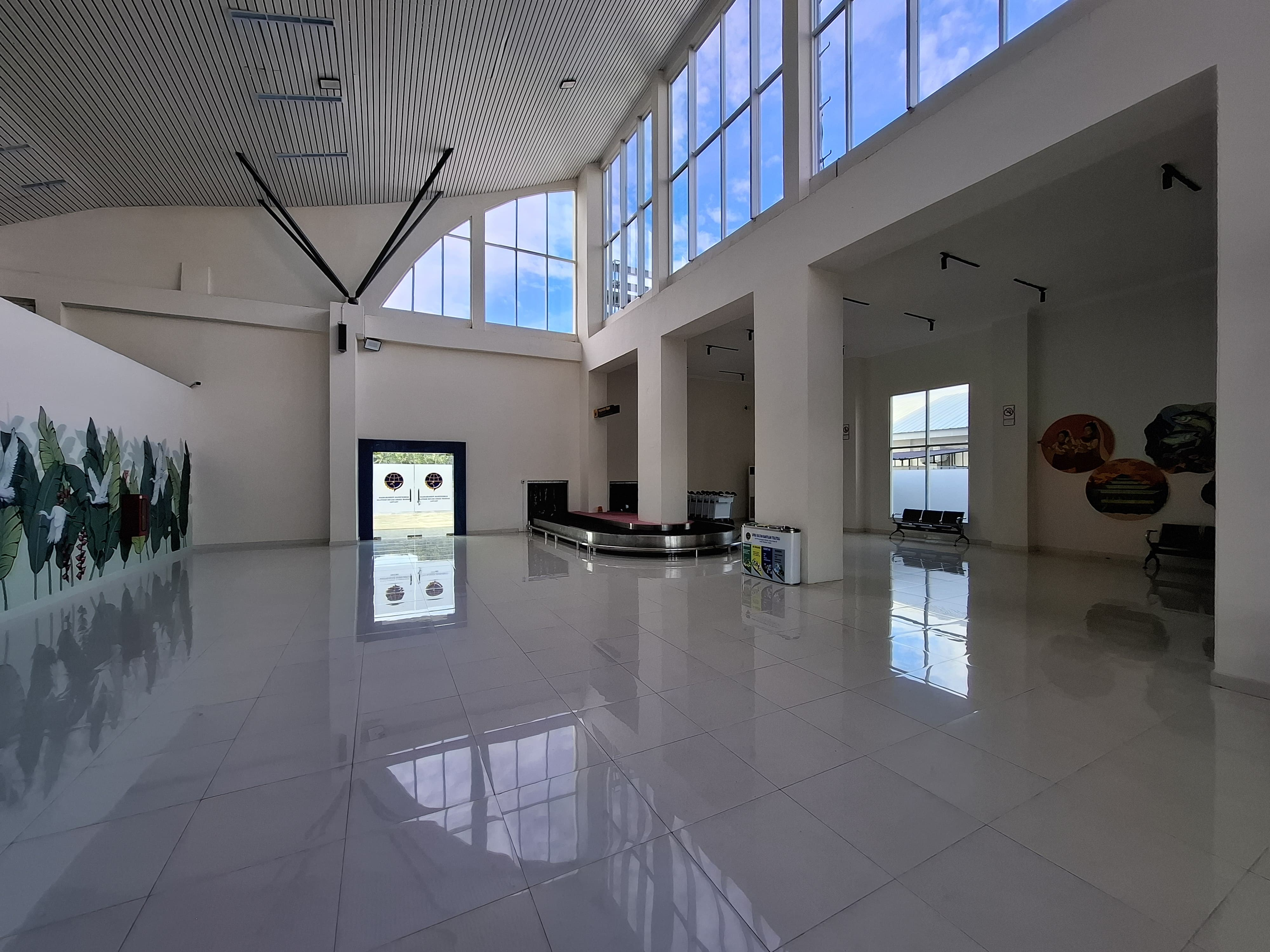
Baggage claim area

The landside and supporting ground facilities at Sultan Bantilan Airport include a 1,500 m² domestic passenger terminal with a capacity of 10,000 passengers per year, featuring dedicated check-in, departure, and arrival areas including baggage carrousels. In 2021, proposals were put forward to construct a new and more spacious passenger terminal, with the existing terminal planned for demolition. Under the proposal, the VIP terminal would be temporarily converted into a passenger terminal to accommodate operations during the construction period.

Cargo logistics are handled by a dedicated 192.50 m² cargo terminal building located adjacent to the passenger terminal. Ground transport and traveler vehicles are accommodated by a spacious 2,700 m² parking and landscape area, alongside 2,100 m² of internal access roads. Essential public amenities provided on-site include an airfield canteen, public restrooms, free Wi-Fi, and a prayer room (mushola). The facility also features supporting land structures, including two administrative buildings totaling 320 m², a 500 m² retaining wall, and localized residential complex quarters for airport staff. In addition, the airport is also equipped with a 300 m² aircraft rescue and fire fighting (PKP-PK) building.

On the airside, the airport has a single runway measuring 1,400 m by 30 m, which currently limits operations to regional turboprop aircraft such as the ATR 42 and ATR 72. The runway is currently already equipped with an Airfield Lighting System (AFL) and a Precision Approach Path Indicator (PAPI) system. Proposals have been considered to extend the runway to 1,800 m, with a potential further extension to 2,000 m, enabling the airport to accommodate larger narrow-body aircraft such as the Boeing 737 and Airbus A320. Such an expansion would also improve the airport’s connectivity by potentially enabling direct flights to major cities in the region including Makassar, Balikpapan, and Manado. As of 2025, the proposed runway extension remained pending government approval and the allocation of funding.

In addition to the runway, the airport is equipped with a single taxiway measuring 75 m × 15 m and a single aircraft apron measuring 125 m × 70 m.

== Airlines and destinations ==
| Airlines | Destinations |
|---|---|
| Wings Air | Palu |

== Statistics ==
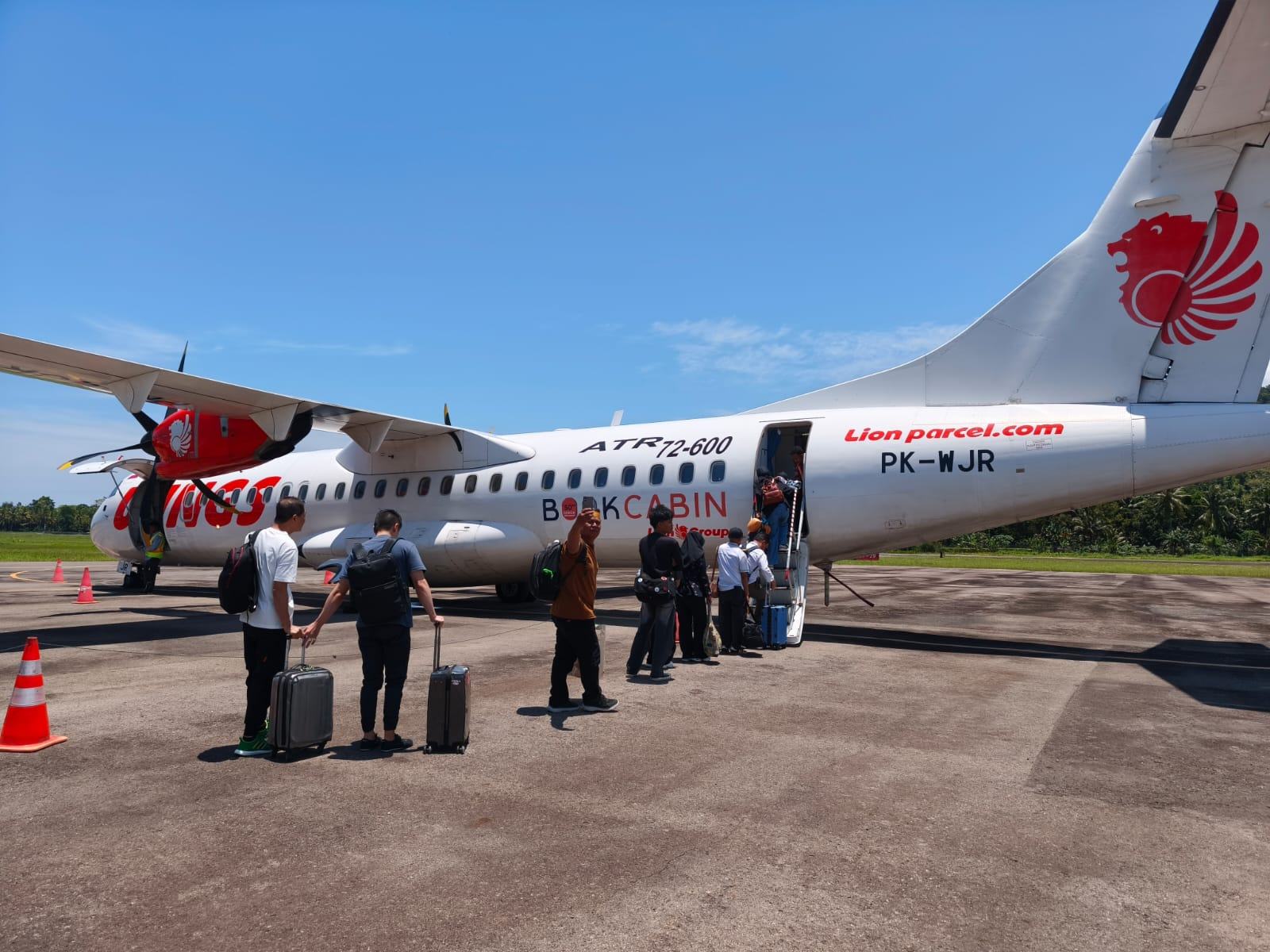
A Wings Air ATR 72-600 at Sultan Bantilan Airport

Annual passenger numbers and aircraft statistics
| Year | Passengers handled | Passenger % change | Cargo (tonnes) | Cargo % change | Aircraft movements | Aircraft % change |
|---|---|---|---|---|---|---|
| 2006 | 3,537 | Steady | N/A | Steady | 288 | Steady |
| 2007 | 2,966 | ▼16.1 | N/A | Steady | 174 | ▼39.6 |
| 2008 | 1,093 | ▼63.1 | N/A | Steady | 81 | ▼53.4 |
| 2009 | 1,431 | ▲30.9 | N/A | Steady | 308 | ▲280.2 |
| 2010 | 2,931 | ▲104.8 | N/A | Steady | 351 | ▲14.0 |
| 2011 | 6,266 | ▲113.8 | N/A | Steady | 446 | ▲27.1 |
| 2012 | 16,321 | ▲160.5 | N/A | Steady | 710 | ▲59.2 |
| 2013 | 14,578 | ▼0.7 | N/A | Steady | 600 | ▼15.5 |
| 2014 | 7,661 | ▼47.4 | N/A | Steady | 297 | ▼50.5 |
| 2015 | 19,946 | ▲160.4 | N/A | Steady | 521 | ▲75.4 |
| 2016 | 32,722 | ▲64.1 | N/A | Steady | 750 | ▲44.0 |
| 2017 | 37,998 | ▲16.1 | 11.43 | Steady | 636 | ▼15.2 |
| 2018 | 31,362 | ▼17.5 | 12.56 | ▲9.9 | 686 | ▲7.9 |
| 2019 | 28,774 | ▼8.3 | 28.70 | ▲128.5 | 796 | ▲16.0 |
| 2020 | 7,522 | ▼73.9 | 6.43 | ▼77.6 | 192 | ▼75.9 |
| 2021 | 2,750 | ▼63.4 | 1.77 | ▼72.5 | 93 | ▼ -51.6 |
| 2022 | 6,389 | ▲132.3 | 0.06 | ▼96.6 | 168 | ▲80.6 |
| 2023 | 3,468 | ▼45.7 | N/A | Steady | 112 | ▼33.3 |
| 2024 | 3,499 | ▲0.9 | 0.14 | Steady | 104 | ▼7.1 |
^{Source: DGCA, BPS}
