= Djalaluddin Airport =

Djalaluddin Airport Bandar Udara Djalaluddin
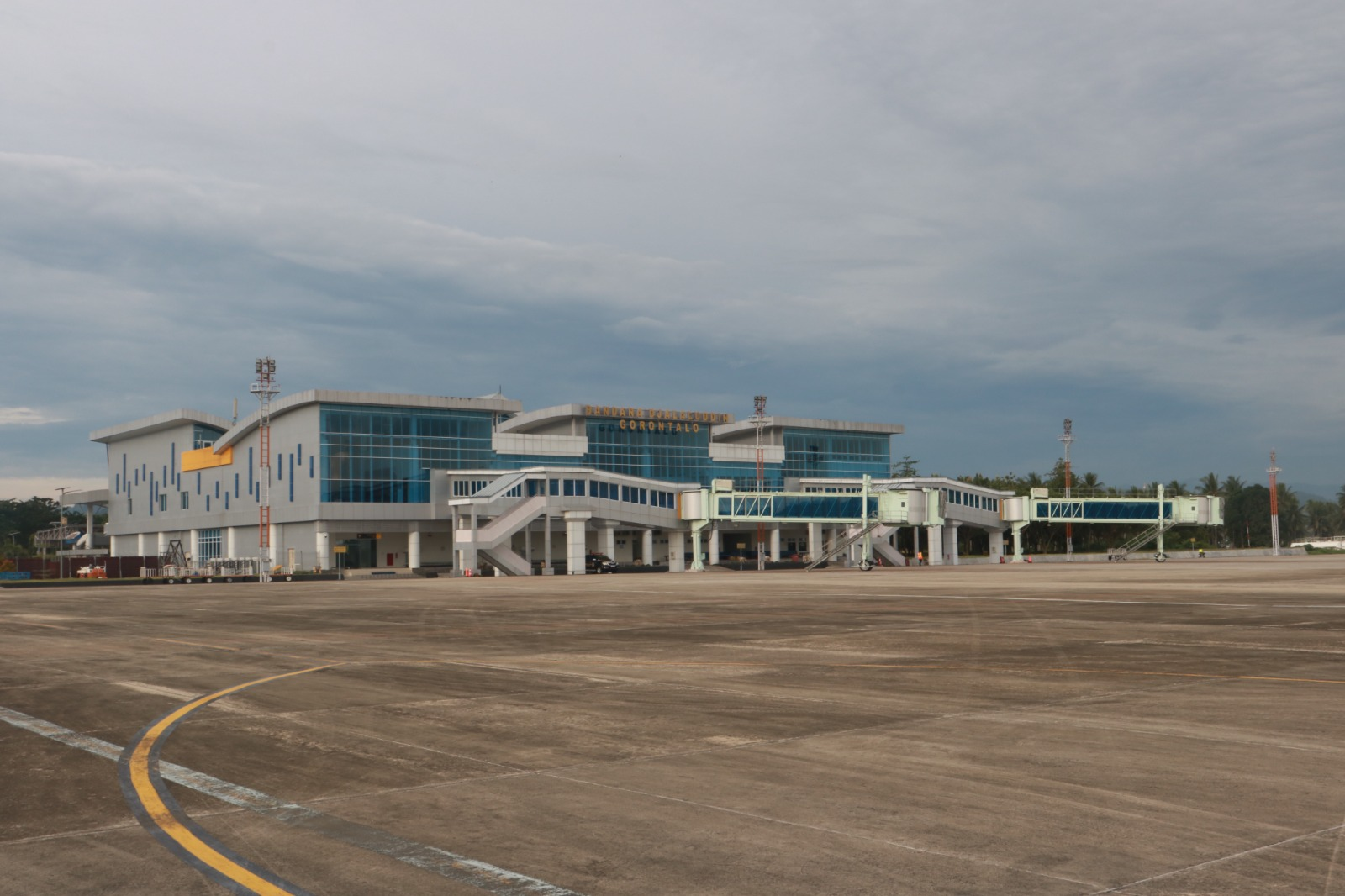
- IATA: GTO; ICAO: WAMG; WMO: 97048

Summary
- Airport type: Public
- Owner: Government of Indonesia
- Operator: Directorate General of Civil Aviation
- Serves: Gorontalo
- Location: Tibawa, Gorontalo Regency, Gorontalo, Indonesia
- Time zone: WITA (UTC+08:00)
- Elevation AMSL: 18 m (59 ft)
- Coordinates: 00°38′14″N 122°50′59.5″E

Maps
- Sulawesi region in Indonesia

- Location of airport in Gorontalo / Indonesia GTO (Indonesia)

Runways
Direction	Length		Surface
Direction	m	ft	Surface
09/27	2,500	8,202	Asphalt

Statistics (2024)
- Passengers: 339,823 (▲1.2%)
- Cargo (tonnes): 6,111 (▲44.9%)
- Aircraft movements: 3,770 (▲6.5%)
- Source: DGCA

Djalaluddin Airport (IATA: GTO, ICAO: WAMG), formerly Tolotio Airport, is a domestic airport serving Gorontalo, the provincial capital and largest city of Gorontalo Province on the island of Sulawesi, Indonesia. Although the airport primarily serves Gorontalo, it is not located within the city limit itself, but in Tibawa, Gorontalo Regency, approximately 24 km (14.9 miles) from Gorontalo city center. The airport is managed by the Directorate General of Civil Aviation of the Ministry of Transportation. Djalaluddin Airport serves as the main air gateway to Gorontalo and is named after Djalaluddin Tantu, a colonel in the Indonesian Air Force who was from Gorontalo. He was killed during the Indonesia–Malaysia confrontation in 1964, when the C-130 Hercules he was flying was shot down over Malaysia. The airport currently operates domestic services to major cities in Sulawesi, including Makassar and Manado, as well as direct services to Jakarta. It also provides air connectivity to several smaller and more remote destinations in the surrounding region.

== History ==
=== Construction and early history ===
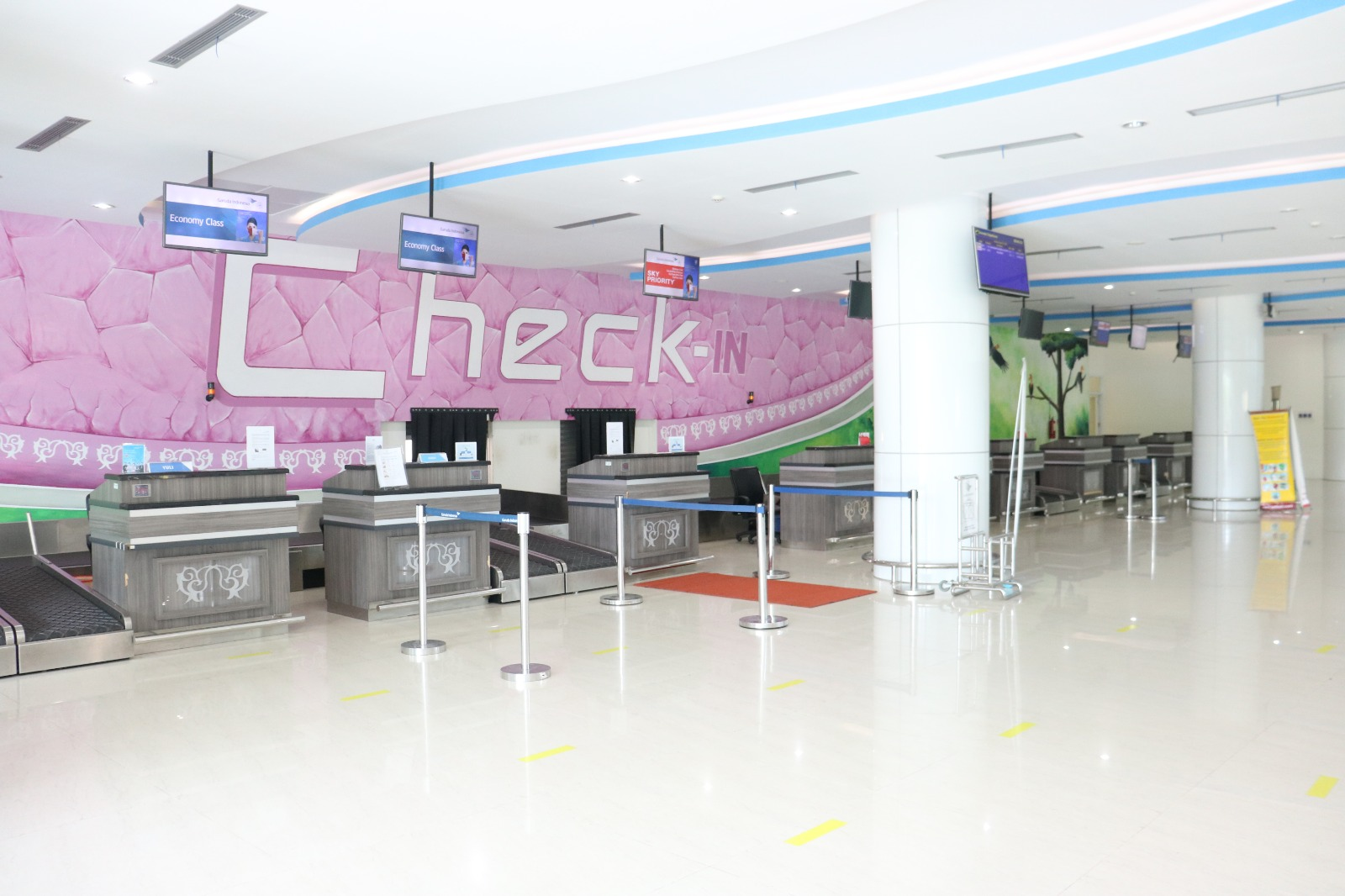
Check-in hall

The first aircraft to land in Gorontalo was a Grumman HU-16 Albatross in 1955. Around the same time, a small airfield was constructed at Tolotio to support military transport operations and facilitate the integration and defence of Indonesia’s territory. Following its completion in 1956, a Douglas DC-3 made the first aircraft landing at Tolotio Airport. The airport subsequently commenced commercial operations in June 1957, when Garuda Indonesia inaugurated a scheduled service between Gorontalo and Manado.

When the Permesta rebellion erupted in early 1958, the airfield was captured by Permesta forces and subsequently used as an airbase by the Permesta Air Force (Angkatan Udara Revolusioner, AUREV). It served as a base for AUREV's American-supplied military aircraft, which were used to conduct operations against government forces. The airfield was defended by elite Permesta units, many of whose personnel were former members of the Royal Netherlands East Indies Army (KNIL), in anticipation of a possible assault by government forces. In May 1958, the Indonesian Army and the Indonesian Air Force launched a major joint military operation, codenamed Operation Saptamarga II, to recapture Gorontalo and Tolotio Airfield from Permesta forces. Following a series of air raids on the airfield and a two-pronged ground assault, the operation culminated in the capture of the airfield by government forces on 1 June 1958. The capture of the airfield was a major blow to the Permesta, as it enabled government forces to launch attacks against Permesta strongholds in Manado and other parts of North Sulawesi.

Following the end of the Permesta rebellion, Tolotio Airfield was taken over by the Indonesian Air Force. The conflict in eastern Indonesia throughout the late 1950s and 1960s severely disrupted air transport across the region, including in Gorontalo. During the height of the Western New Guinea dispute in the early 1960s, the airfield served as one of the Indonesian Air Force's major rear bases in preparation for Operation Trikora, the Indonesian campaign to seize Western New Guinea from the Netherlands. However, Tolotio was designated as a rear-area airfield rather than a frontline base, unlike airfields closer to the operational area, such as those at Ambon and Morotai. At the time, the airport had a 1,500-metre runway and was closed to civilian flights.

=== Contemporary history ===
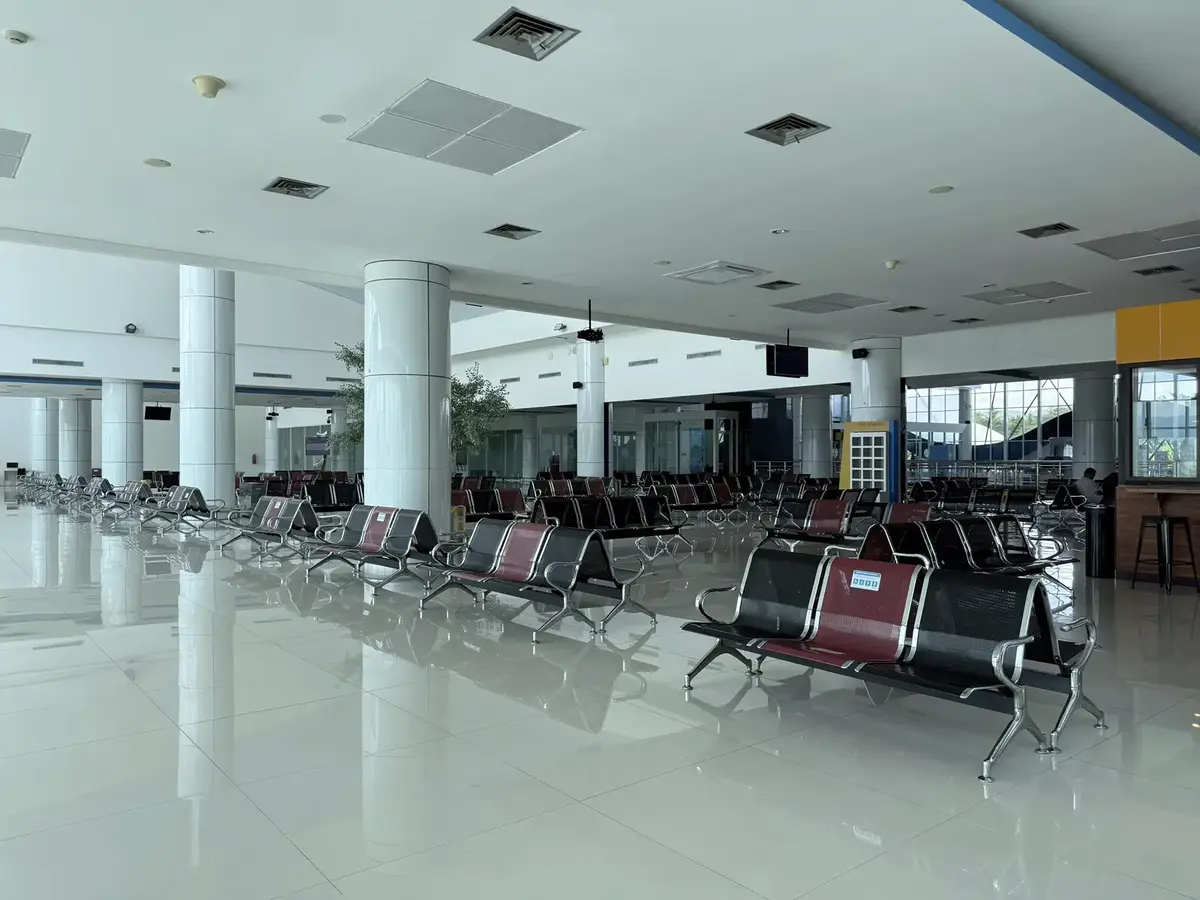
Boarding gate

Initially equipped with basic facilities, the airport was intended to serve as both a military airbase for the Indonesian Air Force and a commercial airport managed by the Directorate General of Civil Aviation.

In 1974, the airport was renamed Djalaluddin Airport in honor of Djalaluddin Tantu, an Indonesian Air Force pilot who was the first officer of Gorontaloan descent to serve as a captain in the Indonesian Air Force. Tantu was killed in the line of duty during the Indonesia–Malaysia confrontation. The renaming was proposed by the Armed Forces faction of the Gorontalo Regency parliament.

By the late 1970s, Djalaluddin Airport was served by several airlines, including Bouraq Indonesia Airlines and Merpati Nusantara Airlines. Bouraq operated four weekly flights to Palu, with onward connections to Makassar and Balikpapan, while Merpati operated services to Manado. Despite the growing number of scheduled services, the airport's facilities remained modest and were capable of accommodating only relatively small aircraft, such as the NAMC YS-11 and DHC-6 Twin Otter. In the mid-1980s, the airport underwent an upgrade that enabled it to accommodate larger aircraft, including the Fokker F27.

A new, significantly larger terminal began operations in May 2016, replacing the old and overcrowded one. The old terminal is now only used for Hajj Embarkation.

There are also proposals to upgrade the airport to international status by introducing routes to Malaysia and the Philippines. There are also plans to designate the airport as a Hajj embarkation point, which would enable pilgrims to travel directly to Jeddah, Saudi Arabia, without having to transit through Makassar. However, the Directorate General of Civil Aviation has identified several necessary improvements to the airport’s airside infrastructure, including runway extension, apron expansion, and upgrades to supporting aviation facilities, as technical prerequisites for the airport to serve as a Hajj embarkation point.

== Facilities and development ==
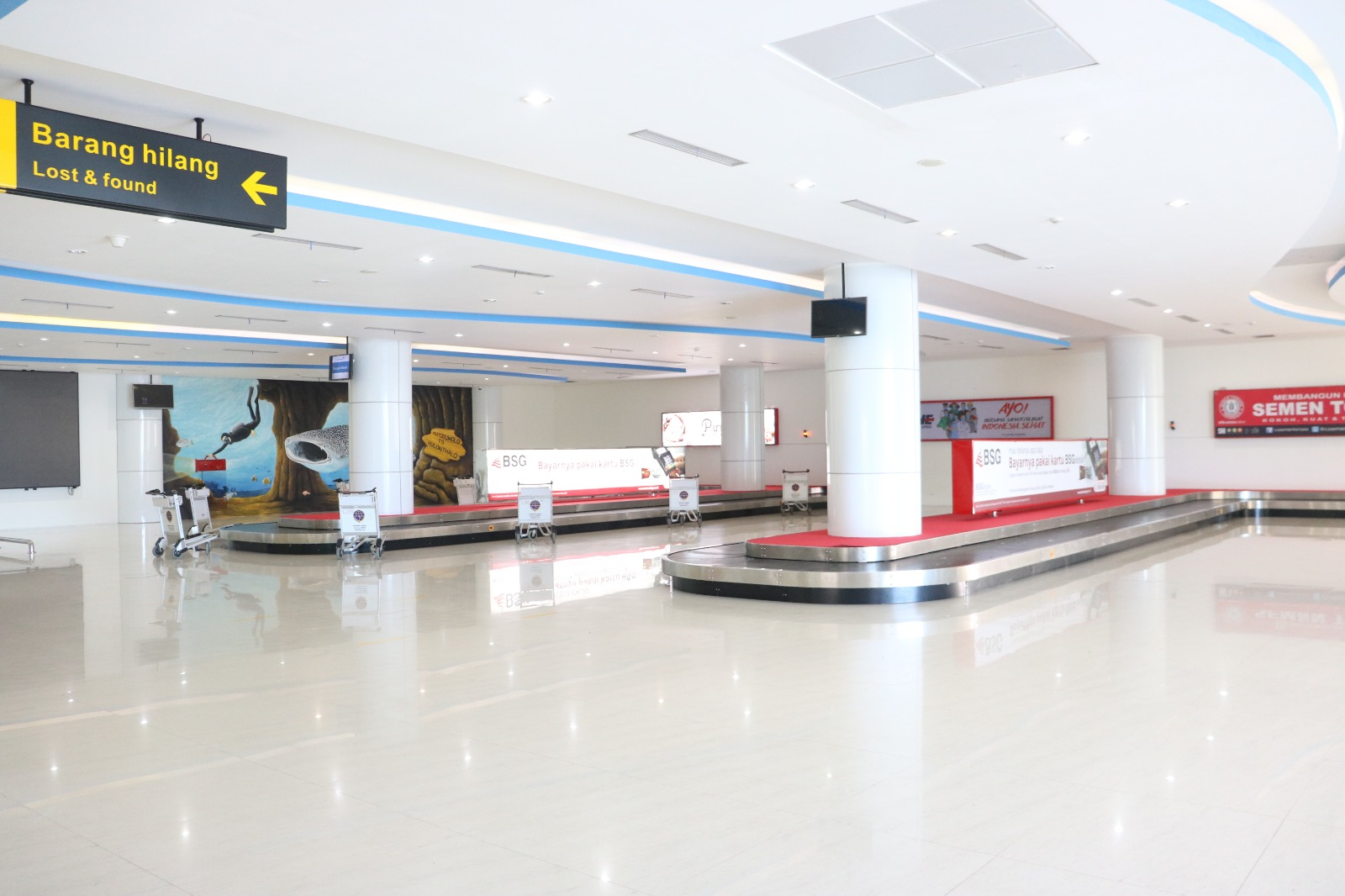
Baggage claim area

Built between 2013 and 2015 with funding from the central government, the new two-story terminal building spans nearly 12,000 m^{2} (130,000 sq ft) with 2 aerobridges and can accommodate 2,500 passengers, replacing the old terminal, which had a capacity of only 250. The ground floor houses check-in counters, drop-off and baggage claim areas, as well as spaces for the public and staff. The second floor features a spacious waiting room, along with additional public and employee areas. The terminal includes various amenities, such as mosques on both floors, lactation rooms, escalators, elevators, toilets, and wheelchairs for passengers with disabilities or medical conditions. There are also two medium-sized lounges, a spacious smoking room, and four X-ray units—three for passengers and one for cargo. Additionally, the parking area has been expanded from 3,902 m^{2} (42,000 sq ft), which previously accommodated 150 cars, to 46,411 m^{2} (499,560 sq ft), allowing for over 1,000 vehicles.

The airport is equipped with two airbridges and a newly constructed apron measuring 230 x 80 meters, enabling it to accommodate up to three Boeing 737 Next Generation and MAX aircraft, along with two ATR-72 planes. The airport's runway, currently 2,500 meters by 45 meters, was originally slated for an extension to 3,000 meters by 2019. However, as of 2022, the extension has yet to be realized. The plan was revived in 2023, with the airport envisioned to serve Hajj flights and be equipped with a parallel taxiway.

== Airlines and destinations ==
=== Passenger ===
Airlines	Destinations
Batik Air	Jakarta–Soekarno-Hatta
Garuda Indonesia	Jakarta–Soekarno-Hatta
Lion Air	Jakarta–Soekarno-Hatta, (Note: Jakarta–Soekarno-Hatta is the continuation of Makassar flights with the same flight number.) Makassar
Susi Air	Bolaang Mongondow, Buol, Luwuk, Pohuwato
Wings Air	Manado

== Statistics ==
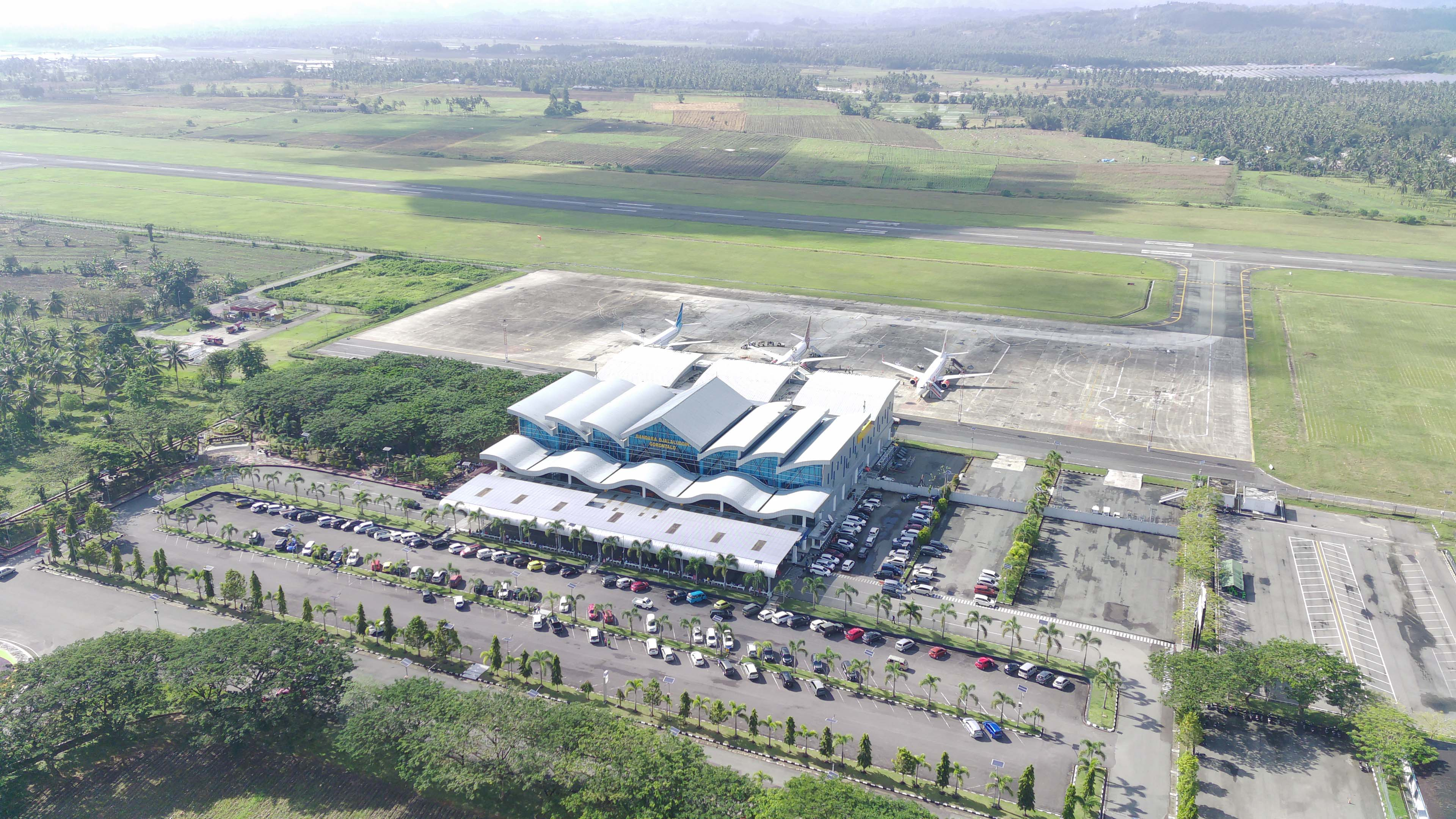
Aerial view of the airport

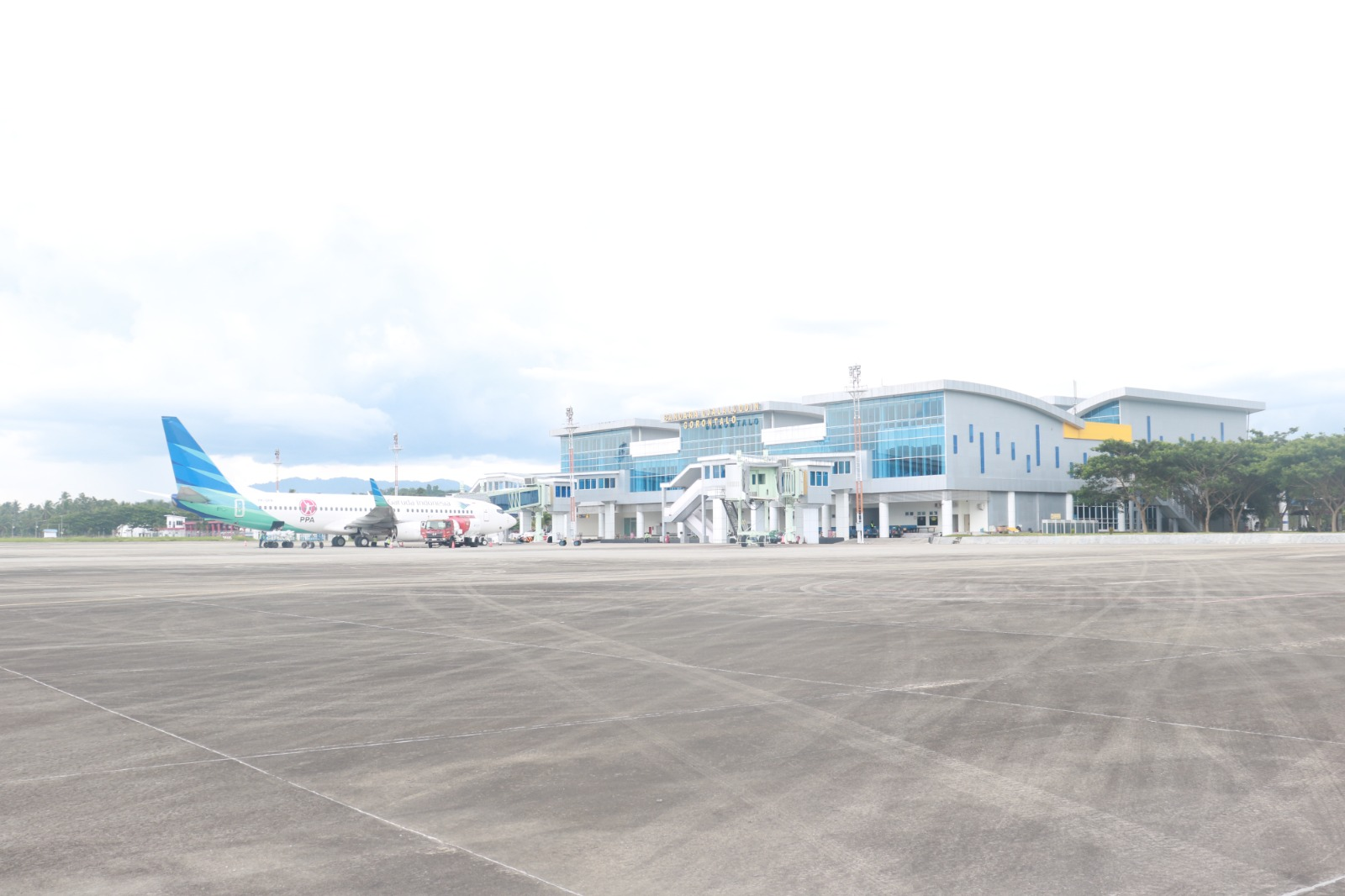
A Garuda Indonesia Boeing 737-800 at Djalaluddin Airport

Annual passenger numbers and aircraft statistics
Year	Passengers handled	Passenger % change	Cargo (tonnes)	Cargo % change	Aircraft movements	Aircraft % change
2006	165,676	Steady	1,447	Steady	2,108	Steady
2007	185,674	▲12.1	1,735	▲19.9	2,276	▲8.0
2008	165,543	▼10.8	1,266	▼27.0	1,329	▼41.6
2009	231,983	▲40.1	1,501	▲18.6	2,210	▲66.3
2010	283,437	▲22.2	1,906	▲27.0	2,650	▲19.9
2011	349,620	▲23.4	2,302	▲20.8	3,286	▲24.0
2012	380,083	▲8.7	2,296	▲0.3	3,233	▼1.6
2013	439,847	▲15.7	3,594	▲56.5	4,068	▲25.8
2014	410,475	▼6.7	2,535	▼29.5	3,806	▼6.4
2015	487,497	▲18.8	2,697	▲6.4	4,949	▲30.0
2016	573,369	▲17.6	2,672	▼0.9	5,533	▲11.8
2017	647,757	▲13.0	4,252	▲59.1	6,767	▲22.3
2018	659,526	▲1.8	4,673	▲9.9	6,642	▼1.8
2019	496,343	▼24.7	3,809	▼18.5	4,935	▼25.7
2020	224,998	▼54.7	2,365	▼37.9	2,463	▼50.1
2021	179,587	▼20.2	2,224	▼6.0	1,787	▼27.4
2022	295,921	▲64.8	4,700	▲111.3	3,114	▲74.3
2023	335,915	▲13.5	4,217	▼10.3	3,539	▲13.6
2024	339,823	▲1.2	6,111	▲44.9	3,770	▲6.5
^{Source: DGCA, BPS}

== Ground transportation ==
Transport from Djalaluddin Airport to Gorontalo City center is possible through the following options:

- Bus

Perum DAMRI operates airport shuttle buses that serve several destinations from Djalaluddin Airport.

- Taxi

Various taxi and car rental services are provided by numerous service providers.

== Incidents ==
- On 6 August 2013, Lion Air Flight 897 struck a cow during landing. The aircraft slipped sideways onto the grass. None of the 117 people on board were injured.
- On 29 April 2018, Lion Air Flight 892, a Boeing 737-800 operating from Makassar to Gorontalo, skidded off the runway while landing at Djalaluddin Airport. All 174 people on board escaped unharmed.
