= Raja Loloda Mokoagow Airport =

Bolaang Mongondow Airport Bandar Udara Bolaang Mongondow
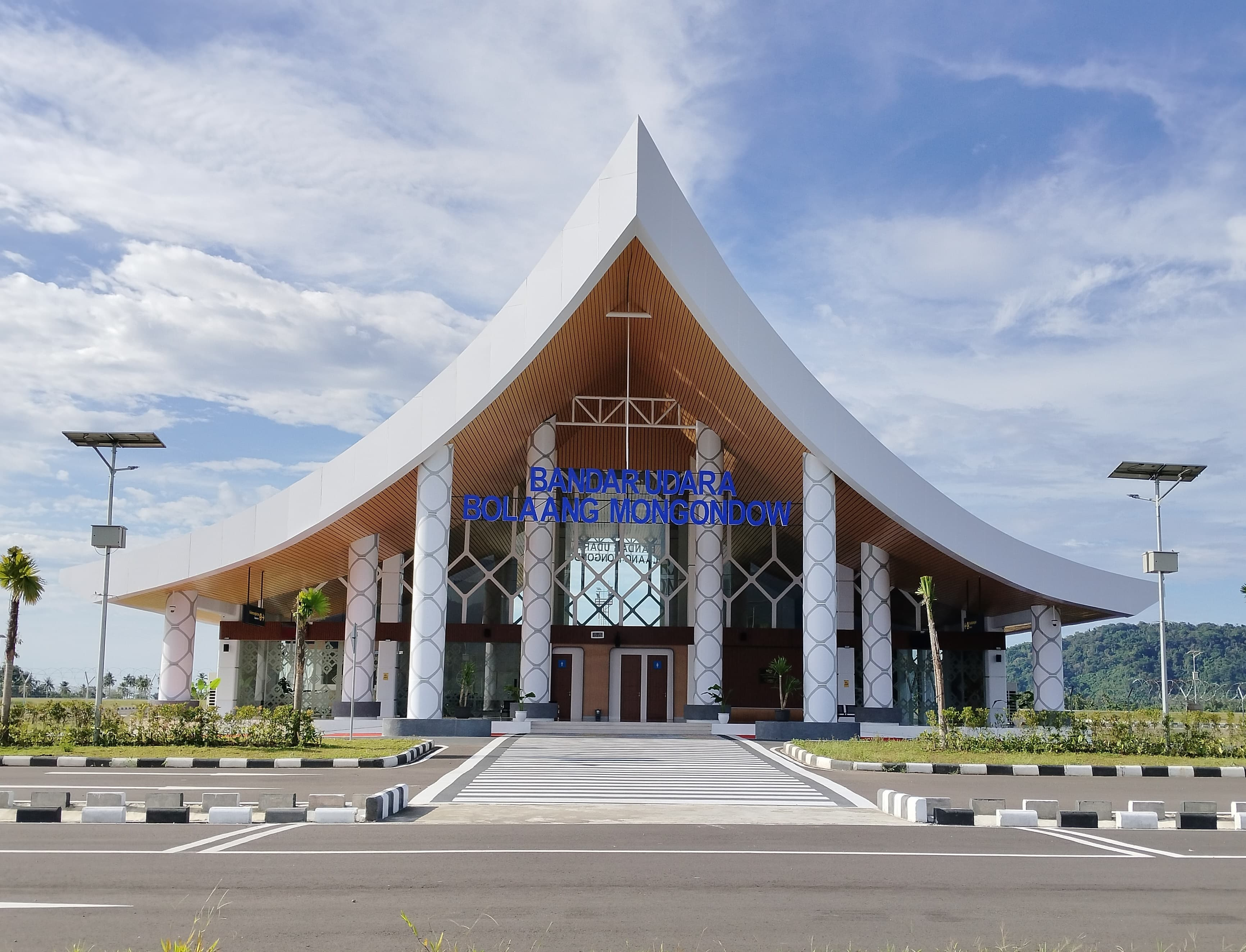
- IATA: LKM; ICAO: WAMI

Summary
- Owner: Directorate General of Civil Aviation (Indonesia)
- Operator: Unit Penyelenggara Bandar Udara Kelas II Bolaaang Mongondow
- Location: Lalow, Lolak, Bolaang Mongondow Regency, North Sulawesi, Indonesia
- Time zone: WITA (UTC+08:00)
- Coordinates: 0°53′19″S 124°1′19″E
- Interactive map of Bolaang Mongondow Airport

Runways
Direction	Length		Surface
Direction	ft	m	Surface
11/29	5,249	1,600	Asphalt
- Source: DGCA

Bolaang Mongondow Airport (Indonesian: Bandar Udara Bolaang Mongondow) (IATA: LKM, ICAO: WAMI) is an airport located in Lolak District, Bolaang Mongondow Regency, North Sulawesi, Indonesia. The airport is also known as Raja Loloda Mokoagow Airport (Indonesian: Bandar Udara Raja Loloda Mokoagow), named after the former king of the Kingdom of Bolaang Mongondow, Loloda Mokoagow. The first plane landed at the airport on 18 February 2024.

== Airlines and destinations ==
Airlines	Destinations
Susi Air	Gorontalo, Manado
