= Tolitoli Regency =

Regency in Central Sulawesi, Indonesia

Tolitoli Regency Kabupaten Tolitoli
- Regency
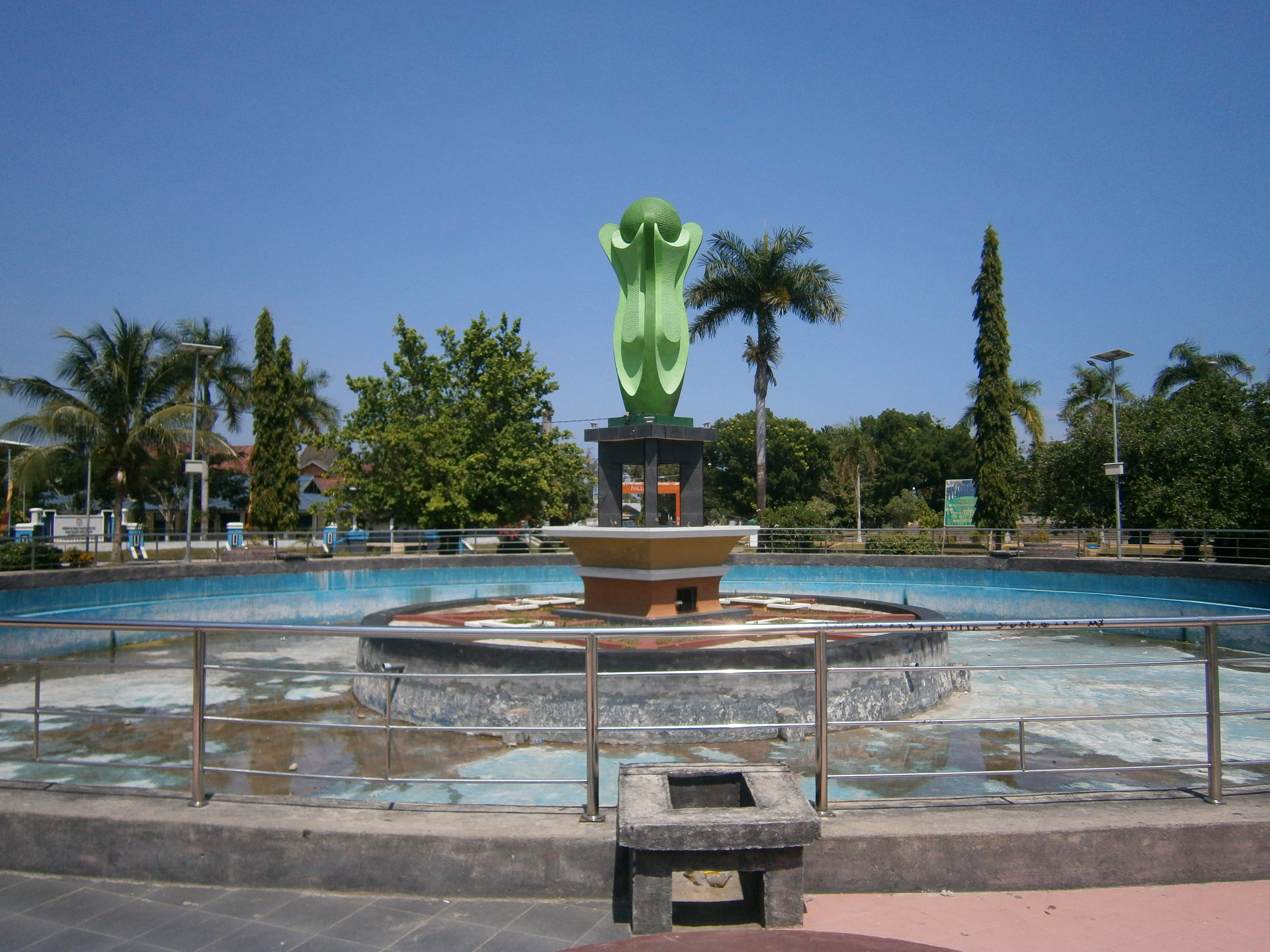
- Clove monument (Tugu Cengkeh) in Tolitoli

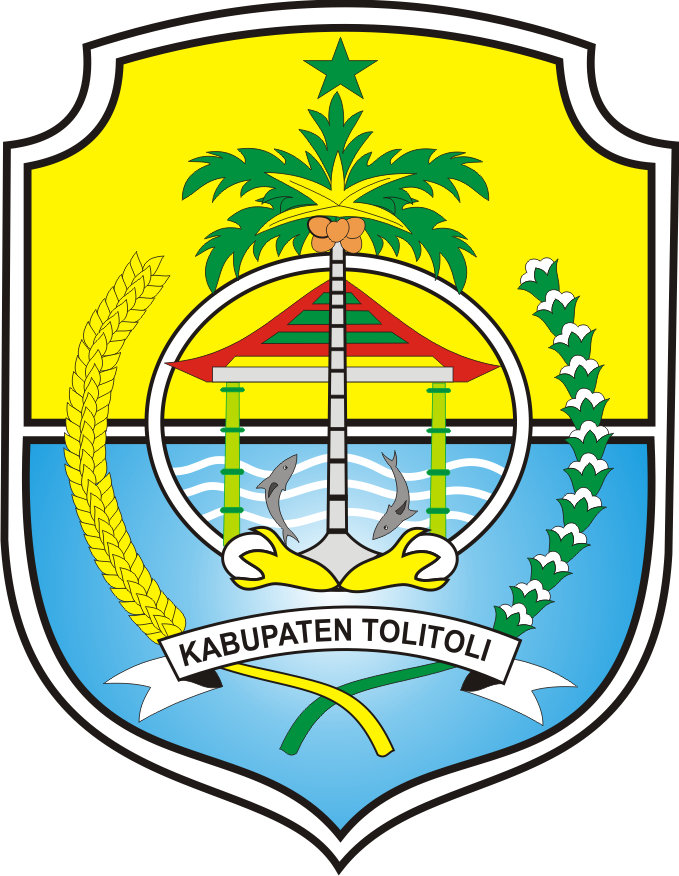
- Coat of arms

- Location within Central Sulawesi

- Location in Sulawesi and Indonesia Tolitoli Regency (Indonesia)
- Coordinates: 1°02′19″N 120°49′04″E
- Country: Indonesia
- Province: Central Sulawesi
- Capital: Tolitoli

Government
  - Regent: Amran Hi. Yahya
  - Vice Regent: Mohammad Besar Bantilan

Area
  - Total: 3,700.37 km^{2} (1,428.72 sq mi)

Population (mid 2025 estimate)
  - Total: 236,021
  - Density: 63.7831/km^{2} (165.197/sq mi)
- Time zone: UTC+8 (ICST)
- Area code: (+62) 453
- Website: tolitolikab.go.id

Tolitoli Regency is a regency of Central Sulawesi Province of Indonesia. It was previously part of a larger Buol Tolitoli Regency (including the current Buol Regency), but this was split into two on 4 October 1999 after rapid decentralization of the Indonesian government. The present Tolitoli Regency covers an area of 3,700.37 km^{2} and had a population of 211,296 at the 2010 Census and 225,154 at the 2020 Census; the official estimate as at mid 2025 was 236,021 (comprising 120,222 males and 115,799 females). Its regency seat is located at the town of Tolitoli (in Baolan District), which is a port town and where the regency's population is concentrated.

== Administrative districts ==
The Tolitoli Regency was divided in 2020 into ten districts (kecamatan), which are tabulated below with their areas and their populations at the 2010 Census and the 2020 Census, together with the official estimates as at mid 2025. The table also includes the location of the district administrative centres, the number of administrative villages in each district (totalling 103 rural desa and 6 urban kelurahan in total), and its post code.

| Kode Wilayah | Name of District (kecamatan) | Area in km^{2} ^{(a)} | Pop'n Census 2010 | Pop'n Census 2020 | Pop'n Estimate mid 2025 | Admin centre | No. of villages | Post code |
|---|---|---|---|---|---|---|---|---|
| 72.04.01 | Dampal Selatan (South Dampal) | 377.95 | 21,394 | 21,617 | 22,050 | Bangkir | 13 | 94554 |
| 72.04.02 | Dampal Utara ^{(a)} (North Dampal) | 169.97 | 14,390 | 13,897 | 14,100 | Ogotua | 12 | 94553 |
| 72.04.03 | Dondo | 418.20 | 21,358 | 22,650 | 23,650 | Tinabogan | 16 | 94551 |
| 72.04.05 | Ogodeide ^{(b)} | 250.26 | 11,682 | 12,270 | 12,750 | Bilo | 11 | 94516 |
| 72.04.04 | Basidondo | 556.52 | 10,458 | 10,748 | 11,050 | Kayulompa | 10 | 94552 |
| 72.04.07 | Baolan | 330.78 | 63,072 | 67,603 | 70,950 | Baru | ^{(c)} 10 | 94511: 94517 |
| 72.04.06 | Lampasio | 556.47 | 11,875 | 12,847 | 13,540 | Sibea | 9 | 94517 & 94518 |
| 72.04.08 | Galang | 419.63 | 31,701 | 35,715 | 38,400 | Lalos | 14 | 94561 |
| 72.04.09 | Tolitoli Utara (North Toli-Toli) | 464.50 | 16,940 | 18,180 | 19,090 | Laulalang | 10 | 94560 |
| 72.04.10 | Dako Pemean | 156.09 | 8,426 | 9,627 | 10,420 | Galumpang | 4 | 94562 |
| | Totals | 3,700.37 | 211,296 | 225,154 | 236,021 | Tolitoli | 109 | |

Notes: (a) including 7 offshore islands, the largest being Pulau Simatang off the north coast of the district.
(b) including 29 offshore islands, the largest being Pulau Kabetan off the northwest coast of the district.
(c) including all six kelurahan (urban villages) in the regency, namely Baru, Nalu, Panasakan, Sidoarjo, Tambun and Tuweley.

== Climate ==
Tolitoli has a tropical rainforest climate (Af) with moderate rainfall in March and April and heavy rainfall in the remaining months.

Climate data for Tolitoli
| Month | Jan | Feb | Mar | Apr | May | Jun | Jul | Aug | Sep | Oct | Nov | Dec | Year |
|---|---|---|---|---|---|---|---|---|---|---|---|---|---|
| Mean daily maximum °C (°F) | 30.5 (86.9) | 30.6 (87.1) | 30.9 (87.6) | 31.2 (88.2) | 31.4 (88.5) | 30.8 (87.4) | 30.4 (86.7) | 31.3 (88.3) | 31.5 (88.7) | 32.2 (90.0) | 31.6 (88.9) | 31.1 (88.0) | 31.1 (88.0) |
| Daily mean °C (°F) | 26.6 (79.9) | 26.7 (80.1) | 26.9 (80.4) | 27.0 (80.6) | 27.4 (81.3) | 26.8 (80.2) | 26.4 (79.5) | 27.0 (80.6) | 26.9 (80.4) | 27.5 (81.5) | 27.2 (81.0) | 27.1 (80.8) | 27.0 (80.5) |
| Mean daily minimum °C (°F) | 22.7 (72.9) | 22.8 (73.0) | 22.9 (73.2) | 22.9 (73.2) | 23.4 (74.1) | 22.9 (73.2) | 22.4 (72.3) | 22.7 (72.9) | 22.4 (72.3) | 22.8 (73.0) | 22.9 (73.2) | 23.1 (73.6) | 22.8 (73.1) |
| Average rainfall mm (inches) | 256 (10.1) | 169 (6.7) | 108 (4.3) | 117 (4.6) | 174 (6.9) | 194 (7.6) | 274 (10.8) | 166 (6.5) | 154 (6.1) | 164 (6.5) | 194 (7.6) | 177 (7.0) | 2,147 (84.7) |
Source: Climate-Data.org
