= Kuabang Airport =

Kuabang Airport Bandar Udara Kuabang
- IATA: KAZ; ICAO: WAEK

Summary
- Airport type: Public
- Owner: Government of Indonesia
- Operator: Indonesian Ministry of Transportation
- Serves: Tobelo
- Location: Kao, Halmahera Utara, North Maluku
- Time zone: WIT (UTC+09:00)
- Elevation AMSL: 13 m / 44 ft
- Coordinates: 1°11′14″N 127°53′45″E
- Website: http://bandara-kao.com/

Map
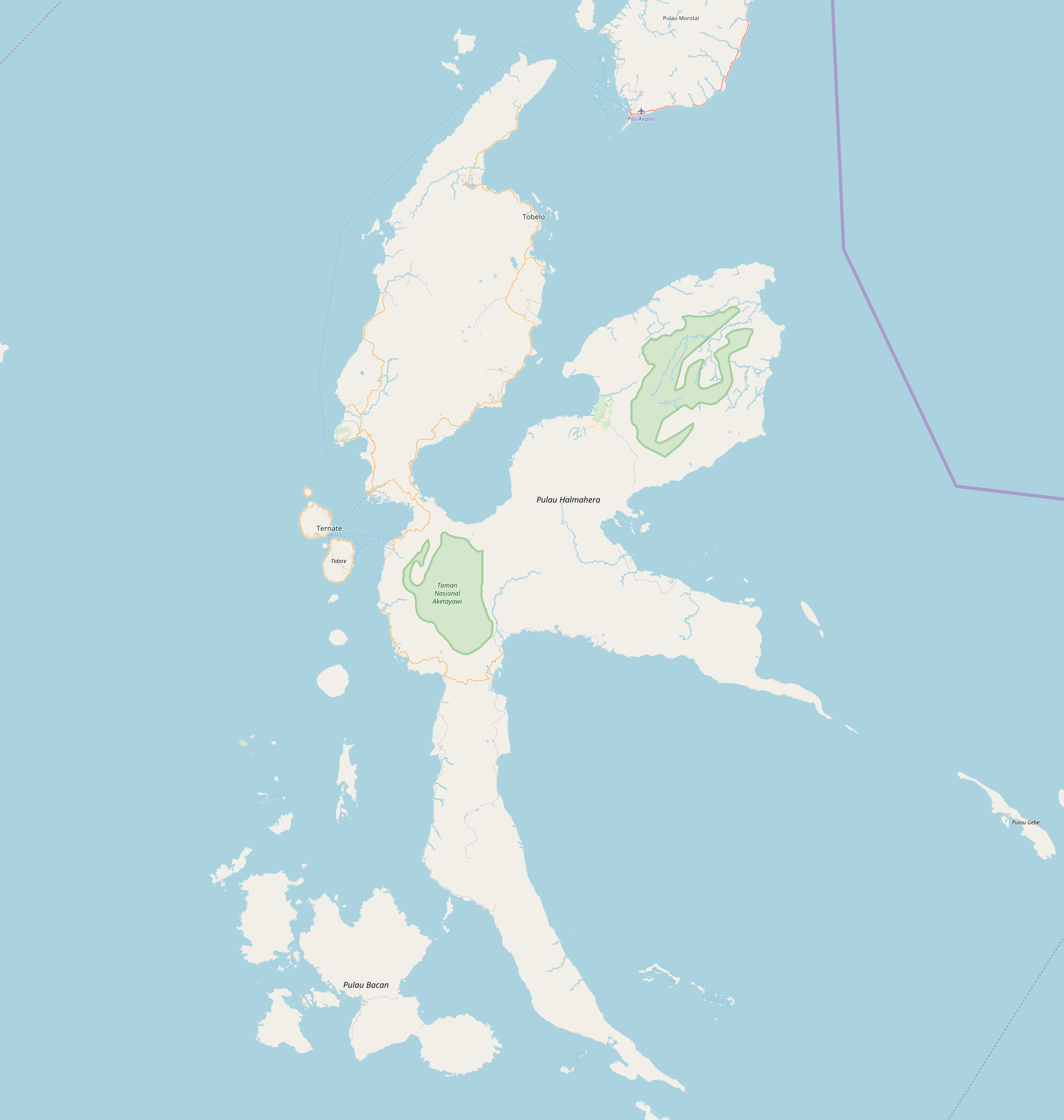
- Location within North Maluku, Indonesia KAZ (Indonesia)

Runways
Direction	Length		Surface
Direction	ft	m	Surface
18/36	6,398	1,950	Asphalt
- Sources: Indonesian Ministry of Transportation

Kuabang Airport (IATA: KAZ, ICAO: WAEK), also known as Kao Airport, is an airport located near Jati village, serving the coastal town of Kao, North Halmahera Regency, North Maluku, Indonesia. The airport has a runway size of 1,950 by 45 metres (6,398 ft × 148 ft), which can accommodate narrow-body aircraft such as the Boeing 737 Classic. The distance from the airport to Tobelo is about 75 kilometres (47 mi) and takes about 2 hours by road. The airport only serves daily domestic flights to Manado operated by Wings Air using the ATR-72 aircraft.

The airport was originally built by the Empire of Japan at the midst of the Pacific War of World War II. After the Japanese surrendered, the airport was neglected for several years before the Indonesian Ministry of Transportation decided to reactivate the airport to improve air connection to the surrounding area. In 1972, a CN-235 successfully landed smoothly on the airport runway, marking the completion of the reactivation of the airport.

== Airlines and destinations ==
=== Passenger ===
Airlines	Destinations
Wings Air	Manado, Ternate
