= Soasiu =

- Town
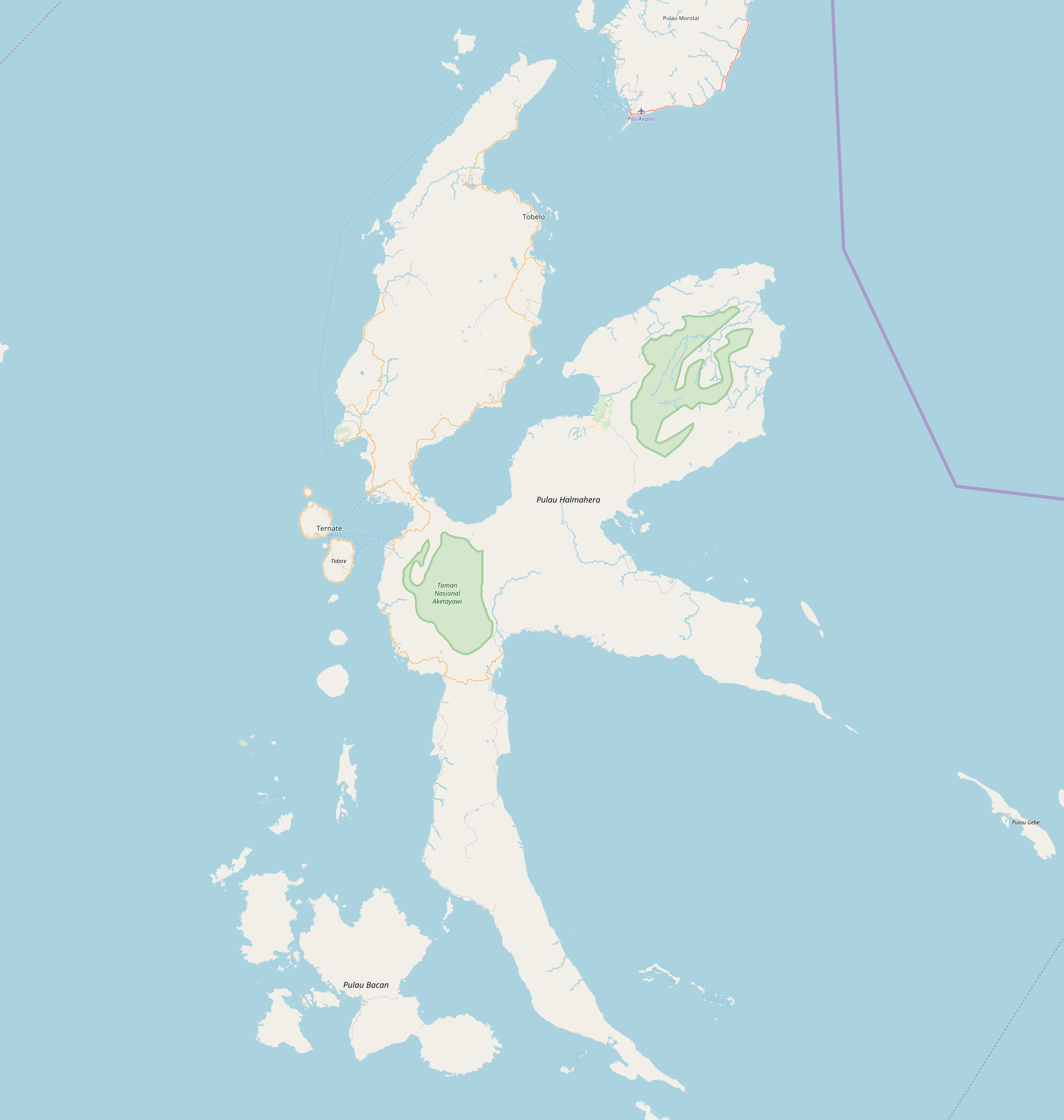
- Location of the town in Halmahera
- Coordinates: 1°42′N 127°36′E
- Country: Indonesia
- Province: North Maluku
- Island: Halmahera
- Regency: North Halmahera
- Time zone: UTC+7 (WIB)

Soasiu is a small coastal town on the eastern Indonesian island of Halmahera. It is located in the North Halmahera Regency, part of the province of North Maluku, and lies on the northwestern coast. A market is held in Soasiu every Tuesday and Friday. The Sonyine Malige Sultan's Museum is located in the outskirts of the town.
