= GLX (disambiguation) =

GLX is a computing interface between OpenGL and X Windows.

GLX may also refer to:

- Gamar Malamo Airport, Indonesia (by IATA code)
- Green Line Extension, a rail project in Massachusetts, United States
