= Sultan Babullah Airport =

Sultan Babullah Airport Bandar Udara Sultan Babullah
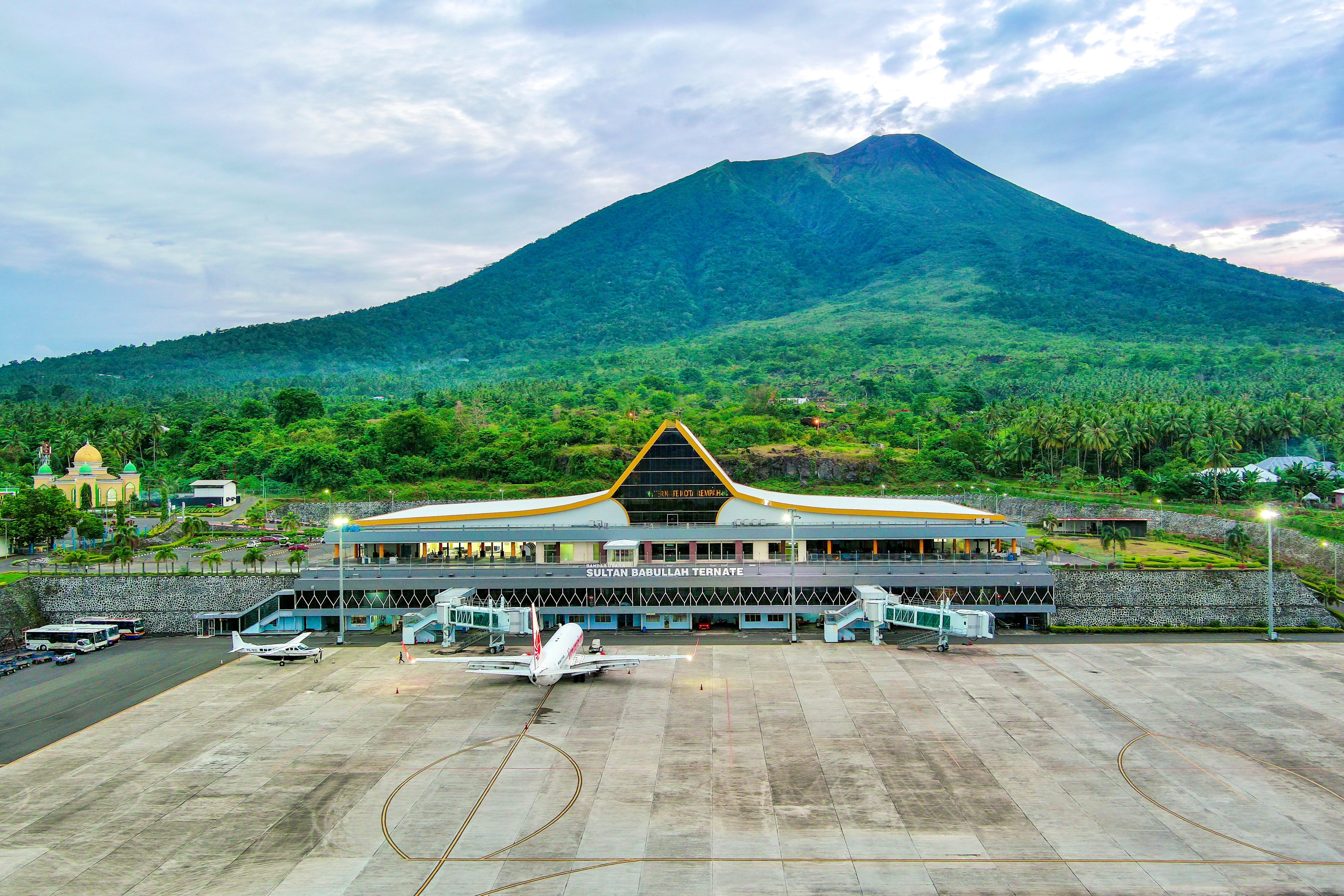
- IATA: TTE; ICAO: WAEE; WMO: 97430

Summary
- Airport type: Public
- Owner: Government of Indonesia
- Operator: Directorate General of Civil Aviation
- Serves: Ternate
- Location: Ternate, North Maluku, Indonesia
- Time zone: WIT (UTC+09:00)
- Elevation AMSL: 49 ft (15 m)
- Coordinates: 0°49′55″N 127°22′50″E

Map
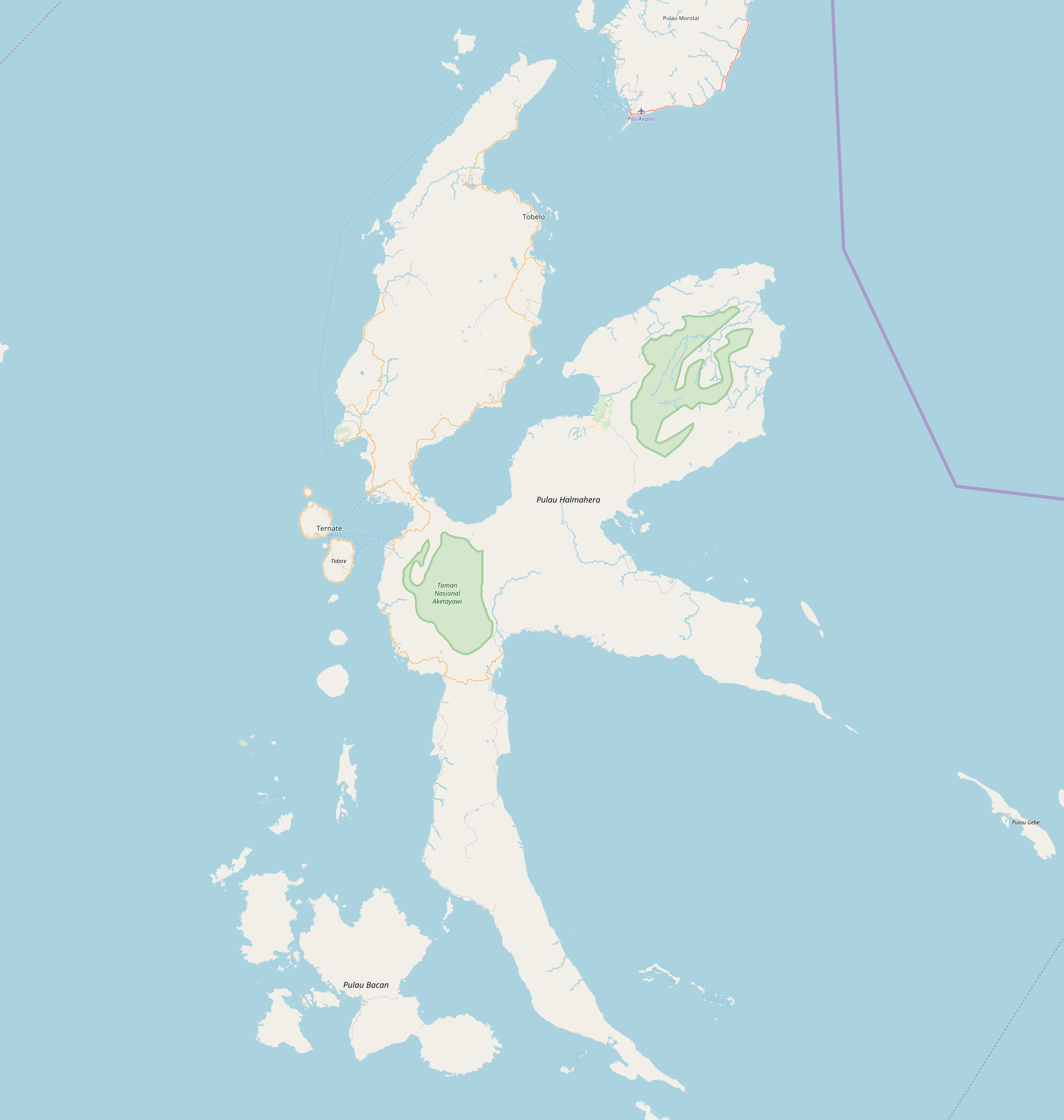
- Location of airport in North Maluku / Indonesia TTE/WAEE (Indonesia)

Runways
Direction	Length		Surface
Direction	m	ft	Surface
02/20	2,300	7,546	Asphalt

Statistics (2024)
- Passengers: 795,549 (▲6.96%)
- Cargo (tonnes): 7,772.96 (▲57.79%)
- Aircraft movements: 9,120 (▼3.61%)
- Source: DGCA

Sultan Babullah Airport (IATA: TTE, ICAO: WAEE) is a domestic airport serving the island city of Ternate, the largest urban center in North Maluku province, Indonesia. The airport is named after Sultan Babullah of Ternate, the seventh ruler of the Sultanate of Ternate, who resisted Portuguese colonization in the Moluccas during the 16th century and is recognized as a national hero of Indonesia. Located approximately 5 km (3 miles) from downtown Ternate, the airport is the largest and busiest in North Maluku and the second-busiest in the Maluku Islands after Pattimura Airport in Ambon. It serves as the main gateway to both the city and the wider North Maluku region. The airport operates flights to major Indonesian cities such as Jakarta, Surabaya, Makassar, and Manado, and also functions as a hub for pioneer routes connecting remote towns and islands across North Maluku that are otherwise accessible only by air.

== History ==
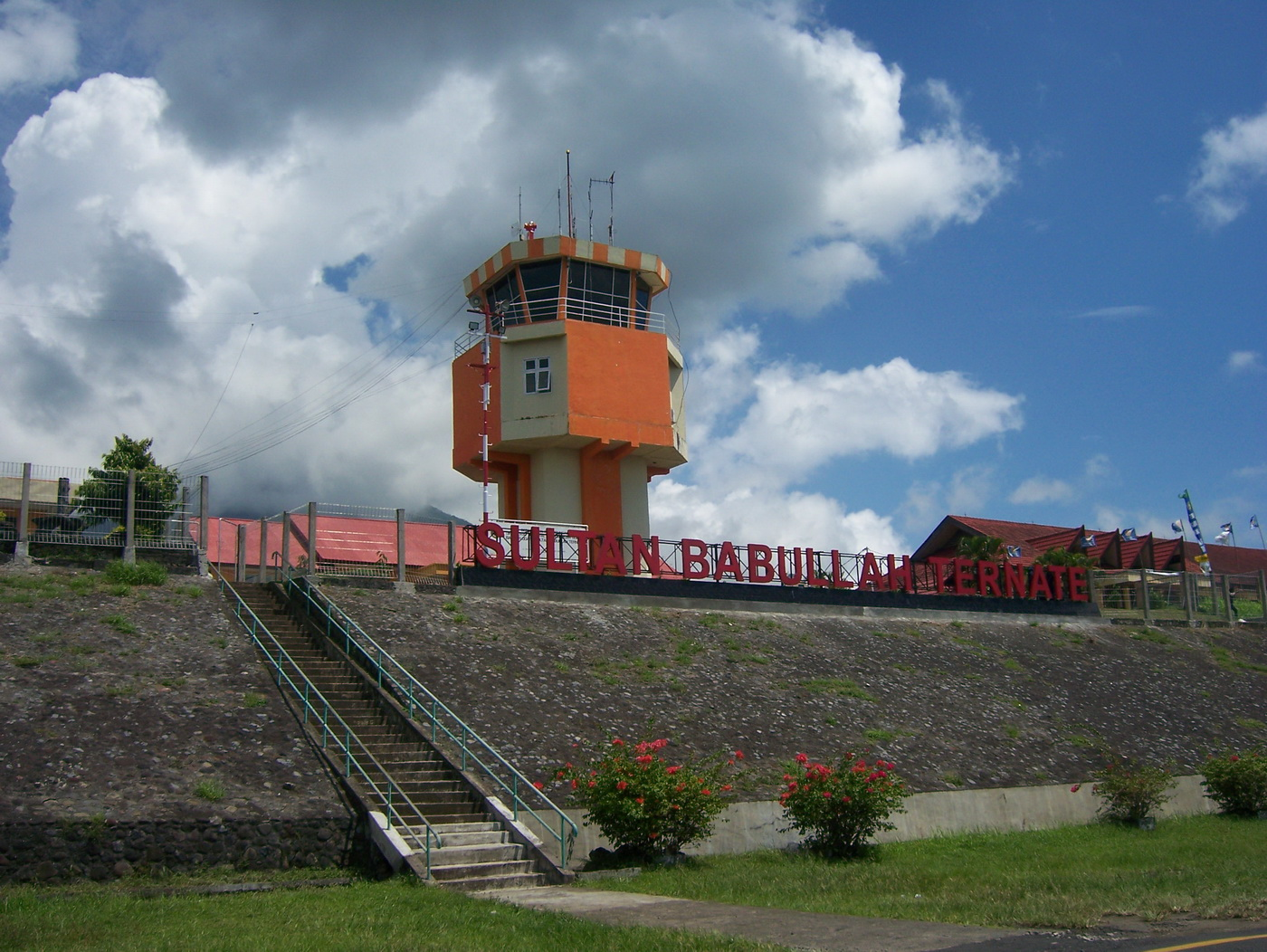
Sultan Babullah Airport in 2006. The former terminal can be seen on the far right

Sultan Babullah Airport was constructed in 1970 and inaugurated in 1971 by then Minister of Transportation, Frans Seda. The airport was built on the site of a former clove plantation and initially featured a runway measuring 1,100 m × 30 m. In the early years of its operation in the 1970s, the airport was still considered a rural airstrip and served only pioneer routes to Ambon and Galela, operated by Merpati Nusantara Airlines using the de Havilland Canada DHC-6 Twin Otter. In 1982, the airport was upgraded to accommodate larger aircraft such as the Fokker F27. By the late 1980s, the airport was already connected to major cities in Eastern Indonesia such as Ambon and Manado, with flights operated by Merpati Nusantara Airlines. Along with Pattimura Airport in Ambon, the airport was designated as one of the two main points of entry to what was then Maluku, prior to the creation of North Maluku province, from other parts of Indonesia.

The airport has been the site of several demonstrations over the years, some of which have disrupted air traffic. On 18 January 2005, hundreds of nearby residents occupied the airport in protest over the government’s failure to pay land compensation related to its development. The occupation ended after a representative of the protesters was flown to Jakarta to meet with officials from the Ministry of Transportation. On 22 August 2007, the airport was again the site of a major demonstration that escalated into riots involving more than 1,000 people, linked to the North Maluku gubernatorial elections. Several police officers and protesters were injured, including four rioters who were shot by police. In addition, due to its proximity to Mount Gamalama, an active volcano, the airport has been temporarily closed several times during eruptions.

In 2008, Batavia Air launched the first direct flight between Jakarta and Ternate using a Boeing 737-300. The service continued until 2013, when the airline ceased operations. The Jakarta–Ternate route was briefly taken over by Express Air, which operated Boeing 737-300 or Boeing 737-500 aircraft, though the service was also short lived. Meanwhile, Garuda Indonesia launched its Jakarta–Ternate route in 2010 using a Boeing 737-300, initially with a stopover in Manado, before later upgrading it to a direct service operated by the Boeing 737-800.

In April 2017, ownership of the airport was transferred from the Ternate city government to the Directorate General of Civil Aviation under the Ministry of Transportation.

To accommodate the anticipated growth of tourism in Ternate and North Maluku, plans are being considered to upgrade the airport to international status, along with the introduction of direct flights to destinations such as Australia and Japan.

== Facilities and development ==
In 2000, the government began developing supporting infrastructure at the airport, including extending the runway to 1,420 × 30 m. Due to increasing air traffic demand, the runway was further extended in 2001 to 1,650 × 30 m, followed by another expansion in 2003 to 1,800 × 30 m, and again in 2005 to 2,000 × 30 m, alongside the construction of a new terminal. The runway was later extended to 2,300 × 45 m in 2014, which remains its current configuration.

Currently, the airport has a single runway measuring 2,300 m × 45 m, allowing it to accommodate narrow-body aircraft such as the Boeing 737 and Airbus A320. The runway is planned to be extended to up to 2,400 meters in the future. The airport is also equipped with two aprons measuring 180 m × 90 m, as well as two taxiways measuring 110 m × 23 m and 95 m × 23 m, respectively. The airport's apron is equipped with eight parking stands and two jet bridges connecting the terminal to the apron. The airport also provides aircraft rescue and firefighting (ARFF) facilities.

Construction of a new terminal began in 2006 to address the overcapacity of the existing terminal amid rising passenger numbers, and was completed in 2013. The project had a total investment of up to Rp 92 billion, funded through the North Maluku provincial budget. The new terminal covers an area of 9,600 m² and has the capacity to accommodate up to 400,000 passengers annually. It was subsequently renovated in 2023 with a budget of Rp 41.2 billion funded by the Ministry of Transportation. The former terminal, which covers an area of 2,100 m², is currently used as a cargo facility. A cold storage facility is planned at the airport to support the growing export activities from Ternate.

== Airlines and destinations ==
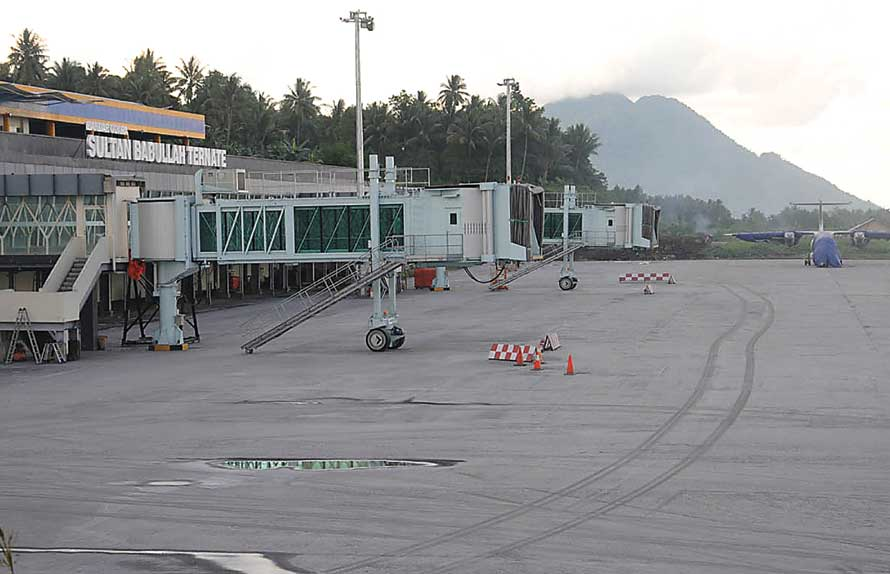
Apron view

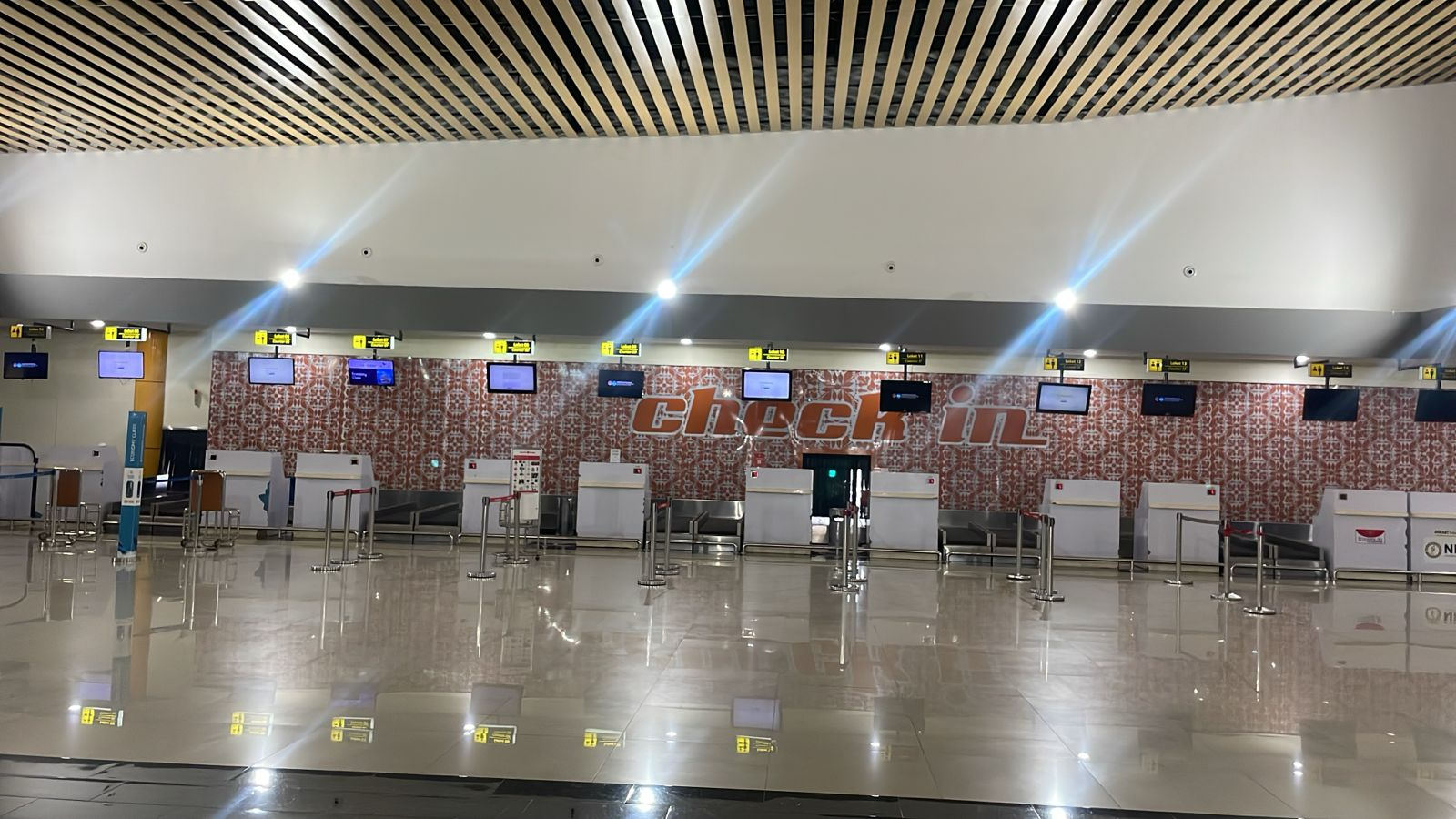
Check-in hall

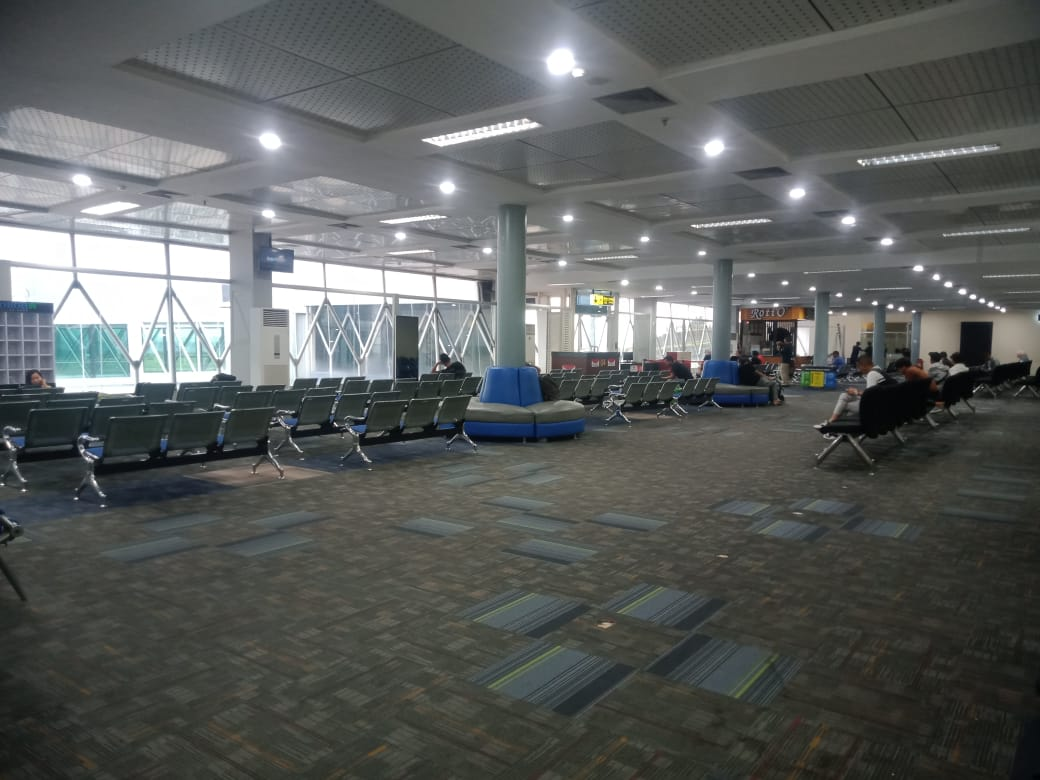
Boarding gate

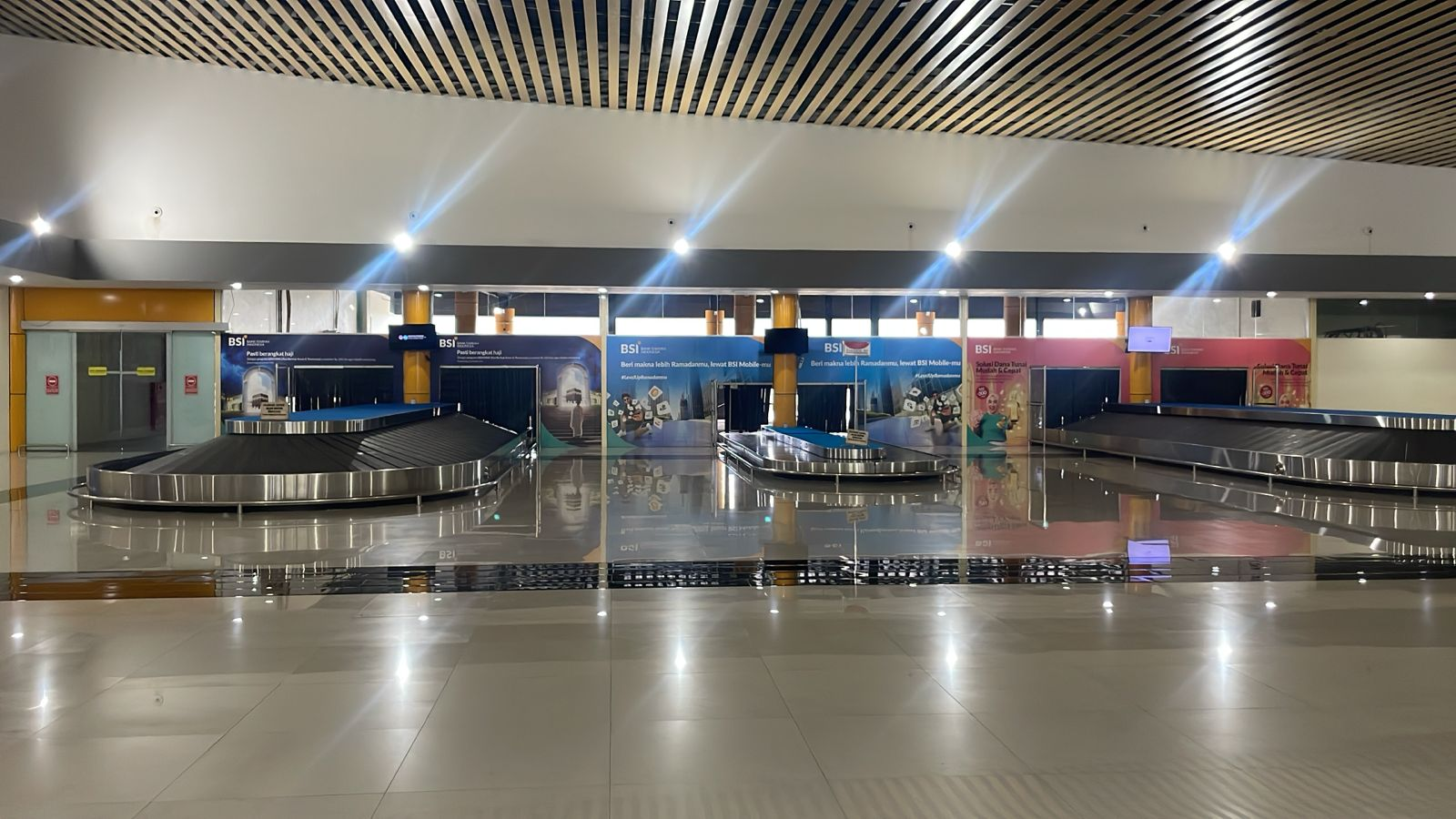
Baggage claim area

=== Passenger ===
Airlines	Destinations
Batik Air	Jakarta–Soekarno-Hatta
Garuda Indonesia	Jakarta–Soekarno-Hatta
Lion Air	Makassar, Surabaya
Sriwijaya Air	Makassar, Manado
Super Air Jet	Jakarta–Soekarno-Hatta
Susi Air	Buli, Galela, Gebe, Mangole, Sanana
TransNusa	Manado
Trigana Air	Sanana
Wings Air	Ambon, Buli, Kao, Labuha, Manado, Morotai

== Statistics ==
Annual passenger numbers and aircraft statistics
Year	Passengers handled	Passenger % change	Cargo (tonnes)	Cargo % change	Aircraft movements	Aircraft % change
2006	202,072	Steady	100.43	Steady	N/A	Steady
2007	214,551	▲6.18	619.30	▲516.65	4,854	Steady
2008	198,080	▼7.68	510.95	▼17.50	4,070	▼16.15
2009	292,054	▲47.44	578.48	▲13.22	6,884	▲69.14
2010	428,884	▲46.85	80.89	▼86.02	8,798	▲27.80
2011	481,685	▲12.31	40.11	▼50.41	9,088	▲3.30
2012	572,531	▲18.86	57.12	▲42.41	11,410	▲25.55
2013	540,988	▼5.51	2,443.53	▲4177.89	10,707	▼6.16
2014	510,340	▼5.67	3,632.40	▲48.65	11,060	▲3.30
2015	605,547	▲18.66	3,315.78	▼8.72	11,456	▲3.58
2016	756,353	▲24.90	2,397.26	▼27.70	11,174	▼2.46
2017	834,190	▲10.29	3,692.79	▲54.04	11,382	▲1.86
2018	912,320	▲9.37	4,158.27	▲12.61	11,458	▲0.67
2019	766,002	▼16.04	3,313.10	▼20.33	9,258	▼19.20
2020	375,311	▼51.00	3,355.62	▲1.28	5,090	▼45.02
2021	373,333	▼0.53	3,867.40	▲15.25	5,536	▲8.76
2022	621,440	▲66.46	4,886.17	▲26.34	8,708	▲57.30
2023	743,802	▲19.69	4,926.17	▲0.82	9,462	▲8.66
2024	795,549	▲6.96	7,772.96	▲57.79	9,120	▼3.61
^{Source: DGCA, BPS}
