= Lake Galela =

Lake in Indonesia

Coordinates: 1°49′0.01″N 127°49′0.01″E

Lake Galela (Indonesian: Danau Galela), also known as Telaga Biru, is a freshwater lake on the island of Halmahera, North Maluku, Indonesia. The city of Galela borders the lake. The lake has clear waters and rich biodiversity, making it both a fishing ground for locals and a tourist attraction.

== Description ==
Lake Galela is the largest freshwater lake on Halmahera. The lake was likely formed over time by various floods, volcanic eruptions, and ash flows. With the exception of a few shallow shores, the lake has a steep coastline surrounding it.

The lake is circled by a traversable road, and as of 2020 31 villages are present on the lake's shores; the main industry on the lake is fishing and tourism, while water from the lake is used in local agriculture. Motorized boat traffic is banned on the lake (canoes and rafts are used instead), resulting in the lake maintaining its clear water. The lake has varying levels of biodiversity, and an environmental impact assessment of the lake showed that human activity has an effect on the local phytoplankton population. One source states that the lake has no shellfish.

According to an April 2020 study, the increasing population of the Galela region threatens the lake's biodiversity.

== See also ==
- List of drainage basins of Indonesia
