= Emalamo Airport =

Emalamo Airport Bandar Udara Emalamo
- IATA: SQN; ICAO: WAES

Summary
- Airport type: Public
- Owner: Government of Indonesia
- Serves: Sanana
- Location: Sanana, Sula Islands Regency, North Maluku, Indonesia
- Time zone: WIT (UTC+09:00)
- Elevation AMSL: 7 ft (2.1 m)
- Coordinates: 2.099716°S 125.965858°E

Map
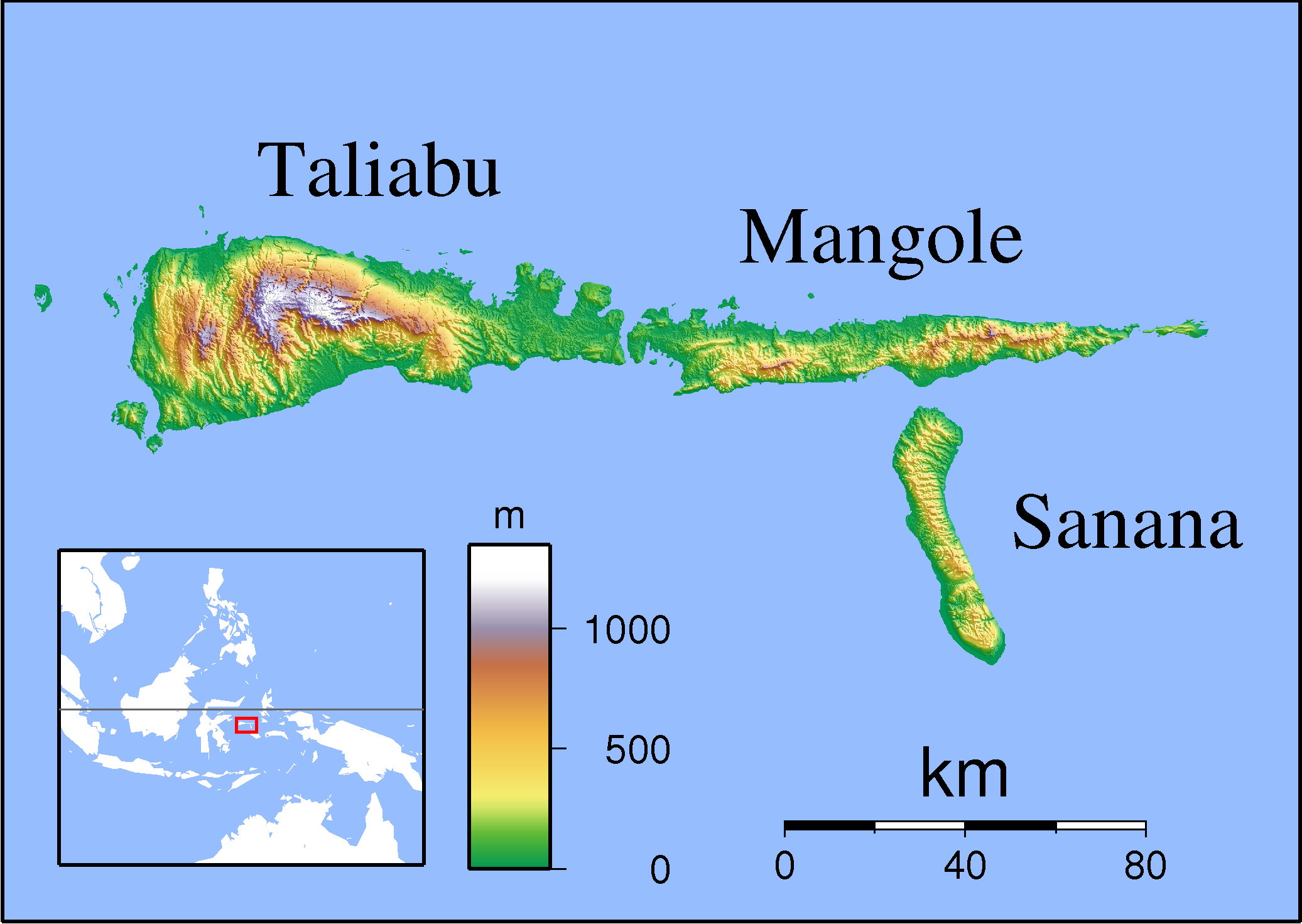
- Location in Sula Islands Location in Maluku Islands Location in Indonesia

Emalamo Airport is located in Sanana, Sula Islands Regency, North Maluku. It has a runway measuring 1,100 x 23 m (3,609 x 75 ft).

== Airlines and destinations ==
Airlines	Destinations
Trigana Air Service	Ambon, Ternate
