= Gamar Malamo Airport =

Gamar Malamo Airport Bandar Udara Gamar Malamo
- IATA: GLX; ICAO: WAEG

Summary
- Airport type: Public
- Owner: Government of Indonesia
- Operator: UPT Ditjen Hubud
- Serves: Galela
- Location: Unnamed Road, Duma, Galela Bar, Kabupaten Halmahera Utara, Maluku Utara, Indonesia
- Time zone: WIT (UTC+09:00)
- Coordinates: 001°50′14″N 127°47′08″E

Map
- Location in Indonesia

Runways
Direction	Length		Surface
Direction	m	ft	Surface
04/22	1,400	4,593	Asphalt

Gamar Malamo Airport (Indonesian: Bandar Udara Gamar Malamo) (IATA: GLX, ICAO: WAEG) is a domestic airport serving the Galela area in North Halmahera Regency, North Maluku, Indonesia. It is operated by the Technical Implementation Unit of the Directorate General of Civil Aviation. The airport is located in Dukolamo village, West Galela District, approximately 6 km (3.7 mi) from Galela and about 25 km (16 mi) from Tobelo, the capital of North Halmahera Regency.

== History ==
Gamar Malamo Airport was constructed during the Five-Year Development Plans (Repelita I) period as one of several pioneer airports built in Maluku to improve accessibility in remote areas.

The airport initially had a runway measuring 750 x 23 metres. By 2018, the runway had been extended to 1,400 x 30 metres, while the apron remained 40 x 60 metres.

Historically, the airport was served by Merpati Nusantara Airlines on the Ternate–Galela route using DHC-6 Twin Otter aircraft with three flights per week.

In 2025, airport authorities stated that regular Galela–Manado and pioneer Galela–Ternate services were not operating. The airport nevertheless remained open and available for aircraft operations.

== Terminals and facilities ==
The airport has one terminal for passengers departing from or arriving into the airport.
