= Kao, Indonesia =

Kao
- Town
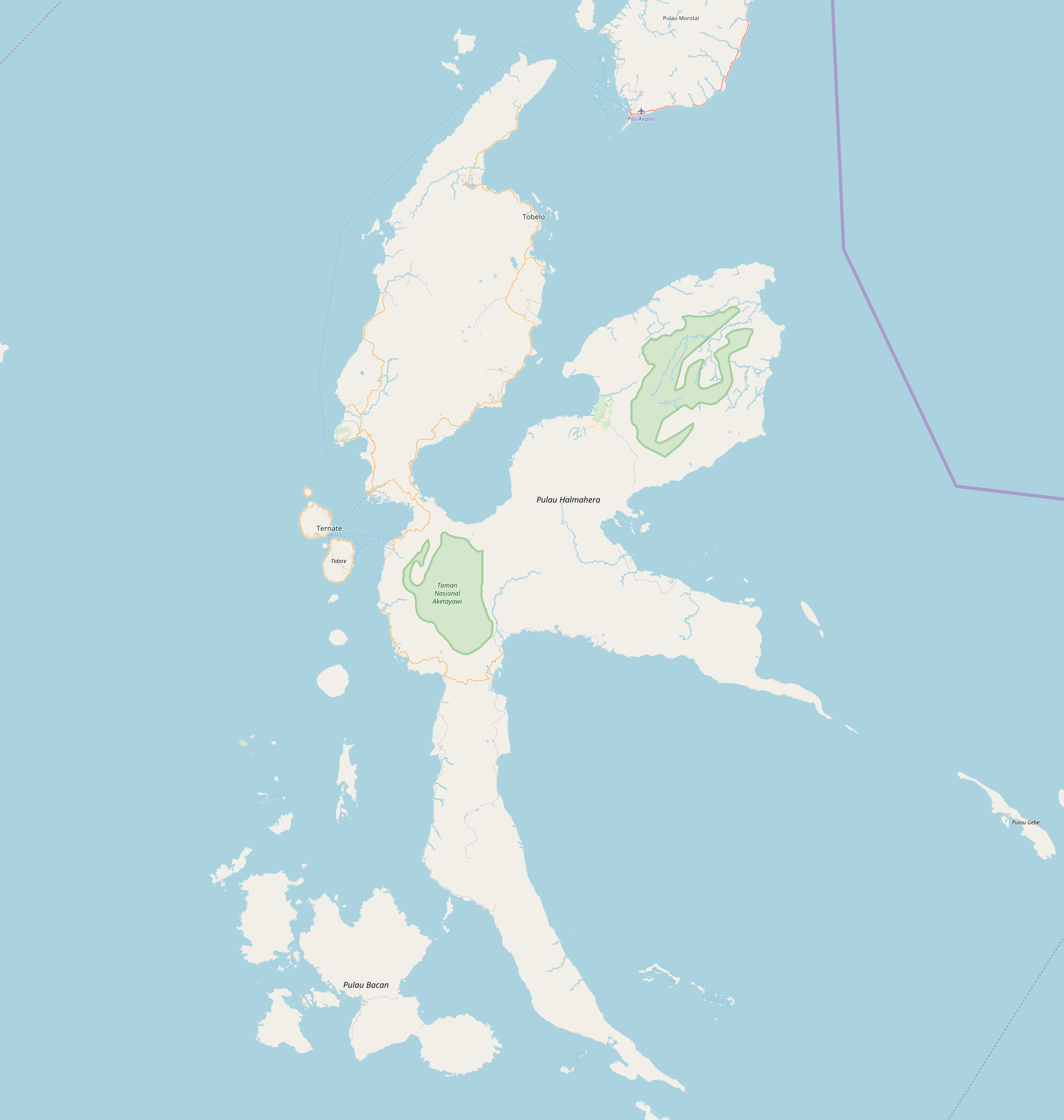
- Location of the town in Halmahera
- Coordinates: 1°10′22″N 127°53′55″E
- Country: Indonesia
- Province: North Maluku
- Island: Halmahera
- Regency: North Halmahera
- Time zone: UTC+9 (WIT)

Kao is a small coastal town on the eastern Indonesian island of Halmahera. It is located in the North Halmahera Regency, part of the province of North Maluku. It is connected by a coastal road to Tobelo, about an hour's drive to the north. Kao cemetery is located to the northwest of the town. During World War II, a Japanese military base was located at Kao Bay.
