= Galela (city) =

- Town
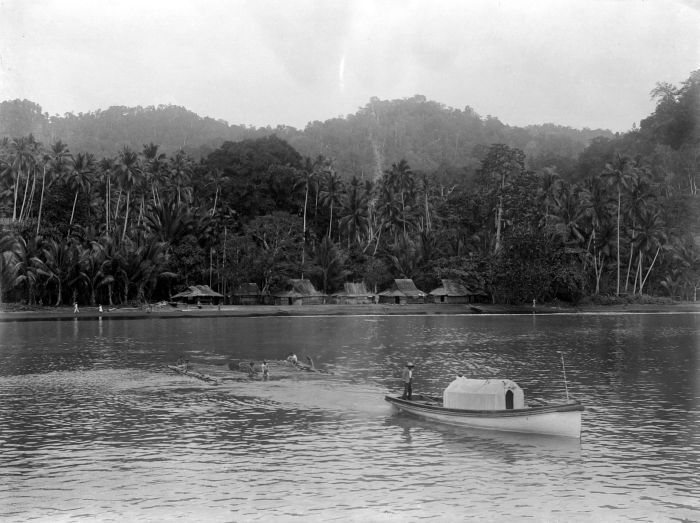

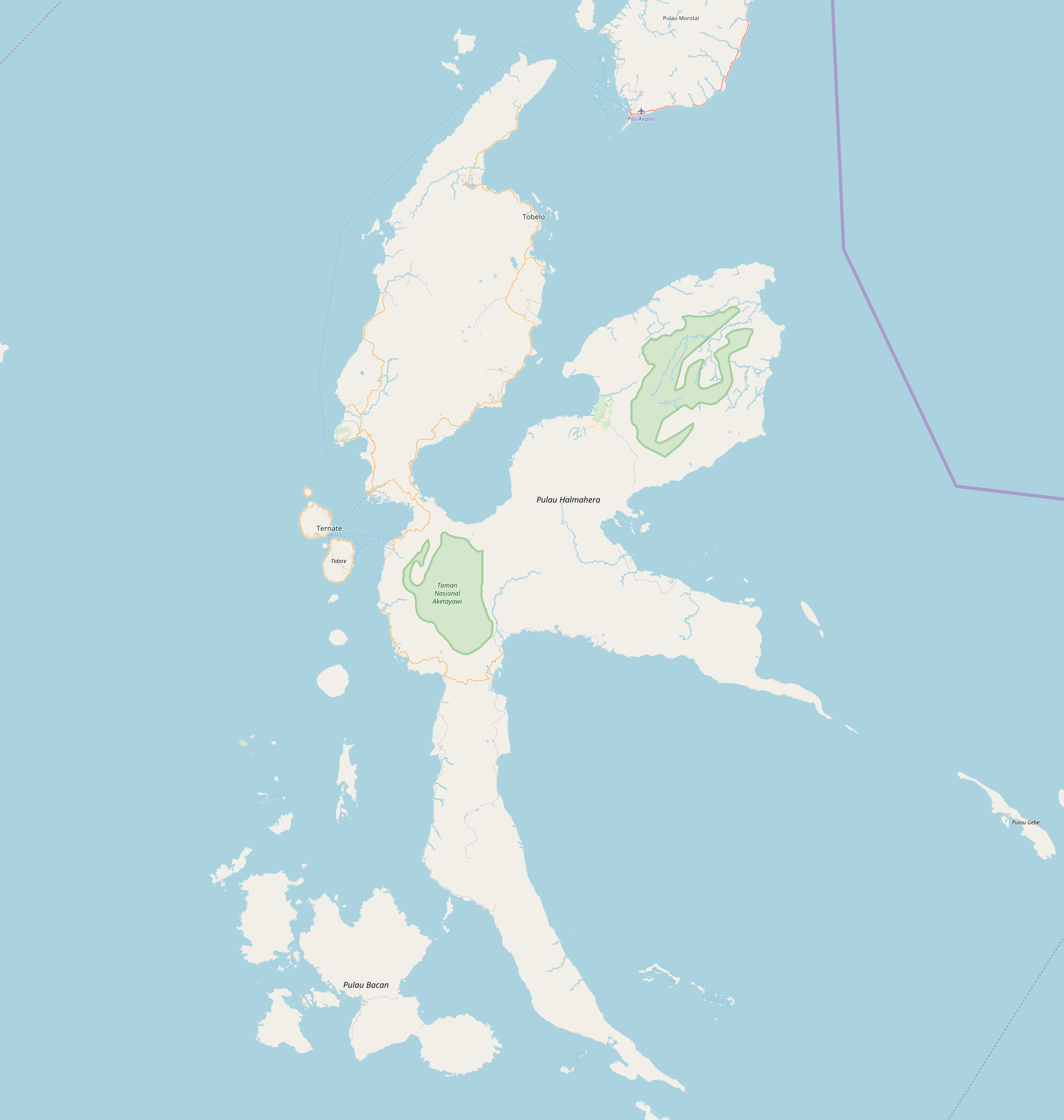
- Location within Halmahera Location within North Maluku Location within Indonesia
- Coordinates: 1°49′25″N 127°50′35″E
- Country: Indonesia
- Province: North Maluku
- Island: Halmahera
- Regency: North Halmahera

Area
  - Total: 95.47 km^{2} (36.86 sq mi)

Population
  - Total: 1,628 (town)
  - Density: 17.05/km^{2} (44.17/sq mi)
- Time zone: UTC+9 (WIB)

Galela (or actually Soa Sio, as it is called properly, with the name Galela referring to the entire district/kecamatan surrounding it), is a small town on the eastern Indonesian island of Halmahera. It is located in the North Halmahera Regency, part of the province of North Maluku. Views of Mount Tarakani can be seen from the scenic coast. Galelarese constitutes an official ethnic group in North Halmhera and is also a language, spoken in the Galela region (composed of 4 administrative districts or kecamatan), neighboring parts of the Tobelo and Loloda regions, on the island of Morotai and in villages scattered in southern Halmahera as well as on Bacan and Obi. The town, which borders Lake Galela, had 1,628 inhabitants in mid 2023, while the entire district had 8,931 inhabitants in mid 2024.

It is served by Gamar Malamo Airport (IATA: GLX). During 2015 Susi Air flies from Ternate every Thursday morning.

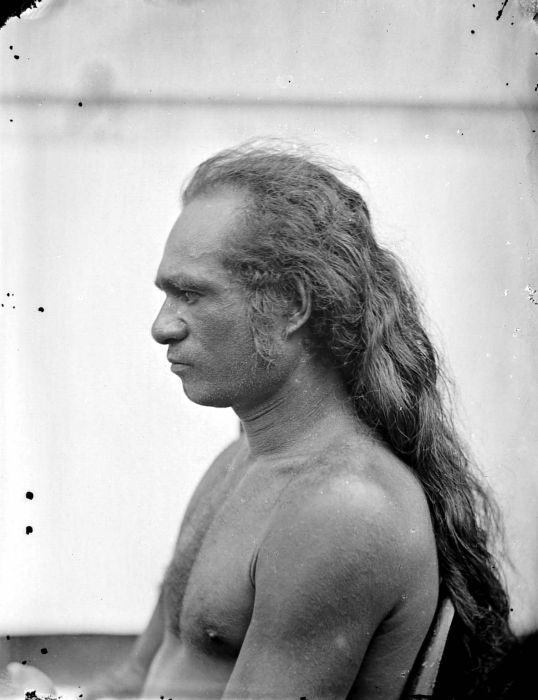

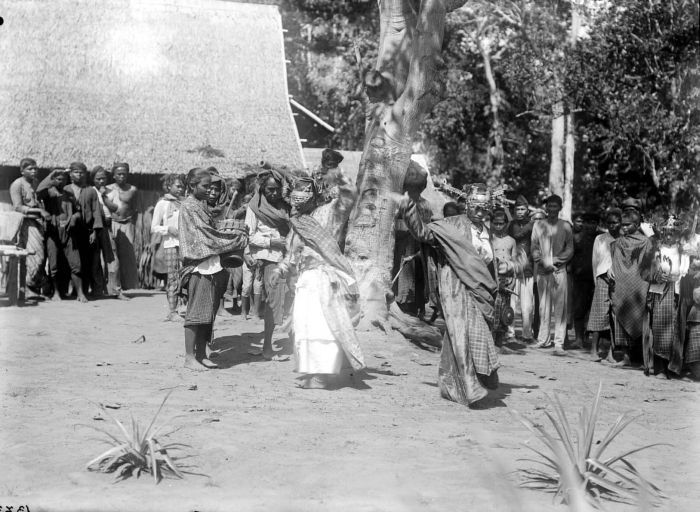

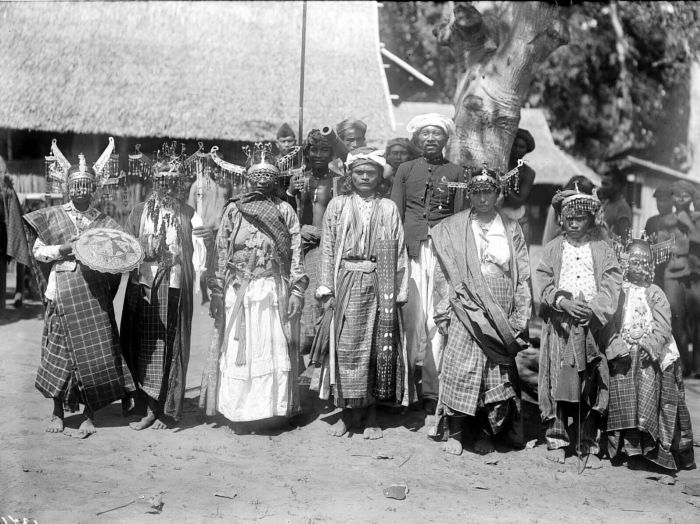

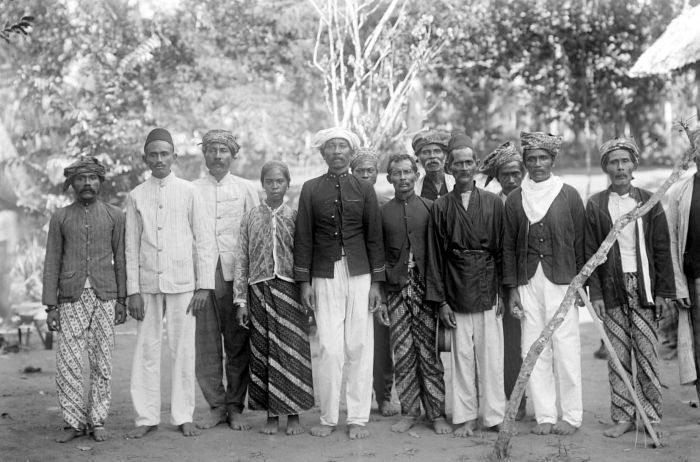

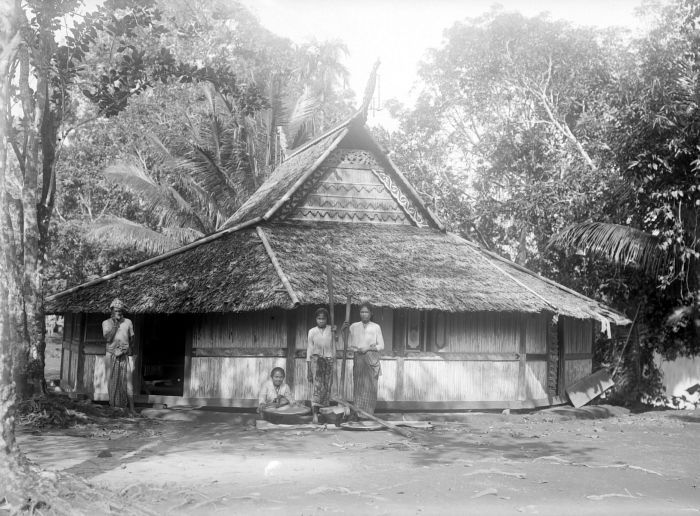

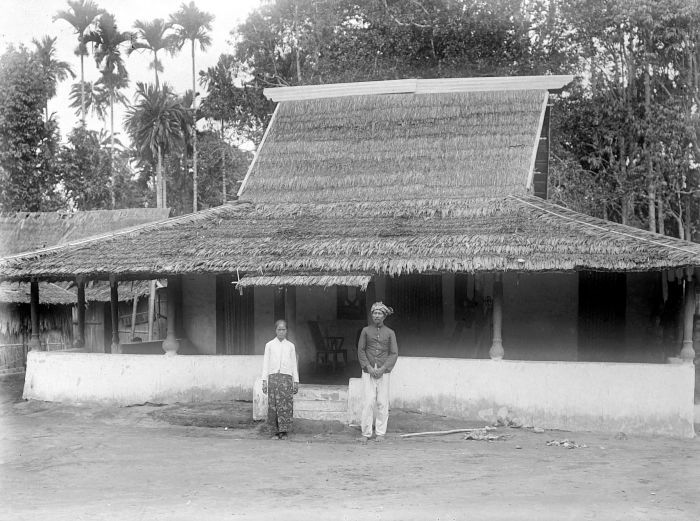

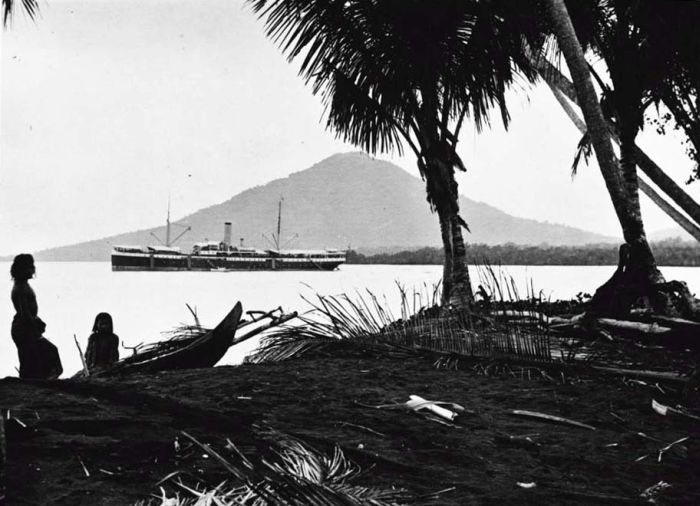

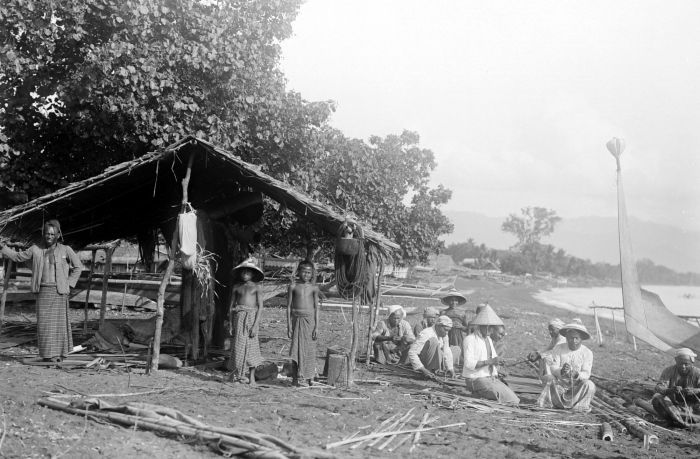

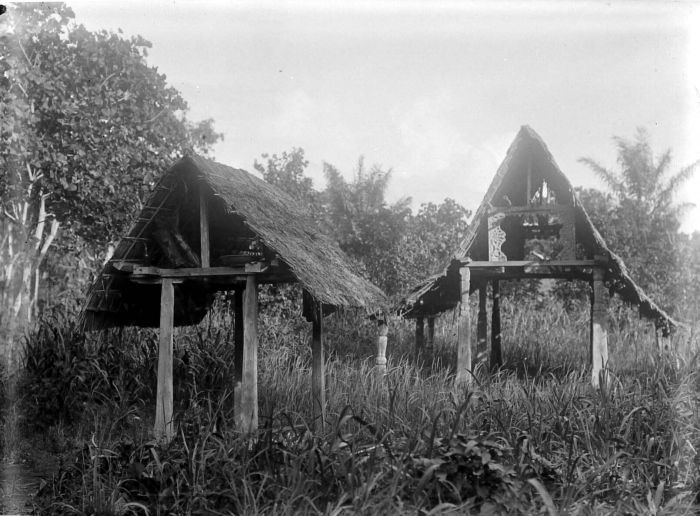
