= Tobelo =

- Town
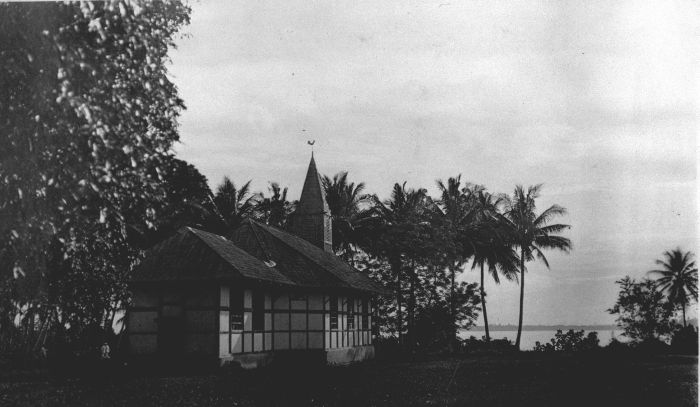
- Protestant Church in Tobelo, dated 1924.

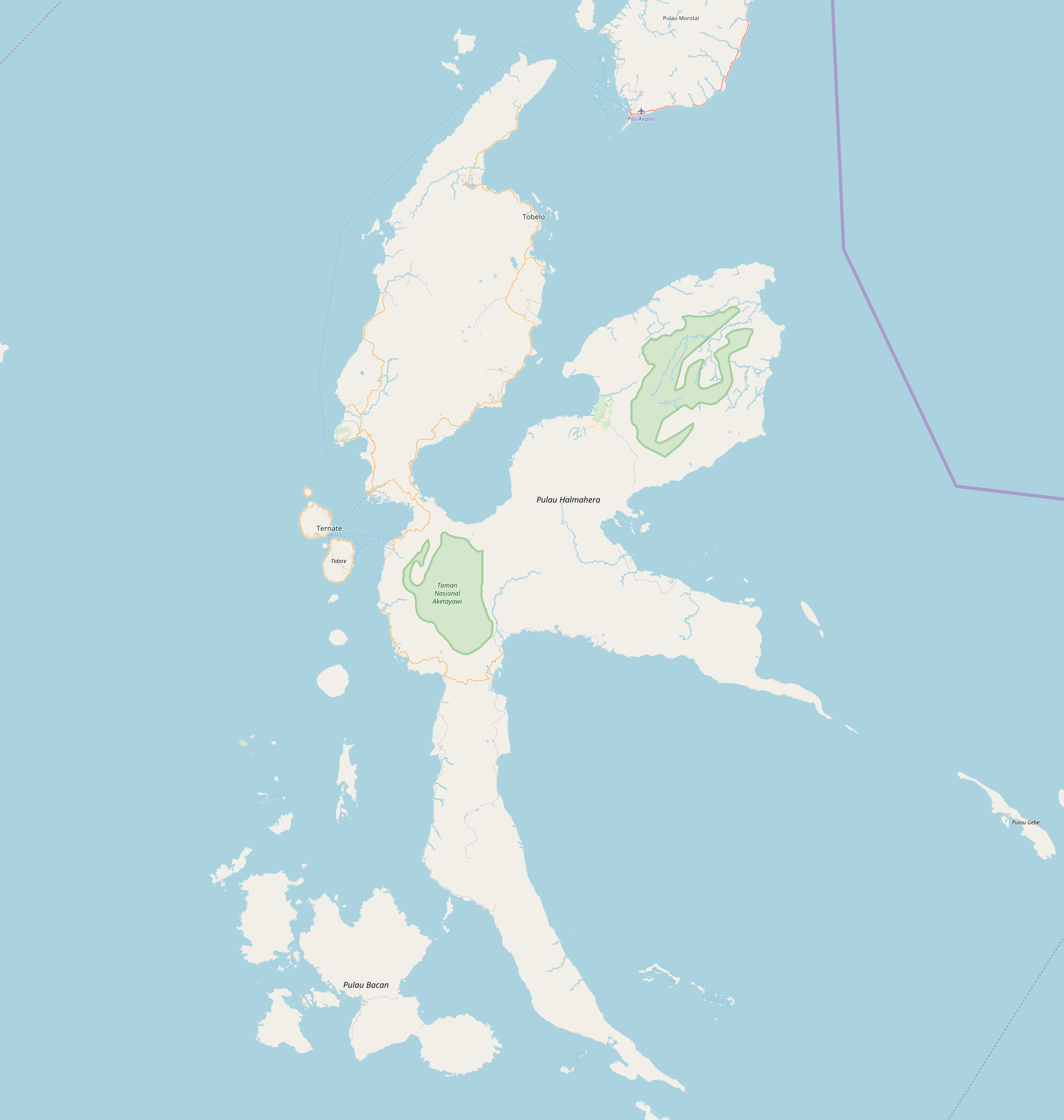
- Location of the town in Halmahera
- Coordinates: 1°43′55″N 128°0′28″E
- Country: Indonesia
- Province: North Maluku
- Island: Halmahera
- Regency: North Halmahera

Area
  - Total: 53.14 km^{2} (20.52 sq mi)

Population (2020 Census)
  - Total: 34,150
  - Density: 642.6/km^{2} (1,664/sq mi)
- Time zone: UTC+9 (WIT)

Tobelo is a town and a district on the eastern Indonesian island of Halmahera. It is the capital of the regency (kabupaten) of North Halmahera, part of the province of North Maluku. The town was formalised as the capital of North Halmahera in the district elections held in 2004. It had a population of 34,150 at the 2020 Census. A palm tree lined coastal road connects Tobelo to Galela. The town is predominantly Christian with a large Muslim minority and a Protestant Church has existed in Tobelo since at least 1924.

== Religion ==
Muslims and Christians had lived amicably in this town of North Halmahera since the 16th century. However, the province of North Maluku has a Muslim majority. The coastal road from Galela to Tobelo passes through neighboring Muslim and Christian villages. Living peacefully, these two communities followed the local cultural tradition of the Hibua Lamo (a pact between Muslims and Christians to live together without aggressive designs on each other and cooperating on all matters of mutual interest).

=== Communal violence ===
Violence broke out in Tobelo in December 1999. According to Duncan (2001), the roots of the conflict "focused on plans by the regional government to create a new district (kecamatan) of Makian Daratan from the southern half of the Kao District." Initial reconciliation efforts at the district level worked for some time in preventing any clashes and assuage hurt feelings. The religious violence, which simmered in January 1999 in Ambon culminated in rioting in Tobelo by end of December 1999. This rioting was further triggered by the fleeing of several thousand Christians from Central Halmahera, and Tobelo had turned into a refugee camp. Though the rioting has been quelled, the mistrust between the two communities prevails. The Galela Districts with their own language are another area where remnants of strife (burnt out churches and mosques) between the religious groups are still seen with military checkposts established to prevent any further disturbances in the region. In the ultimate analysis, it is reported that the sectarian violence in 1999–2000 had resulted in 2000 deaths in Maluku and a population displacement of 200,000 people in the region. Tobelo was one of the worst affected areas. On the one hand, 100,000 Muslims from Tobelo and villages to its south fled to the islands of Ternate and Morotai during early 2000. Nearly 70% of them returned subsequently as the situation was controlled. On the other hand, the region of Tobelo received 45,000 displaced Christians from other parts of Halmahera. However, as a result of violence in 1999–2000, the area is clearly demarcated into Muslim and Christian villages. Tobelo is now almost entirely Christian; while Muslims have fled to nearby villages. Remnants of devastation are still evident. There is a discerned process of peace building emerging between the two communities now.

== Culture ==
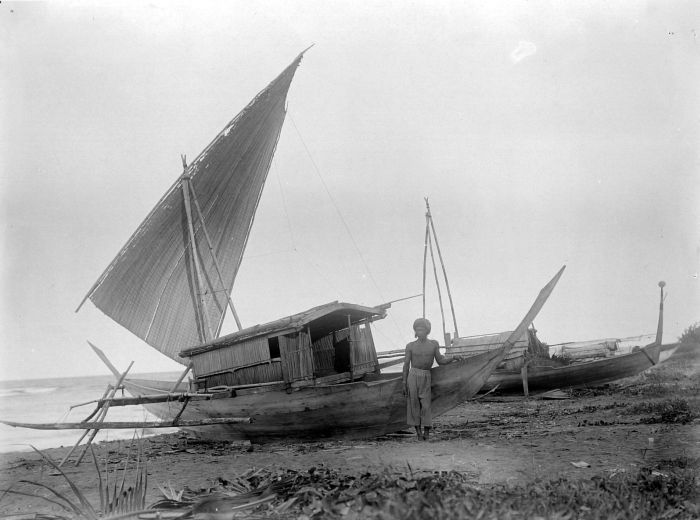
A vessel on the shore of Tobelo

Inhabitants of Tobelo are non-Austronesian–speaking people. Tobelo's predominant Christian character is expressed colourfully at Christmas with bamboo poles arching over the side of the roads hung with lights and multi-coloured flags. At Easter, local church congregations hold a competition to see who can create the best Easter garden.

During the annual North Halmahera Cultural Festival the Tobelorese wear full traditional ceremonial dress.

Traditional Tobelorese weddings are also said to be among the most colourful and the Christians follow traditions during their wedding ceremonies, with traditional music and dance. A wedding is typically accompanied by traditional Tobelorese music, played with gongs and drums and a Cakalele dance is usually performed in front of the bride as she approaches the groom. Around the time of New Year, Tobelo attracts a number of Yangere groups from all over North Halmahera and perform music and dances.

The main language of Tobelo, the Tobelo language, is spoken across parts of North Halmahera and Central Halmahera, by approximately 28,000 people as at 2000.

=== Rituals ===
Each year, in April, after the harvest season there is a practice of offering of plates of rice and certain items of basketry by the married women to the Church, duly observing conventional social norms. The offerings are then sold or auctioned during the Sunday services in the premises of the church. The returns from such sales go to the Church funds (kas gereja), which are used by the church for providing public services. It is more of ritual than an economic transaction.

The other ritual observed in Tobelo is on the first Sunday of January when prayers are offered in the Church for the dead. On this occasion, each family decorates the graves of its deceased with flowers. This is also an occasion when women dressed in military uniform hold a parade through the village and enter houses demanding food and sweets.

The rituals observed conform to both pre-Christian Tobelo customs and the post-Christian era culture conforming to the Gregorian calendar. However, marriages are conducted under the Tobelo customs, rituals and practices. The family units are patrilineal.

== Economy ==
Tobelo boasts large swathes of locally owned coconut plantations, supplying hundreds of tonnes of copra (dried coconut flesh) every month to the ports of Bitung (North Sulawesi) and Surabaya (East Java). The city, as the main centre for the North Halmahera has thus become the export hub for copra and other commodities.

Pulau Tulang is the nearest islet to the town, within swimming distance of the harbour. The Kupa-Kupa beach is located about 10 kilometres (6.2 mi) from the town, near the oil terminal for the Pertamina company. The beach is very clean and attracts tourists for snorkelling. Off the coast of Tobelo town is a group of small, coconut palm covered islands with golden sandy beaches. Longboats frequently travel from them to Tobelo town. Tobelo contains a hospital and a post office and is an important base and port on the island.

=== Post riots economic recovery ===
In the three provinces of North Maluku, Maluku, and Central Sulawesi, the sectarian conflict in 1999 (which centred on Tobelo) devastated the well-being and economy of the people. This needed urgent attention of the authorities concerned in the government through a development process. It was a challenging task to both national and regional governments. The UN Common County Assessment (UNCCA) and Development Assistance Framework (UNDAF) for 2002–2005 and UNDP's Country Cooperation Framework decided to pitch in with assistance. They established a programme of linking relief and longer-term development as part of the UN's support to Indonesia. The UNDP Crisis Prevention and Recovery Unit (CPRU), then launched three support programmes in North Maluku, Maluku and Central Sulawesi, which covered the Galela – Tobelo – South Tobelo Area. Three programmes were launched for the period 2002–2005 envisaging an investment of US$19 million with the objective of:

providing effective law enforcement, the rule of law and security; improve good governance in regional governments, local legislative bodies (DPRD), and the justice sector; improve policy formulation through increased participation of the public and ensure its implementation; resolve IDPs situations within a framework of building community resilience and social cohesion; and Develop the local economy and reduce unemployment through cross-community economic enterprises, skills training, start-up capital, and business opportunities.

UNDP launched development project under the Galela – Tobelo – South Tobelo Area Recovery projects in 2002–2003, involved several projects for rural electrification, health facilities (capacity building), transportation, labour-intensive projects of roads and drainage, social activities of cross community collaboration projects of culture and sports empowerment, construction of bridges, markets, improvement of drainage systems and bus terminals. Economy is picking up and there are clear signs of recovery. However, education facilities are still at the basic level. Tobelo and its neighbourhood are still considered a danger zone for foreigners.

== Climate ==
Tobelo has a tropical rainforest climate (Af) with heavy rainfall year-round.

Climate data for Tobelo
Month	Jan	Feb	Mar	Apr	May	Jun	Jul	Aug	Sep	Oct	Nov	Dec	Year
Mean daily maximum °C (°F)	29.8 (85.6)	29.9 (85.8)	29.7 (85.5)	30.9 (87.6)	30.5 (86.9)	30.2 (86.4)	29.7 (85.5)	30.6 (87.1)	30.8 (87.4)	31.2 (88.2)	31.2 (88.2)	30.2 (86.4)	30.4 (86.7)
Daily mean °C (°F)	26.2 (79.2)	26.3 (79.3)	26.0 (78.8)	27.0 (80.6)	26.8 (80.2)	26.5 (79.7)	26.0 (78.8)	26.8 (80.2)	26.7 (80.1)	27.0 (80.6)	27.2 (81.0)	26.5 (79.7)	26.6 (79.9)
Mean daily minimum °C (°F)	22.6 (72.7)	22.7 (72.9)	22.4 (72.3)	23.1 (73.6)	23.1 (73.6)	22.9 (73.2)	22.4 (72.3)	23.0 (73.4)	22.7 (72.9)	22.9 (73.2)	23.3 (73.9)	22.9 (73.2)	22.8 (73.1)
Average rainfall mm (inches)	178 (7.0)	167 (6.6)	181 (7.1)	222 (8.7)	252 (9.9)	232 (9.1)	172 (6.8)	173 (6.8)	131 (5.2)	119 (4.7)	152 (6.0)	148 (5.8)	2,127 (83.7)
Source: Climate-Data.org

== Attractions ==
Tobelo town has many attractions on the islands in its vicinity. One such island is the Tagalaya where sea is calm and the water is clear. The beaches are clean and have extensive spread of white sand. The major attraction here is the broad spread of coral reefs, which are rich in marine life at a depth of 2–10 metres (6.6–32.8 ft). The locale is also good for swimming and diving.

Other attractions in Tabelo neighbourhood are the many beaches, lakes, off-shore islands, forested hills and a volcano. Some of the well-known places are:

Luari beach

Luari beach, the ethnic Galelarese village of Luari to the north of Tobelo, is on the Pacific Ocean. It has clear and calm waters and is safe for swimming and canoeing. Snorkelling is also done on the cape to the north, from where sunset views, over Mount Tarakani and the coast of Galela, are impressive.

Kupa Kupa Beach

Kupakupa beach, 10 kilometres (6.2 mi) from the town, has huge banyan trees on its shores, which makes the waters in the sheltered location inside the bay ideal for watersports, such as swimming, canoeing and snorkelling. The coral reef at its northern end is stated to be one of the finest. Pertamina harbour for oil-vessels is also located here.

Kumo beach

Kumo beach on the Kumo island is the nearest to Tabelo town – a few minutes of motorised canoeing – is the busiest beach in North Halmahera. Its natural surroundings are scenic. Swimming is safe here.

Tobotobo sea garden

Tobotobo Sea Garden in the Toboto village, which is ideal for snorkelling and diving. Thousands of bats are seen here clinging to the mangrove trees. White and blue pigeons take bath here.

Telaga Paca lake

Telaga Paca is a small crater lake close to Tobelo town to the south – a few km off the main road. The lake is set in a backdrop of thickly forested hills. There is also a small village by the same name Talaga Paca near the lake, which has a lookout area erected over stilts in the water to view the lake. A canoe could be hired to paddle in the lake. It is the source of drinking water to the village. Villagers fish in the lake.
