= North Halmahera Regency =

Regency in North Maluku, Indonesia

North Halmahera Regency Kabupaten Halmahera Utara
- Regency
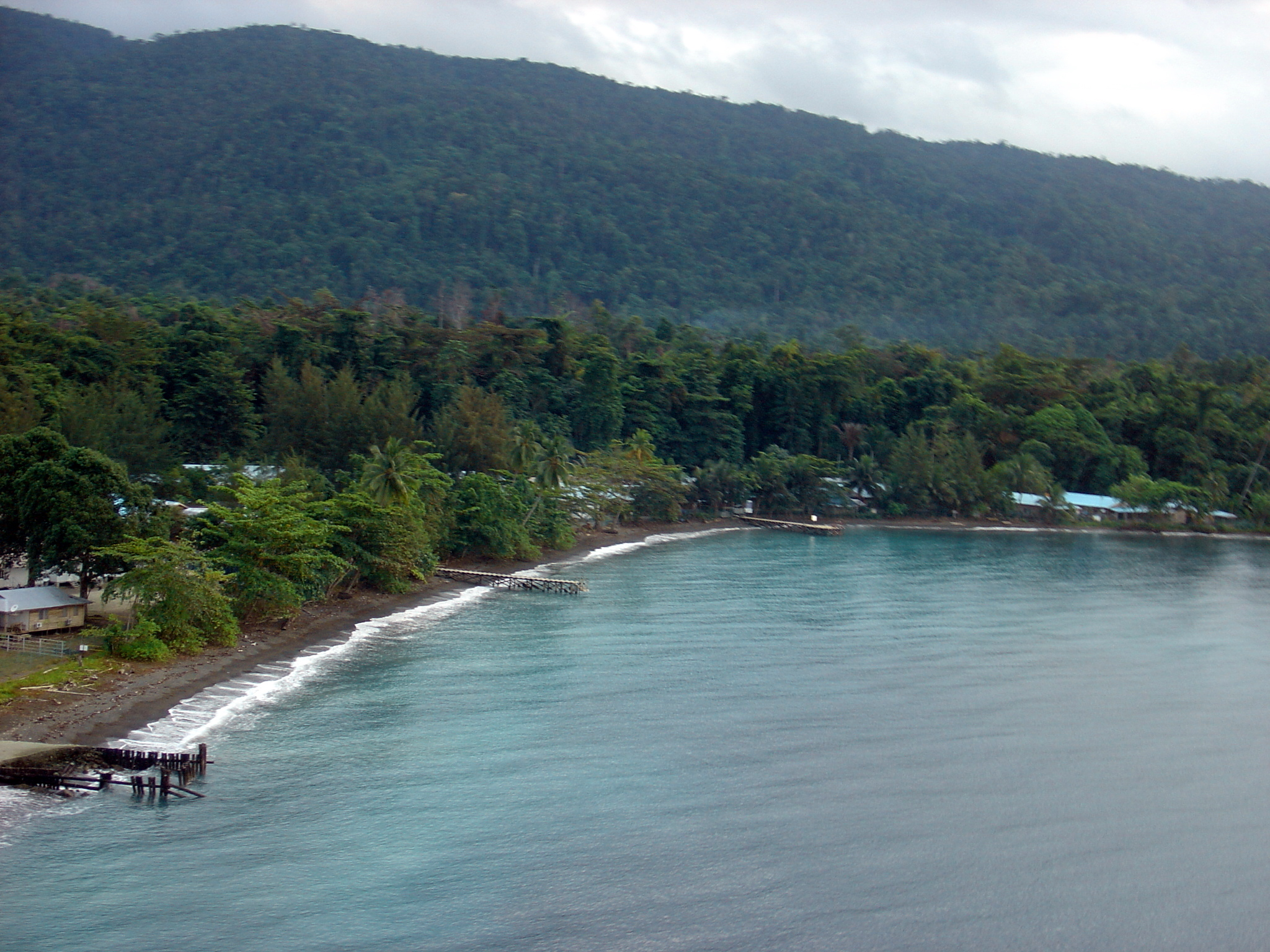
- View of North Halmahera Regency

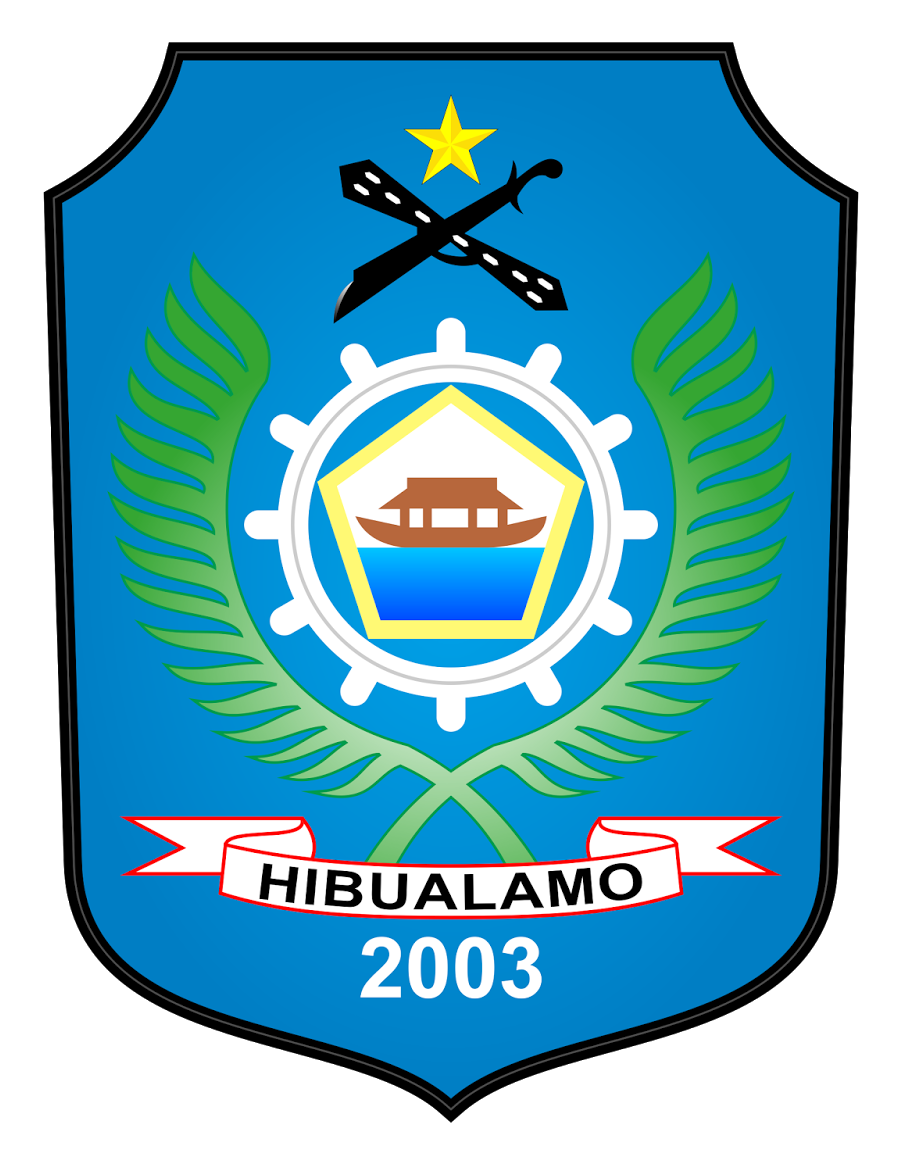
- Coat of arms
- Motto: Hibualamo (Big House)

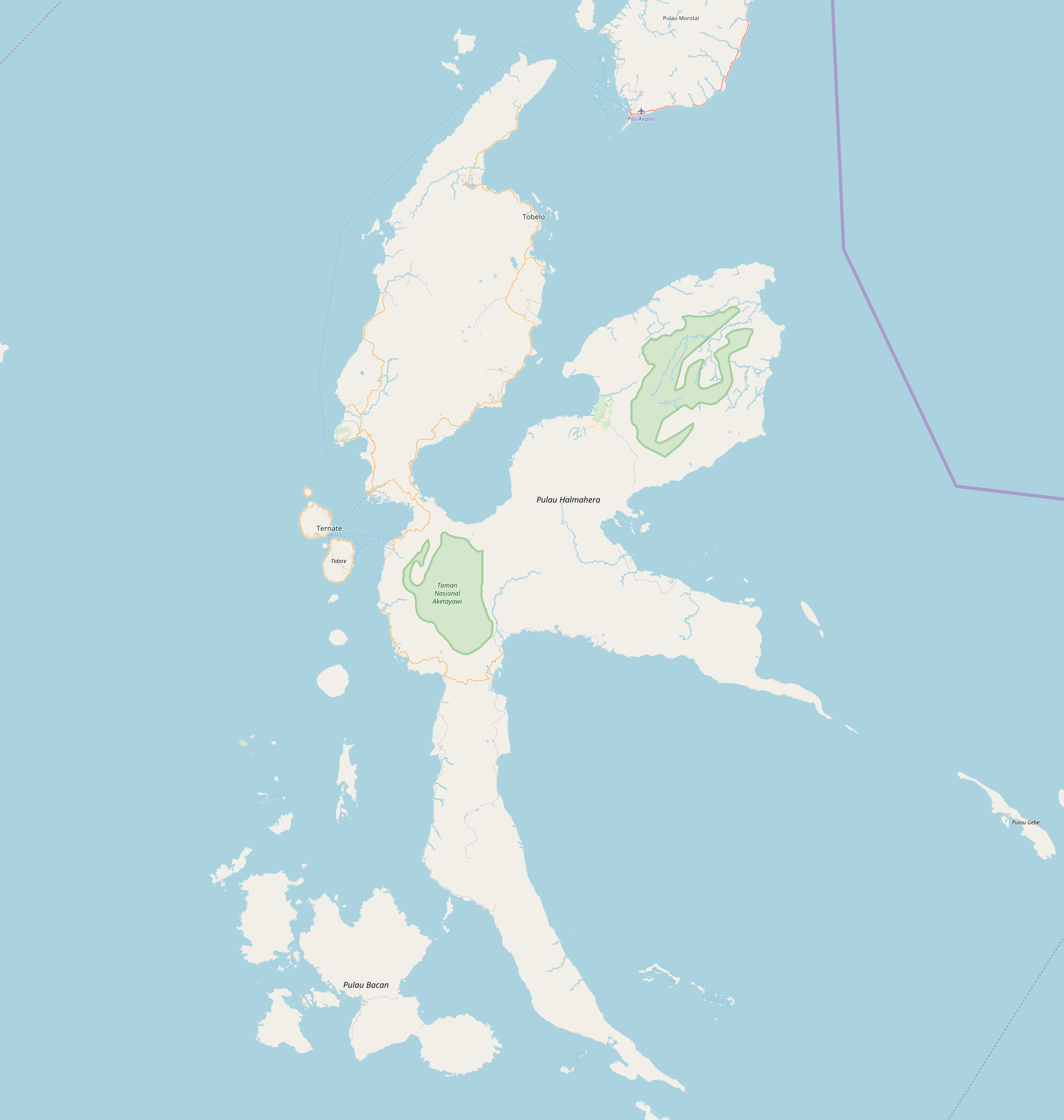
- Location in Maluku, Halmahera and Indonesia North Halmahera Regency (Halmahera) North Halmahera Regency (Indonesia)
- Coordinates: 1°43′55″N 128°0′28″E
- Country: Indonesia
- Province: North Maluku
- Capital: Tobelo

Government
  - Regent: Piet Hein Babua
  - Vice Regent: Kasman Hi. Ahmad

Area
  - Total: 3,404.27 km^{2} (1,314.40 sq mi)

Population (mid 2025 estimate)
  - Total: 207,623
  - Density: 60.9890/km^{2} (157.961/sq mi)

Demographics
  - Religion: Christianism 60.19% –Protestantism 59.33% –Catholicism 0.86% Islam 39.50% Hinduism 0.1% Buddhism 0.1% Other 0.28%
- Time zone: UTC+9 (IEST)
- Area code: (+62) 924
- Website: halmaherautarakab.go.id

North Halmahera Regency (Indonesian: Kabupaten Halmahera Utara) is a regency (on Halmahera Island) of North Maluku Province, Indonesia. It was declared a separate Regency on 25 February 2003, formed from part of the former North Maluku Regency. The regency shares a maritime border with Morotai Regency to the north, but its principal land border is with West Halmahera Regency to its west, although it also has a short land border with East Halmahera Regency in the far southeast. The capital town of the regency lies at the port of Tobelo.

The Regency, which was considerably reduced by the separation of Morotai Island to form a separate regency on 26 November 2008, covers an area of 3,404.27 square kilometres (1,314.40 mi^{2}) and had a population of 161,847 people at the 2010 census, 179,783 at the 2015 Intermediate Census. and 197,640 at the 2020 Census. The official estimate as of mid 2025 was 207,623 (comprising 106,416 males and 101,207 females). The principal settlements are Tobelo, Kao and Galela, which are the respective centres for the three principal ethnic and linguistic groups within the regency. The area is noted for its white beaches and coral reefs.

Apart from the importance of its 115 islands (19 have remained unnamed) for spices, North Hamahera was a World War II base camp. The Japanese and the American allies fought for its control. From the island of Morotai, Americans headed by General Douglas MacArthur prepared for an attack on the Philippines.

Halmahera and its small islands are located in the Coral Triangle, which has rich marine life. Marine biodiversity data on reef fishes was collected during a rapid survey conducted at 28 locations in 2005 in the south-western part of Halmahera. Explorer Gerry Allen, during his diving surveys in 2005, recorded 803 species of reef fishes.

== History ==
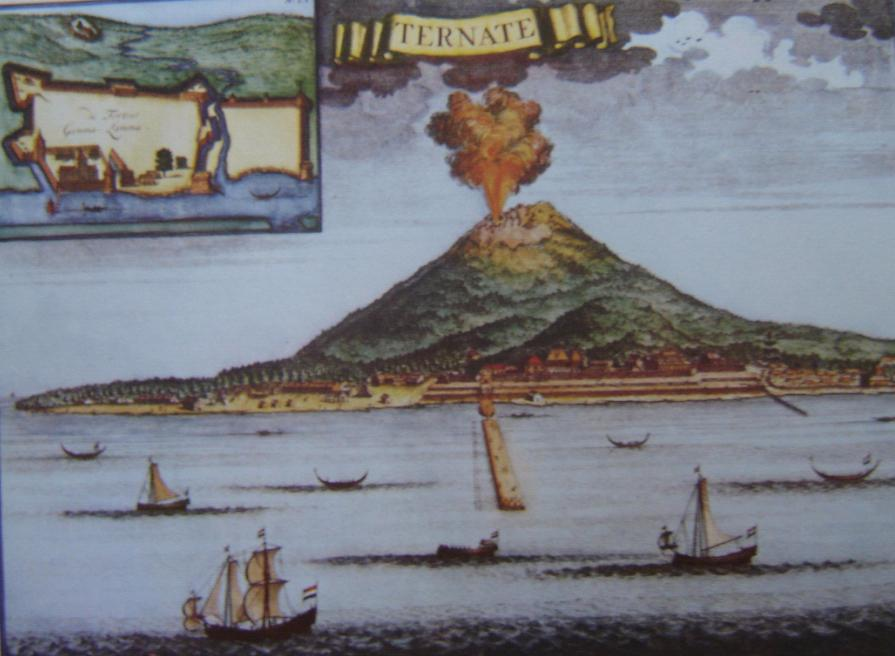
A 1720 depiction of Ternate island and Portuguese ships from Halmahera

During the 15th and 16th centuries, the area was generally within the sphere of influence of the powerful sultanate on the island of Ternate. A larger region, called Moro, included the island of Morotai and parts of the North Halmahera coastline.
The Portuguese were a formidable presence in the area and they built a number of fortifications and controlled the island Ternate, off the southwest coast of the North Halmahera Regency. In the mid-16th century, a Portuguese Jesuit mission visited Halmahera and Morotai. This created conflict with Muslims who at the time controlled Ternate and Halmahera and in 1571, they drove the Christians from Morotai.

In the early 17th century, the town of Dodinga, strategically located on Halmahera's west coast grew in influence. In 1627 and 1628, Sultan Hamzah of Ternate had much of the Christian population of the island moved to Malaya, on Ternate. Later, it was administered under the Dutch East Indies.

Since the 1980s, mining development and logging has dramatically increased in the area, often causing conflict with local inhabitants. The communities are dependent on fishing and forests and the financial benefits of these resources have gone to Jakarta and local elites outside Halmahera. These developments have also increased religious tension in the region. The Christians of North Halmahera were traditionally said to generally live a peaceful co-existence with Muslims, but violence broke out between the two religious groups in December 1999 and has since been the primary cause of conflict in the region. Many of the Christians on the island fled to Tobelo as a haven when the violence broke out. Shortly after the official area of the North Halmahera Regency was declared on 31 May 2003, in July 2003, 38 villages in Halmahera staged a protest against the Australian mining company Newcrest who is mining gold in the region.

When the decision was made to create the regency of North Halmahera, it was promised in the national parliament in Jakarta that a duty-free port similar to Batam would be established on Morotai Island. However, this never happened, as internal conflict led to a demand that Morotai should be separated from the regency. Hein Nemotemo, a Christian politician, rejected this move, given that Morotai is overwhelmingly Muslim. In August 2006, five members of the North Halmahera Regency legislature from Golkar, including Abdul Gafur lobbied in the national capital for the separation of Morotai as a new regency distinct from the North Halmahera Regency. This was approved by the Committee II in Jakarta and also by the provincial governor Thaib Armaiyn. From February to April 2007, supporters of the Morotai separatist movement sealed off the government headquarters, demanding that Morotai should become separate immediately. The split was delayed and in 2008, Nemotemo's group were all that stood in the way of the split. Fearing a repeat of the 1999-2000 violence, Nemotemo backed down. During the 2009 elections in Indonesia a governor candidate for Morotai was elected and it became a new regency.

== Geography and environment ==
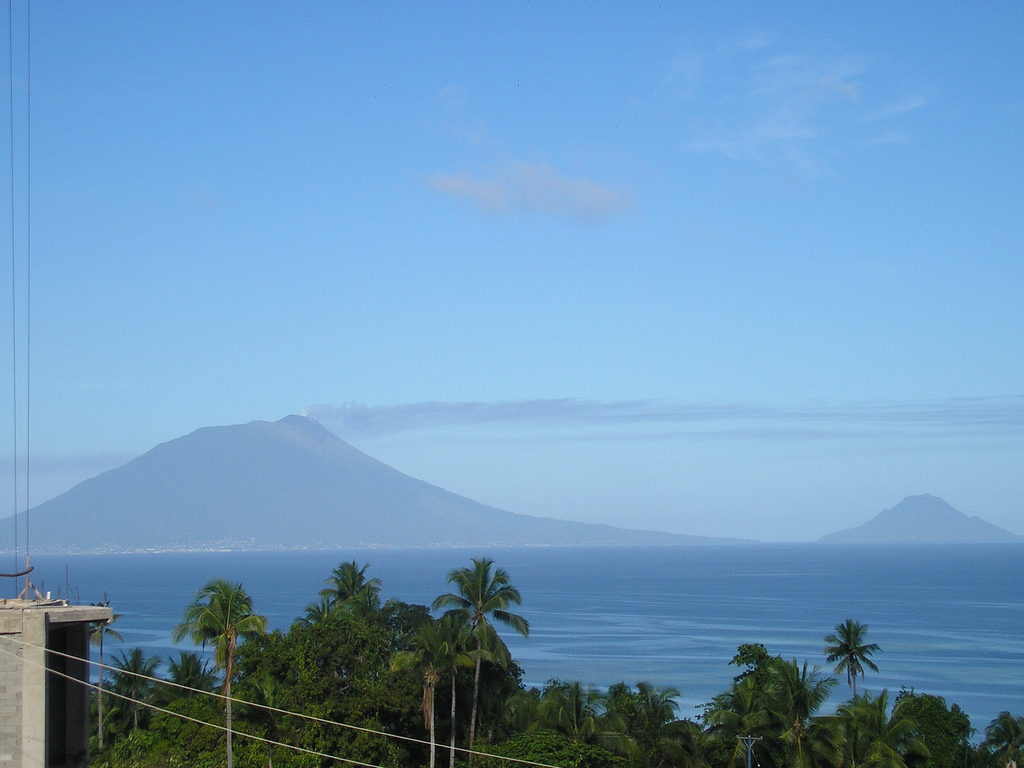
Ternate island. View from North Halmahera

The North Halmahera Regency is located in northeastern Indonesia between the islands of New Guinea and Sulawesi. It occupies roughly half of the northern mainland section of the island and includes smaller islands (Loloda Kepulauan) off the northwest coast of Halmahera. It formerly included the larger island of Morotai to the northeast of the headland but this was administratively separated to form its own regency on 29 October 2008. Natural ecosystems found in the two regions in North Halmahera Regency, among others, include coral reefs, mangrove forests, seagrass beds, sandy beaches, rocky beaches, estuaries, lagoons and deltas. While artificial ecosystems, among others, include the areas of tourism, ports and fish landing centres, cultivated areas and residential areas of society. The coral reefs of North Halmahera are of particular note, and form part of the Coral Triangle which is world-renowned for its coastal and marine biodiversity, which includes 70 genera of corals and about 2,500 fish species, about 70 percent of all fish species known to the western Indo-Pacific. The Wildlife Conservation Society is working with the Department of Marine Fisheries-DKP of the provincial government of North Maluku to monitor this environment.

Marine conservation and tourism

Halmahera's marine biodiversity and rich marine resources are not receiving the needed marine conservation priority attention. The objective of this attention should be to combine it with development of other economic sectors such as fisheries, marine tourism, oil and gas, and achieve a sustainable economic development of the marine resources and conserve its marine diversity value. To take appropriate decisions in the matter, the Nature Conservancy, WWF-Indonesia and other partners have initiated studies for a preliminary assessment on the prospects for "marine conservation and tourism in the Halmahera area". The surveys also cover study of the ecological link between Halmahera and the Bird's Head Seascape to the east and the Sulu-Sulawesi Seascape on the west.

== Administration ==
The regency was formerly divided into twenty-two districts (kecamantan) and contained 260 villages. More recently, the creation on 29 October 2008 of a separate regency for Morotai Island has removed the five districts on that island from North Halmahera, and thus it now contains seventeen districts, tabulated below from south to north with their areas, their 2010 Census and 2020 Census populations, together with the official estimates for mid 2025, The districts are grouped below into three geographical sectors, reflecting the three principal ethno-linguistic sectors within the regency, although these are without any administrative significance. The table also includes the locations of the district administrative centres, the number of administrative villages (all classified as rural desa) in each district and their post codes.

Kode Wilayah	Name of District (kecamatan)	English name	Area in km^{2}	Pop'n Census 2010	Pop'n Census 2020	Pop'n estimate mid 2025	Admin centre	No. of Villages	Post Code
82.03.22	Kao Teluk	Kao Bay	111.83	3,590	6,440	6,838	Dum Dum	11	97765
82.03.08	Malifut	(South Kao)	359.44	11,006	13,160	13,845	Ngofa Kiaha	22	97766
82.03.07	Kao	(Central Kao)	138.43	7,513	9,210	9,826	Kao	14	97764
82.03.21	Kao Barat	West Kao	835.93	8,092	9,360	9,991	Tolabit	21	97764
82.03.20	Kao Utara ^{(a)}	North Kao	221.85	10,509	13,260	14,408	Daru	12	97764
Sub-totals for	Southern (Kao) Sector		1,667.48	40,710	51,700	54,908		80	
82.03.13	Tobelo Barat	West Tobelo	249.81	4,358	6,190	6,322	Kusuri	5	97762
82.03.12	Tobelo Timur ^{(b)}	East Tobelo	73.52	6,283	7,010	7,375	Mawea	6	97767
82.03.06	Tobelo Selatan	South Tobelo	136.01	13,054	15,230	15,966	Kupa Kupa	13	97768
82.03.11	Tobelo Tengah ^{(c)}	Central Tobelo	111.99	12,543	15,370	17,093	Pitu	9	97768
82.03.05	Tobelo ^{(d)}	(Tobelo town)	126.07	29,377	34,150	35,218	Gamsungi	10	97762
82.03.10	Tobelo Utara ^{(e)}	North Tobelo	151.56	9,714	11,900	12,531	Gorua	10	97767
Sub-totals for	Central (Tobelo) Sector		848.96	75,329	89,850	94,505		53	
82.03.04	Galela	(Central Galela)	95.47	7,390	8,760	8,942	Soa Sio	7	97761
82.03.16	Galela Selatan	South Selatan	113.86	7,491	8,990	9,650	Soakonora	7	97769
82.03.14	Galela Barat	West Galala	110.59	9,283	10,880	11,823	Dokulamo	9	97761
82.03.15	Galela Utara	North Galela	268.68	7,053	9,290	9,470	Salimuli	12	97769
82.03.09	Loloda Utara	North Loloda	247.62	8,627	10,510	10,792	Dorume	18	97763
82.03.19	Loloda Kepulauan ^{(f)}	Loloda Islands	51.61	5,964	7,950	7,533	Dama	10	97763
Sub-totals for	Northern (Galela/Loloda) Sector		887.83	45,808	56,380	58,210		63	
Totals for	Regency		3,404.27	161,847	197,640	207,623	Tobelo	196	

Notes: (a) includes Pulau Bobale (Bobale Island) off the east coast of Halmahera. (b) includes 6 small offshore islands.
(c) includes 6 small offshore islands. (d) includes 7 small offshore islands. (e) includes 3 small offshore islands.
(f) comprising a group of 58 islands off the northwest coast of Halmahera, of which the largest are Pulau Doi, Pulau Dagasuli and Pulau Salangadeke.

== Demographics ==
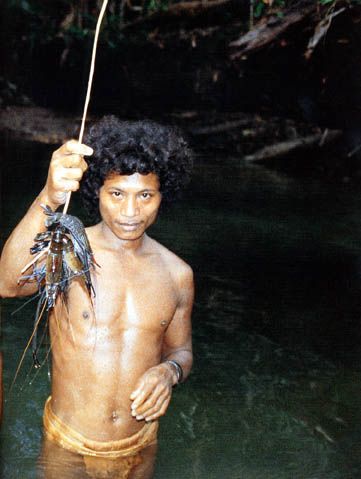
Togutil native of Halmahera

As of 2010, North Halmahera had a population of 161,847, which rose by 2020 to 197,640, and by mid 2025 was about 207,623. The main indigenous ethnic groups are Tobelorese, Galelarese, Lolodarese, Kaonese, Pagu and Modole. The remaining 10% are immigrants, mainly from Java, Sulawesi and other parts of North Maluku, especially Makian Island. The Lolodarese ethic area extends south of the regency boundary to encompass the districts of Loloda and Loloda Tengah (both districts of West Halmahera Regency) with some 14,000 inhabitants in 2025.

== Economy ==
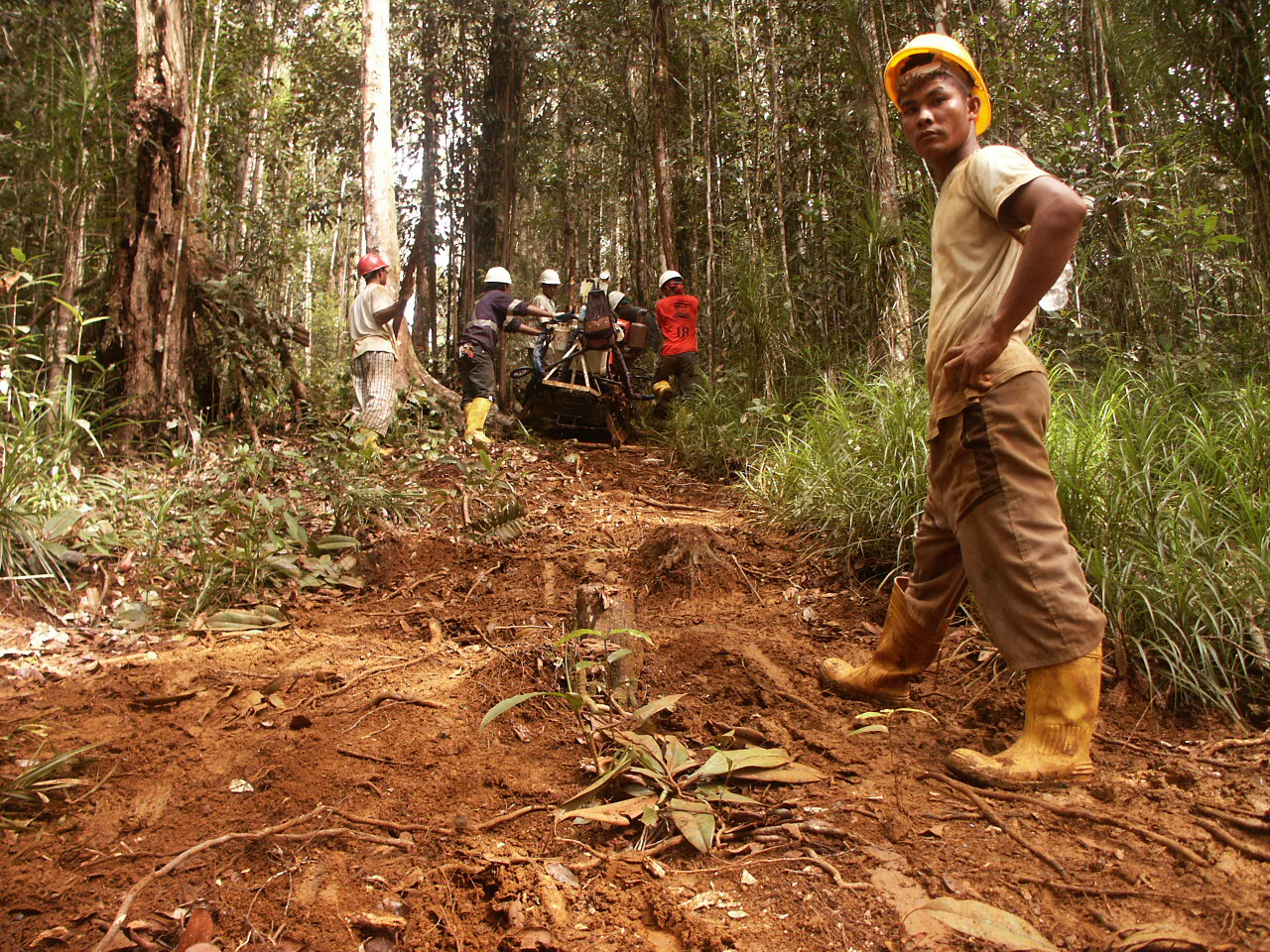
Exploration for metals in Halmahera Island

About 75% of the population of North Halmahera are dependent on agriculture, especially plantation coconut and clove. In 2004, coconut production amounted to 55,435 hectares (136,980 acres) and 66.199 thousand tonnes and cloves 3,175.5 hectares and 320.71 tonnes. Palm plantation area in 2002 amounted to 47,900 hectares (118,000 acres) with a production of 68.5 thousand tonnes. Tobelo, South Tobelo and Galela are the highest oil producing areas and contain several oil terminals. Aside from those mentioned above, the main crops grown are banana, rice, corn, peanuts, soybeans, cassava, maize, coffee, cocoa, nutmeg and some types of fruits such as oranges, mango and durian. Some types of livestock have been developed, including goat, cattle, chickens, hens, and pigs. The North Halmahera Regency has some 536,000 hectares (1,320,000 acres) of forest, 145,500 hectares (360,000 acres) of which is protected and 26,250 hectares (64,900 acres) of which is under production. Mining reserves have been identified in the area, namely gold, natural gas and nickel ore. There are gold mines in Kao District and Loloda District (Dotia village). Geothermal energy resources are also available in the District of Galela (Mamuya village). On Doi Island, some reserves of iron and copper have been found.

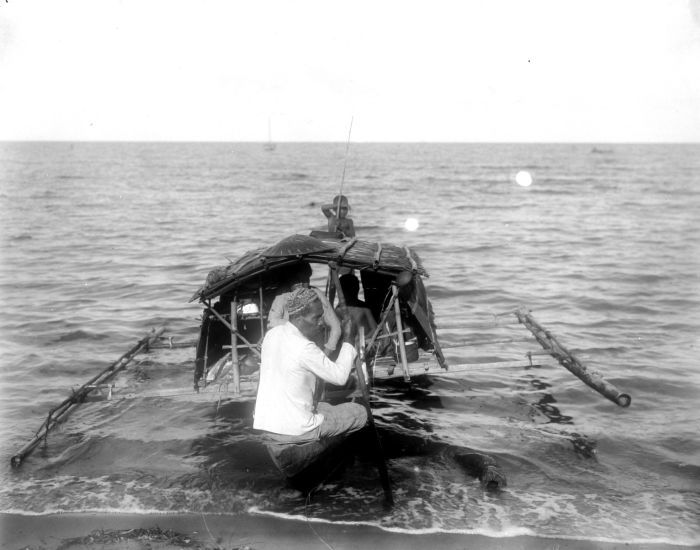
Local fishermen

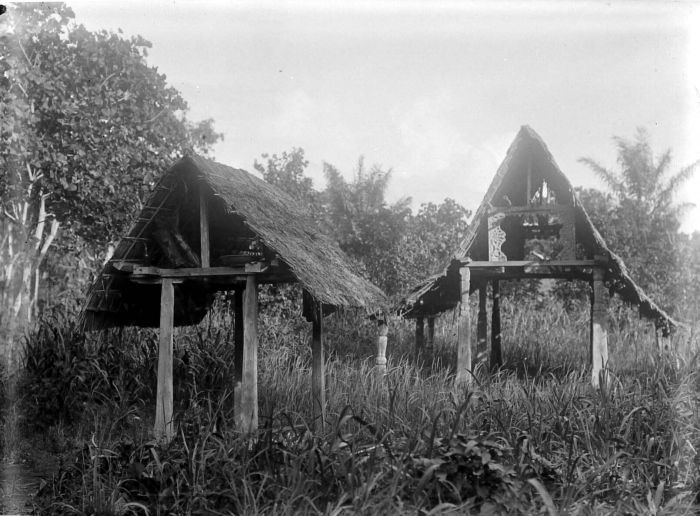
Buildings in Galela

Based on research results of the Marine Fisheries Research Institute (1983), the potential of fish resources (standing stock) found in North Halmahera waters is estimated at 644,382.48 tonnes. Fishing is important to the economic activity of the region. Most people in North Halmahera Regency inhabit coastal areas and depend upon these marine ecosystems as a source of social economic life. Until the year 2002, the contribution of capture fisheries production amounted to 98,782.21 tonnes or roughly 65% of the total overall production. In addition to the fish resources, several types of other resources have high economic value and have been exploited by the fishing communities in the coastal areas and small islands, such as crustacea, Egg Sea cucumbers (Holothuroidea), mollusc, and seaweed. The fishing equipment used by most fishermen in the region of North Halmahera is traditional, such as nets. The extent of coastal and marine areas with a high water quality allows for the development of marine aquaculture, especially Grouper, lobster, seaweed and pearls. Until now, optimisation and productivity of aquaculture in North Halamahera has been low. Until the year 2002 the total area of cultivation of marine, brackish and pond reached 128,110 ha, producing just 46,550 tonnes, or 0.03% of the total volume of production.

There is an availability of facilities and infrastructure to support the economy such as ports, banks, markets and primary business activity which is predominantly concentrated in the capital of Tobelo. GDP in 2005 amounted to 373,693.21 million rupee. In the year 2003, the economy of North Halmahera increased 2.93%, 3.33% in 2004, and 3.54% in 2005.

== Culture ==
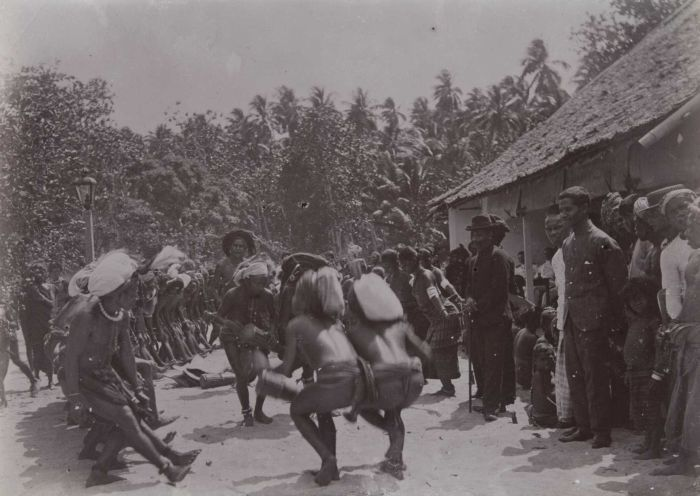
Traditional dance on Loloda island in the early 20th century

One festival of note is the annual North Halmahera Cultural Festival, when the people wear full traditional ceremonial dress. Traditional weddings in the capital of Tobelo are also said to be among the most colourful in Maluku and the Christians follow traditions during their wedding ceremonies, with traditional music and dance. A wedding is typically accompanied by traditional Tobelorese music, played with gongs and drums and a Cakele dance is usually performed in front of the bride as she approaches the groom. Around the time of New Year, Tobelo attracts a number of Yangere groups (such as the Orang Hutan band etc.) from all over North Halmahera who perform music and dances.

== Languages ==
Apart from the Indonesian language, the indigenous inhabitants have their own languages. One such language is Tobelo spoken by about 50,000 people in the island of Halhamera. Another is Galelarese and the related Lolodarese, spoken by about 80,000 people on Halmahera (including in the Loloda and Loloda Tengah Districts of neighbouring West Halmahera Regency) as well as on Morotai Island. A third group in the south of the regency speak the Kao language, although that is being largely displaced by Ternate Malay.

== Religion ==
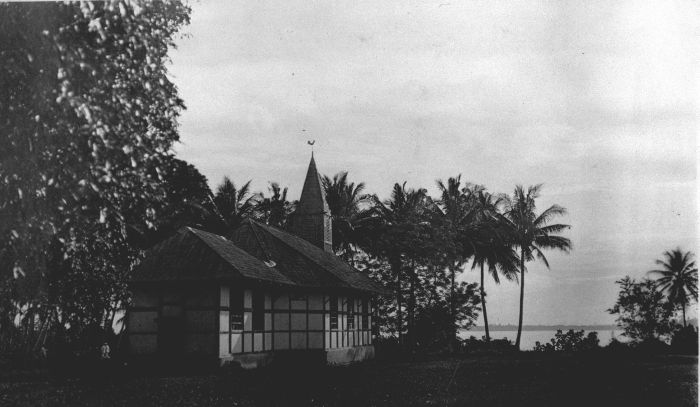
Protestant Church in Tobelo

The main religions in North Halmahera are primarily Christianity and Islam. Muslims and Christians had lived here from the 16th century. The two communities lived peacefully following the cultural tradition of the Hibua Lamo (a pact between Muslims and Christians to live together without aggressive designs against each other and cooperating on all matters of mutual interest). Tobelo, the capital of North Halmahera Regency, is a particularly strong Christian community and was visited by missionaries in the late 19th century and early 20th century also. They left a long-standing legacy and a Protestant church was built in the capital. In Tobelo, a predominantly Christian community celebrates Christmas colourfully with street arches and buntings made with bamboo poles arching over the side of the roads hung with lights and multi-coloured flags. At Easter, local church congregations hold a competition to see who can create the best Easter garden.

=== Riots ===
In the beginning of 1999, there were ethnic clashes between Muslims and Christians in Ambon city, but also in North Maluku where the mostly Christian community of the Kao community attacked the mostly Muslim Makian. This disturbed the peace that existed between the two communities in Ternate, Tidore, Galela and Tobelo, before spreading to the rest of the province. The issue got aggravated in spite of efforts by both groups for reconciliation. Several thousand Christians fled from Ternate and Central Halmahera and took shelter in Tobelo and it turned into a refugee camp. Muslims fled from Tobelo and Kao. However, outside forces like the Laskar Jihad precipitated the issue and there was a gradual built up of tension in the region, which ultimately resulted in the worst rioting in Tobelo on 24 December 1999, which spread to other towns as well and it continued until late 2000. Remnants of this rioting are still seen and an atmosphere of mistrust prevails. Galela is another town where remnants of strife (burnt out churches and mosques) between religious groups are still seen with military checkposts.

== Volcano ==
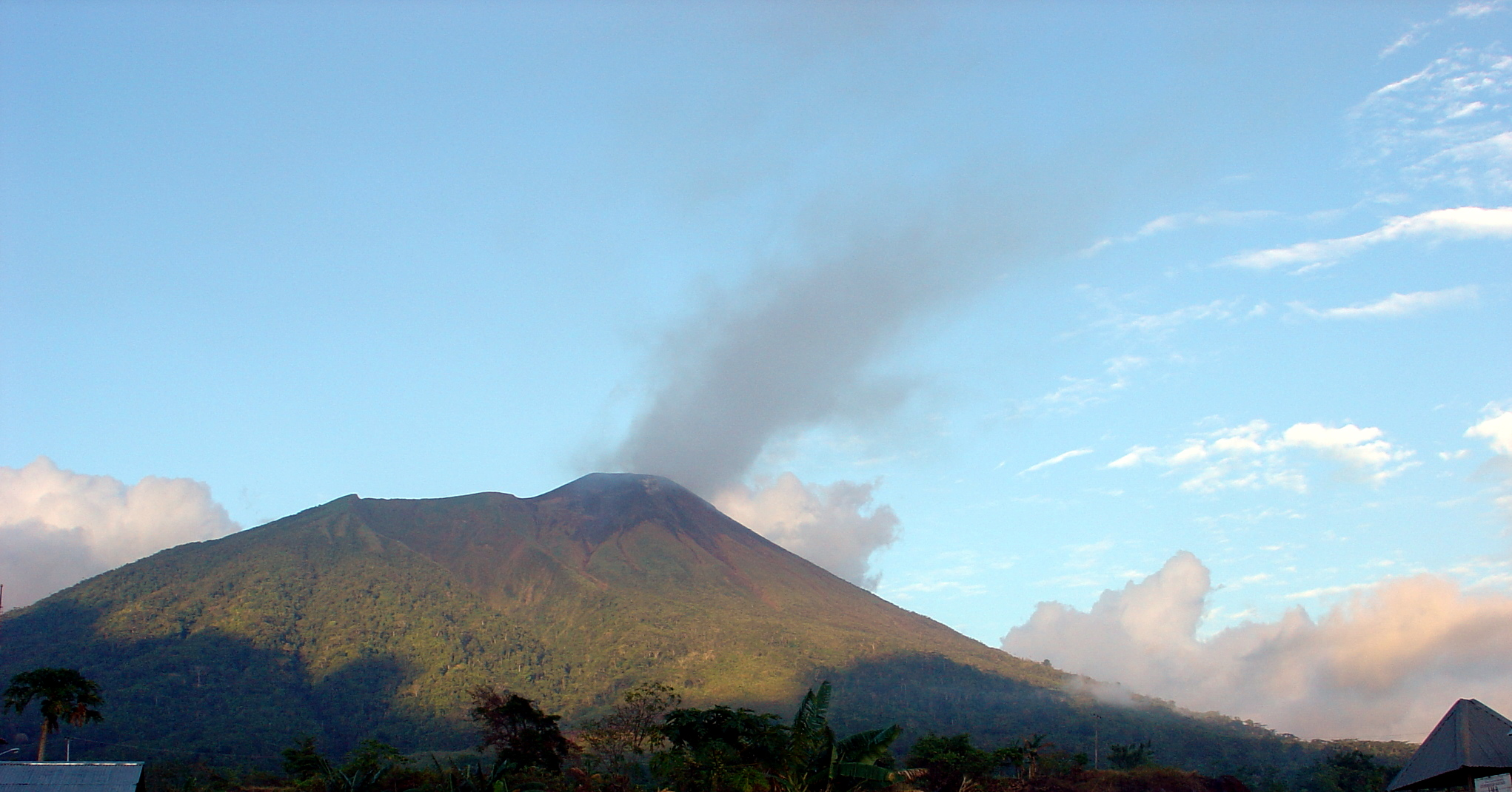
Mount Dukono, a volcano in North Halmahera Regency of North Maluku Province.

Mount Dukono is a 185-metre-high (607 ft) volcano that is one of the three most active volcanoes not only on Halmahera island but also in Indonesia. The volcanic mountain is accessed from the Mamuya village. There is a volcanology information centre which provides latest information on the current status of the volcano.

== Other sights ==
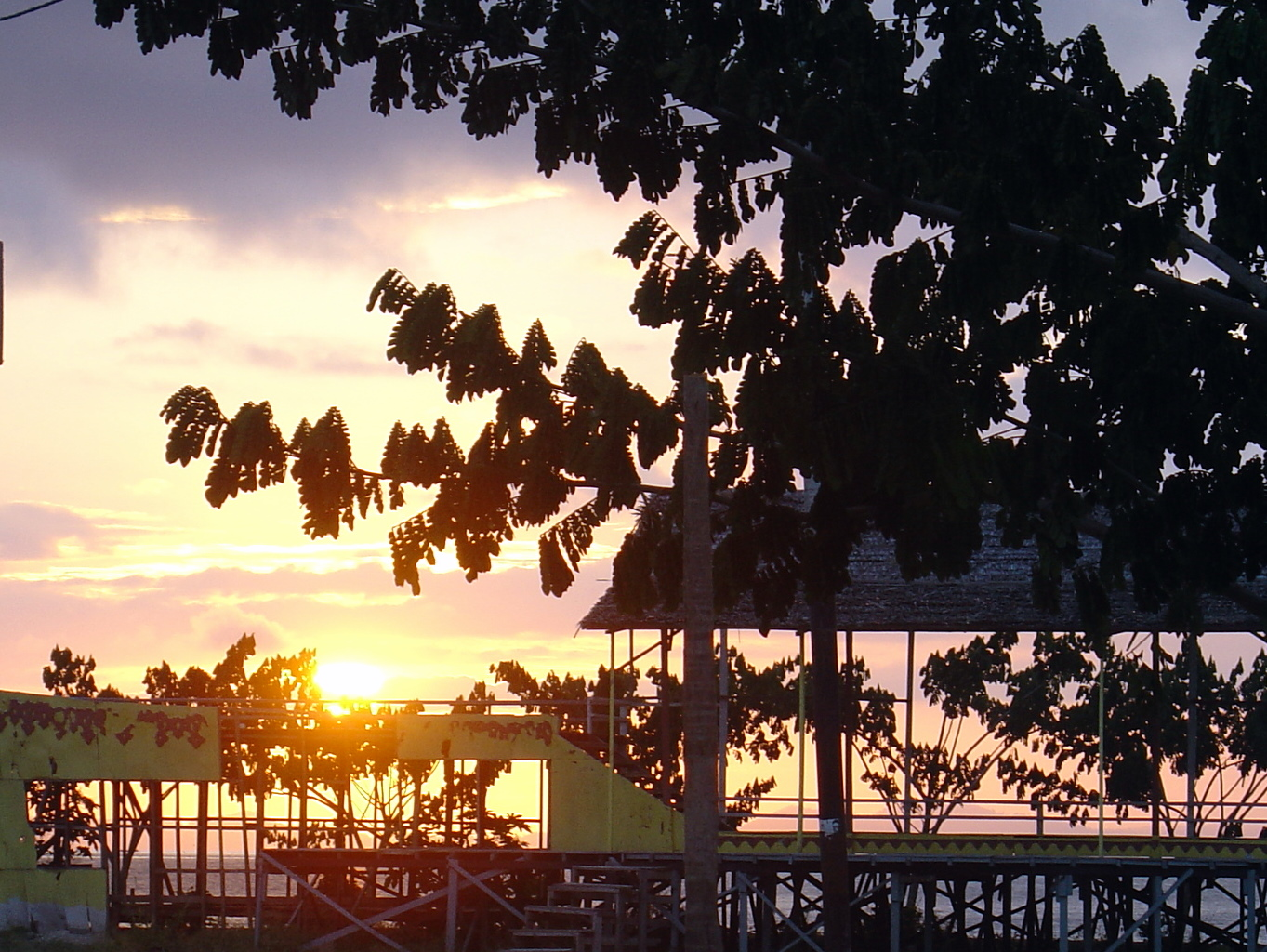
Sun rise at Ternate in North Halmahera

Mamuya hot spring

Mamuya hot spring in Mamuya village in Galelo is a hot spring emanating from a volcano by the same name. Spring water is said to have curing qualities for skin problems and hence is a popular attraction among the local people. It is only 15 kilometres (9.3 mi) from Tobelo town.

Wangongira rice field

Wangongira rice fields are known for the special variety of rice grown along the swift flowing river called Molulu. It is located in Wangongira village in West Tobelo.

World War II Japanese tunnels

World War II Japanese tunnels, located below the road, are in the Samuda and Duma villages of West Galela District. The tunnels were used by the Japanese army during WW II. The one in Samuda Tunnel is 20 meters with many rooms and halls.

== See also ==
- List of districts of North Maluku
