= List of ethnic groups of Southwest Papua =

List of ethnic groups in Southwest Papua, Indonesia:

== List ==
Ethnic group	Linguistic classification	Regency	Districts and villages	Clans and subgroups
Abun	Language isolate or West Papuan	Tambrauw	Sausapor District: Sausapor, Jokte, Emaus, and Uigwem villages	Yekwam, Yenjau, Yeblo, Yesnath, Yenbra, Yenggrem, Yesomkor, Yerin, Yeror, Yewen, Yemam, Yesian
Ambel (-Waren)	Austronesian	Raja Ampat	Waigeo Utara District: Kabare and Kapadiri villages. Teluk Manyalibit District: Kabilol, Go, Waifoy, Warimak, Kalitoko and Warsamdin villages.	Aitem, Daam, Fiay, Lapon, Mentansan, Wakaf
Awe		Sorong Selatan	Kais District: Sumano, Kampung Benawa 1, and Kampung Benawa 2 villages. Kokoda District: Migrito village.	Awaje, Aume, Budori, Kumude
Ayamaru	Maybrat	Maybrat	Ayamaru District and Ayamaru Timur District	Bless, Jitmau, Kambuaya, Kambu, Kareth, Kolis, Mder, Naa, Nauw, Salosa, Sinon, Vaa
Ayfat	Maybrat	Maybrat	Ayfat Utara District (in Fonatu and Ayawasi villages), Ayfat Timur District, Ayfat Selatan District, Ayfat Barat District	Air, Asem, Aserem, Fanataf, Fatem, Fatih, Haya, Kaaf, Kocu, Korain, Kosho, Kosamah, Kamak, Korabuku, Mate, Sewiay, Sasio, Saa, Sawuk, Sorry, Taa, Turot, Tenau, Yater, Yam, Yumte
Aytinyo	Maybrat	Maybrat	Aytinyo District	Antoh, Asmuruf, Atkana, Bosawer, Iik, Sangkek, Wanane
Batanta	Austronesian	Raja Ampat	Samate District: Yenanas and Wailebet villages	
Biak Betew	Austronesian	Raja Ampat	Waigeo Selatan District: Saonek, Saporkren, Yenbeser, Yenwaupur, Sawinggrai, Kapisawar, and Arborek villages. Waigeo Barat District: Mutus, Biantsyi, Waisilip, Manyaifun, Meos Manggara, and Pam villages. Kofiau District (Mikiran): Deer, Balal, and Tolobi villages. Misool District: Pulau Tikus, Solol, Meos Kapal, and Umkabu villages. Samate District: Jefman village. Teluk Manyalibit District: Mumes village.	Ambafen, Ambrauw, Dimara, Fakdawer, Kasiepo, Mambraku, Mambrasar, Mayor, Rumfaker, Sauyai, Umpain, Watem
Biak Kafdaron	Austronesian	Raja Ampat	Samate District: Yensawai, Amdui, Yenanas, and Aresi villages	Kabes, Kapisa, Omkarsba, Rumbewas, Saleo, Sor
Biak Karon (Bikar)	Austronesian	Tambrauw	Sausapor District (in Sausapor village) and Biak Karo District	Aduk, Kurni, Kmur, Mofu, Mampioper, Mamoribo, Mayor, Mambrasar, Mirino, Padwa Paraibabo, Rumansara, Rumayom, Rumere, Sisdifu, Sarwa, Warsa, Weju, Yapen
Biak Usba	Austronesian	Raja Ampat	Waigeo Utara District: Rauki village. Ayau District: Dorekar and Meosbekwan villages.	Burdam, Imbir, Mambrisau, Rumbewas, Umpes
Biak Wardo	Austronesian	Raja Ampat	Waigeo Timur District: Yensner, Urbinasopen, Yembekaki, and Puper villages. Waigeo Utara District: Menir, Warwanai, Boni, Asukweri, and Kabare villages. Ayau District: Rutung, Reni, and Yenkawir villages.	Mayor, Mirino, Rayar, Rumbarak, Sanadi, Yapen
Biga	Austronesian	Raja Ampat	Misol Timur Selatan District: Biga village	Nack
Bira	South Bird's Head	Sorong Selatan	Inanwatan District: Sibae, Mate, Wadoi, Serkos, Wadoi, Mugibi, Solta Baru, and Siri-Siri villages	Abasare, Adoi, Aidore, Apireri, Arispay, Aupe, Bandi, Beremi, Bowayire, Dedaida, Eramuri, Fatari, Geyse, Giritowi, Gobotuka, Guaramuri, Gurarai, Iben, Kerewarin, Kewesare, Kohdetare, Kopisi, Korindae, Magawe, Makamur, Mamari, Marakey, Masere, Masui, Mibi, Mugury, Musake, Mumuremi, Muturi, Nabore, Naonara, Nerwa, Obure, Obadiri, Ogobue, Sadak, Saupar, Serue, Siruri, Sowoy, Suga-Suga, Porat, Tabarai, Taresi, Tawe, Tohid, Tugakere, Tugerpai, Turindae, Warigi, Witogae, Yawae
Butlih	Austronesian	Raja Ampat	Salawati Island: Samate, Kapatlap, Kalobo, and Sakabu villages	Rumsayor, Rumadas, Rumbruren, Rumbekwan, Rumfabe, Rumbobyar, Rumakew, Rumander, Sobyar
Duriankari	West Bird's Head	Sorong Regency	Central Salawati District: Duriankari	
Domu	Austronesian	Raja Ampat	Salawati Island: Samate, Kapatlap, Kalobo, and Sakabu villages	
Emeyode		Sorong Selatan	Kokoda District: Tarof, Negeri Besar, Daubak, Topdan, and Migirito villages	Agia, Angiluli, Biawa, Birawako, Beyete, Damoi, Derago, Gogoba, Irewa, Imo, Jare, Maratar, Mudaye, Nawari, Tayo, Tamar, Turae, Tobi, Tameye, Totaragu, Ugaya, Ugaje
Fiawat	Austronesian	Raja Ampat	Salawati Island: Samate, Kapatlap, Kalobo, and Sakabu villages	
Irires		Tambrauw	Kebar District: Akmuri village. Senopi District: Asiti village. Miyah District: Miri and Meis villages.	Apoki, Aibesa, Airai, Aneti, Aifamas, Morgifos, Syufi, Sasior
Iwaro (Metemani)	South Bird's Head	Sorong Selatan	Matemani District: Saga and Puragi villages. Inanwatan District: Isogo village.	Bitae, Gawa, Giwa, Karara, Maratar, Maybial, Mitobi, Segea, Sigea, Taire, Tapure
Kais	South Bird's Head	Sorong Selatan	Kais (Tapuri) village	Abago, Asikasau, Bandhi, Kaitau, Saimar, Sepa, Sira, Tebe
Kawe (Ma'ya)	Austronesian	Raja Ampat	Waigeo Barat District: Selpele, Bianci, Salio, and Walsilip villages	Arempelei, Ayei, Ayelou, Dimalau, Daat, Sunjapale, Sakaipele, Sakaiganan, Sunjaganang
Laganyan (Ma'ya)	Austronesian	Raja Ampat	Teluk Manyalibit District: Arowai, Lopintol, and Beu villages	
Matbat	Austronesian	Raja Ampat	Misool Timur District: Tumolol, Lenmalas, Lenmalas Timur Barat, Audam, Foley, and Eduai villages. Misool Utara District: Atkari and Salafen villages. Misool Barat District: Magei village.	Botot, Dai, Dlutot, Elwot, Falo, Fale, Fatot, Fam, Falon, Fom, Fadimpo, Hai, Impon, Jemput, Kei, Lan, Mjam, Mluy, Moom, Waltei
Matlow	Austronesian	Raja Ampat	Misool District: Waigama village South Misool District: Fafanlap, Dabatan, Yellu, Usaha Jaya, and Kayerepop villages West Misool District: Gamta and Lilinta villages	
Meybrat	Maybrat	Maybrat		Ayamaru, Ayfat, Aytinyo
Miyah		Tambrauw	Senopi District, Miyah District, Fef District, Syujak District	Baa, Bobarku, Baru, Bame, Bofra, Hae, Irun, Kinho, Momo, Nsoo, Sedik, Siraro, Tawer, Titit
Moi (Moi-Maya)	West Bird's Head	Raja Ampat	South Salawati District	Kafmaru, Kalapain, Komirin, Moifilit, Tana, Walla, Wehmint
Moi	West Bird's Head	Sorong City		Aresi, Anggaloli, Kadang, Katumlas, Kabera, Kanteng, Klalibi, Kilala, Kalagin, Kwatolo, Kalami, Klasoat, Kalawaisa, Kasilit, Kalagison, Kumuwai, Kumune, Kayaru, Laibin, Lobat, Malagam, Malaum, Mobilala, Mubalus, Malantu, Malibela, Mlasmene, Mugu, Osok, Sigime, Wilin, Woloseme
Moi	West Bird's Head	Sorong Regency		Eryergit, Gifelem, Hable, Kalalu, Klah-man, Kalawen, Kahrin, Klalibi, Kilala, Kalagin, Kwatolo, Kalami, Kalasoat, Kalawaisa, Kalagison, Kalasia, Kameryep, Katumlas, Klasafle, Klobatkla, Klatifle, Klem, Lobat, Mrar, Mobilala, Melebuh, Moifilit, Mubalus, Malantu, Malibela, Meidjin, Mosena, Mlasmene, Malalamen, Mugule, Malakamen, Osok, Pa, Sani, Son, Sakadja, Simol, Siatsan, Seliokli, Syalubu, Syufanfle, Syufanklin, Syatfle, Tuen, Umalelen, Watlok, Wan, Wilin, Woloseme, Yademan, Yamese Ayok, Bikiou, Borai, Indow, Kob, Mansim, Pungwam, Rieinggup, Sayori, Tibiai, Ullo, Umpasut, Warfandu, Wonggor
Mpur	Mpur	Tambrauw	Kebar District, Kebar Timur District, Manekar District, Amberbaken District, Mubrani District, Senopi District: Akmuri, Nekori, Ibuanari, Atai, Anjai, Jandurau, Ajami, Inam, Senopi, Asiti, Wausin, and Afrawi villages	Api, Ayeri, Akmuri, Asentowi, Asimi, Aremi, Awori, Apoki, Aropi, Ambuak, Amuapon, Anjai, Ajoi, Ariks, Asiar, Atai, Abiri, Amawi, Anari, Awabiti, Ajebuani, Ajokwapi, Asrow, Asiti, Bame, Bonepai, Bandopi, Bompaya, Bijinawi, Duri, Ina, Jambuani, Kasi, Katupi, Kedi, Kebar, Kapawayai, Makambak, Manisra, Manim, Manimbu, Marbuan, Matapum, Mafiti, Makui, Majiwi, Matami, Macibi, Neori, Nubuab, Pasosi, Rumbesu, Wabia, Warijo, Wasabiti, Wanyopi, Wadoki
Nerigo	Trans-New Guinea	Sorong Selatan	Matemani District: Mugim (Nusa) village	Abago, Ambuwew, Bawey, Biame, Budji, Dahur, Dorowe, Ebar, Haupar, Kena, Kebibe, Kikire, Magme, Makona, Muratan, Maituman, Paur, Subay
Tehit	West Bird's Head	Sorong Selatan		Tehit Mlafle, Tehit Mlakya, Tehit Konda, Tehit Nakna, Tehit Imian, Tehit Nasfa, Tehit Ogit / Yaben, Tehit Srer, Tehit Imian Slaya, Tehit Imian Salmit Klawsa, Tehit Salmi Klawsa, Tehit Mla Flassi, Tehit Mla Srit, Tehit Wakya, Tehit Gemna, Tehit Sfa
Tepin	Austronesian	Raja Ampat	north coast of Salawati Island, in Samate District: Kalian and Solol villages	
Waili	Austronesian	Raja Ampat	Salawati Island: Samate, Kapatlap, Kalobo, and Sakabu villages	
Wawiyai (Ma'ya)	Austronesian	Raja Ampat	Waigeo Selatan District: Wawiyai village	Dam, Dayolong, Fei, Gaman, Gilipin, Gamsoi, Gaitim, Gimia, Kapatlot, Kapatsai, Lagat, Marindal, Waigayom, Wawiyai
Wayer	Maybrat	South Sorong	Moswaren District and Wayer District	
Yaban Nerigo		Sorong Selatan	Kais District: Yahadian village	Ginuni, Ginuni-Rumakoy, Ginuni-Yaban, Ginuni-Nitobihar, Regoy-Kaikur, Regoy-Dahur
Yabin Konda	Trans-New Guinea	Sorong Selatan	Konda District: Wamargege and Konda villages	Begrey, Girio, Kasminya, Kemeray, Kofari, Mambruaru, Micibaru, Meres, Mondar, Oname, Ongomsaru, Osen, Oseli, Pomsaru, Rumsaro, Serio, Segeitmena, Simat, Sianggo, Sibaru, Slabaru, Segeit, Timjaru, Temaru

== See also ==
- List of ethnic groups of West Papua
- Indigenous people of New Guinea
- Ethnic groups in Indonesia
- Southwest Papua
- List of districts of Southwest Papua
- Southwest Papuan languages
