= Kemberano language =

Papuan language

Kemberano
- Weriagar, Barau
- Native to: West Papua, Indonesia
- Region: Bird's Head Peninsula, New Guinea
- Native speakers: (2,500 including Dombano (possibly double counting) cited 1987)
- Language family: Trans–New Guinea?: Berau Gulf; South Bird's Head; Nuclear/East; Kokoda–Arandai; Arandai; Kemberano

Language codes
- ISO 639-3: bzp
- Glottolog: kemb1235
- Coordinates: 2.24°S 132.99°E

Kemberano is a Papuan language of the Bird's Head Peninsula of West Papua, Indonesia. It is considered "endangered" by Ethnologue.

== Geographic distribution ==
Kemberano is a member of the Trans–New Guinea languages, spoken on the northwestern corner of the island of New Guinea. It is a member of the South Bird's Head languages, which are spoken on the south side of the Bird's Head peninsula in Indonesia, along the shore of the Berau Gulf. Its speakers are mostly located along the northern coast of the gulf, although some of Kemberano speakers have moved across the gulf to the north side of the Bomberai Peninsula, living in a village called Otoweri.

Kemberano is closely related to its two neighboring languages, Dombano and Kokoda, forming either a subfamily of languages or a three-member dialect continuum called Arandai.

== Phonology ==
Consonants
		Labial	Dental/ Alveolar	Palatal	Velar
Plosive/ Affricate	voiceless	p	t̪		k
Plosive/ Affricate	prenasal/vd.	ᵐb~b	ⁿ̪d̪~d̪	dʑ	ᵑɡ~ɡ
Fricative		β	ð		ɣ
Nasal		m	n		
Flap			ɾ		
Glide		(w)		(j)	

Prenasal sounds /ᵐb, ⁿ̪d̪, ᵑɡ/ are mostly heard as prenasal in word-initial position and as voiced stops [b, d̪, ɡ] elsewhere.

- /ᵑɡ ~ ɡ/ can be heard as [ŋ] when the next consonant in a word is /ᵑɡ ~ ɡ/ or /n/.
- Stop sounds /p, k/ can also be heard as affricated sounds [pᶠ, kˣ] in free variation.
- Fricatives /β, ð, ɣ/ can also be heard as unarticulated voiced stops [b̚, d̪̚, ɡ̚] when in word-final position.
- Glides [w, j] occur as a result of vowels /i, u/ when preceding other vowels, or when in intervocalic positions.

Vowels
	Front	Central	Back
High	i	u	
Mid	e	(ə)	o
Low		a	

The five vowels /i, e, a, o, u/ can be heard as [ɪ, ɛ, ɑ, ɔ, ʊ] in unstressed positions. All of them may also be heard as a mid central [ə] in free variation in unstressed positions.

- /a/ can be heard as [æ] when within the vicinity of /i/.
- /i/ can be heard as [y] when within the vicinity of /u/.

== Morphology ==
Kemberano nouns are required to have the following concord suffixes:

- –i (masculine nouns)
- –o (feminine nouns)

Examples (from Berry and Berry 1987: 86):

pogi enat-i
pig one-M
‘one pig’

uroko enat-o
stone one-F
‘one stone’
