= List of language families =

This article is a list of language families. This list only includes primary language families that are accepted by the current academic consensus in the field of linguistics; for language families that are not accepted by the current academic consensus in the field of linguistics, see the article "List of proposed language families".

== List of language families ==
=== Spoken language families ===
Traditional geographical classification (not implying genetic relationship)
Legend
Andamanese languages
Australian languages and Tasmanian languages
Caucasian languages
Khoisan languages
Nuba Mountains languages
Paleo-Siberian languages
Papuan languages

Family	Languages	Current speakers	Location
Afroasiatic	381	499,294,669	Africa, Eurasia
Aroid	5	438,100	Africa
Atlantic–Congo	1,410	500,000,000	Africa
Berta	6	380,000	Africa
Central Sudanic	63	9,145,280	Africa
Daju	7	261,000	Africa
Dizoid	3	88,840	Africa
Dogon	20	630,820	Africa
Eastern Jebel	4	104,600	Africa
Fur	2	786,900	Africa
Gumuz	3	253,680	Africa
Heiban	10	276,690	Africa
Ijaw	9	3,221,650	Africa
Kadu	6	120,600	Africa
Katla-Tima	3	25,000	Africa
Khoe-Kwadi	14	337,337	Africa
Koman	5	94,000	Africa
Kresh-Aja	3	48,200	Africa
Kru	38	3,800,000	Africa
Kuliak	3	14,070	Africa
Kunama	2	181,000	Africa
Kxʼa	5	104,000	Africa
Maban	10	1,115,260	Africa
Mande	75	27,003,000	Africa
Nilotic	55	33,306,780	Africa
Nubian	13	842,050	Africa
Nyima	2	162,000	Africa
Rashad	2	126,000	Africa
Saharan	10	10,940,500	Africa
Songhay	10	3,228,000	Africa
Surmic	11	544,680	Africa
Talodi	8	112,250	Africa
Taman	4	128,800	Africa
Ta-Ne-Omotic	23	7,383,320	Africa
Temein	2	14,400	Africa
Tuu	9	2,500	Africa
Zande	6	1,898,500	Africa
Indo-European	586	3,237,999,904	Global
Uralic	49	20,716,457	Eurasia
Tyrsenian	3 or 4	extinct	Eurasia
Turkic	35	179,945,933	Eurasia
Hurro-Urartian	2	extinct	Eurasia
Northwest Caucasian	4	1,655,000	Eurasia
Northeast Caucasian	29	4,155,258	Eurasia
Kartvelian	4	4,850,000	Eurasia
Dravidian	84	252,807,610	Eurasia
Great Andamanese	10	3	Eurasia
Ongan	2	296	Eurasia
Yeniseian	6	153	Eurasia
Yukaghir	4	516	Eurasia
Sino-Tibetan	514	1,385,995,195	Eurasia
Mijiic	2	29,500	Eurasia
Hmong–Mien	43	9,332,070	Eurasia
Kra–Dai	95	81,549,828	Eurasia
Austroasiatic	158	116,323,040	Eurasia
Austronesian	1,274	325,862,510	Africa, Eurasia, Oceania
Tungusic	15	55,800	Eurasia
Mongolic	16	7,269,480	Eurasia
Koreanic	2	77,269,890	Eurasia
Nivkh	2	200	Eurasia
Japonic	13	129,240,180	Eurasia
Ainu	3	moribund	Eurasia
Chukotko-Kamchatkan	7	6,875	Eurasia
Trans–New Guinea	376	3,678,184	New Guinea
Torricelli	57	114,565	New Guinea
Sepik	49	263,404	New Guinea
Lower Sepik	6	13,070	New Guinea
Timor–Alor–Pantar	23	380,120	Lesser Sunda Islands
Lakes Plain	20	8,455	New Guinea
Yam	19	7,677	New Guinea
Anim	17	32,898	New Guinea
Border	15	17,080	New Guinea
North Halmahera	15	279,035	Halmahera
Angan	13	103,739	New Guinea
Geelvink Bay	10	8,005	New Guinea
Sko	10	5,665	New Guinea
South Bougainville	9	68,700	New Guinea
Baining	6	13,800	New Guinea
Strickland	8	6,175	New Guinea
Goilalan	6	47,330	New Guinea
Kiwaia	6	38,030	New Guinea
Left May	6	2,005	New Guinea
South Bird's Head	6	8,200	New Guinea
Eleman	5	45,240	New Guinea
Foja Range	26	23,845	New Guinea
Pauwasi	5	3,880	New Guinea
West Bird's Head	5	20,090	New Guinea
Yuat	5	7,700	New Guinea
Eastern Trans-Fly	4	6,760	New Guinea
North Bougainville	4	10,020	New Guinea
Demta–Sentani	4	36,680	New Guinea
Gogodala–Suki	4	30,160	New Guinea
Kikorian	6	13,510	New Guinea
Walio	4	856	New Guinea
East Bird's Head	3	34,800	New Guinea
Mairasi	3	4,385	New Guinea
Amto–Musan	2	720	New Guinea
Baibai-Fas	2	2,840	New Guinea
Bulaka River	3	520	New Guinea
Hatam-Mansim	2	16,000	New Guinea
Inanwatan–Duriankere	2	1,130	New Guinea
Kaure-Kosare	2	700	New Guinea
Konda-Yahadian	2	1,000	New Guinea
Senu River	3	1,510	New Guinea
Lepki-Murkim-Kembra	3	840	New Guinea
Namla-Tofanma	2	280	New Guinea
Pahoturi	2	4,050	New Guinea
Madang–Upper Yuat	112	142,080	New Guinea
Senagi	2	2,960	New Guinea
Taulil-Butam	2	2,000	New Guinea
Ramu	29	64,730	New Guinea
Teberan–Pawaian	4	37,100	New Guinea
Yawa-Saweru	2	10,300	New Guinea
Central Solomon	4	14,800	New Guinea
Chimbu-Wahgi	15	613,400	New Guinea
Engan	9	606,930	New Guinea
Pama–Nyungan	250	23,539	Australia
Gunwinyguan	5	1,314	Australia
Western Daly	3	21	Australia
Nyulnyulan	3	94	Australia
Worrorran	3	108	Australia
Mirndi	3	261	Australia
Iwaidjan	4	491	Australia
Mangarrayi-Maran	4	10	Australia
Maningrida	4	1,434	Australia
Tangkic	4	73	Australia
Jarrakan	3	130	Australia
Bunuban	2	100	Australia
Eastern Daly	2	extinct	Australia
Garrwan	2	130	Australia
Limilngan-Wulna	2	23	Australia
Marrku-Wurrugu	2	extinct	Australia
Northeastern Tasmanian	2	extinct	Australia
Northern Daly	2	8	Australia
Southeastern Tasmanian	2	extinct	Australia
Western Tasmanian	2	extinct	Australia
Northern Tasmanian	2	extinct	Australia
Eskaleut	10	108,705	North America, Eurasia
Na-Dene	46	208,552	North America
Tsimshianic	4	2,910	North America
Wakashan	6	710	North America
Salishan	25	1,969	North America
Chimakuan	2	extinct	North America
Chinookan	4	extinct	North America
Kalapuyan	3	extinct	North America
Coosan	2	extinct	North America
Plateau	4	125	North America
Shastan	4	extinct	North America
Comecrudan	3	extinct	North America
Yuki–Wappo	2	extinct	North America
Pomoan	7	47	North America
Wintuan	2	extinct	North America
Palaihnihan	2	extinct	North America
Maiduan	4	extinct	North America
Utian	13	18	North America
Chumashan	6	extinct	North America
Uto-Aztecan	58	1,910,442	North America
Yuman–Cochimí	12	3,710	North America
Siouan	14	33,399	North America
Algic	47	214,768	North America
Tanoan–Kiowa	6	6,000	North America
Caddoan	5	20	North America
Totonacan	12	282,250	North America
Oto-Manguean	176	1,678,214	North America
Mixe–Zoque	17	153,612	North America
Tequistlatecan	3	5,494	North America
Muskogean	6	15,640	North America
Mayan	31	6,522,182	North America
Xincan	5	extinct	North America
Jicaquean	2	500	North America
Lencan	2	extinct	North America
Misumalpan	5	709,000	North America
Iroquoian	9	14,543	North America
Arawakan	77	699,709	North America, South America
Chibchan	27	306,267	North America, South America
Chocoan	9	114,600	North America, South America
Andoque–Urequena	2	370	South America
Cariban	42	67,376	North America, South America
Barbacoan	6	24,800	South America
Chicham	4	89,630	South America
Quechuan	45	7,768,820	South America
Aymaran	4	2,808,740	South America
Uru–Chipaya	2	1,200	South America
Huarpean	3	extinct	South America
Araucanian	2	262,000	South America
Chonan	6	extinct	South America
Alacalufan	3	10	South America
Guajiboan	5	39,290	South America
Nukak–Kakwa	2	610	South America
Otomákoan	2	extinct	South America
Piaroa–Saliban	3	18,630	South America
Nadahup	4	2,894	South America
Yanomaman	4	31,670	South America
Tucanoan	23	30,308	South America
Boran	2	1,500	South America
Witotoan	7	17,478	South America
Peba–Yaguan	3	5,700	South America
Zaparoan	3	90	South America
Hibito–Cholon	2	extinct	South America
Cahuapanan	2	10,370	South America
Ticuna–Yuri	2	48,580	South America
Panoan	38	48,679	South America
Arawan	6	5,870	South America
Harákmbut–Katukinan	4	3,310	South America
Tupian	70	5,026,502	South America
Chapacuran	4	2,019	South America
Nambikwaran	6	1,068	South America
Bororoan	3	1,392	South America
Kariri	4	extinct	South America
Zamucoan	2	5,900	South America
Tacanan	7	2,860	South America
Mascoian	6	20,728	South America
Matacoan	7	60,280	South America
Guaicuruan	4	49,350	South America
Macro-Jê	29	51,093	South America
Charruan	3	extinct	South America
Purian	2	extinct	South America
Puquina	4	extinct	South America
Cañari–Puruhá	2	extinct	South America
Jirajaran	3	extinct	South America
Lule-Vilela	2	extinct	South America
Timotean	2	extinct	South America
Tiniguan	3	1	South America

=== Sign language families ===
The family relationships of sign languages are not well established due to lagging linguistic research, and many are isolates (cf. Wittmann 1991).

Family Name	Location	Number of
French Sign	Europe, the Americas, Francophone Africa, parts of Asia	Over 50
British Sign	United Kingdom, Australia, New Zealand, South Africa	4–10
Arab Sign	Much of the Arab World	6–10
Japanese Sign	Japan, Korea, Taiwan	3
German Sign	Germany, Poland, Israel	3
Swedish Sign	Sweden, Finland, Portugal	3
Chinese Sign	China (including Hong Kong and Macau)	2

=== Maps of several language families ===
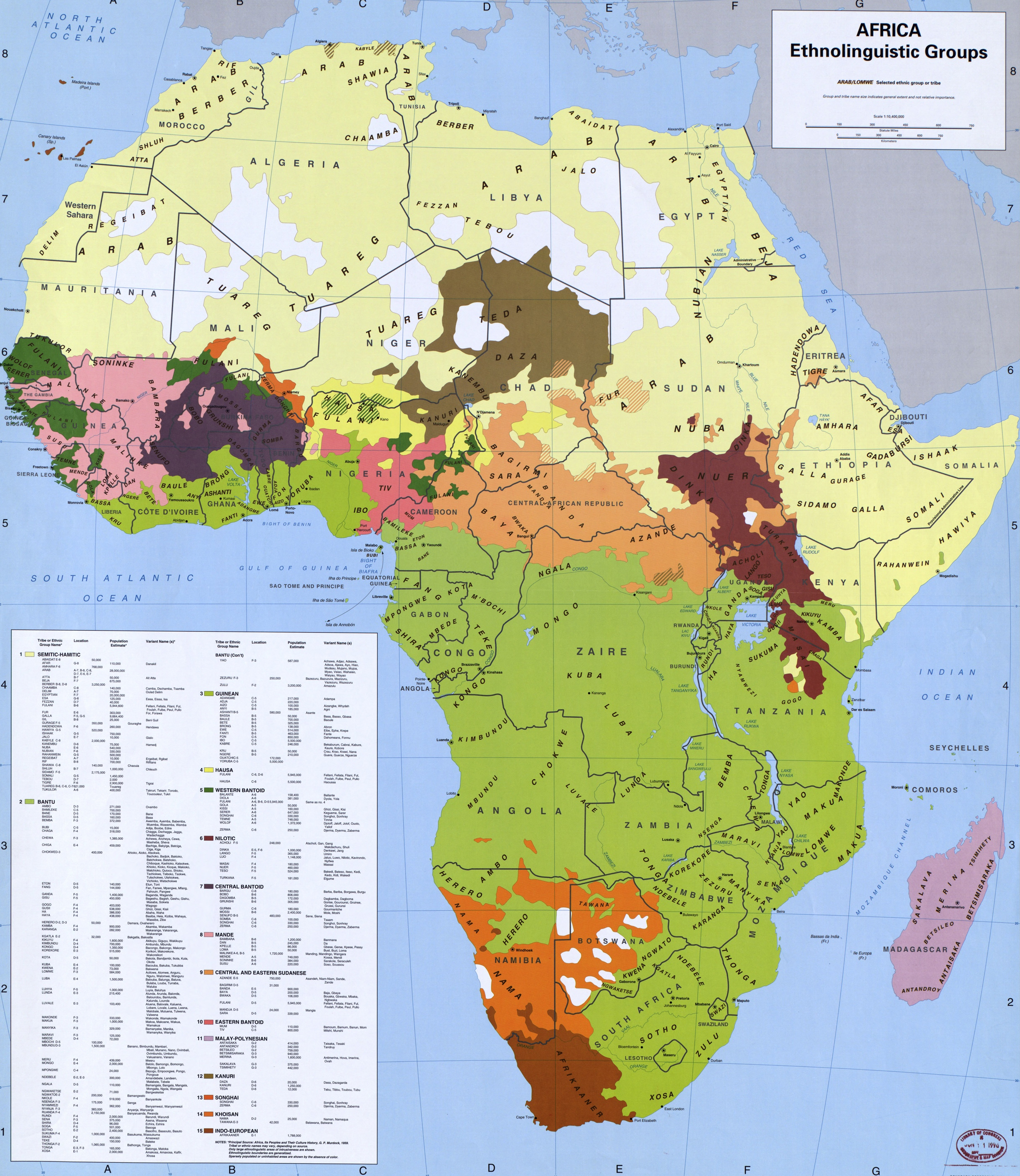
The language families of Africa

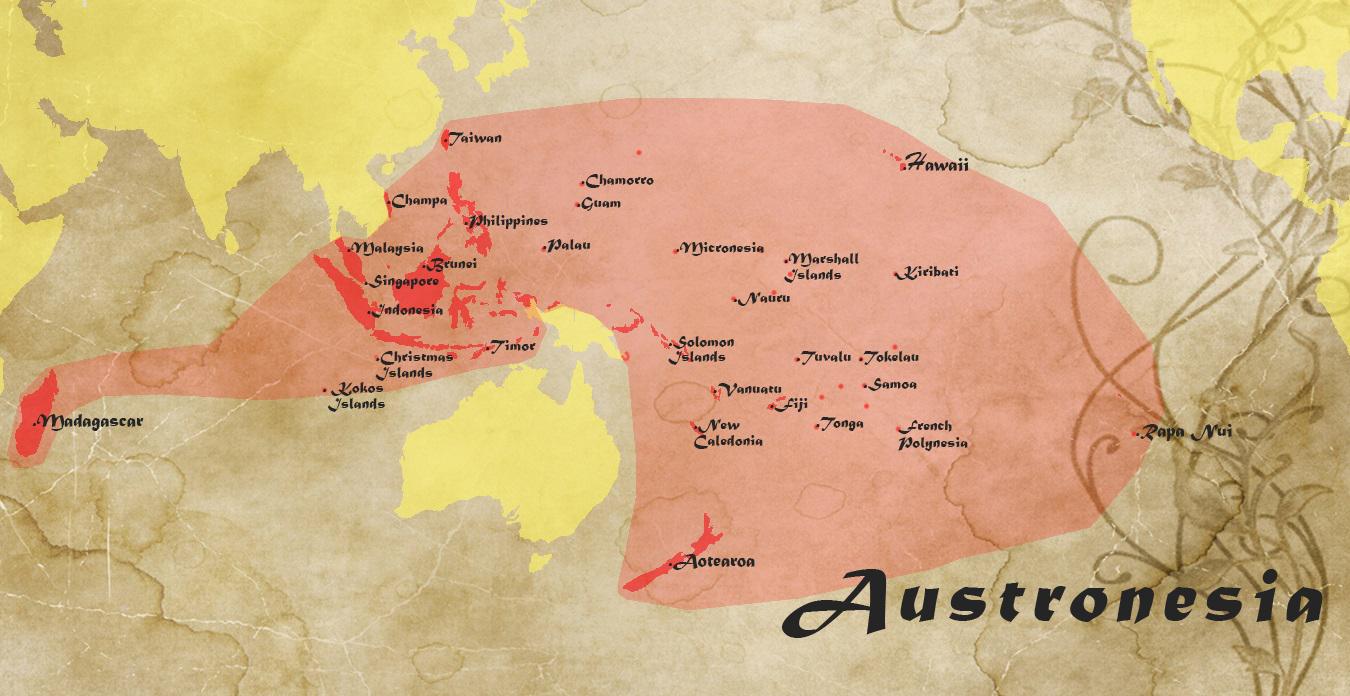
Map of the Austronesian languages

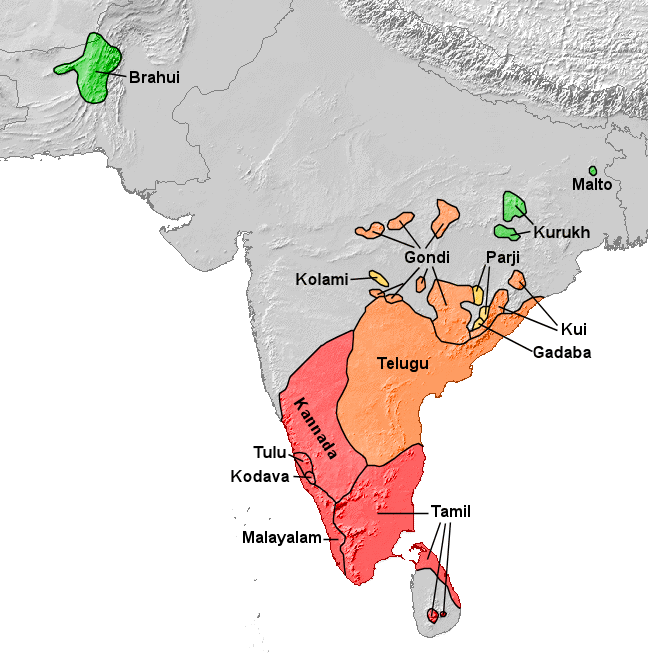
Map of major Dravidian languages

Distribution of the Indo-European language family branches across Eurasia

Area of the Papuan languages

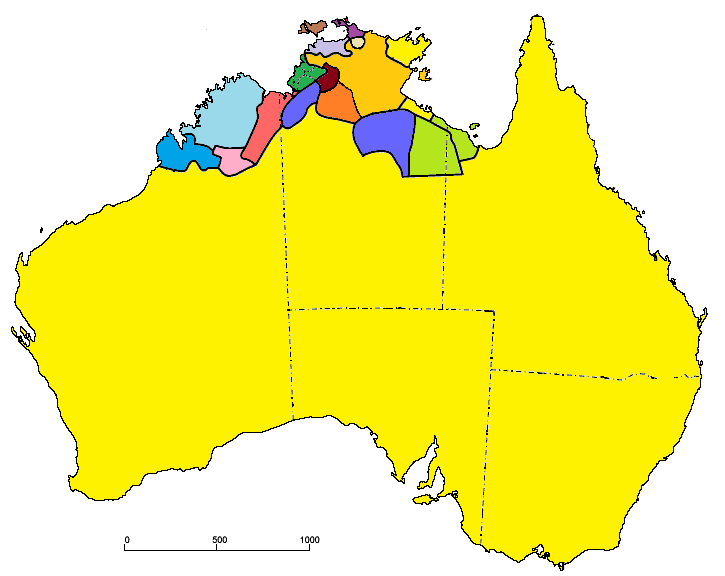
Map of the Australian languages

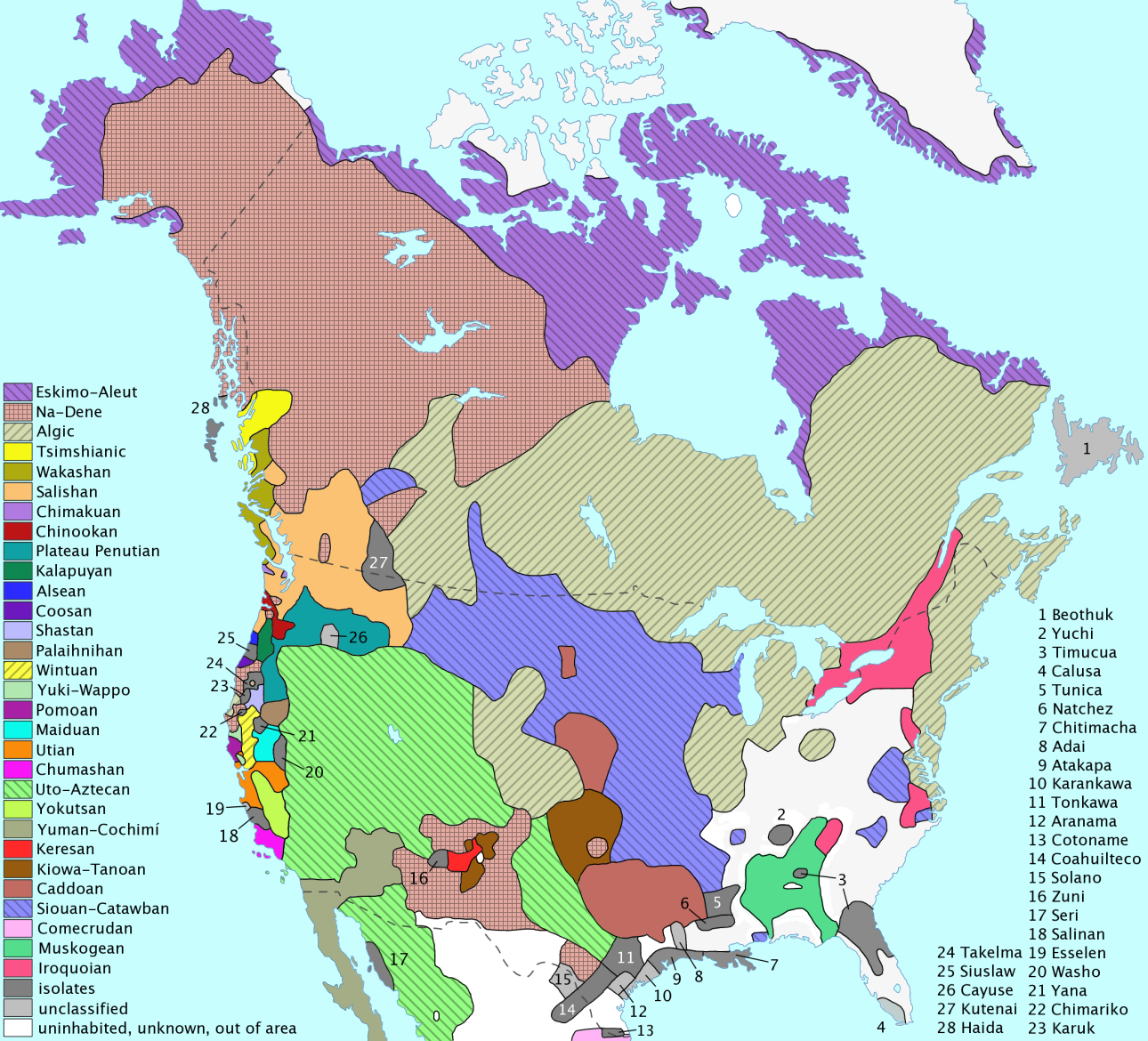
Distribution of language families and isolates north of Mexico at first contact

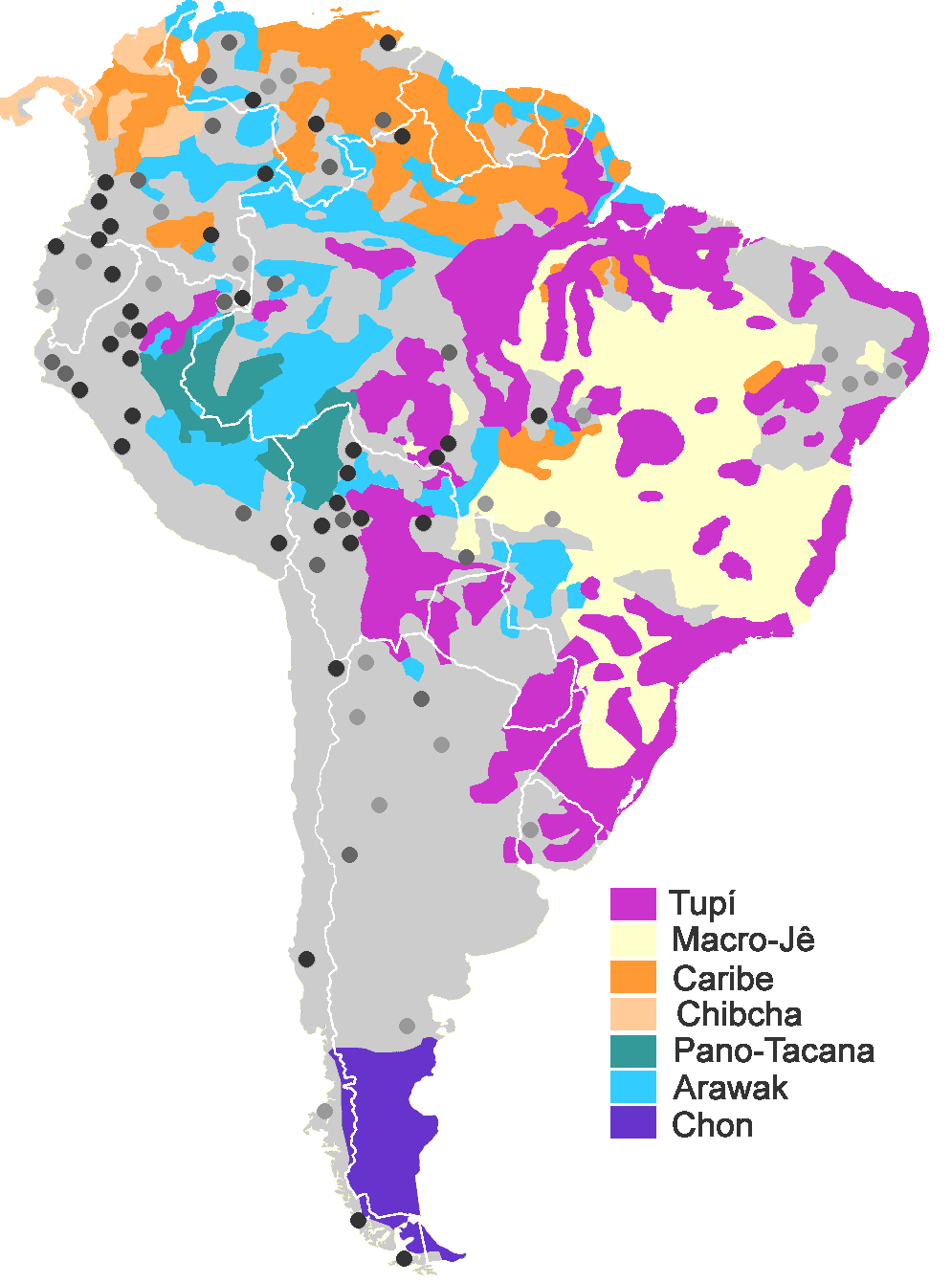
The major South American language families

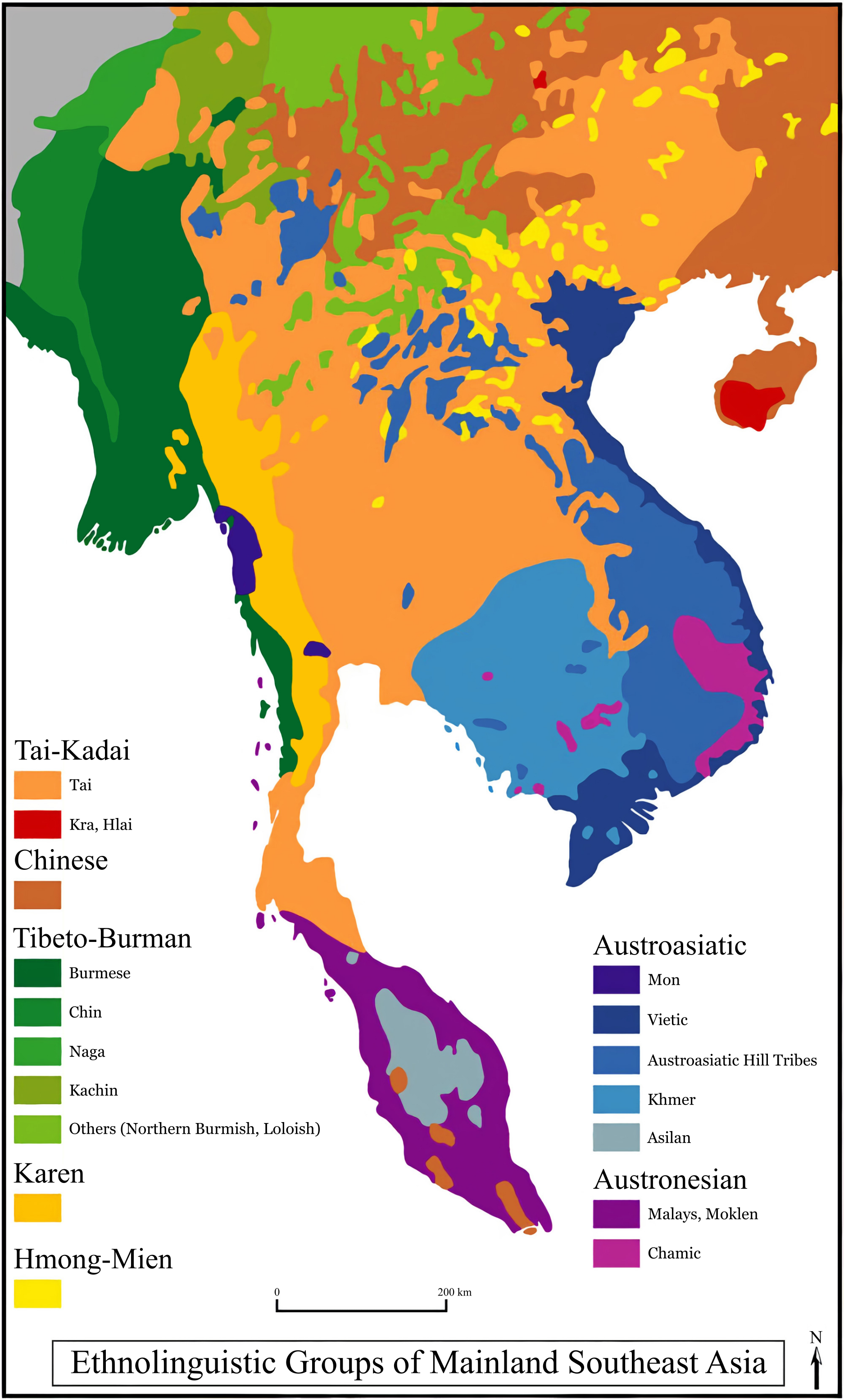
Ethnolinguistic groups of mainland Southeast Asia

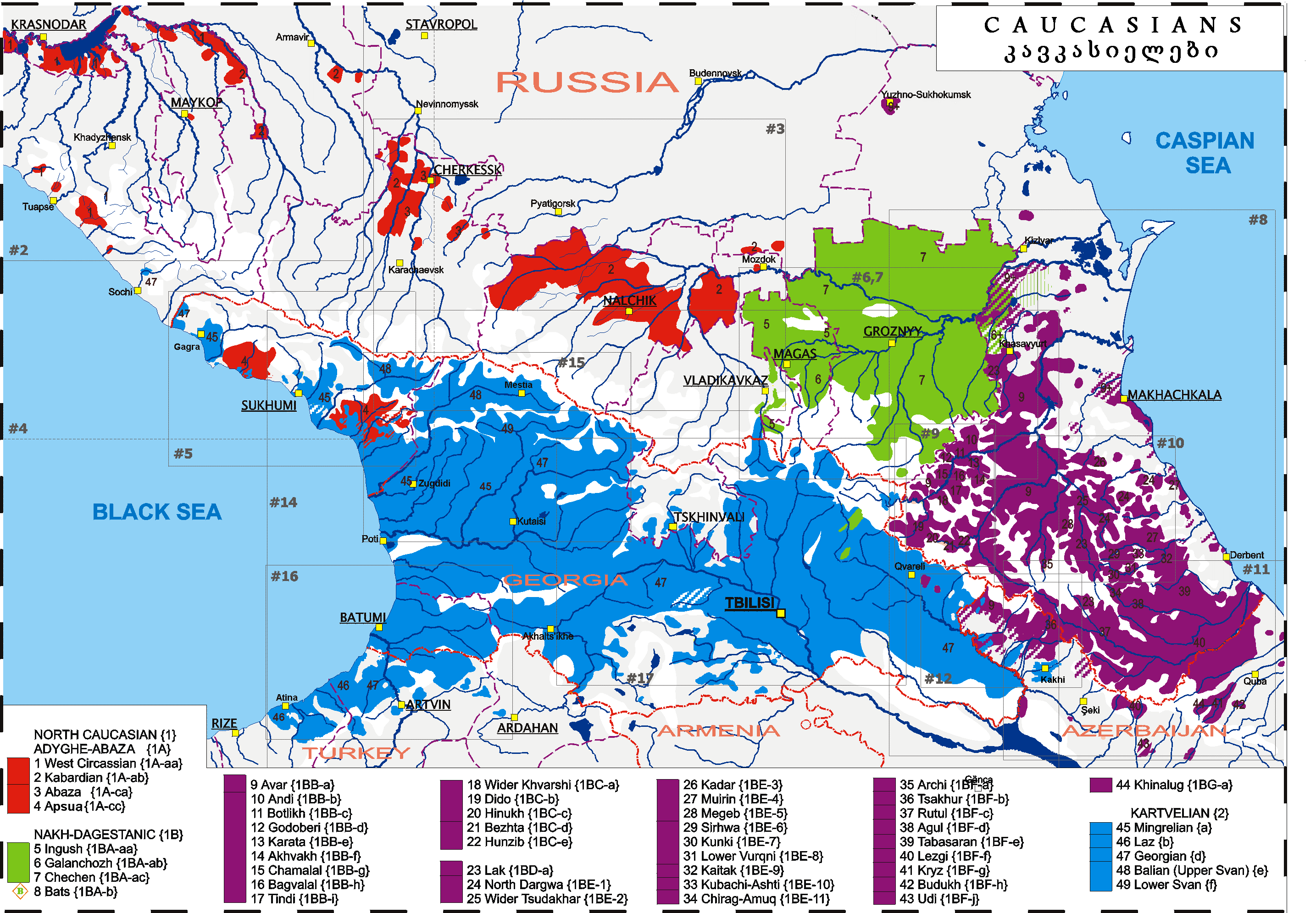
Caucasian languages

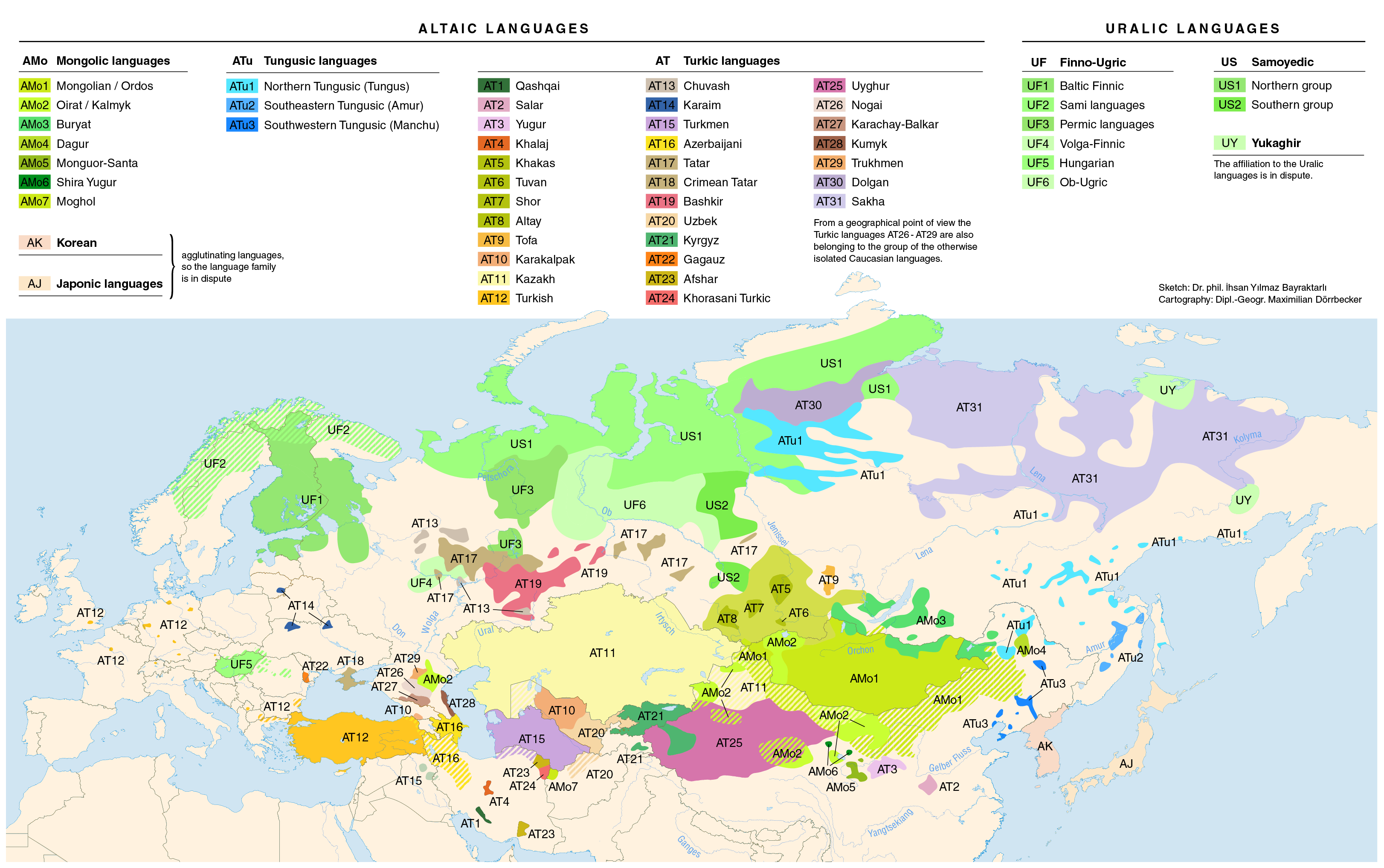
Distribution of the Uralic, Altaic, and Yukaghir languages

Approximate pre-contact distribution of language families in and near Mesoamerica

== See also ==
- Constructed language – Intentionally devised human language
- Endangered language – Language that is at risk of going extinct
- Ethnologue § Language families
- Extinct language – Language with no living native speakers
- Index of language articles
- Intercontinental Dictionary Series – Linguistics database
- International auxiliary language – Constructed language meant to facilitate communication
- Glottolog § Language families
- Language isolate § List of language isolates by continent
- Lists of languages
- List of proposed language families
- Unclassified language

== Bibliography ==
- Boas, Franz. (1911). Handbook of American Indian languages (Vol. 1). Bureau of American Ethnology, Bulletin 40. Washington: Government Print Office (Smithsonian Institution, Bureau of American Ethnology).
- Boas, Franz. (1922). Handbook of American Indian languages (Vol. 2). Bureau of American Ethnology, Bulletin 40. Washington: Government Print Office (Smithsonian Institution, Bureau of American Ethnology).
- Boas, Franz. (1933). Handbook of American Indian languages (Vol. 3). Native American legal materials collection, title 1227. Glückstadt: J.J. Augustin.
- Campbell, Lyle. (1997). American Indian languages: The historical linguistics of Native America. New York: Oxford University Press. ISBN 0-19-509427-1.
- Campbell, Lyle; & Mithun, Marianne (Eds.). (1979). The languages of native America: Historical and comparative assessment. Austin: University of Texas Press.
- Goddard, Ives (Ed.). (1996). Languages. Handbook of North American Indians (W. C. Sturtevant, General Ed.) (Vol. 17). Washington, D. C.: Smithsonian Institution. ISBN 0-16-048774-9.
- Goddard, Ives. (1999). Native languages and language families of North America (rev. and enlarged ed. with additions and corrections). [Map]. Lincoln, NE: University of Nebraska Press (Smithsonian Institution). (Updated version of the map in Goddard 1996). ISBN 0-8032-9271-6.
- Gordon, Raymond G., Jr. (Ed.). (2005). Ethnologue: Languages of the world (15th ed.). Dallas, TX: SIL International. ISBN 1-55671-159-X. (Online version: http://www.ethnologue.com).
- Greenberg, Joseph H. (1966). The Languages of Africa (2nd ed.). Bloomington: Indiana University.
- Mithun, Marianne. (1999). The languages of Native North America. Cambridge: Cambridge University Press. ISBN 0-521-23228-7 (hbk); ISBN 0-521-29875-X.
- Ross, Malcolm. (2005). Pronouns as a preliminary diagnostic for grouping Papuan languages. In: Andrew Pawley, Robert Attenborough, Robin Hide and Jack Golson, eds, Papuan pasts: cultural, linguistic and biological histories of Papuan-speaking peoples
- Ruhlen, Merritt. (1987). A guide to the world's languages. Stanford: Stanford University Press.
- Sturtevant, William C. (Ed.). (1978–present). Handbook of North American Indians (Vol. 1–20). Washington, D. C.: Smithsonian Institution. (Vols. 1–3, 16, 18–20 not yet published).
- Voegelin, C. F.; & Voegelin, F. M. (1977). Classification and index of the world's languages. New York: Elsevier.
- Wittmann, Henri (1991). "Classification linguistique des langues signées non vocalement." Revue québécoise de linguistique théorique et appliquée 10:1.215-88.
