= Nuclear South Bird's Head languages =

Language family of western New Guinea

Nuclear South Bird's Head
- East South Bird's Head
- Geographic distribution: Bird's Head Peninsula, Indonesian Papua
- Linguistic classification: ? Trans–New Guinea: ? Berau Gulf; ? South Bird's Head; Nuclear South Bird's Head

Language codes
- Glottolog: sout1516

The Nuclear South Bird's Head, Core South Bird's Head or East South Bird's Head languages form a small language family of western New Guinea. They either form part of a wider South Bird's Head language family, or may be an independent language family if not related to the Inanwatan and Konda–Yahadian languages.

== Languages ==
There are six languages:

- East South Bird's Head
  - Kais (Kampong Baru)
  - Iwaro–Kaburi
    - Kaburi (Awe–Mareno)
    - Puragi (Iwaro)
  - Kokoda–Arandai
    - Kokoda (Tarof, Kasuweri)
    - Arandai
      - Kemberano (Weriagar, Barau)
      - Dombano (Tomu)

== Proto-language ==
Some lexical reconstructions by Usher (2020) are:

gloss	Proto-East South Bird's Head
body hair/feather	*karar
ear	*qer[aw]
nose	*mitob
tooth	*resin
tongue	*nun
foot/leg	*sor
blood	*a[m/p]as
bone	*toq
breast	*did
louse	*kon
bird	*kanen
egg	*wuk
tree	*qemin
man	*rabin
sun	*teg[ed]
moon	*mo[k/q]
water	*sai
path	*aum
one	*onat
two	*[ou]g
