= Suabo language =

Papuan language of West Papua

Suabo
- Inanwatan
- Native to: Southwest Papua, Indonesia
- Region: Inanwatan District, South Sorong Regency in the Bird's Head Peninsula
- Ethnicity: Inanwatan
- Native speakers: 800 (2004)
- Language family: Trans–New Guinea?: Berau Gulf; South Bird's Head?; Inanwatan–Duriankere; Suabo

Language codes
- ISO 639-3: szp
- Glottolog: suab1238
- ELP: Suabo
- Coordinates: 2.08°S 132.16°E

The Suabo or Inanwatan is a Papuan language of Southwest Papua. It is often classified in the South Bird's Head language family, but may alternatively form an independent language family together with Duriankere.

== Overview ==
Inanwatan is primarily spoken in the village of Inanwatan, South Sorong Regency on the south coast of the Bird's Head Peninsula, but also in the village of Seget, Sorong Regency on the western tip of the peninsula, as well as by a community in the Jalan Ferry area of the city of Sorong.

Inanwatan is endangered: de Vries reports in 2004 that it was mostly people over 50 years of age who speak it fluently, and that the newest generation do not know it. According to his estimate, Inanwatan has 800 or fewer speakers, out of an ethnic population of about 3,000. The language is not a central component of the identity of the people, who identify more strongly with the smaller descent groups.

The language is also known under the names Bira, Suabo, Iagu and Mirabo, while the Inanwatan themselves most commonly refer to it as nidáibo 'our language'. It is most closely related to the Duriankari language.

== Phonology ==
Consonants
	Labial	Alveolar	Palatal	Velar	Glottal
Plosive	p b	t d		k g	ʔ ⟨q⟩
Fricative	ɸ ⟨f⟩	s			
Nasal	m	n			
Approximant	(w~β) ⟨w⟩	(r)	j ⟨y⟩		

- The consonant /n/ has the allophone [r] intervocalically.
- The consonant /ɸ/ has the allophones [w] between any vowel and any back vowel /o/ or /u/, and [β] between any vowel and any non-back vowel.

Vowels
	Front	Central	Back
High	i		u
Mid	e		o
Low		a	

- The vowels /e/ and /a/ are, rarely, reduced to [ə] in unstressed syllables.

Additionally, the following diphthongs are present: /ai/, /ae/, /au/, /ao/, /ou/.

Stress is phonemic and unpredictable.

== Grammar ==
Like the Romance languages, Inanwatan distinguishes masculine and feminine grammatical genders. Inanwatan masculine nouns end in the front vowels -i and -e, and feminine nouns end in non-front vowels -u, -o, -a. Maybrat, on the other hand, uses concord prefixes instead of suffixes to mark gender.

Inanwatan nouns usually have lexically determined gender, but some of the nouns allow for choice of gender via varying gender suffixes:

- áruqe ‘blood of a male’
- áruqo ‘blood of a female’

Inanwatan feminine forms are homophonous with plural forms, while masculine forms are distinct.

== Bibliography ==
- Holton, Gary; Klamer, Marian (2018). "The Papuan languages of East Nusantara and the Bird's Head". In Palmer, Bill (ed.). The Languages and Linguistics of the New Guinea Area: A Comprehensive Guide. The World of Linguistics. Vol. 4. Berlin: De Gruyter Mouton. pp. 569–640. ISBN 978-3-11-028642-7.
- Remijsen, Albert Clementina Ludovicus (2001). Word-prosodic systems of Raja Ampat languages. Utrecht: LOT. ISBN 978-90-76864-09-9.
- Vries, L. J. de (2004). A short grammar of Inanwatan. An endangered language of the Bird's Head of Papua, Indonesia. Australian National University Press. ISBN 978-0-85883-545-0.
