= Mogetemin language =

Mogetemin (Mogotemin) may be:

- Mai Brat language or Ayamaru language, spoken by the Ayamaru people in the many villages around the Ayamaru Lakes on the Bird's Head Peninsula of West Papua
- Konda language (Papuan) or Ogit, Yabin, the westernmost mainland Trans–New Guinea language
