= Yahadian language =

Yabin language spoken in Indonesia

Yahadian
- Yahadian-Mugim
- Native to: Southwest Papua, Indonesia
- Region: Kampung Yahadian, Kais District and Kampung Mugim, Matemani District, South Sorong Regency in the Bird's Head Peninsula
- Native speakers: 1,200 (2002)
- Language family: Trans–New Guinea: ? South Bird's Head; Konda–Yahadian; Yahadian

Language codes
- ISO 639-3: ner
- Glottolog: yaha1248
- Coordinates: 1.94°S 132.10°E

Yahadian is a Papuan language of the Bird's Head Peninsula of Southwest Papua. It is spoken in Yahadian village, Kais District, South Sorong Regency. Overall, Yahadian is poorly documented, with only enough data for a sketch of the language's structure. It is considered "endangered" by Ethnologue.

== Geographic distribution ==
Yahadian is a member of the Trans–New Guinea languages, spoken on the northwestern corner of the island of New Guinea. Three villages speak Yahadian: Mugim, Yahadian, and (parts of) Kais, with an estimated 1,200 speakers in 2002. They are all located on the south side of the Bird's Head peninsula in Indonesia.

Yahadian is most closely related to Konda; the two languages appear to form a dialect continuum. Yahadian speakers in the village of Mugim reported that they could "easily" understand Konda speakers. They are also the only two South Bird's Head languages that do not mark gender on nouns.

It does not appear to have a close relationship with its eastern neighbor, the Inanwatan language, with limited lexical overlap (8%) and far different phonology and morphology.

== Phonology ==
=== Consonants ===
Yahadian has 21 consonants, according to de Vries's analysis.

Yahadian consonants
	Bilabial		Alveolar		Palato-alveolar		Palatal		Velar		Labiovelar	Glottal
Plosive	p	b	t	d	tʲ	dʲ (Note: de Vries writes the palato-alveolar plosives in IPA as if they were affricates, but still considers them plosives.)	c	ɟ	k	ɡ		
Fricative	ɸ	β							x	ɣ		h
Nasal		m		n						ŋ		
Tap/ Trill				ɾ r (Note: de Vries marks these phonemes as members of the same category but counts them as separate phonemes to reach the total of 21)								
Approximant											w	

=== Vowels ===
Yahadian has eight vowels:

Yahadian vowels
	Front	Central	Back
	unrounded	unrounded	rounded
Close	i		u
Close-mid	e		o
Open-mid	ɛ	ə	ɔ
Open		a	

=== Phonotactics ===
The language generally uses CV or V syllables, with a few exceptions. CC consonant clusters require one of the consonants to be [r] or [t]. Nasals and liquids are the only observed word-final consonants.

== Morphology ==
Yahadian has fairly simple morphology compared to its neighbors. It does not index the verb's arguments via affixes, unlike other South Bird's Head languages.

== Pronouns ==
Gender is not known to be marked in Yahadian. De Vries reports the following pronouns for Yahadian:

	singular	plural
1st person	né(nigi)	ná(gigi)
2nd person	é(rigi)	ádigi/adʒigi
3rd person	mí(gigi)	míginaigi
