= Duriankari language =

Extinct language of Indonesia

Duriankari
- Duriankere, Efpan
- Native to: Indonesia
- Region: Salawati, Sorong Regency, Southwest Papua
- Ethnicity: Duriankari people
- Extinct: by 1994
- Language family: ? South Bird's Head: Inanwatan–Duriankere; Duriankari

Language codes
- ISO 639-3: dbn
- Glottolog: duri1243
- ELP: Duriankere
- Coordinates: 1.36°S 130.94°E

Duriankari (or Duriankere) is an extinct Papuan language (or dialect) of Indonesian Papua. It is associated with the Duriankari people of the eponymous village situated at the southern tip of the island of Salawati, which is part of the Raja Ampat Archipelago and is adjacent to the Bird's Head Peninsula of the West Papuan mainland.

It was observed in the 1950s that its speakers were shifting to the Moi language. Duriankari was reported in the 1980s to have had about 100 speakers, but in 1994, it was said by the nearby Inanwatan people to be extinct. It was listed as a separate language by Voorhoeve (1975a, p. 440), but Berry & Berry (1987, p. 92) conclude that not enough is known about it to determine whether it is a separate language or a dialect of Inanwatan. The Inanwatan language is spoken in a few villages over 150 kilometres to the east (as well as by a smaller community across the Sele Strait from Duriankari in the village of Seget). The Inanwatan people there regard the Duriankari people as descendants of Inanwatans who were carried away so far west by a mythical flood.

A list of words in the language collected by J.C. Anceaux is available in Voorhoeve (1975b, p. 104) and Smits & Voorhoeve (1998).

== Vocabulary ==
Duriankere vocabulary
gloss	Duriankere
arm	memo
ashes	bunakak-o
bird	dorimo

== Bibliography ==
- Berry, Keith; Berry, Christine (1987). "A survey of the South Bird's Head Stock". Workpapers in Indonesian Languages and Cultures. 4: 81–117.
- Remijsen, Albert Clementina Ludovicus (2001). Word-prosodic systems of Raja Ampat languages (PDF). Utrecht: LOT. ISBN 978-90-76864-09-9. Archived from the original (PDF) on 2017-08-09.
- Smits, Leo; Voorhoeve, C. L. (1998). The J. C. Anceaux collection of wordlists of Irian Jaya languages B: Non-Austronesian (Papuan) languages (Part II). Irian Jaya Source Material No. 10 Series B. Vol. 4. Leiden-Jakarta: DSALCUL/IRIS.
- Voorhoeve, Clemens L. (1975a). "Central and western Trans-New Guinea phylum languages". In S. A. Wurm (ed.). New Guinea area languages and language study. Vol. 1 : Papuan Languages and the New Guinea linguistic scene. Pacific linguistics, Series C, No. 38. pp. 345–459.
- Voorhoeve, Clemens L. (1975b). Languages of Irian Jaya : checklist : preliminary classification, language maps, wordlists. Pacific linguistics. Canberra: Dept. of Linguistics, Research School of Pacific Studies, Australian National University. ISBN 978-0-85883-128-5.
- Vries, L. J. de (2004). A short grammar of Inanwatan. An endangered language of the Bird's Head of Papua, Indonesia. Australian National University Press. ISBN 978-0-85883-545-0.
