= Arandai languages =

Berau Gulf dialect cluster of Indonesia

Arandai
- Dombano–Kemberano
- Geographic distribution: Teluk Bintuni Regency, Bird's Head Peninsula, West Papua, Indonesia
- Linguistic classification: Trans–New Guinea?: Berau Gulf; South Bird's Head; Nuclear/East; Kokoda–Arandai; Arandai
- Subdivisions: Dombano; Kemberano

Language codes
- Glottolog: kemb1251

Arandai is a dialect cluster of Teluk Bintuni Regency in West Papua, Indonesia. In Teluk Bintuni Regency, it is spoken in Aranday, Kamundan, and Weriagar districts.

== Names and varieties ==
The treatment at Ethnologue appears to be inconsistent. ISO codes are assigned to two languages, "Arandai" and "Kemberano", the latter of which is also called Arandai. They are said to have 85% lexical similarity, which would make them dialects of one language. However, the two dialects given for Arandai, also called Kemberano and Arandai (a.k.a. Tomu and Dombano), are said to have only 71% lexical similarity, making them different languages. Dialects of Kemberano (Weriagar) are listed as Weriagar (Kemberano) and Barau.

Additional alternative names of Arandai/Kemberano/Dombano–Tomu are given as Jaban (Yaban), Sebyar, Sumuri.

An additional name of Kemberano/Arandai/Barau–Weriagar is given as Kalitami.

Linguasphere 2010 makes a more consistent distinction:

- 20-HD Tomu–Kemberano
  - 20-HDA Tomu–Arandai; includes Yaban, Sebyar
    - 20-HDA-a Tomu
    - 20-HDA-b Arandai (Dombano)
  - 20-HDB Kemberano–Barau
    - 20-HDB-a Kemberano (Kalitami)
    - 20-HDB-b Weriagar
    - 20-HDB-c Barau

Usher (2020) lists Dombano and Kemberano as distinct languages, with Dombano spoken inter alia in Tomu village, and Kemberano spoken in Kalitami and Wariagar.
