= Wayer =

District in Southwest Papua, Indonesia

- District
- Interactive map of Wayer
- Coordinates: 1.501458°S 132.144045°E
- Country: Indonesia
- Province: Southwest Papua
- Regency: South Sorong
- District seat: Wayer

Area
  - Total: 317.89 km^{2} (122.74 sq mi)

Population (2024)
  - Total: 2,456
  - Density: 7.726/km^{2} (20.01/sq mi)
- Time zone: UTC+9 (WIT)
- Postal Code: 98215
- Villages: 8

Wayer is a district in South Sorong Regency, Southwest Papua province, Indonesia.

== Demographics ==
The native population of Wayer district and the majority are the Wayer people (Maybrat Tee), which is one of the sub-ethnic groups of the Maybrat people. The population speaks a dialect of the Maybrat language. Christianity, mainly Protestant, is the majority religion, and almost all of the indigenous population adheres to it.

== Geography ==
Wayer consists of eight villages (kampung), namely:

- Bagraga (Bagaraga)
- Baldon (Boldon)
- Sesor
- Sungguer
- Unggi (Ungi)
- Waigo
- Wardik
- Wayer
