= Matemani =

District in Southwest Papua, Indonesia

- District
- Interactive map of Matemani
- Coordinates: 1°59′20.0796″S 132°7′16.0115″E
- Country: Indonesia
- Province: Southwest Papua
- Regency: South Sorong
- District seat: Mugim

Area
  - Total: 450.49 km^{2} (173.94 sq mi)

Population (2024)
  - Total: 3,237
  - Density: 7.186/km^{2} (18.61/sq mi)
- Time zone: UTC+9 (WIT)
- Postal Code: 98225
- Villages: 6

Matemani is a district in South Sorong Regency, Southwest Papua Province, Indonesia. The district covers an area of 450.49 km2, and had a population of 3,237 at the mid 2024 Census.

== Geography ==
Matemani consists of six villages (kampung), namely:

- Bedare
- Mugim
- Nusa
- Puragi
- Saga
- Tawanggire
