= JBJ =

JBJ may refer to:

== Groups ==
- JBJ (band), a South Korean boy group
- JBJ95, a South Korean musical duo

== People ==
listed alphabetically by first name

- J. B. Jeyaretnam (1926–2008), Singaporean politician and lawyer
- Jackie Bradley Jr. (born 1990), American professional baseball player
- James Bradley Jr., musician (Crazy Town)
- Jon Bon Jovi (born 1962), American musician
- Jon "Bones" Jones (born 1987), American mixed martial arts fighter
- Jorge Bom Jesus (born 1962), Prime Minister of São Tomé and Príncipe

== Other uses ==
- Dombano language, denoted by ISO 639-3 code "jbj"
- Jhoom Barabar Jhoom, a 2007 Bollywood film
