= Puragi language =

Language in Papua

Puragi
- Saga, Iwaro
- Native to: Indonesia
- Region: Puragi village, Matemani District, South Sorong Regency, Southwest Papua, Bird's Head Peninsula
- Ethnicity: Metemani
- Native speakers: (700 cited 1991)
- Language family: Trans–New Guinea?: Berau Gulf; South Bird's Head; Nuclear/East; Iwaro–Kaburi; Puragi

Language codes
- ISO 639-3: pru
- Glottolog: pura1253

Puragi (Saga or Iwaro) is a Papuan language of the Bird's Head Peninsula spoken in Puragi and Saga villages, Matemani District, South Sorong Regency, Southwest Papua.

== Distribution ==
Locations within Sorong Selatan Regency:

- Matemani District: Saga (Sagu-Garam) and Puragi villages
- Inanwatan District: Isogo village

== Phonology ==
Consonants
	Labial	Alveolar	Palatal	Velar	Glottal
Plosive	p b	t d	ɟ	k g	ʔ
Fricative	v		ɕ		
Nasal	m	n			
Approximant	w	r	j		

Vowels
	Front	Central	Back
High	i		u
Mid-high	e		o
Mid-low	ɛ	ə	ɔ
Low		a	
