= Sorong (disambiguation) =

Sorong is a chartered coastal city of West Papua province of Indonesia.

Sorong may also refer to:

- Sorong Regency, an administrative subdivision of West Papua province of Indonesia
- South Sorong Regency, an administrative subdivision of West Papua province of Indonesia
