= Dombano language =

Language

Dombano
- Sebyar, Tomu, or Yaban/Jaban
- Native to: West Papua, Indonesia
- Region: Teluk Bintuni Regency, Bird's Head Peninsula
- Native speakers: (1,000 cited 1987)
- Language family: Trans–New Guinea?: Berau Gulf; South Bird's Head; Nuclear/East; Kokoda–Arandai; Arandai; Dombano

Language codes
- ISO 639-3: jbj
- Glottolog: aran1237

Dombano (Tomu) is a dialect cluster of Teluk Bintuni Regency in West Papua, Indonesia. In Teluk Bintuni Regency, it is spoken in Aranday, Kamundan, and Weriagar districts.
