= Yakorra =

- Village
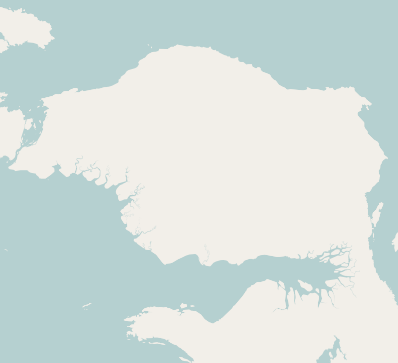
- Location of the village in the Bird's Head Peninsula
- Coordinates: 2°6′S 133°3′E
- Country: Indonesia
- Province: West Papua
- Time zone: UTC+7 (WIB)

Yakorra is a village in West Papua, Indonesia. The village is located in the southern Bird's Head Peninsula.
