= Inanwatan =

- District
- Location of the district in Southwest Papua Location of the district in Indonesian Papua Location of the district in Indonesia
- Coordinates: 2°8′S 132°10′E
- Province: Southwest Papua
- Regency: South Sorong
- Time zone: UTC+9 (WIT)

Inanwatan is a district in Southwest Papua, Indonesia. The district is located on the southern coast of the Bird's Head Peninsula.

The area was named by the colonists from Patipi Bay, Fakfak, who were impressed by the extent of the sago swamps here. The word inanwatan originates in a Patipi language expression meaning "it is all sago" (from inan 'sago' and sewatan 'one').
