= Kokoda language =

Papuan language

Kokoda
- Emeyode
- Native to: Southwest Papua, Indonesia
- Region: Kokoda District, South Sorong Regency, Bird's Head Peninsula
- Ethnicity: Kokoda
- Native speakers: (3,700 cited 1991)
- Language family: Trans–New Guinea?: Berau Gulf; South Bird's Head; Nuclear/East; Kokoda–Arandai; Kokoda
- Dialects: Negeri Besar (Kokoda); Kasuweri (Komudago); Tarof; Yamueti

Language codes
- ISO 639-3: xod
- Glottolog: koko1265

Kokoda is a Papuan language of the Bird's Head Peninsula spoken by the Kokoda (Emeyode) people of Kokoda District, South Sorong Regency, Southwest Papua. The four dialects — Kokoda proper, Kasuweri, Tarof, and Yamueti — are divergent enough to sometimes be considered separate languages.

== Phonology ==
Consonants
		Labial	Alveolar	Palatal	Velar
Plosive	voiceless	p	t	c	k
Plosive	voiced	b	d	ɟ	ɡ
Fricative		β	s	ɕ	ɣ
Nasal		m	n	ɲ	
Rhotic	tap		ɾ		
Rhotic	trill		r		
Approximant		w		j	

- Sounds /b/, /β/; /d/, /r, ɾ/; and /ɡ/, /ɣ/; tend to vary when between vowels.

Vowels
	Front	Central	Back
High	i		u
High-mid	e		o
Low-mid	ɛ		ɔ
Low		a	ɑ
