= Biak people =

Ethnic group of Indonesia

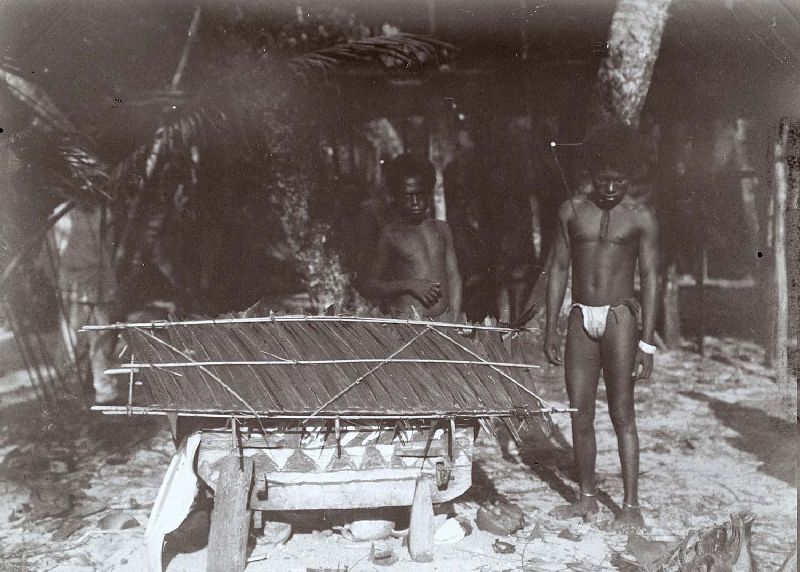
- Traditional Biak burial on the coast of Wari, North Biak District (1907)

Total population
- >70,000

Regions with significant populations
- Biak Islands

Languages
- Biak language

Religion
- Christianity (majority)

The Biak people are an indigenous Austronesian ethnic group native to the Biak Islands of Indonesia (including Supiori, Numfor, and the Padaido Islands) in Cenderawasih Bay, off the northern coast of New Guinea. They speak the Biak language.

== History ==
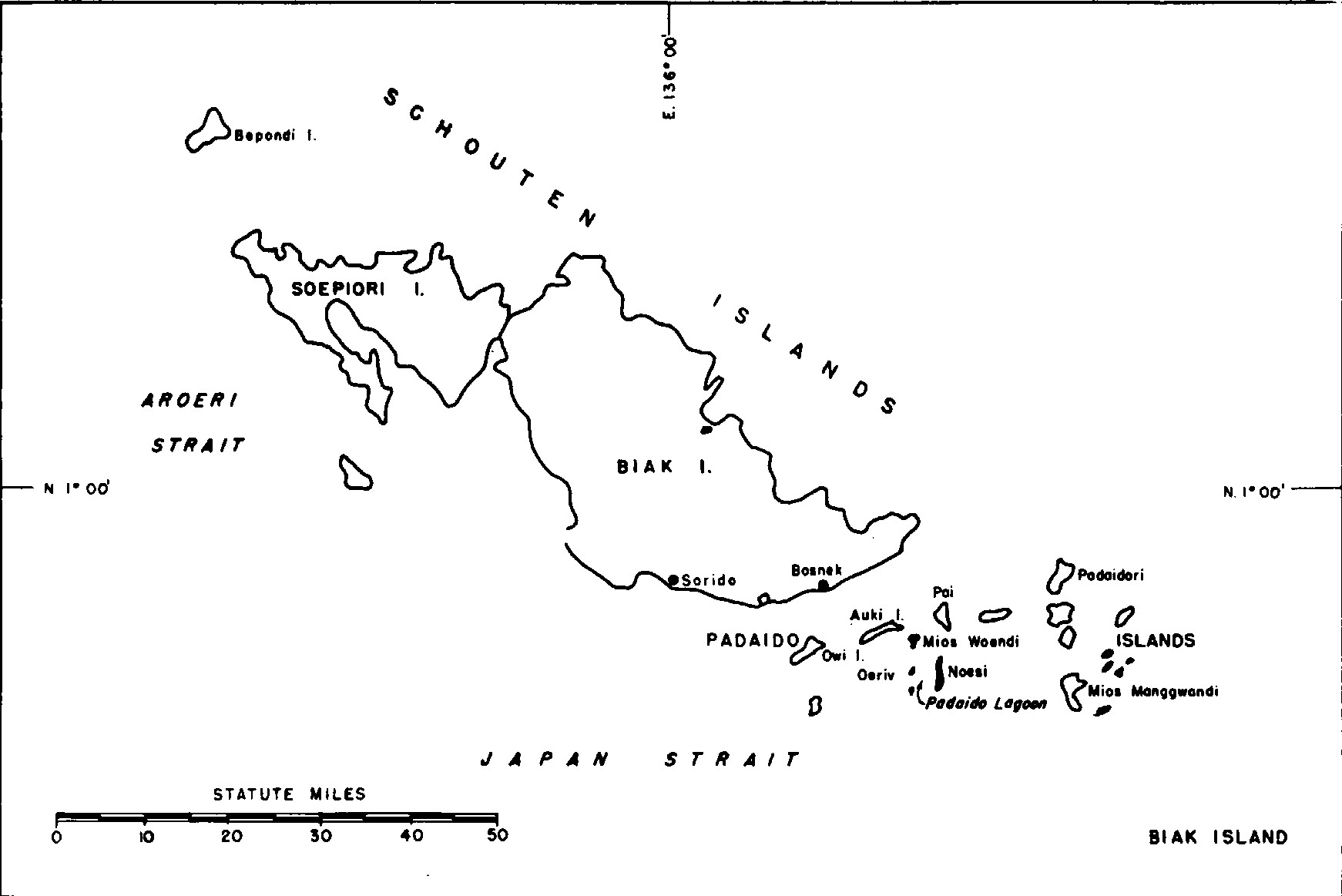
Map of the Biak archipelago

=== Early history ===
According to oral traditions, the Biak people have a long-standing maritime history tied to Cenderawasih Bay and the surrounding islands. From at least the early eighteenth century, the Biak expanded beyond their home islands to establish permanent coastal settlements along the north and northwest coasts of New Guinea's Bird's Head Peninsula (Doberai). Their familiarity with sea navigation allowed them to exert wide-ranging influence across coastal New Guinea, leaving a lasting linguistic footprint; prominent regional place names such as 'Manokwari' (meaning "old village" in Biak) and the regional designations Bomberai and Doberai are derived from the Biak language.

Certain legends, such as those relating to the 15th- or 16th-century Biak war leader Gurabesi, also describe connection between the Papuans and the Sultanate of Tidore.

Europeans first visited the island in the 1500s, with Portuguese navigator Jorge de Menezes first visiting the island in 1526. The island was first mapped by Europeans around this time as well.

=== Nineteenth century ===
During the nineteenth century, the Numforese (the Biak of Numfor Island) held a powerful commercial and political position along the northern coast of New Guinea. Operating a vast maritime network, Biak traders acted as intermediaries between inland Papuans and Moluccan, Makassarese, Buginese, Chinese, and European (Portuguese, Spanish, and Dutch) merchants.

As part of these regional trade networks, inland groups supplied the Biak with forest products, birds of paradise, tobacco, and slaves. In turn, the Biak used slaves and local goods to pay tribute to the Sultan of Tidore or traded them with visiting foreign merchants. This heavy interaction with the Tidorese and western traders introduced administrative and political titles to Biak leaders, such as Mayor, Kaptarau, and Koranu, some of which are still preserved today as clan names or traditional village leadership titles.

=== Colonial era and Christianization ===
European contact intensified during the Dutch colonial period (1898–1962), during which the Biak Islands became a major center for Christian missionary activity. Today, the vast majority of the Biak people are Protestant Christians.

==== World War II ====
During World War II, the Biak Islands were occupied by the Imperial Japanese Army. American forces later recaptured the area in the Battle of Biak, and Dutch colonial rule was restored.

==== Political movements and Indonesian integration ====
The post-war era saw the rise of early Papuan nationalism and political organizing among Biak leaders. In September 1945, Lukas Rumkorem founded Perserikatan Indonesia Merdeka (PIM), recognized as the first political party in Biak, which campaigned for integration with Indonesia. Despite crackdowns and arrests by Dutch authorities, such as the 1948 uprising led by local figures and subsequent intelligence operations against nationalist networks like the Tentara Tjadangan Tjenderawasih (TTT), pro-Indonesian political activities persisted. Prominent Biak figures, notably Frans Kaisiepo and Reverend F.J.S. Rumainum, actively participated in delegations representing Papua during the lead-up to the New York Agreement and Western New Guinea's eventual transfer to Indonesian administration in the 1960s.

==== Biak Incident ====
On 1 July 1998, coinciding with the anniversary of past Papuan independence declarations, Biak became the focal point of severe civil unrest commonly known as the Biak Massacre or Bloody Biak. Protesters associated with the Free Papua Movement (OPM) raised the Morning Star flag at the Kota Biak water tower and maintained a multi-day camp. On 6 July 1998, the Indonesian military (TNI) cracked down on the demonstration, resulting in numerous casualties from gunfire and subsequent violence, with many victims detained or reported missing.

== Demography ==
The core population of the Biak people inhabits the islands of Biak, Supiori, and Numfor in Cenderawasih Bay, with native speakers of the Biak language estimated at around 70,000. Approximately half of the population lives in or near Biak town on the southern coast, which functions as the primary urban and administrative center. The remaining inhabitants reside in small coastal and interior villages connected by local road networks and traditional boat routes. Furthermore, the islands are well-integrated into modern Indonesian infrastructure via regular commercial flights and passenger ferries.

== Economy ==
The traditional and contemporary economy of the Biak people relies heavily on a combination of coastal fishing and small-scale agriculture. In coastal settlements, people engage in deep-sea and shallow-water fishing. Inland and rural village plots are cultivated using shifting agriculture, where staples such as taro, cassava, sweet potatoes, bananas, and mung beans are grown. Households also harvest sago palms in wetter zones and cultivate cash crops like coconuts and betel nuts. Families typically consume what they self-produce and sell surplus crops and catches at local markets or in Biak town. Division of labor traditionally involves men handling heavy land-clearing tasks and women handling domestic tasks such as cooking, while both men and women participate in fishing, marketing, and general cultivation.

== Social structure and kinship ==
Biak society is organized around patrilineal descent, meaning family lineage and the clan name, known as kéret, are traced through the father. Children inherit their father's clan name, while women retain their own family names even after marriage. Kinship ties are traditionally exogamous, requiring individuals to marry outside their immediate family group and frequently outside their home village. Marriage involves the customary payment of a brideprice by the groom's family. Traditionally, newly married couples practiced patrilocal residence by settling near the husband's parents, though contemporary couples have much more flexibility in choosing where to live.
