= Kais language =

Papuan language

Kais
- Kampong Baru
- Native to: Southwest Papua, Indonesia
- Region: Kais District, South Sorong Regency, Bird's Head Peninsula
- Native speakers: (700 cited 1993)
- Language family: Trans–New Guinea: Berau Gulf; South Bird's Head; Nuclear/East; Kais

Language codes
- ISO 639-3: kzm
- Glottolog: kais1235

Kais is a Papuan language of the Bird's Head Peninsula of Kais District, South Sorong Regency, Southwest Papua.
