= South Sorong Regency =

Regency in Southwest Papua, Indonesia

South Sorong Regency Kabupaten Sorong Selatan
- Regency
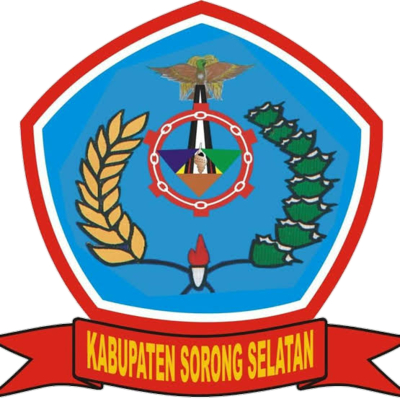
- Seal

- Location in Southwest Papua

- Location in Indonesia
- Coordinates: 1.5050°S 132.2864°E
- Country: Indonesia
- Province: Southwest Papua
- Capital: Kaibus, Teminabuan

Government
  - Regent: Petronela Krenak
  - Vice Regent: Yohan Bodory

Area
  - Total: 6,570.23 km^{2} (2,536.78 sq mi)

Population (mid 2024 estimate)
  - Total: 56,979
  - Density: 8.6723/km^{2} (22.461/sq mi)
- Time zone: UTC+9 (Indonesia Eastern Time)
- Area code: (+62) 952
- Website: sorongselatankab.go.id

South Sorong Regency (Indonesian: Kabupaten Sorong Selatan) is a regency of Southwest Papua province of Indonesia. It has an area of 6,570.23 km^{2}, and had a population of 37,900 at the 2010 Census and 52,469 at the 2020 Census; the official estimate as of mid-2024 was 56,979 (comprising 29,169 males and 27,123 females). The administrative centre is the town of Kaibus in Teminabuan District.

== Geography ==
South Sorong Regency is located in the western part of Papua Island. Geographically, South Sorong Regency at position 131º 421 0” east longitude - 132º 581 12” east longitude and 0º 55' 12” east longitude - 2º 17' 24” east longitude.

- To the north it is bordered by the Sorong Regency
- To the east it is bordered by Teluk Bintuni Regency and Maybrat Regency
- To the south it is bordered by Bintuni Bay and the Seram Sea
- To the west it is bordered by the Seram Sea and Sorong Regency

== Demographics ==
=== Ethnic groups ===
In South Sorong Regency, ethnically, it is divided into four large ethnic groups, namely Tehit, Maybrat, Moi, and Imekko. This ethnic group is divided into many sub-ethnic groups who live in this regency, namely:

- Tehit
  - Tehit Mlafle
  - Tehit Mlakya
  - Tehit Nasfa Sawiat
  - Tehit Imian
  - Tehit Salkma
  - Tehit Fkour
  - Tehit Kna
  - Tehit Srer
  - Tehit Saifi
  - Tehit Ogit Yaben
  - Tehit Gemna
  - Tehit Afsya
  - Tehit Nakna
- Maybrat
  - Giim Towo
  - Igri
  - Rabiante
  - Afrabam
  - Nagin (Nakin Onim Sefa)
  - Kami Rmuuk
  - Sowen Kofat
  - Kami Wengket
  - Wayer
    - Wayer Bronarak
    - Wayer Ciu
    - Wayer Tee
  - Ksim Tohmas Mkoi
  - Ramse
  - Ahminya
  - Kiim Kamis
  - Sawe
  - Aramtis
  - Sikawe
  - Sru Makit
  - Wentaa
- Moi
  - Moi Salkma
- Imekko
  - Inanwatan (Bira, Suabo)
  - Kais (Kaiso, Atori)
  - Kokoda (Emeyode)
    - Imu
    - Yamueti
  - Metemani (Iwaro)
    - Puragi
    - Saga
  - Nerigo (Yahadian, Mugim)
  - Awe (Awee-Mareno)

=== Languages ===
Indigenous languages spoken in South Sorong Regency include Tehit, Moi, Maybrat, Inanwatan, Kaburi, Yahadian, Kais, Kokoda, Konda, and Puragi. On the other hand, Indonesian and Papuan Malay are used as common lingua francas for the residents in here.

== Administrative districts ==
South Sorong Regency comprises fifteen districts (kecamatan), tabulated below with their areas and their populations at the 2010 Census and the 2020 Census, together with the official estimates as of mid-2024. The table also includes the locations of the district administrative centres, the number of administrative villages in each district (totaling 121 rural kampung and 2 urban kelurahan), and its post code.

Kode Kemendagri	Name of District (distrik)	Area in km^{2}	Pop'n Census 2010	Pop'n Census 2020	Pop'n Estimate mid 2024	Admin centre	No. of villages	Post code
92.04.01	Teminabuan	386.89	11,627	19,491	20,648	Kaibus	16 ^{(a)}	98216
92.04.04	Inanwatan	830.54	2,811	3,226	3,349	Mate	9	98223
92.04.06	Sawiat	353.62	1,831	1,344	1,686	Wen	8	98232
92.04.09	Kokoda	648.36	5,876	5,805	7,036	Tarof	16	98221
92.04.10	Moswaren	402.97	2,130	2,756	3,000	Moswaren	7	98212
92.04.11	Seremuk	205.09	1,159	1,554	1,884	Haha	8	98214
92.04.12	Wayer	317.89	1,455	2,395	2,456	Wayer	8	98215
92.04.14	Kais	354.89	2,841	2,925	2,692	Kais	5	98222
92.04.15	Konda	427.21	1,883	2,437	2,581	Bariat	5	98211
92.04.20	Metemani	450.49	2,115	2,996	3,237	Mugim	16	98225
92.04.21	Kokoda Utara (North Kokoda)	484.34	1,666	2,584	2,823	Atori	9	98224
92.04.22	Saifi	621.44	1,747	2,216	2,662	Sayal	10	98213
92.04.24	Fokour	305.01	759	637	801	Pasir Putuh	4	98231
92.04.25	Salkma	90.53	^{(b)}	809	1,010	Alma	5	98233
92.04.26	Kais Darat	690.96	^{(c)}	844	1,114	Mukamat	7	98226
	Totals	6,570.23	18,564	52,469	56,979	Kaibus, in Teminabuan	123	

Notes: (a) including 2 kelurahan - Kaibus (with 4,743 inhabitants in mid 2022) and Kohoin (1,955 inhabitants).
(b) the 2010 population of Salkma District is included in the figure for Sawiat District, from which it was later split.
(c) the 2010 population of Kais Darat District is included in the figure for Kais District, from which it was later split.
