= Konda–Yahadian languages =

Languages from Western New Guinea

Konda–Yahadian
- Geographic distribution: Bird's Head Peninsula, Indonesian Papua
- Linguistic classification: Trans–New Guinea: Berau Gulf; South Bird's Head; Konda–Yahadian
- Subdivisions: Konda; Yahadian

Language codes
- Glottolog: kond1302

Konda–Yahadian is a pair of South Bird's Head languages spoken in Western New Guinea:

- Konda
- Yahadian

Noting low cognacy rates, Holton and Klamer (2018) tentatively consider Konda–Yahadian, as well as Inanwatan–Duriankere and the Nuclear South Bird's Head family to each be independent language families until further evidence can be demonstrated.
