= Kaburi language =

Papuan language

Kaburi
- Awe, Maweyo
- Native to: Indonesia
- Region: Kais District: Sumano, Benawa I North Kokoda District: Benawa II, Bubuko; Kokoda District: Migrito
- Ethnicity: Mareno, Kosiriago, Awe (Kais)
- Native speakers: (600 cited 1986)
- Language family: Trans–New Guinea?: Berau Gulf; South Bird's Head; Nuclear/East; Iwaro–Kaburi; Kaburi

Language codes
- ISO 639-3: uka
- Glottolog: kabu1249

Kaburi or Awe is a Papuan language of the Bird's Head Peninsula of Southwest Papua.
