= South Bird's Head languages =

Families of Papuan languages

South Bird's Head
- South Doberai; North Berau Gulf
- (disputed)
- Geographic distribution: West Papua
- Linguistic classification: ? Trans–New Guinea: ? Berau Gulf; South Bird's Head
- Subdivisions: South Bird's Head proper; Inanwatan; Konda–Yahadian

Language codes
- Glottolog: sout3418
- Map: The South Bird's Head languages of New Guinea The South Bird's Head languages Other Trans–New Guinea languages Other Papuan languages Austronesian languages Uninhabited

The South Bird's Head or South Doberai languages are three families of Papuan languages. They form part of the Trans–New Guinea languages in the classifications of Malcolm Ross (2005) and Timothy Usher (2020), though Pawley and Hammarström (2018) do not consider them to be part of Trans–New Guinea. However, according to Dryer (2022), based on a preliminary quantitative analysis of data from the ASJP database, South Bird's Head languages are likely to be a subgroup of Trans–New Guinea.

== Languages ==
The languages are as follows,

- South Bird's Head
  - Konda–Yahadian (Yabin): Konda, Yahadian
  - Inanwatan (West South Bird's Head): Duriankere, Inanwatan (Suabo)
  - South Bird's Head proper (East South Bird's Head):
    - Kais (Kampong Baru)
    - Iwaro–Kaburi
      - Kaburi (Awee–Mareno)
      - Puragi (Iwaro)
    - Kokoda–Arandai
      - Kokoda (Tarof, Kasuweri)
      - Arandai
        - Kemberano (Weriagar, Barau)
        - Dombano (Tomu)

Noting low cognacy rates, Holton and Klamer (2018) tentatively consider the following three language groups to each be independent language families, pending further evidence.

- Konda–Yahadian
- Inanwatan–Duriankere
- Nuclear South Bird's Head

Usher classifies the South Bird's Head languages as part of a wider Berau Gulf branch of Trans–New Guinea.

== Pronouns ==
The pronouns are:

		singular	plural
1st person	exclusive	*na	*ni-ri, *i-ri
1st person	inclusive	*na	*na-ri, *ya-ri
2nd person		*a	*a-ri, *i-ri

3SG *ni is reconstructable for SBH proper. There appears to be both a plural vowel change from *a to *i, as in proto-TNG, and a plural suffix *-ri.

== Cognates ==
Below are cognates in Nuclear South Bird's Head languages (Arandai, Kokoda, Kemberano, Kaburi, Kais, Puragi) demonstrating their relatedness, as listed by Holton & Klamer (2018):

Nuclear South Bird's Head family cognates
gloss	Arandai	Kokoda	Kemberano	Kaburi	Kais	Puragi
‘eye’	emago	mago	magu	amiagu	magu	imagu
‘head’	kabe	kaba	kabe	wa’ava	kabo	koibi
‘egg’	kuo	ukwo	oku	uko	uku	vuko
‘one’	onate	onasia	anate	ma’aja	onate	mo’onata
‘two’	ogi	ogia	oge	uge	uge	oge
‘I’	nendi	nedi	nedi	neri	neri	nedi

South Bird's Head basic vocabulary quoted by Holton & Klamer (2018) from de Vries (2004), showing diverse non-cognate vocabulary across different language groups:

South Bird's Head basic vocabulary comparison
gloss	Yahadian	Inanwatan	Kokoda	Puragi
arm/hand	re	ewó	obora	nebɔru
leg/foot	dɛbɛ		ɔtɔra	neʔɔru
house	ɔ	meʔáro	kɛnia	einɔ
good	hɔbɔre	sówato	nigeja	nai/najɔ
dog	ɟia	méwoʔo	dawɔra	rɔga
pig	mɔmɔ	bidó	tabai	βuʔi
chicken	kokoro	ádiro	koko	korau
louse	nɔ	ʔóto	kɔnɔ	kɔnɔ
water/river	hɛdɛ/mu	tó/múro	tai/tɔiria	adɔna/ɔwedi
banana	huŋgunɔn	ɸúgi(do)	udi	amimi

== Morphology ==
Except for the outlier languages Konda and Yahadian, all South Bird's Head languages have nouns classified according to masculine and feminine genders, which are determined with final vowel quality. West Bird's Head languages also mark nouns for gender.

== Syntax ==
Unlike many other languages of the Bird's Head Peninsula which display SVO word order (such as Abun, Mpur, Maibrat, West Bird's Head, and others), the South Bird's Head languages have SOV word order.
