= Maybrat language =

Language of West Papua

Maybrat
- Maybrat–Karon
- Region: Tambrauw and Maybrat Regency, Southwest Papua
- Ethnicity: Maybrat
- Native speakers: (25,000 cited 1987)
- Language family: ? Language isolate (Maybratic), or ? Bird's Head: Maybrat
- Dialects: Mayhapeh; Maymaru; Mayasmaun; Maymare; Mayte; Karon Dori (Miyah)

Language codes
- ISO 639-3: Either: ayz – Mai Brat kgw – Karon Dori
- Glottolog: maib1239
- Coordinates: 1.37°S 132.59°E

Maybrat is a Papuan language spoken in the central parts of the Bird's Head Peninsula in the Indonesian province of Southwest Papua.

Maybrat is also known as Ayamaru, after the name of its principal dialect, while the divergent Karon Dori dialect has sometimes been counted as a separate language. Maybrat has not been demonstrated to be related to any other language, and so is often considered a language isolate. Nevertheless, in its grammatical structure, it has a number of features that are shared with the neighbouring languages.

Maybrat is characterised by a relatively small consonant inventory and an avoidance of most types of consonant clusters. There are two genders: masculine and unmarked. Verbs and inalienably possessed nouns alike take person prefixes. There is an elaborate system of demonstratives (words like "this" or "that"), with encoding for distance from the speaker, specificity, and syntactic function. In the clause, there is a fairly rigid subject–verb–object word order, and within noun phrases modifiers follow the head noun. Verb sequences, including serial verbs are very common, and verbs are used for a number of functions which in languages like English are served by adjectives or prepositions.

== Distribution ==
With around 25,000 speakers (as of 1987), Maybrat is among the most populous languages of Indonesian Papua. Its speakers are the Maybrat people, who mainly practice hunting, fishing, and swidden agriculture. They have traditionally lived in scattered homesteads, with the organisation into villages (kampongs) initiated by the efforts of the Dutch administration between the 1930s and the 1950s. These villages, like the establishment of the settlement of Ayawasi in 1953, brought together scattered local groups where each family had spoken a slightly different dialect, resulting in a "melting pot" where the small dialectal differences are less pronounced in the speech of the younger generations.

Maybrat is spoken in a large area in the central parts of the Bird's Head Peninsula, with a large portion of its speakers concentrated around the Ayamaru Lakes, although many are also found in urban areas of Indonesian Papua. Maybrat is surrounded by a number of languages; to the north are two other isolates: Abun and Mpur; to the east are Meyah and Moskona, both members of the East Bird's Head language family; the South Bird's Head languages Arandai, Kaburi, Kais, and Konda are spoken to the south, and to the west are Tehit and Moraid, both of the West Bird's Head family.

The Malay language served as the language of wider communication in this area during the Dutch administration, while more recently the related Indonesian language has taken up this role. Most Maybrat speakers in Ayawasi, for example, are fully bilingual in Indonesian, with the use of Indonesian loanwords and code-switching between the two languages fairly common.

The word "Maybrat" is a compound of mai 'sound, language', and according to one explanation, its meaning is "the language Brat", where "Brat" is the name of a hill near the village of Semetu in the Ayamaru region.

== Classification and dialects ==
Maybrat is often considered to be a language isolate, as a relationship to any other language has not yet been established. There have been attempts to subsume it under putative families like the "Toror languages" (including Abun and the West Bird's Head languages), or the broader West Papuan family. Even if not demonstrably related to any other language and sharing only a small percentage of its vocabulary with its neighbours, Maybrat nevertheless has a great deal in its grammatical structure that resembles other languages of the Bird's Head.

There have been various classifications and listings of the dialects of Maybrat. (Note: For various dialect classifications and for an exhaustive list of villages, see Hays (2003).) The local tradition of the speakers recognises the following six dialects (the districts and villages where each is spoken are given in brackets):

- Mayhapeh (Ayawasi, Kokas, Mosun, Konya, Kumurkek)
- Mayasmaun (Ayata, Kamat, Aisa)
- Karon Dori or Miyah (Miyah, Senopi, Fef, Syujak).
- Maymare (Suswa, Sire)
- Maymaru (Ayamaru): in Ayamaru District and Ayamaru Timur District
- Mayte (Aytinyo, Fuoh): in Aytinyo District

The most divergent dialect, Karon Dori, is sometimes considered a distinct language. The differences between Maymaru and Mayhapeh on the other hand are very small, but the two are nevertheless regarded by their speakers as distinct dialects. This is largely because the Maymaru speak significantly faster, so much so that the Mayhapeh often have difficulties understanding them. The dialect whose phonology and grammar are described in the following sections is Mayhapeh, as analysed by Dol in her 2007 grammar. The two papers by Brown (1990, 1991) are on noun phrases and phonology and they are based on the Maymaru dialect as spoken in the village of Kambuaya.

Irires is also known as Karon Dori, Meon, or Maiyach. Some exonyms include:

- Karon name: Meon ‘people who speak language speedly’
- Mpur name: Bakatan ‘people who produce and wear bracelets’
- Meyah name: Meyah mewi ‘language root’

== Phonology ==
Maybrat has five vowel phonemes and a small consonant inventory consisting of between nine and eleven consonant phonemes, depending on the analysis. Closed syllables are not uncommon, but most types of consonant clusters are broken up with the insertion of a schwa vowel. The placement of stress is not predictable.

=== Vowels ===
The following table presents the five Maybrat vowels along with their allophones as documented in the Mayhapeh dialect:

Vowels in the Mayhapeh dialect
Phoneme	Allophones	Notes
a	a	obligatory before [ʔ], in free variation with [ɑ] otherwise
a	ɑ	obligatory before /x/, in free variation with [a] otherwise
e	e	in open syllables
e	ɛ	in closed syllables
i	i	everywhere
i	ɪ	optionally before /k/
i	j	optionally at the end of the word after a vowel
o	o	in open syllables; also optionally before /m/ in one-syllable words
o	ɔ	in closed syllables, or when preceded by /i/ or /u/
o	ɒ	optionally when preceded by /u/ and followed by either /k/ or /x/
o	ʌ	optionally when preceded by /u/ and followed by /t/
u	u	everywhere
u	y	optionally before /o/: /kuo/ ➜ [ˈkuwo] ~ [ˈkywo]
u	w	optionally at the end of the word after a vowel

A non-phonemic schwa vowel /ə/ is used, mostly to break up consonant clusters (see below). A schwa is also optionally inserted before the initial consonant in a small number of short words: [ti] ~ [əˈti] 'night'. Vowels are phonetically lengthened in stressed one-syllable words. A vowel at the start of a word is optionally preceded, and a vowel at the end of a word is optionally followed, by a non-phonemic glottal stop [ʔ], typically when the word is uttered in isolation: [ɔm] ~ [ʔom] 'rain', [ˈmata] ~ [ˈmataʔ] 'they drink'.

Not all of these allophones have been documented in the Maymaru dialect. However, it does have the following allophone rules not described for the Mayhapeh dialect: word-final /o/ is pronounced as [ɨ] after /i/, while unstressed word-final /a/ is realised as [ə].

=== Consonants ===
Consonants in the Mayhapeh dialect
	Labial	Alveolar	Palatal	Velar
Nasal	m	n		
Plosive	p	t		k
Fricative	f	s		x
Trill		r		
Semivowel	w		j	

In the Mayhapeh dialect, the bilabial stop /p/ does not occur at the end of the word. It has two allophones – voiceless [p] and voiced [b] – which are in free variation in all positions: /tapam/ 'land' → [ˈtapɑm] ~ [ˈtabɑm]; the voiceless allophone is more common, even between vowels. The velar stop /k/ is voiceless, but it has an optional voiced allophone [ɡ] between vowels and an optional unreleased allophone [k̚] at the end of the word. The alveolar stop /t/ is always voiceless, and in word-final position [t] is in free variation with the aspirated [tʰ] and the unreleased [t̚]: /poiit/ 'food' → ['pɔiːt] ~ [ˈpɔiːtʰ] [ˈpɔiːt̚]. The labial fricative /f/ has two allophones in free variation: the [f] and the [ɸ]. The velar fricative /x/, which in the practical orthography is written as h, can be either voiceless [x] or voiced [ɣ]: /xren/ 'they sit' → [xəˈrɛn] ~ [ɣəˈrɛn]. The rhotic consonant is always an alveolar trill [r] at the start of the word, while in other positions it is in free variation with the alveolar tap [ɾ].

Voiced allophones are generally more common in the other dialects. For example, in the Maymaru dialect, spoken in the area of Ayamaru, the bilabial stop is always voiced [b], while the alveolar stop /t/ becomes voiced [d] after /n/. The velar stop /k/ becomes voiced /g/ either before /i/ or after /n/.

The semivowels /j/ and /w/ are treated as distinct consonantal phonemes in Dol's study of the Mayhapeh dialect of Ayawasi, but Brown's analysis of the Maymaru dialect they are instead analysed as allophones of the vowels /i/ and /u/ respectively. In the remainder of this article, the semivowel /j/ is represented with ⟨y⟩, following the practical orthography.

=== Consonant clusters ===
At the phonemic level, consonant clusters do occur, either at the start or in the middle of the word, but they are invariably broken up by the insertion of the epenthetic vowel schwa [ə]. Thus, /tre/ 'bracelet' is pronounced [təˈre], /twok/ → [təˈwɔk] 'they enter', /mti/ → [məˈti] 'evening'. (Note: The schwas are not phonemic and hence not represented in writing. Brown (1991, p. 25) reports that in an earlier proposed practical orthography the schwa was represented using the letter e, mirroring the practice in the Indonesian language familiar to Maybrat speakers, but that was found to be confusing to users.) This also happens when the consonant cluster is in the middle of the word between vowels (/mfokfok/ → [məˌfɔkəˈfɔk] 'they roll'), except if the first consonant of the cluster is a nasal: /nimpon/ → [ˈnimpɔn] 'watermelon'. The epenthetic schwa can assimilate in quality to the following vowel: /mtie/ → [mɪˈtije]. Those Maybrat speakers who are also fluent in Indonesian, can and do pronounce clusters of a consonant + r (which are also found in Indonesian), for example /pron/ 'bamboo' → [prɔn] (in contrast to [pəˈrɔn], as pronounced by people who speak only Maybrat).

=== Stress ===
The placement of stress is not predictable, although it most often falls on the first syllable (schwa vowels getting skipped: /tfo/ → [təˈfo]). Stress is phonemic at least in the Maymaru dialect. In his description of this dialect, Brown adduces several minimal pairs of words that differ solely in the placement of stress: /ˈana/ 'they' (with the stress falling on the first syllable) vs. /aˈna/ 'fence' (stress falling on the second syllable), /moˈo/ 'she itches' vs. /ˈmoo/ 'she takes'. In her study of the Mayhapeh dialect of Ayawasi, Dol notes that such pairs, though perceived by the native speakers as distinct, are acoustically indistinguishable, thus "they" and "fence" are both /ˈana/. Her conclusion, which has received some criticism, is that stress is only weakly phonemic.

At the end of a sentence, many older speakers blow a puff of air through their nose, which appears to be a common phenomenon in the languages of the Bird's Head Peninsula.

== Grammar ==
=== Personal pronouns and prefixes ===
Maybrat has a set of independent personal pronouns and the corresponding person prefixes that are used with verbs and some nouns:

Personal pronouns and prefixes (Mayhapeh dialect)
Meaning	Independent pronoun	Prefix
1S 'I'	tuo	t-
2S 'You (singular)'	nuo	n-
3M 'He'	ait	y-
3U 'She/it'	au	m-
1P 'We'	amu	p-
2P 'You (plural)'	anu	n-
3P 'They'	ana	m-

The Maymaru dialect distinguishes between inclusive 'we' (meaning 'I + you') and exclusive 'we' ('I + he/she'). The inclusive form is anu (with corresponding person prefix b-) and the exclusive one is amu (with prefix n-). It also has somewhat different pronouns for the first and second person singular: tyo (Note: The spelling has been adapted to Dol's system; ty is pronounced as an affricate and written j in Brown's proposed orthography.) 'I', and nyo 'you (singular)'.

The person prefixes are obligatory for verbs and for inalienably possessed nouns (see below for these possession constructions). When added to a verb, the prefix indexes the subject (y-amo 'He goes'), and when added to an inalienably possessed noun, it indexes the possessor (y-ana 'his head'). If the verb or noun begins with the vowel a- then this vowel is dropped before prefixes for the first and second person plural. (Note: This is according to the analysis in Dol (2007, pp. 55). A different treatment, based on the Maymaru dialect, is presented in Brown (1990), where the vowel a is analysed as part of the prefix for all but the first and second person plurals.) The following table lists the prefixes of the Mayhapeh dialect along with an example paradigm:

Meaning	Prefix	Example verb	Example noun
1S 'I'	t-	t-tien 'I sleep'	t-ana 'my head'
1P 'We'	p-	p-tien 'We sleep'	p-na 'our heads'
2S 'You' (singular)	n-	n-tien 'You sleep'	n-ana 'your head'
2P 'You' (plural)	n-	n-tien 'You sleep'	n-na 'your heads'
3M 'He'	y-	y-tien 'He sleeps'	y-ana 'his head'
3U 'She/it/they'	m-	m-tien 'She/it/they sleep'	m-ana 'her/their head/s'

There are words, nouns or verbs, that do not take person prefixes. This is largely determined phonologically: the prefix is not allowed if its addition would result in a word of three or more syllables. There are also five verbs that are exceptions: they do not allow person prefixes even though they are otherwise phonologically eligible. (Note: There is another small set of verbs that do not take person prefixes when they appear as second verbs in a certain rarely used construction.(Dol 2007, pp. 192–95))

=== Demonstratives ===
Maybrat has an elaborate system of demonstratives (these are words like "this", "that", or "there"). They are morphologically complex and consist of a prefix, a demonstrative base, and a suffix. The four demonstrative bases are differentiated based on distance from the speaker: -f- is for objects that are within physical reach of the speaker, -t- indicates objects a little further away but still near, -n- refers to objects that are far away, while -au does not specify a distance and so is used when the distance from the speaker is irrelevant. The demonstrative base is followed by a suffix specifying gender: -o is unmarked for gender, and -i, -ait or -e are for the masculine. Which of the three masculine suffixes to choose depends on the base: -ait is only used after -t, -e is used with -n-, while -i usually combines with -f-. Gender is relevant only with certain prefixes (re- and me-/-fi- + -t-); otherwise, the unmarked suffix -o is used. Examples of the masculine and the unmarked forms:

rae re-f-i
man specific.location-very.near-3M
'this man very near'

fai re-f-o
woman specific.location-very.near-U
'this woman very near'

rae re-t-ait
man specific.location-near-3M
'this man'

fai re-t-o
woman specific.location-near-U
'this woman'

rae re-n-e
man specific.location-far-3M
'that man'

fai ro-n-o
woman specific.location-far-U
'that woman'

The demonstratives in the examples above have the prefix re-, which is used when the specific location of the object is known. If the exact location of the object is not known, then another prefix we- is employed:

pokom we-f-o
pen general.location-very.near-U
'this pen very near around here' (The pen is within reach but its exact position with respect to the speaker is not known.)

pokom re-f-o
pen specific.location-very.near-U
'this pen very near' (The location of the pen can be pinpointed.)

Another prefix is te-, which refers to area, and so demonstratives with this prefix correspond to English words like "here" or "there", unlike ones with re- and we-, which can usually be translated as this or that:

amah re-t-o
house specific.location-near-U
'this house' (The demonstrative refers to the house itself.)

amah te-t-o
house area.ATTR-near-U
'the house here' (The demonstrative refers to the place where the house is situated.)

All three prefixes discussed above – re-, we- and te- – mark their demonstratives for attributive use, that is, such demonstratives typically occur within a noun phrase and modify the head noun. Another set of prefixes is used for adverbial demonstratives, ones that can be used as adverbs to modify a clause. The following two examples contrast attributive and adverbial demonstratives:

amah te-t-o
house area.ATTR-near-U
'the house near here'

y-tien pe-t-o
3M-sleep area.ADV-near-U
'He sleeps near here.

Another prefix is me-. It expresses a presentative: it introduces a new referent, which will normally be the topic of what follows next. Examples are:

m-ama me-t-o
3U-come presentative-near-U
'Here she comes.'

rae y-ros m-n-o
man 3M-stand presentative-far-U
'There the man stands.'

Two further prefixes are fi- 'similar.to', and ti- 'side':

n-no fi-f-o n-no fi-n-o mai
2-do similar.to-very.near-U 2-do similar.to-far-U PROHIB
'Do it like this, don't do it like that. (Dol 2007, p. 104)

m-piet m-amo ti-n-o m-piet m-amo ti-f-o
3U-throw 3U-go side-far-U 3U-throw 3U-go side-very.near-U
'She throws it to the side there and she throws it to the side here.' (Dol 2007, p. 103)

The specific demonstratives mentioned earlier, refo, reto, and rono, can also be used without the re- prefix – as fo, to and no – without a significant change of meaning. Two of these – fo and to – have an additional function. They can serve as anaphoric pronouns, referring to entities mentioned earlier in the text. (Note: Fo can also function as an adverb, with the meaning of -f- 'near' extended to 'very near in time': at the end of a clause, fo adds the meaning of an inceptive aspect 'beginning to'. (Dol 1998, pp. 550–51))

Many of the demonstrative prefixes can also combine with the interrogative base -yo/-ye, resulting in the question words fi-ye 'how?', ro-yo 'which one?' and three more that translates into English as 'where?': to-yo, wo-yo and mi-yo. The difference between the three parallels the difference between the corresponding demonstratives. Mi-yo is used adverbially, while wo-yo and to-yo are normally used to question the locational object of verbs, with the distinguishing feature between these two being the degree of specificity:

ku mi-yo
child presentative-INT
'Where is the child?'

n-amo to-yo
2-go area.ATTR-INT
'Where are you going?' (It is understood that there is a specific destination.)'

m-amo wo-yo
3U-go general.location-INT
'Where does she go?' (The implication is that she does not have a clear goal.)'

Other question words are awiya 'who?', r-awiya 'whose?', p-awiya 'what?', tiya 'how much/many?' and titiya 'when?'.

=== Numerals and counting ===
The younger people, noted Philomena Dol in the 1990s, normally count in Indonesian. Maybrat's traditional counting system described in the rest of this section is nowadays mostly confined to the older generation. It employs base-5 numerals, in common with other non-Austronesian languages of the area. Counting usually starts at the little finger of either hand, (Note: Elmberg (1955, p. 25), who worked in the Ayamaru area, noted that counting starts on the little finger of the left hand.) and proceeds along the fingers of this hand using the dedicated number words: sait (for masculine) and sau (non-masculine) for 'one', ewok (or eok) meaning 'two', tuf 'three', tiet 'four', and mat 'five'. The numbers from six to nine are counted on the other hand, again starting from the little finger, using the complex numerals krem sau (literally 'one finger') for 'six', krem ewok (lit. 'two fingers') for 'seven', etc. 'Ten' is the word statem, which is derived from t-atem 'my hand'. Counting then proceeds with the little toe on one of the feet, where 'eleven' is oo krem sau (lit. 'foot toe one'), 'twelve' is oo krem ewok (lit. 'foot toe two'), etc. until 'fifteen' oo sau muf (lit. 'one full foot'). After that, counting moves to the big toe of the other foot, with 'sixteen' being oo sau krem sau (lit. 'one foot, one toe'). Counting ends at the little toe, with the word for 'twenty' rae sait yhai literally meaning 'one man is gone'. Multiples of twenty then count the number of 'men gone', thus 'forty' is rae ewok mhai, lit. 'two men are gone'.

Number	Maybrat	Indonesian	Number	Maybrat	Indonesian
1	sait sau	satu	13	oo krem tuf	tiga belas
2	ewok eok	dua	14	oo krem tiet	empat belas
3	tuf	tiga	15	oo sau muf	lima belas
4	tiet	empat	16	oo sau krem sau	enam belas
5	mat	lima	17	oo sau krem ewok oo sau krem eok	tujuh belas
6	krem sau	enam	18	oo sau krem tuf	delapan belas
7	krem ewok krem eok	tujuh	19	oo sau krem tiet	delapan belas
8	krem tuf	delapan	20	rae sait yhai	dua puluh
9	krem tiet	sembilan	40	rae ewok mhai rae eok mhai	empat puluh
10	statem	sepuluh	60	rae tuf mhai	enam puluh
11	oo krem sau	sebelas	80	rae tiet mhai	delapan puluh
12	oo krem ewok oo krem eok	dua belas			

=== Nouns and noun phrases ===
==== Nouns ====
Maybrat nouns referring to male humans have a masculine gender. This is not expressed on the noun but shows up in the choice of a personal prefix on words agreeing with this noun. The masculine prefix y- contrasts with m-, which is used for female humans, inanimate nouns, and in the plural (regardless of gender). This makes the feminine the unmarked form, which is in common with most of the Papuan languages that make a gender distinction in their grammar and it is in contrast to such languages in the rest of the world. Nouns do not take number marking.

Nouns can be derived from verbs using the prefix po- (which can be a standalone word meaning "thing"): -iit 'eat' -> poiit 'food', hren 'sit' -> pohren 'chair', -kah 'burn' -> pokah 'garden', kom 'write' -> pokom 'pen'. If forming an agent noun, the verb will then also take the person prefix m- 3U (provided its phonological form allows it): afit 'bite' -> pomafit 'mosquito' (lit. 'thing that bites'), haf 'pregnant' -> pomhaf 'pumpkin' (lit. 'thing that is pregnant').

Compound nouns can be formed of either noun + noun, or noun + verb. In both cases, the second element modifies the first one, for example fane rapuoh, a compound of fane 'pig' and rapuoh 'forest', means wild pig, which is a kind of pig. A compound noun is phonologically a single word, but each of the two elements retains its stress (unless this would result in two consecutive stressed syllables, in which case the stress of the first element is moved to the left), with the stress on the second element becoming the main stress of the compound.

==== Possession ====
In common with most languages of the peninsula, Maybrat expresses possession differently depending on whether it is alienable or inalienable. Compare the two constructions:

Yan y-asoh
Yan 3M-mouth
'Yan's mouth' (Dol 2007, p. 85)

fane ro-Yan
pig POSS-Yan
'Yan's pig' (Dol 2007, p. 89)

Inalienably possessed nouns are the nouns for body parts (like "head", "root" etc.), kinship terms ("father", "wife" etc.), and spatial nouns (m-aom 'outside', m-asuf 'middle', etc.). Such nouns obligatorily take a pronominal prefix, which agrees in person with the possessor; if the possessor is explicitly stated, then it precedes the possessed noun. For alienable nouns, on the other hand, the possessor follows the possessed noun, which does not feature a pronominal prefix but instead takes the possessive marker ro. An inalienably possessed construction can itself be embedded in another possessed construction:

tfo ro-Yan y-atia
machete POSS-Yan 3M-father
'Yan's father's knife' (Dol 2007, p. 136)

==== Noun phrases ====
The order of constituents in a noun phrase generally follows the pattern:

head noun + adjectival verb + numeral or quantifying verb + demonstrative

The so-called 'adjectival verbs' (see below) are verbs that serve the function of what in English would have been an adjective. They take a person prefix that agrees with the head noun.

tfo m-kek m-aku s-au
machete 3U-red 3U-small one-3U
{(head noun)} (adjectival verbs) (numeral)
'one small red machete' (The choice of the 3U affix is determined by the person and gender of the head noun tfo.) (Dol 2007, p. 128)

A numeral can be preceded by a classifier, whose use is optional and does not affect the meaning of the noun phrase. Classifiers agree in person with the head noun.

awiah m-ake eok
taro 3U-fruit two
'two taros' (Dol 2007, p. 130)

There are four classifiers: -ana 'head' (a general classifier that is most commonly used for humans and animates), -akan 'seed/stone' (for seeds and fruit), m-ake 'fruit' (for fruit), and -ata 'leaf' (for money/banknotes). A similar use is made of the noun yu 'bag' when giving the quantity of uncountables:

pasa yu eok
rice bag two
'two bags of rice' (Dol 2007, p. 131)

Quantifying verbs include verbs like waro 'little' and -siar 'many'. There are several verbs that correspond to the English "everyone/everything", these include: -kak 'absolutely everything/everyone', pria(n) 'everyone/everything', -tut 'everyone/everything' (for small groups), and wisau 'everyone/everything' (for large groups).

Last in the noun phrase comes the demonstrative:

rae m-anes wisau re-t-o
person 3U-old all specific.location.near-U
{(head noun)} {(adjectival verb)} {(quantifying verb)} {(demonstrative)}
'all these old people' (Dol 2007, p. 133)

=== Verbs ===
Verbs in Maybrat obligatorily take person prefixes agreeing with the subject (see above for more details).

Verbs can be either intransitive (taking a single argument, a subject) or transitive (taking two arguments: a subject and an object). A subclass of intransitive verbs carry out functions for which languages like English use adjectives. Such 'adjectival' verbs can function both as predicates ("The book is red") and as attributes ("the red book"):

fane reto m-api
pig this 3U-big
'This pig is big.' (Dol 2007, p. 71)

tuo fnak fane m-api reto
1S stab pig 3U-big this
'I stab this big pig.' (Dol 2007, p. 71)

=== Clauses ===
A clause consists of a predicate (typically a verb) and its arguments (typically expressed by noun phrases), with optional adverbial modifiers. In Maybrat, the order of the constituents in a clause is rigid; this is common in the languages of the Bird's Head, whether Papuan or Austronesian, but unusual for the Papuan languages broader afield.

Clauses show a single intonation contour, which involves a rise in pitch on the stressed syllable of the last vowel in the clause, and a subsequent sharp drop.

Because verbs take obligatory person prefixes, there is no need for a subject to be explicitly given if it is readily identifiable from the context. Thus, sentences consisting solely of a verb (with a person prefix) are acceptable:

t-api
1S-big
'I am big.' (Dol 2007, p. 144)

If expressed, the subject precedes the verb, while an object follows the verb. Thus, Maybrat has a rigid SVO word order.

rae m-fat ara
person 3U-fell tree
(subject) (verb) (object)
'The people fell a tree.' (Dol 2007, p. 144)

The object can also be omitted if it can easily be inferred from the context:

m-kai
3U-find
'She finds (something).' (Dol 2007, p. 146)

An object can be given more prominence as a topic by moving it to the start of the clause. The object then has an intonation contour of its own and it is separated from the rest of the clause by a pause:

aya fó / t-ata fe
water this / 1S-drink NEG
'This water, I won't drink it.' (Dol 2007, p. 149)

Adverbials for time are placed before the verb, and if there is a subject they can either precede or follow it:

is mti y-tien fe
yesterday night 3M-sleep NEG
'Last night he did not sleep.' (Dol 2007, p. 151)

All other types of adverbials (for manner, location, etc.) follow the verb:

ait y-no rere u
3M 3M-do carefully again
'He carefully does it again.' (Dol 2007, p. 163)

ait y-amo to-tis amah iye
3M 3M-go LOC-behind house too.
'He goes behind the house too.' (Dol 2007, p. 166)

In common with other languages of the region, Maybrat expresses negation by a clause-final particle. This particle is fe, whose typical use is given in the first example below. But fe can also function as a verb and take a person prefix, as in the second example. These two uses of fe can have different meanings, but the distinction between the two is not consistently maintained.

ait y-amo Kumurkek fe
3M 3M-go Kumurkek NEG
'He does not go to Kumurkek.' (Dol 2007, p. 167)

arko m-fe, y-o ita m-ata
firewood 3U-NEG 3M-take leaf leaf
'There is no firewood, he takes leafes.' (Dol 2007, p. 168)

Questions have the same intonation pattern as other sentence types; this is in contrast to many other languages, like English, where questions typically have a high or rising pitch. Yes/No questions are formed by the addition of a at the end of the clause:

Petrus y-ama oh a
Petrus 3M-come already INT
'Has Petrus already come?' (Dol 2007, p. 178)

Content questions feature a question word replacing whatever part of the clause information is being sought for:

Yul Yumte m-pet awiya
Yul Yumte 3U-marry who
'Who did Yul Yumte marry?' (Dol 2007, p. 180)

=== Verb sequences ===
A notable feature of Maybrat is the extensive use that it makes of sequences of verbs without any overt marking of their relation. Such verb sequences are typified in a number of different constructions, which might be superficially similar, but show upon closer inspection to be syntactically distinct. For example, there might be differences in the readiness with which the verbs can take distinct intonation contours or allow to be separated by pauses, the availability of their objects for extraction into relative clauses, or the possibility for an interrogative particle to take scope over only one of the two verbs. The various types of verb sequences described in the rest of this section can be contrasted to coordinated constructions in which each verb forms a separate clause:

m-wian aya m-ko tafoh saruk poiit
3U-scoop water 3S-burn fire cook food
'She scoops water, burns a fire and cooks food.' (Dol 2007, p. 190)

==== Complement clauses ====
A group of constructions feature a complement clause: the second verb (and its clause) functions as the object of the first verb. The first verb can be a perception verb, a mental activity verb or a verb of saying:

t-he fnia m-ama
1S-see woman 3U-come
'A see a woman coming.' (Dol 2007, p. 196)

t-har t-kom am
1S-know 1S-write letter
'I can write a letter.' ( = 'I know how to write a letter.') (Dol 2007, p. 197)

t-sam t-aut ara
1S-afraid 1S-climb tree
'I'm afraid to climb the tree'. (Dol 1996, p. 30) However, if a pause is inserted after t-sam 'I'm afraid', then the sentence will be interpreted as consisting in two clauses and its meaning will be 'I'm afraid and (so) I climb the tree.'

y-awe n-ame fane
3M-say 2-stab pig
'He says that you stabbed a pig.' (Dol 2007, p. 198) If a pause is inserted after y-awe 'he says', then the second clause will be interpreted as direct speech: 'He says: "You stab a pig."'

Pak guru y-awe y-o pron
mister teacher 3M-say 3M-take bamboo
'The teacher wants to take the bamboo'. (Dol 2007, p. 203) This is the same indirect speech construction as above. The verb -awe 'say' has a wide range of meanings that can be rendered in English with verbs like "want", "think", "believe" or "intend". This is common in Papuan languages. (Note: However, there do exist separate verbs meaning for example "think" (-not), or "hope" (-winaut). (Dol 2007, p. 77))

==== Prepositional verbs ====
A construction that bears certain resemblance to the serial verb constructions known in other languages involves the four so-called prepositional verbs. These are -ae 'at', -kit 'towards', -pat 'from', and -kah 'with/to/for':

t-ama t-pat Sorong
1S-come 1S-from Sorong
'I came from Sorong.' (Dol 2007, p. 205)

t-amus onfuk m-kah sabun
1S-wash clothes 3U-with soap
'I wash the clothes with soap.' (Dol 2007, p. 207) The prepositional verb -kah takes only the 3rd person unmarked prefix m- irrespective of the person of the subject.

There is a cline between typical verbs on the one hand and typical prepositions on the other. The four "prepositional verbs" of Maybrat each fall on different points along this cline and possess different combinations of verbal or prepositional characteristics. One typically verbal characteristic is the ability to serve as the main verb of a clause: -ae 'at' alone among these four can function as the main verb of a clause. Another verbal characteristic is the ability to show agreement with the subject of the clause. In this respect, the two verbs -kit 'towards' and -pat 'from' are more verbal in that they always take person prefixes agreeing with the subject; this contrasts both with -kah 'with/to/for', which always takes only the unmarked third-person prefix m- regardless of the subject, and with -ae, which may follow either pattern. These four verbs also differ in the extent to which their objects can be extracted into relative clauses.

==== Motion verbs ====
Similar to serial verb constructions is also the construction with a second verb of motion (like -amo 'go') whose subject is the same as the object of the first verb:

t-ai bola m-amo
1S-throw ball 3U-go
'I throw the ball away.' (Dol 2007, p. 217)

t-aru awiah m-ama
1S-pull taro 3U-come
'I pull the taro towards me.' (Dol 1996, p. 25)

A similar construction involving the verbs -o 'take' and -e 'give' is available to express the meaning of 'giving something to someone'; such a construction is necessary because verbs in Maybrat can only take two arguments (a subject and an object) and so -e 'give' on its own cannot take arguments for both the object given and the person who received it:

n-o tapak n-e ait
2-take tobacco 2-give 3M
'Take the tobacco and give it to him.', 'Give him the tobacco.' (Dol 2007, p. 218)

=== Complex sentences ===
Apart from the more or less tightly integrated verb sequences from the previous section, there also exist a number of ways of combining full clauses into complex sentences. For example, a number of conjunctions can be used for joining clauses referring to events in a sequence: mati, na, mnan, or o:

na m-kuk intape o m-kuk ara o
{and then} 3U-pull rope ENUM 3U-pull tree ENUM
'Then she pulled a rope and she pulled at a tree.' (Dol 2007, p. 230)

Disjunction ('either, or') can be expressed with the negator fe. Subordinate clauses for purpose or cause are introduced with re 'in order to', mi 'so that', or ke 'because':

t-amo amah kiyam re suster m-he t-ao
1S-go house ill in order to nurse 3U-see 1S-foot
'I'm going to the hospital in order for the nurse to look at my foot.' (Dol 2007, p. 231)

A relative clause is introduced by the relativiser ro: this is the same particle as the one used in possessive constructions (see above), and it may be related to the demonstrative re-.

Simon ro y-men Maria kiyam
Simon REL 3M-marry Maria ill
'Simon who married Maria is ill. (Dol 2007, p. 137)

Similar constructions are available for several kinds of subordinate adverbial clauses. Temporal adverbial clauses are introduced by um ro (lit. 'the moment when') or kine wo (lit. 'the time when') – the difference between these two relativisers parallels the difference between the related demonstrative prefixes re- (specific, can be pinpointed) and we- (non-specific).

kine wo t-amo Sorong tim am
time REL 1S-go Sorong send letter
'When I go down to Sorong, I will send a letter' (Dol 2007, p. 235) The moment of going to Sorong is non-specific, the implication of the use of kine wo is that there is no concrete plan yet.

Adverbial clauses for manner are introduced with fi-re, where fi- is the demonstrative prefix meaning "similar to". The marker for locative adverbial clauses can be one of wo, wo-yo or wo-re, without an apparent difference in meaning. An example of a locative clause:

ana m-suoh wore fra m-hu
3P 3U-clean REL stone 3U-stay
'They clean where the stone is. (Dol 2007, p. 237)

A style figure common in narratives is tail-head linkage, where the last predicate of one sentence is repeated at the start of the next one:

frok m-hu sai amah m-api / m-hu amah m-api m-hu m-hu m-hu ku re-f-i hropit ktus / hropit ktus na m-hu u m-hu m-hu ku re-f-i y-anes / y-anes y-apum o y-ros o y-amo pua-puo o y-amo trit o tipuo y-anes
emerge 3U-stay just house 3U-big / 3U-stay house 3U-big 3U-stay 3U-stay 3U-stay child there umbilical.cord break / umbilical.cord break and.then 3U-stay again 3U-stay 3U-stay child there 3M-old / 3M-old 3M-crawl ENUM 3M-stand ENUM 3M-go toddle-REDUP ENUM 3M-go fluent ENUM immediately 3M-old
'She arrives and just lives at the big house. She lives at the big house and she lives there for a long time and the child's umbilical cord comes off and se still lives there and she lives there for a long time and the child gets older. He gets older and he crawls, he stands, he toddles, he walks well, and then he is grown up.' (Dol 2007, p. 242)

== Bibliography ==
- Brown, William U. (1990). "Mai Brat nominal phrases" (PDF). In Purwo, Bambang Kaswanti (ed.). Miscellaneous studies of Indonesian and other languages in Indonesia, part X. NUSA : Linguistic Studies of Indonesian and Other Languages in Indonesia. Vol. 32. Jakarta: Universitas Katolik Indonesia Atma Jaya. pp. 43–61.
- Brown, William U. (1991). "A quantitative phonology of Mai Brat" (PDF). In Dutton, Tom (ed.). Papes in Papuan linguistics no. 1. Dept. of Linguistics, Australian National University. pp. 1–27. hdl:1885/145736. ISBN 0-85883-393-X.
- Dol, Philomena Hedwig (1996). "Sequences of verbs in Maybrat" (PDF). NUSA - Linguistic Studies of Indonesian and Other Languages in Indonesia. 40.
- Dol, Philomena Hedwig (1998). "Form and function of demonstratives in Maybrat". Perspectives on the Bird's Head of Irian Jaya, Indonesia : proceedings of a conference Leiden, 13 - 17 October 1997. Jelle Miedema et al. (eds.). Amsterdam: Rodopi. pp. 535–553. ISBN 978-90-420-0644-7.
- Dol, Philomena Hedwig (2007). A grammar of Maybrat : A language of the Bird's Head Peninsula, Papua province, Indonesia. Pacific Linguistics. Canberra: Australian National University. hdl:1885/146742. ISBN 978-0-85883-573-3.
- Donohue, Mark (2011). "A grammar of Maybrat : A language of the Bird's Head Peninsula, Papua Province, Indonesia (review)". Oceanic Linguistics. 50 (1): 279–283. doi:10.1353/ol.2011.0011. ISSN 1527-9421. S2CID 144586710.
- Elmberg, John-Erik (1955). "Field notes on the Mejbrat people in the Ajamaru District of the Bird's Head (Vogelkop), Western New Guinea". Ethnos. 20 (1): 1–102. doi:10.1080/00141844.1955.9980787. ISSN 0014-1844.
- Foley, William A. (2017). "The morphosyntactic typology of Papuan languages". The Languages and Linguistics of the New Guinea Area : A Comprehensive Guide. Berlin, Boston: De Gruyter Mouton. ISBN 978-3-11-029525-2.
- Gratton, Nancy E. (1991). "Mejbrat". In Hays, Terence E. (ed.). Encyclopedia of world cultures. Vol. II : Oceania. New York: G.K. Hall. pp. 195–97. ISBN 0816118094.
- Hays, Terence (2003). "Mai Brat" (PDF). Archived from the original (PDF) on 2022-03-29.
- Holton, Gary; Klamer, Marian (2017). "The Papuan languages of East Nusantara and the Bird's Head". The Languages and Linguistics of the New Guinea Area : A Comprehensive Guide. Berlin, Boston: De Gruyter Mouton. ISBN 978-3-11-029525-2.
- Reesink, Ger (2005). "West Papuan languages : Roots and development". In Andrew Pawley; Robert Attenborough; Robin Hide; Jack Golson (eds.). Papuan pasts : Cultural, linguistic and biological histories of Papuan-speaking peoples. Canberra: Pacific Linguistics. pp. 185–218. ISBN 0858835622. OCLC 67292782.
