= Inanwatan–Duriankere languages =

Language family of western New Guinea

Inanwatan–Duriankere
- West South Bird's Head
- Geographic distribution: Bird's Head Peninsula, Indonesian Papua
- Linguistic classification: ? Trans–New Guinea: ? Berau Gulf; ? South Bird's Head; Inanwatan–Duriankere
- Subdivisions: Inanwatan; Duriankere

Language codes
- ISO 639-3: –
- Glottolog: inan1242

Inanwatan–Duriankere or Inanwatan is a pair of South Bird's Head languages spoken in New Guinea:

- Inanwatan
- Duriankere

Noting low cognacy rates, Holton and Klamer (2018) tentatively consider Inanwatan–Duriankere, as well as Konda–Yahadian and the Nuclear South Bird's Head family to each be independent language families until further evidence can be demonstrated.
