= Konda language (Papuan) =

Language in Indonesia

Konda
- Yaben, Ogit
- Native to: Southwest Papua, Indonesia
- Region: Bird's Head Peninsula
- Ethnicity: Yaben
- Native speakers: 1,500 (2025)
- Language family: Trans–New Guinea: ? South Bird's Head; Konda–Yahadian; Konda

Language codes
- ISO 639-3: knd
- Glottolog: kond1303
- Coordinates: 1.83°S 132.06°E

Konda (Ogit, Yabin) is the northwesternmost of the South Bird's Head languages, spoken in Indonesia, on the island of New Guinea. It is spoken by approximately 1,500 people in the Konda District of the Sorong Selatan Regency, and is considered "endangered" by Ethnologue.

== Geographic distribution ==
Konda is a member of the Trans–New Guinea languages, spoken on the northwestern corner of the island of New Guinea. They are all located on the south side of the Bird's Head peninsula in Indonesia. It is spoken in scattered villages in the area, including Wamargege, Simora, Demen, Sisir, and the namesake village, Konda. Within the village of Konda, it is spoken by the Yaben people, not the Tabit people who also live in the village; as a result, some researchers prefer to use the name Yaben for the language.

Konda is most closely related to Yahadian, its neighbor to the southeast. The two languages appear to form a dialect continuum. Yahadian speakers in the village of Mugim reported that they could "easily" understand Konda speakers. They have an estimated lexical overlap of 61%. They form a fairly distinctive branch of the South Bird's Head languages; among other features, they are the only two of the SBH languages not to mark gender on nouns.

Konda is poorly documented, with only enough data for a grammatical sketch and a few focused studies on specific aspects of the language, such as possessives.

== Morphosyntax ==
Konda has fairly simple morphology compared to its neighbors (except Yahadian, which shares Konda's simple morphology). It does not index the verb's arguments via affixes, unlike other South Bird's Head languages. It also does not mark gender or person via affixes. Word order and syntactic structure are the primary determinants of the semantic structure, and the language predominantly uses Subject-Object-Verb (SOV) order.
