= Berau Gulf languages =

Language family of New Guinea

Berau Gulf
- Geographic distribution: Berau Gulf (West Papua), East Timor
- Linguistic classification: Trans–New Guinea: Berau Gulf
- Subdivisions: West Bomberai; South Bird's Head (North Berau Gulf); Mor

Language codes
- Glottolog: None
- The Berau Gulf languages of New Guinea Berau Gulf languages Other Trans–New Guinea languages Other Papuan languages Austronesian languages Uninhabited

The Berau Gulf languages form a high-level branch of the Trans–New Guinea language family in the classification of Timothy Usher. They are spoken along the coasts of the Berau Gulf of western New Guinea (southwestern coast of the Bird's Head Peninsula, the northern coast of the Bomberai Peninsula and the entirety of the Fakfak Peninsula), as well as the islands of Timor (primarily East Timor), Alor and Pantar further west. The constituent families are,

- West Bomberai (including the Timor–Alor–Pantar languages)
- South Bird's Head (North Berau Gulf)
- Mor
