= Bird's Head Peninsula =

Peninsula in Indonesia

Kepala Burung, Doberai Peninsula
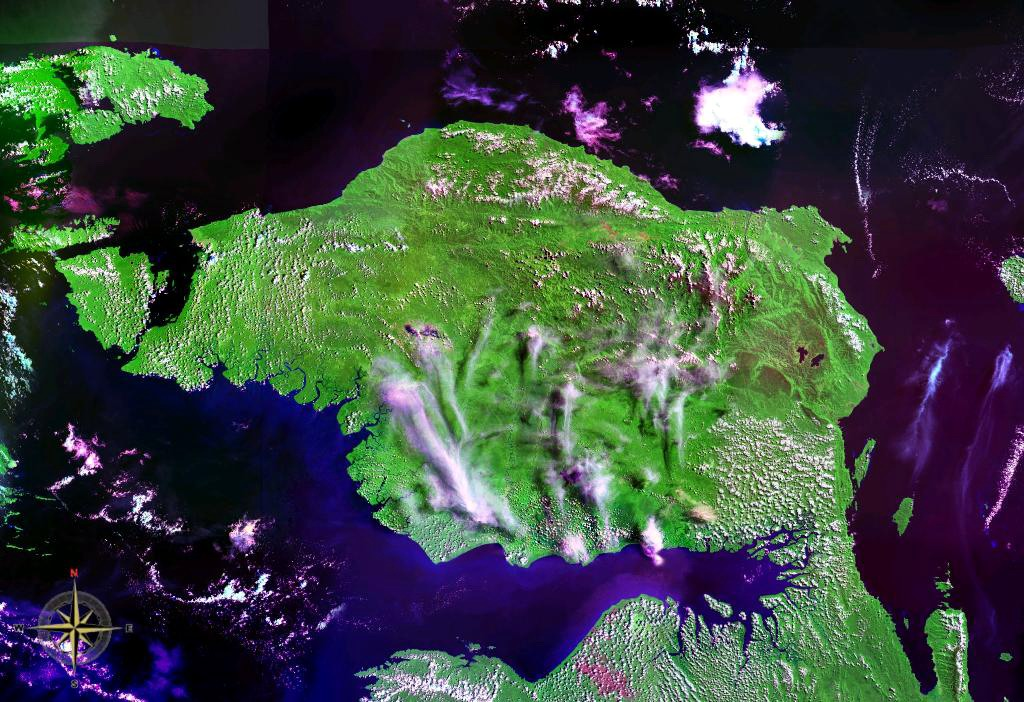
- Bird's Head Peninsula seen from space (false color)

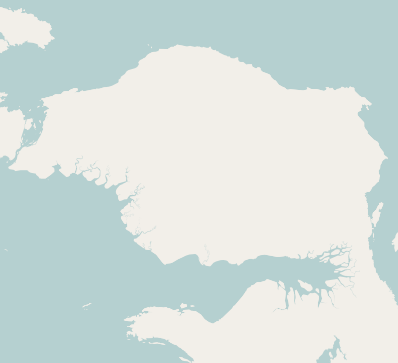
- Location within Bird's Head Peninsula Location within Indonesia Location within Southeast Asia

Geography
- Location: Southwest Papua and West Papua, Indonesia
- Coordinates: 1.5°S 132.5°E
- Adjacent to: Ceram Sea; Berau Gulf; Bintuni Bay; Cenderawasih Bay
- Area: 55,604 km^{2} (21,469 sq mi)
- Highest elevation: 2,955 m (9695 ft)
- Highest point: Pegunungan Arfak

Administration
- Indonesia
- Province: Southwest Papua West Papua
- Largest settlement: Sorong

The Bird's Head Peninsula (Indonesian: Kepala Burung, Dutch: Vogelkop, both meaning Bird's Head) or Doberai Peninsula (Indonesian: Semenanjung Doberai) is a large peninsula that makes up the northwest portion of the island of New Guinea, comprising the Indonesian provinces of Southwest Papua and West Papua. It is often referred to as The Vogelkop, and is so named because its shape looks like a bird's head on the island of New Guinea. The peninsula at the opposite end of the island (in Papua New Guinea) is called the Bird's Tail Peninsula. The peninsula just to the south is called the Bomberai Peninsula.

== Location and geography ==
The Bird's Head Peninsula is at the northwestern end of the island of New Guinea. It is bounded by Cenderawasih Bay to the east, Bintuni Bay to the south, and the Dampier Strait to the west. Across the strait is Waigeo, an island in the Raja Ampat archipelago. Batanta island lies just off the peninsula’s northwest tip. Another peninsula, Bomberai Peninsula, lies to the south, across Bintuni Bay.

The peninsula is around 200 by 300 kilometers, and is bio-geographically diverse, containing coastal plains to the south. The Arfak Mountains are a 2900-meter-high mountain range that is found in the east. Slightly lower than the Arfak Mountains, the Tamrau Mountains are found in the north. Bon Irau is the highest mountain in the Tamrau Mountains, at 2,501 meters (8,205 feet). The highest mountain on the Bird's Head Peninsula is Mount Arfak. It is 2,955 meters (9,695 feet) high and is located 21 miles southwest of Manokwari. Both of the mountain ranges have a diverse mix of sandstone, limestone, and volcanic rock. A large basin called the Kebar Valley divides the two mountain ranges.

== Flora and fauna ==
The peninsula is part of three ecoregions. The lowlands and foothills are in the Vogelkop-Aru lowland rain forests ecoregion. The New Guinea mangroves ecoregion includes coastal mangrove forests. The mountains of the peninsula above 1000 meters elevation constitute the Vogelkop montane rain forests ecoregion. The montane rain forests include an area of more than 22,000 km^{2}. Over 50% of the montane forests are located within protected areas. There are over 300 bird species on the peninsula, of which at least 20 are unique to the ecoregion, and some live only in very restricted areas. These include the grey-banded munia, Vogelkop bowerbird, and the king bird-of-paradise.

Road construction, illegal logging, commercial agricultural expansion and ranching potentially threaten the integrity of the ecoregion. The south-eastern coast of the Bird's Head Peninsula forms part of the Teluk Cenderawasih National Park.

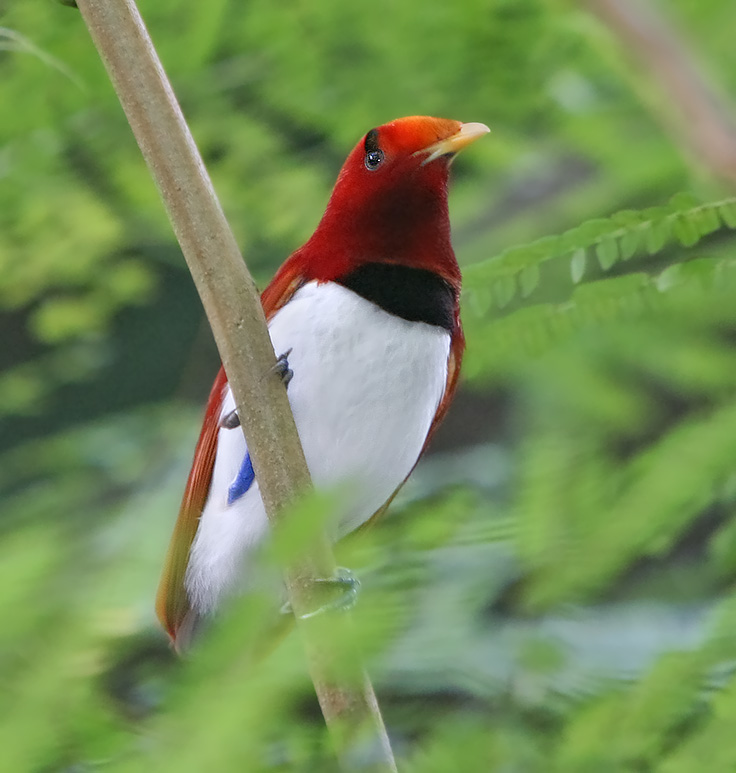
The king bird-of-paradise is one of over 300 bird species on the peninsula.

== Culture ==
Archaeological findings indicate that local settlement dates back at least 26,000 years BP. Today, most people live in villages along the coast, with small concentrations inland. Villagers practise subsistence farming by shifting cultivation of copra, rice, maize and peanuts, as well as hunting. There are more than 80 villages scattered around the peninsula. There are about 18 main settlements that are the principal towns of the five regencies found on the peninsula. These cities include Bintuni, Teminabuan, Sorong, Aimas, and Manokwari. The largest settlements are the city of Sorong on the west coast and Manokwari on the east coast. Manokwari is the largest city with as of 2010 a population of 135,000 and, within the metropolitan area, a population of 155,000. The city of Sorong has a population of 125,000 and, within the metropolitan area, a population of 170,000. This city also has the largest metropolitan area.

== Languages ==
Papuan Malay is the local lingua franca spoken in the Bird's Head Peninsula. The official language is Indonesian.

The Austronesian languages spoken on the Bird's Head Peninsula mostly belong to the South Halmahera–West New Guinea (SHWNG) group.

There are various non-Austronesian Papuan languages native to the peninsula, which are classified as South Bird's Head languages, East Bird's Head languages, West Bird's Head, or language isolates.

Papuan language families:

- South Bird's Head
  - Nuclear South Bird's Head
  - Inanwatan–Duriankere
  - Konda–Yahadian
- East Bird's Head
  - Nuclear East Bird's Head
  - Hatam–Mansim
- West Bird's Head

Language isolates:

- Abun
- Mpur
- Maybrat

== See also ==
- Yakorra
