= List of districts of West Papua =

The province of West Papua in Indonesia is divided into regencies. The regencies are turn are divided administratively into districts, also known in Indonesian as distrik or kecamatan.

== List ==
The districts of West Papua and their respective regencies are as follows (as of December 2019). Administrative villages (kampung) are also listed for each district.

Regency	District	Languages in district	Administrative villages
Fakfak	Arguni		Andamata, Arguni, Fior, Furir, Taver
Fakfak	Bomberay	West Bomberai languages	Bumi Moroh Indah, Mekarsari, Onim Jaya, Onimsari, Pinang Agung, Tesha (Tesha Perda), Wono Rejo
Fakfak	Fak-Fak (Fakfak)		Fak Fak Selatan, Fak Fak Utara, Gewerpe, Lusi Peri, Wrikapal
Fakfak	Fak-Fak Barat (Fakfak Barat)		Kiat, Kwuhkendak, Pahger Nkindik, Porum, Purwahab Tonggo, Purwasak, Werba, Werba Utara, Wurkendik
Fakfak	Fak-Fak Tengah (Fakfak Tengah)		Air Besar, Brongkendik, Danaweria, Hambrangkendik, Kanantare, Katemba, Kayu Merah, Mandopma, Nemewikarya, Pasir Putih, Pirma, Raduria, Sakartemin, Unipokpok
Fakfak	Fak-Fak Timur (Fakfak Timur)		Kiria Bisa, Saharei, Sanggram, Tunas Gain, Urat, Weri
Fakfak	Fakfak Timur Tengah		Kalamanuk, Kotam, Krabelang, Kwama, Wambar, Wambar Timur, Waserat, Wayati, Wayati Barat, Wayati Timur
Fakfak	Furwagi		Gar, Rumbati, Salakiti, Sengkiti, Tanehamur, Tawar, Twootkindik, Werfra
Fakfak	Karas		Antalisa, Faur, Kiaba, Malakuli, Mas, Tarak, Tuberwasak
Fakfak	Kayauni		Homorkokma, Kaburbur, Kayuni, Kuagas, Mananmur, Pattukar, Rangkendak, Ubadari, Warpa
Fakfak	Kokas		Batufiafas, Kampung Baru, Kimina Kra, Kinam, Kokas Kota, Kriawaswas, Mambunibuni, Mandoni, Masina, Pang Wadar, Patimburak, Sekar, Sisir, Sosar, Ugar
Fakfak	Kramongmongga		Bahbadan, Gewab, Kramongmongga, Kwamkwamur, Mamur, Mbaham Ma Youn, Nembukteb, Pikpik, Tentreda, Wargep
Fakfak	Mbahamdandara		Darembang, Goras, Goras Selatan, Mbahamdandra, Mitimber, Waremu, Wos
Fakfak	Pariwari		Dulanpokpok, Kapaurtutin, Sekban, Sekru, Sukuru Tuare, Tanama, Torea, Wagom, Wagom Utara
Fakfak	Teluk Patipi		Adora, Bisa, Degen, Mawar, Muhri, Offie, Patipi Pasir, Patipi Pulau, Puar, Sum, Tetar, Tibatibananam, Us
Fakfak	Tomage		Mbima Jaya, Otoweri, Salawier, Tomage, Wammar, Wamosan, Warisa Mulya, Wasa Mulya, Wonodadi Mulya
Fakfak	Wartutin		Kamandur Tetar, Siboru, Sipatnanam, Wartutin, Werabuan, Werpigan
Kaimana	Buruway		Adi Jaya (Adijaya), Edor, Esania, Gaka, Guriasa, Hia, Kambala, Nusaulan (Nusaulan Jaya), Tairi, Yarona
Kaimana	Kaimana		Coa, Foroma Jaya, Jarati, Kaimana Kota, Kamaka, Krooy, Lobo, Lumira, Mai Mai, Marsi, Murano, Namatota, Oray, Sara, Saria, Sisir, Tanggaromi, Trikora, Werua
Kaimana	Kambrau (Kambraw / Kamberau)		Bahumia, Kooy, Rauna, Sermuku (Ubia Sermuku), Waho, Wamesa, Werafuta
Kaimana	Teluk Arguni Atas		Afu Afu (Afuafu), Bayeda, Bofuwer, Borogerba, Erigara, Feternu (Fetermu), Fudima, Furnusu (Fumusu), Gusi, Kensi (Kasira), Kokoroba, Maskur, Moyana, Pigo, Sawatewera (Sawatawera), Sawi (Sawia), Tiwara, Tugumawa (Tuguwara), Turgani (Tugarni), Wainaga, Wanggita, Warua, Warwasi, Weswasa
Kaimana	Teluk Arguni Bawah (Yerusi)		Egerwara, Inari, Jawera, Kufuriyai, Manggera, Nagura, Ruwara, Seraran, Sumun, Tanusan, Ukiara, Urisa, Wanoma, Waromi, Wermenu
Kaimana	Teluk Etna	Etna Bay	Bamana, Boiya, Nariki, Rurumo, Siawatan
Kaimana	Yamor		Hairapara, Omba Pamuku, Ure (Mury / Uray), Urubika, Wagoha (Wagioha), Wosokuno
Manokwari	Manokwari Barat		Amban, Ingramui (Inggramui), Manokwari Barat, Manokwari Timur, Padarni, Sanggeng, Soribo, Tanah Merah Indah, Udopi, Wosi
Manokwari	Manokwari Selatan		Acemo, Anday, Anggresi (Angrisi), Dihara, Dobut (Doopud / Doput), Katebu, Maruni, Masyepi (Masiepi), Misapmeysi, Mupi, Ngunimbouw (Ngunibouw), Sowi, Waluri (Waruri / Weluri), Wamesa, Warkomi, Warmomi (Warmumi), Warswami (Warsuami), Wasai (Wasay)
Manokwari	Manokwari Timur		Aipiri, Arowi, Ayambori, Bakaro, Mansinam, Pasir Putih, Susweni
Manokwari	Manokwari Utara		Asai, Bremi, Cabang Dua (Caban Dua), Indou Oufa (Indo Oufa), Inoduas (Iroduas), Inya, Lebau, Mandopi, Meyes, Meyunfoka, Mubraidiba, Mubri, Pami, Sairo (Sayro), Saubeba, Singgimeba, Tanah Rubuh (Tanah Rubu), Teluk Mubri, Warbefor, Yonggam, Yoom I, Yoom II
Manokwari	Masni		Aska, Aurmios, Bowi Subur, Igor, Inyei, Jowen, Kali Merah, Koyani (Koyami), Macuan, Makwan, Mansaburi, Mantedi, Masni, Meiforga, Membowi, Merejemeg, Meyeruk (Mereyuk), Meyof II, Moubja, Muara Prafi, Muara Wariori, Prafi Barat, Ririnfos, Sembab, Sibuni, Sumber Boga, Undi, Urey, Wamfoura (Wam Bola), Wariori, Wariori Indah, Yensum, Yonsoribo
Manokwari	Prafi		Aimasi, Bedip Matoa (Debit Motoa), Bogor, Desay, Ingkwoisi (Inguisi), Kali Amin, Kerenu, Lismaungu (Lismanggu), Mebji (Mebiji), Prafi Mulya, Somi (Semi), Udapi Hilir (Udap Hilir), Uhyehebrig (Ogyehek), Umbuy, Wasegi Indah, Waseki Pop (Wasegi Pop)
Manokwari	Sidey		Kaironi, Kasi (Kassi), Manggupi, Meyof I, Saray, Sidey, Sidey Baru, Sidey Jaya, Sidey Makmur, Wamnowi (Womnowi), Waramui (Waramoi), Wariki
Manokwari	Tanah Rubuh		Ayawi, Cuyehep, Hanghouw, Imbeisika I (Imbeisika), Imbeisika II (Imboisika), Imboiti, Imhasuma, Indibo, Mbatma, Menyumfoku, Mirowi (Mironi), Misabugoid, Ningdip, Rembuy, Ukemboisi, Ukopti, Umnum, Urwambei, Warami, Wariari, Warkapi, Warmawai, Warnyeti, Wedoni
Manokwari	Warmare		Aiwou (Aywou), Amber, Asarbey (Asarbei), Bahamyenti, Dindey, Duweibey (Dueibei), Duwin, Figoud, Guentuy, Hingk, Iboisrati, Ibuwau, Indisey, Indonbey (Indondey), Kipuwau (Kibauw), Kwau, Madrat, Meny, Mingre, Minoqbei (Minogbei), Mokwam, Ngungguen, Nimbay, Snaimboy, Sotea, Sraindabey, Subsay, Syou (Siyau), Tanah Merah, Umcen (Umcem), Warmare
Manokwari Selatan	Dataran Isim		Dibera, Disihu (Dihisu), Disra (Desra), Duhugesa, Hugamod (Hugomot), Inyuara, Isim, Mindermes, Sibjo, Tahosta (Tohosta), Tubes, Umuhousi (Umousi)
Manokwari Selatan	Momi Waren		Dembek, Demini, Gaya Baru, Nij (Neny Pantai / Nenei Pantai), Siwi, Waren, Yekwandi
Manokwari Selatan	Neney		Aryawenmoho, Benyas, Disi, Hiyou, Neney, Sesum, Wama
Manokwari Selatan	Oransbari		Akeju, Margo Rukun (Margorukun), Margomulyo, Masabui, Masabui II, Muari, Oransbari, Sidomulyo, Sindang Jaya, Wandoki, Warbiadi, Warkwandi, Waroser, Watariri
Manokwari Selatan	Ransiki		Abreso, Bamaha, Hamawi, Hamor, Kobrey, Mambrema, Nuhuwei, Ransiki, Sabri, Susmorof, Tobou, Wamcei, Yamboi
Manokwari Selatan	Tahota		Kaprus, Reyob, Seimeba, Yarmatum (Yermatum)
Pegunungan Arfak	Anggi		Ayaubey, Hungku, Igembai, Imbai, Iraiweri, Mentubey, Pamaha, Srubey, Susi, Suteibey, Testega Pamaha, Ullong, Uper
Pegunungan Arfak	Anggi Gida		Itkau, Krobut, Ngisrow, Sakumi, Sibiogud, Sisrang, Tombrok, Tubyam
Pegunungan Arfak	Catubouw		Aiga, Bigwaimud, Binggrayud, Catubouw, Coijut, Idemai, Ijigreg, Imandrigo, Jim, Kaungwam, Manggesuk, Mieycomti, Mihij, Mihou, Minmo, Ndabouw, Slomiou, Soudin, Sugemeh, Timtouw, Unti
Pegunungan Arfak	Didohu		Cigera, Cirnohu, Danmou, Demdamei, Dibetik, Disra, Dugrimog, Gedeira, Iranmeba, Kusmenau, Miseda, Sirgemeh, Sneremer, Tomstir
Pegunungan Arfak	Hingk		Aryon, Cangoisi, Demunti, Gueipimbai, Guwei Uti, Haktiebou, Humeisi, Ikimabou, Kisap, Kwaiyehep, Kwok Dua, Kwok Satu, Liehak, Manggot, Mbegau, Mbrande, Minyeimemud, Monut, Ngimoubri, Ntap, Nungkimor, Penibut, Punggung, Sopnyai, Tigaucomti, Tingwoikiou, Tumbeibehei, Umcep, Urwong
Pegunungan Arfak	Membey		Imbeisba, Inyebuow, Koney, Membey, Memti, Usti
Pegunungan Arfak	Minyambaouw		Aduer, Andang, Anggra, Apul, Awaibehel, Ayau, Bingwoyut, Coisi, Demaisi, Driye, Handuk, Imbenti, Imbonggun, Imbrekti, Indabri, Inggramhim, Injuar, Ipingosi, Mainda, Mbingma, Memangker, Micadiwor, Miconti, Minyambouw, Misangoisi, Mitiede, Nimbiau, Ninsimoi, Pinyausi, Sigim, Simerbei, Sinaltousi, Smanggei, Ugjeheg, Umpug, Ungga, Wamminda
Pegunungan Arfak	Sururey		Anuk, Dugahani, Inyaub, Kobrey, Kopo, Kostera, Menesrij, Saugemeba, Sungedes, Sururey, Tomstera, Tuhubea
Pegunungan Arfak	Taige		Ansum, Awigau, Deurohu, Disura, Genyu, Horeta, Irbos, Siskedowo, Taige, Tridaga, Ubeisa
Pegunungan Arfak	Testega		Asai Dua, Demuora, Dumbrey, Iba, Jigja, Meidogda, Meifekeni, Meifokeda, Meifowoska, Meigehenawu, Meijugjijigja, Meimersa, Meksi, Morumfeyi, Testega
Teluk Bintuni	Aranday	Arandai	Aranday (Arandai), Baru (Kampung Baru), Kecap, Manunggal Karya / Jaya
Teluk Bintuni	Aroba		Aroba, Sangguar, Sido Makmur, Wimbro (Nelayan Wimbro), Yaru
Teluk Bintuni	Babo		Amutu, Irarutu III, Kasira, Nusei
Teluk Bintuni	Bintuni		Argosigemerai, Beimes, Bintuni Barat, Bintuni Timur, Iguriji, Masina, Tuasai, Wesiri
Teluk Bintuni	Biscoop		Eniba, Ibori, Jahabra, Laudoho, Menyembrui (Menyembru), Meyorga, Mowitka
Teluk Bintuni	Dataran Beimes		Cumnaji, Horna (Homa), Huss, Menci, Sir, Ugdohop
Teluk Bintuni	Fafurwar (Irorutu)	Irarutu	Fruata (Fuata / Irorutu II), Meryedi (Maryedi), Riendo
Teluk Bintuni	Kaitaro		Sara, Suga, Tugarama (Tugerama), Warga Nusa I (Warganusa I / Warbanusa I), Warga Nusa II
Teluk Bintuni	Kamundan		Bibiram, Kalitama I (Kalitami I), Kalitama II (Kalitami II), Kenara
Teluk Bintuni	Kuri		Naramasa, Obo, Refideso, Sarbe, Wagura
Teluk Bintuni	Manimeri		Atibo Manimeri, Banjar Ausoy, Bumi Saniari, Korano Jaya, Pasamai, Waraitama
Teluk Bintuni	Masyeta		Kalibiru, Maestofu (Mestofu), Masyeta, Mesomda
Teluk Bintuni	Merdey		Anajero, Mekiesefeb, Menggerba, Merdey, Meryeb, Meyetga, Meyom, Mogromus, Morombuy
Teluk Bintuni	Meyado (Mayado)		Barma, Barma Baru (Stencool), Meyado (Mayado / Meyabo), Vasco Damneen (Vesco Damnem / Sten)
Teluk Bintuni	Moskona Barat	Moskona	Istiwkem (Istikem), Macok, Mejnic (Majnic / Majnik), Meyerga (Mayerga)
Teluk Bintuni	Moskona Selatan	Moskona	Barma Barat, Inggof, Jagiro, Meyenda, Rawara
Teluk Bintuni	Moskona Timur	Moskona	Igomu, Mesna, Sumuy (Sumui)
Teluk Bintuni	Moskona Utara	Moskona	Inofina, Merestim (Maristim), Mosum, Moyeba
Teluk Bintuni	Sumuri (Simuri)	Sumuri	Forada, Materabu Jaya, Saengga, Tanah Merah, Tofoi
Teluk Bintuni	Tembuni		Araisum, Bangun Mulya (Bangun Mulyo / Mulia), Mogoi Baru, Tembuni
Teluk Bintuni	Tomu		Ekam, Sebyar Rejosasi / Rejosari, Taroy (Toray / Taroi), Tomu
Teluk Bintuni	Tuhiba		Kucir, Sibena Permai (II), Sibena Raya (I), Tisaida, Tuhiba
Teluk Bintuni	Wamesa (Idoor)		Mamuranu, Wamesa I - Idoor, Wamesa II - Yakati, Yansei (Yansey / Ensei / Yensei)
Teluk Bintuni	Weriagar		Mogotira (Mogmesa), Tuanaikin, Weriagar, Weriagar Baru, Weriagar Utara
Teluk Wondama	Kuri Wamesa		Ambumi, Dusner, Nanimori, Simei (Simiei), Sobiar, Yerenusi
Teluk Wondama	Naikere		Inyora, Oya (Oyaa), Sararti, Undurara, Wosimi (Wosimo), Yabore
Teluk Wondama	Nikiwar		Kurei, Mamisi, Tamoge, Werabur, Werianggi
Teluk Wondama	Rasiei		Isey (Isei), Nggatum, Rasiey (Rasiei), Sasirey (Sasirei), Senderawoy / Senderawoi (Sindrawoi), Tandia, Torey, Uryemi (Uriyem / Uriemi), Webi
Teluk Wondama	Roon		Inday, Mena, Menarbu, Niab, Sariay, Syabes, Yende
Teluk Wondama	Roswar		Syeiwar, Waprak, Yomber
Teluk Wondama	Rumberpon		Isenebuay (Isenebuai / Senebuay / Senebuai), Iseren (Isren), Wetitindau, Yariari, Yembekiri II, Yomakan, Yombekiri I (Yembe Kiri)
Teluk Wondama	Soug Jaya	Sougb	Kaprus, Nuspairo, Reyob (Rayob), Siresi, Yarmatum (Yermatum)
Teluk Wondama	Teluk Duairi		Aisandami, Sobei (Sobey), Sobey Indah, Yopanggar (Yopengar)
Teluk Wondama	Wamesa		Ambuar, Karuan, Nordiwar, Sabubar, Yarpate
Teluk Wondama	Wasior		Dotir, Iriati, Maimare (Maimari), Maniwak, Manopi, Moru (Gayabaru), Rado, Ramiki, Wasior I, Wasior II
Teluk Wondama	Windesi		Sandey, Sombokoro, Wamesa Tengah, Windesi, Yopmeos (Yopmios)
Teluk Wondama	Wondiboy		Issui, Kabouw, Kaibi, Wondiboy

== See also ==
- List of districts of Papua
- List of ethnic groups of West Papua
