= Arfak people =

Ethnic group in Indonesia

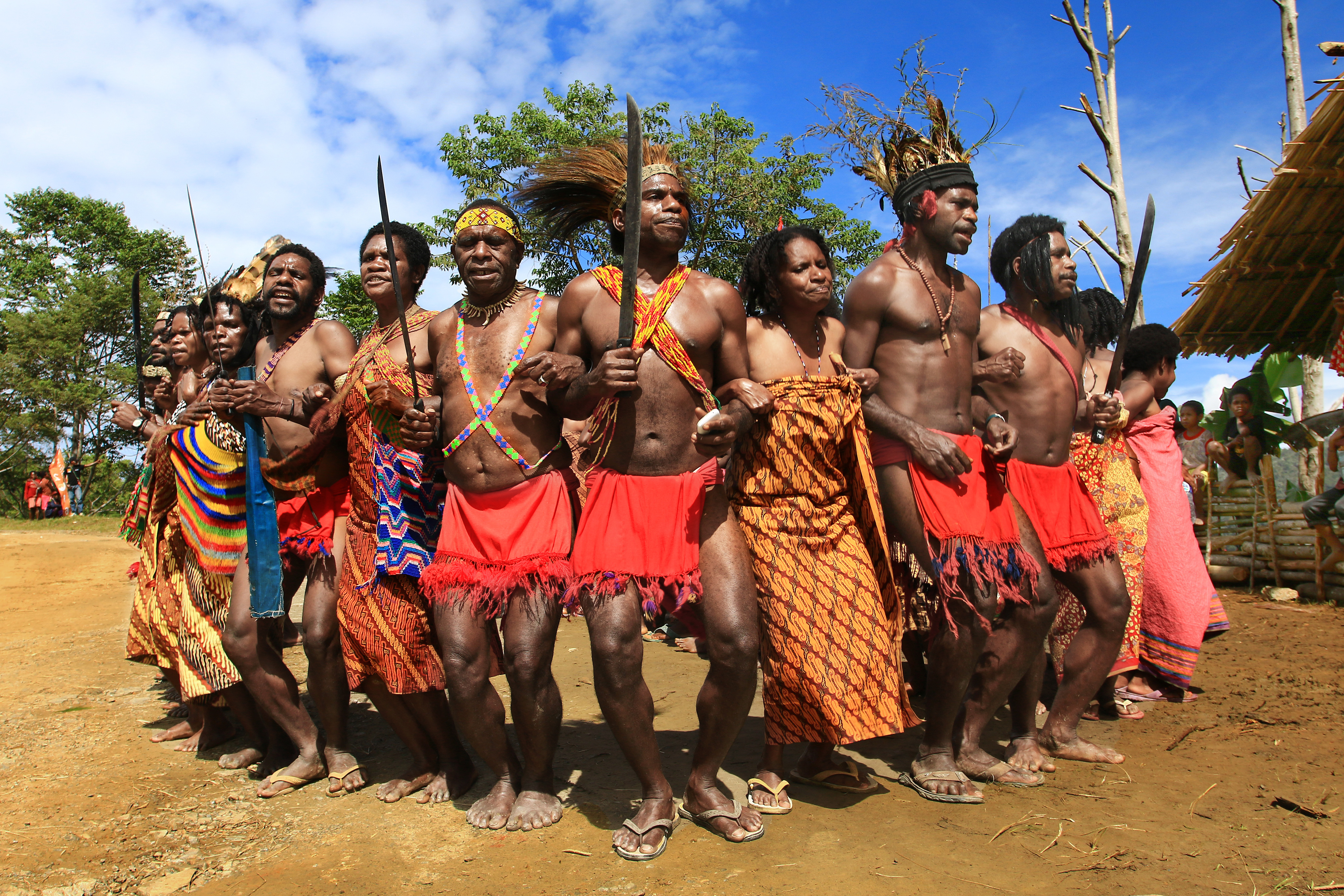
- Magasa dance of the Arfak people

Total population
- at least 70,000–100,000

Regions with significant populations
- Indonesia (2010 Census): 100,000
  - Pegunungan Arfak Regency: ±40,000
  - Manokwari Regency: ±40,000
  - South Manokwari Regency: ±20,000

Languages
- Hatam, Meyah, Moile, Sougb, Papuan Malay, and Indonesian

Religion
- Christianity (majority)

Related ethnic groups
- Hatam, Meyah, Moile, Sougb

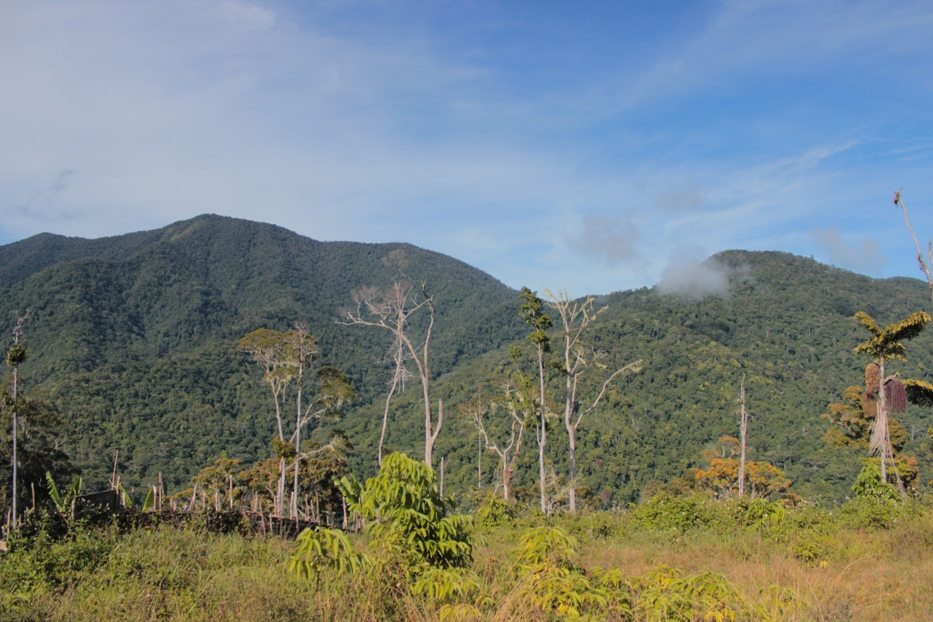
The Arfak Mountains in West Papua

The Arfak people are an ethnic group inhabiting the Arfak Mountains on the Bird's Head Peninsula in West Papua, Indonesia. The area inhabited by the Arfak people is in Pegunungan Arfak Regency at an altitude of 2,950 metres (9,680 ft) above sea level. The Arfak Mountains border Manokwari Regency to the north, South Manokwari Regency to the east, Teluk Bintuni Regency to the south, and South Sorong Regency to the west.

Pegunungan Arfak Regency is accessible via two main routes: through Manokwari Regency or via South Manokwari Regency.

== Etymology ==
The word arfak comes from the word arfk in Biak, meaning "people who sleep on fire", because the Arfak people place burning coals under their stilted houses to warm themselves.

== Sub-groups ==
According to "the father of Indonesian anthropology" Koentjaraningrat, the inhabitants of the Arfak Mountains consist of four sub-groups with similar cultures: Hatam, Meyah, Sougb, and Moile. Each group speaks a different language, so they cannot communicate with each other in their native tongues.

Arfak sub-groups inhabit the Arfak Mountains with clear territorial divisions. The Hatam, the largest group in the southern Arfak Mountains, live in Oransbari District and Ransiki District. The Meyah, often called the "original Arfak people," inhabit the eastern mountains in Warmere and Prafi Districts. The Moile live in the western mountains in Minyambouw District, while the Sougb inhabit the northern mountains in Anggi District.

== Arfak culture ==
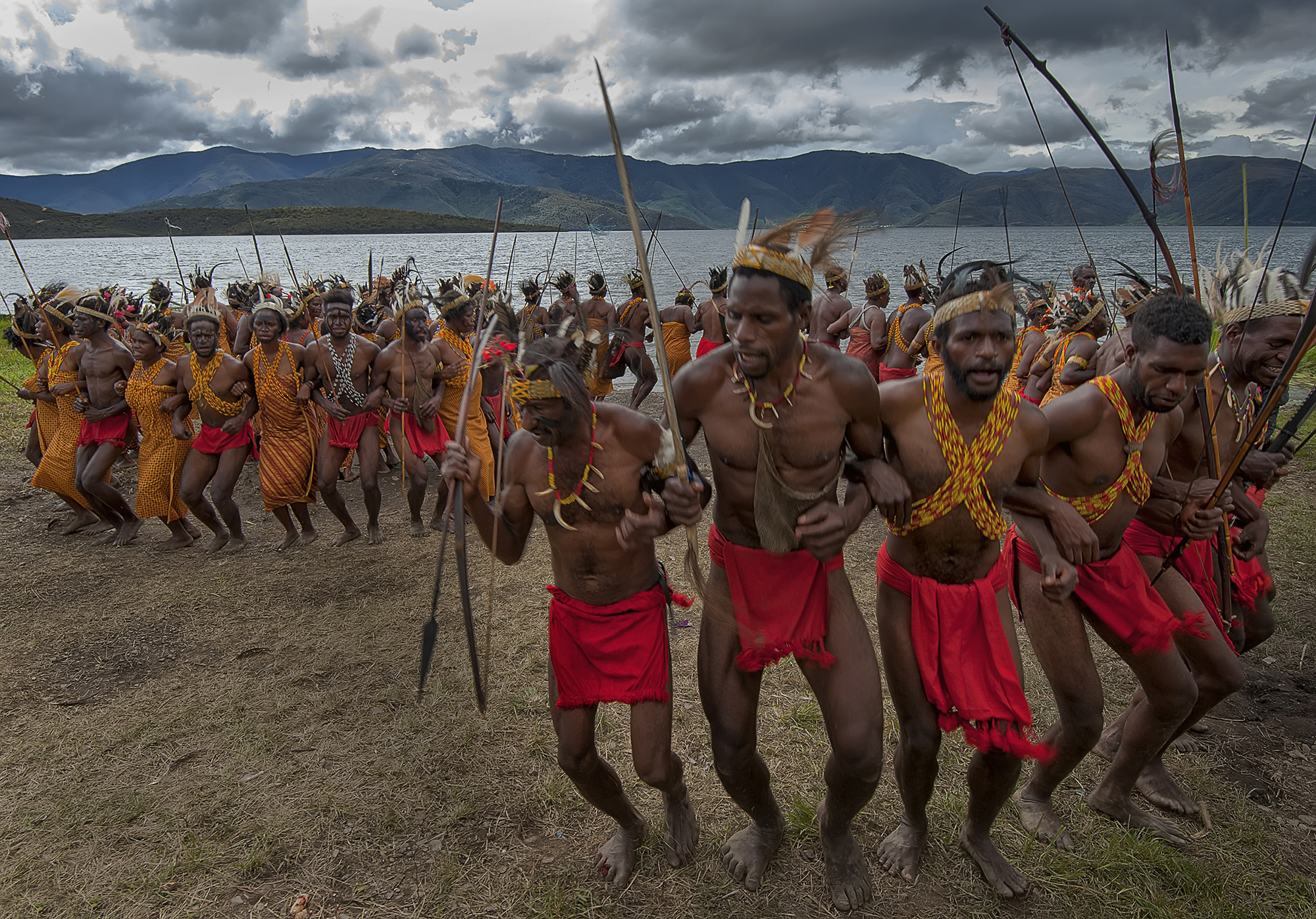
The Tumbu Tanah Dance, also known as the "Snake Dance", performed by the Arfak people

The Arfak people take pride in their tribal identity, and when traveling outside their region, they openly identify as part of the larger Arfak tribe. The four sub-groups of the Arfak people each have different languages, although Hatam and Moile still share some grammatical similarities with the main Arfak language. Weapons among the Arfak and their four sub-groups include bow and arrows. The complete bow and arrow set is called inyomus in Sougb and inyomusi in Irai village. Practitioners of black magic among the Arfak, known as suwanggi, are sometimes hired as assassins. The Sougb call them surer.

The Arfak people have traditional dances such as the Tumbu Tanah Dance, which all sub-groups of the Arfak perform. The dance has two names depending on location: when performed on streets it is called Tumbuk Tanah, and when performed near houses it is called Tumbuk Rumah. The dance is accompanied by songs telling stories of plants, farming, the history of the Arfak people, beliefs, and past wars.

Another dance, the Magasa Dance, is also known as a Snake Dance to outsiders. The name refers to the winding, snake-like movements following the song's lyrics. Magasa is performed during weddings, harvest season, and when welcoming important guests. It is danced in pairs between men and women with hand-holding, jumps, and stomping. It tells stories of romance, heroism, and nature's beauty. The Red Fruit Dance is performed only by Arfak youths and represents the land's beauty.

Each Arfak sub-group is led by a clan leader, and each group has distinct clans and languages. The Moile have clans such as Kowi, Saiba, Mandacan, Sayori, Ullo, Ayok, Indow, Wonggor, among others.

The Arfak are skilled hunters and traditional healers.

== Thousand Legs House ==
Arfak's traditional stilt house has walls made of wood, a roof made of straw, pandan or sago leaves, and a floor of bamboo or nibung splits. Their traditional houses, commonly called "thousand-legs house" (Indonesian: Rumah kaki seribu), are known as mod aki aksa in Meyah, igmam in Hattam, and tu misen in Sougb. It is not only a dwelling but also a venue for cultural events; the upper part is for living and household activities, while the lower part is for livestock and firewood storage.

== Bibliography ==
=== Books ===
- Kondologit, Enrico Yory; Sawaki, Andi Thompson (2016). Tarian Tumbu Tanah (Tari Tradisional Masyarakat Arfak di Kabupaten Arfak, Provinsi Papua Barat) [Tumbu Tanah Dance (Traditional Dance of the Arfak People in Arfak Regency, West Papua Province)] (in Indonesian). Yogyakarta: Balai Pelestarian Nilai Budaya Papua dan Amara Books. ISBN 978-602-6525-10-9.
- Frank, Simon Abdi K. (2012). Arsitektur Tradisional Suku Arfak di Manokwari [Traditional Architecture of the Arfak People in Manokwari] (in Indonesian). Jayapura: Kementerian Pendidikan dan Kebudayaan, Balai Pelestarian Nilai Budaya Jayapura, Papua Kerjasama dengan Kementerian Pendidikan dan Kebudayaan, Pusat Studi Kawasan Pedesaan, Universitas Cenderawasih, Jayapura, Papua. ISBN 978-602-7980-01-3.
- Koentjaraningrat, dkk (1994). Irian Jaya: Membangun Masyarakat Majemuk [Irian Jaya: Building a Plural Society] (in Indonesian). Jakarta: Penerbit Djambatan. ISBN 978-979-4281-70-3.
- Assa, Veibe Ribka; Hapsari, Windy (2015). Peranan Perempuan Hattam dalam Beberapa Aspek [The Role of Hattam Women in Several Aspects] (in Indonesian). Yogyakarta: Balai Pelestarian Nilai Budaya Papua dan Kepel Press. ISBN 978-602-3560-62-2.

=== Journals ===
- Hastanti, Baharinawati W.; Yeny, Irma (March 2009). "Strategi Pengelolaan Cagar Alam Pegunungan Arfak Menurut Kearifan Lokal Masyarakat Arfak di Manokwari Papua Barat" [Strategy for Managing the Arfak Mountains Nature Reserve According to Local Wisdom of the Arfak People in Manokwari, West Papua] (PDF). Info Sosial dan Ekonomi Kehutanan (in Indonesian). 9 (1). ISSN 1979-5556. Archived from the original (PDF) on 2 April 2019.
- Hapsari, Windy (March 2016). "Iwim (Tato) Orang Hatam di Kabupaten Manokwari" [Iwim (Tattoo) of the Hatam People in Manokwari Regency]. Jurnal Penelitian Sejarah Dan Nilai Tradisional (in Indonesian). 23 (1). ISSN 2615-3483.
- Muhammad Hujairin, dkk (April 2017). "Revitalisasi Kearifan Lokal Suku Arfak di Papua Barat dalam Rangka Mendukung Ketahanan Pangan Wilayah" [Revitalization of Local Wisdom of the Arfak People in West Papua to Support Regional Food Security]. Manajemen Pertahanan (Jurnal Pemikiran dan Penelitian Manajemen Pertahanan) (in Indonesian). 3 (1). ISSN 2654-9700.
