= Ger Reesink =

Dutch linguist

- Born: Gerard P. Reesink
- Occupation: Linguist

Academic background
- Education: University of Amsterdam

Academic work
- Main interests: Papuan linguistics

Gerard P. Reesink (more commonly known as Ger Reesink) is a Dutch linguist who specializes in Papuan languages.

== Education ==
He studied psychology at Utrecht University. He obtained his PhD in linguistics at the University of Amsterdam, where he completed his dissertation Structures and their functions in Usan, a Papuan language of Papua New Guinea.

== Research ==
In the 1990s, he researched the languages of the Bird's Head Peninsula as part of The Irian Jaya Studies: Program for Interdisciplinary Research (ISIR), which resulted in publications such as A grammar of Hatam (1999) and Languages of the eastern Bird's Head (2002). He also dealt with Papuan-Austronesian language contact in eastern Indonesia.

== Publications ==
- West Papuan languages (2006)
- East Nusantara as a linguistic area (2008)
- Genetic and linguistic coevolution in northern Island Melanesia (2008)

Pacific Linguistics publications

- Reesink, G.P. "Languages of the Aramia River Area". In Reesink, G.P., Fleischmann, L., Turpeinen, S. and Lincoln, P.C. editors, Papers in New Guinea Linguistics No. 19. A-45:1-38. Pacific Linguistics, The Australian National University, 1976. doi:10.15144/PL-A45.1
- Reesink, G.P. A Grammar of Hatam, Irian Jaya, Indonesia. C-146, xvi + 230 pages. Pacific Linguistics, The Australian National University, 1999. doi:10.15144/PL-C146
- Reesink, G. editor. Languages of the Eastern Bird's Head. PL-524, ix + 340 pages. Pacific Linguistics, The Australian National University, 2002. doi:10.15144/PL-524
  - Reesink, G.P. "The eastern Bird's Head languages compared". In Reesink, G. editor, Languages of the Eastern Bird's Head. PL-524:1-44. Pacific Linguistics, The Australian National University, 2002. doi:10.15144/PL-524.1
  - Reesink, G.P. "A grammar sketch of Sougb". In Reesink, G. editor, Languages of the Eastern Bird's Head. PL-524:181-276. Pacific Linguistics, The Australian National University, 2002. doi:10.15144/PL-524.181
  - Reesink, G.P. "Mansim, a lost language of the Bird's Head". In Reesink, G. editor, Languages of the Eastern Bird's Head. PL-524:277-340. Pacific Linguistics, The Australian National University, 2002. doi:10.15144/PL-524.277
- Reesink, G. "West Papuan languages: roots and development". In Pawley, A., Attenborough, R., Golson, J. and Hide, R. editors, Papuan Pasts: Cultural, linguistic and biological histories of Papuan-speaking peoples. PL-572:185-218. Pacific Linguistics, The Australian National University, 2005.
- Reesink, G. "A connection between Bird's Head and (Proto) Oceanic". In Evans, B. editor, Discovering history through language: papers in honour of Malcolm Ross. PL-605:181-192. Pacific Linguistics, The Australian National University, 2009.
- Reesink, G. "Prefixation of arguments in West Papuan languages". In Ewing, M. and Klamer, M. editors, East Nusantara: Typological and areal analyses. PL-618:71-96. Pacific Linguistics, The Australian National University, 2010.
