= Thousand Legs house =

Traditional Arfak house

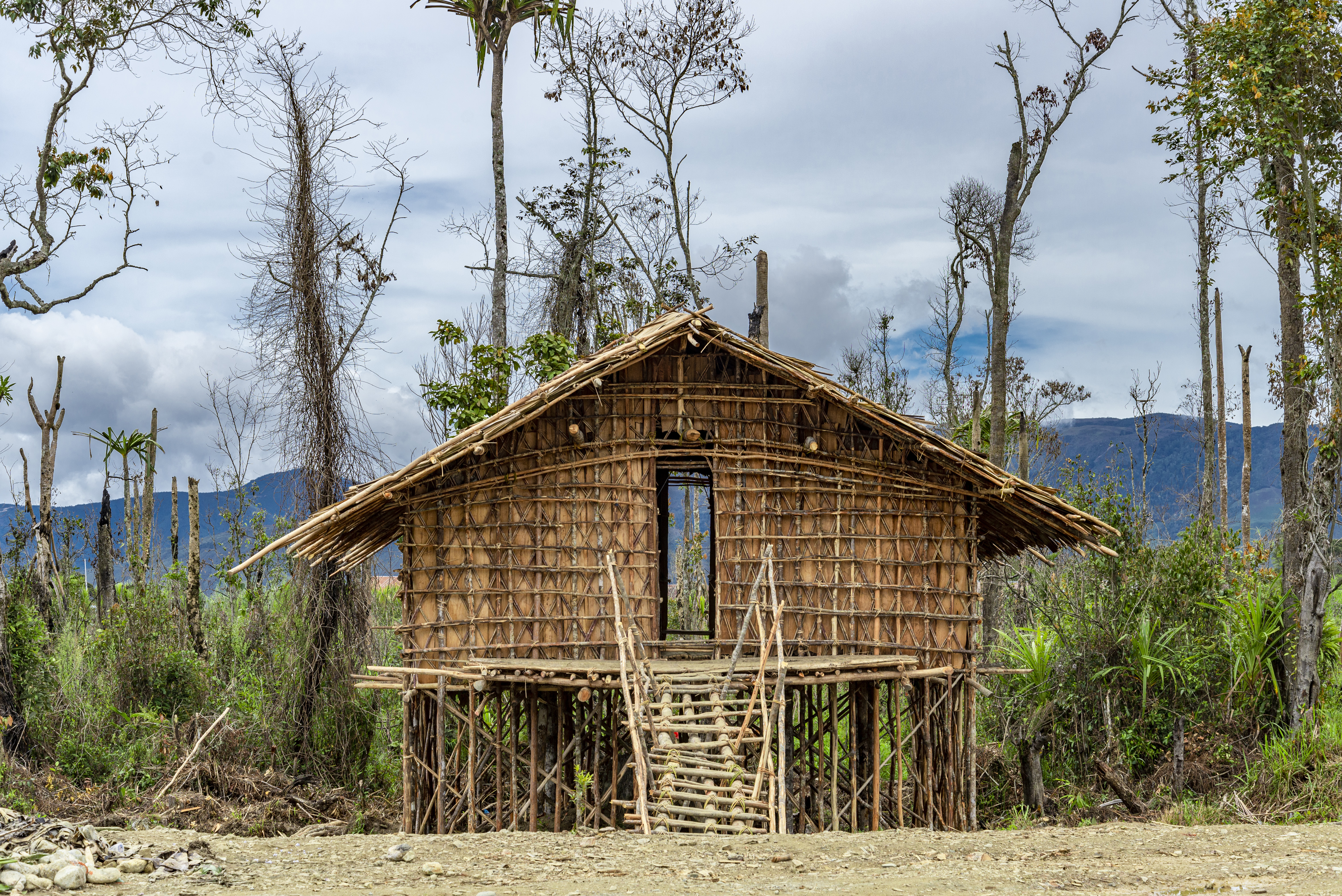
Thousand legs house

The thousand legs house (Indonesian: Rumah kaki seribu) is the traditional house of the Arfak people who reside in Manokwari Regency, West Papua.

The house is dubbed "Thousand Legs" because it uses many supporting poles underneath, so when seen, it has many legs like a millipede. Meanwhile, its roof is made of straw or sago leaves. The poles are made from tall and short-sized wood. The function of these wooden poles is to protect the dwellers from enemy attacks and black magic threats. The thousand legs house is of the stilt house type and has a typical Manokwari pattern. In the local language, this house is called Mod Aki Aksa in the Meyah language, Igkojei by the Wamesa tribe, Igmam in the Hattam language, Tu Misen in the Sougb language.

The thousand-legged house is mostly inhabited by residents living in mountainous areas with cold weather. This house is built tall to avoid attacks from wild animals. It also does not have windows, which are intended to keep the temperature inside the house warm.

The thousand-legged house is Arfak's ancestral heritage. Its construction is based on the philosophy of the local lifestyle, so the house can only be found in the Arfak Mountains Regency and its surroundings.

== Form ==
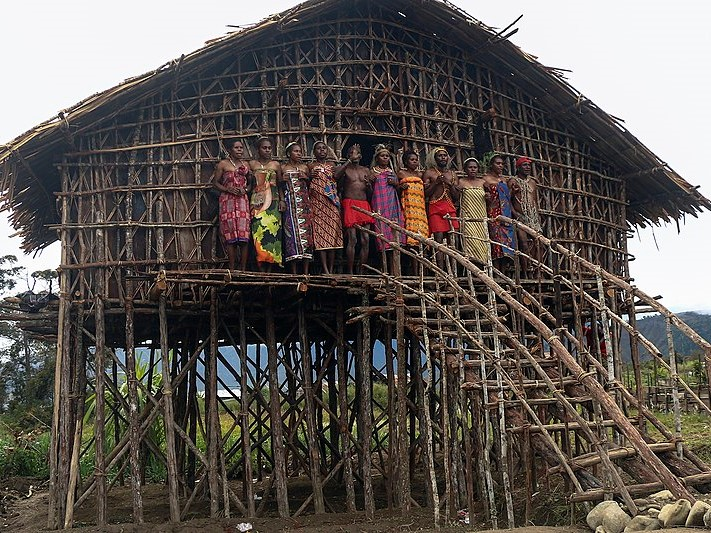
The Arfak people is performing the Tumbu Tanah dance on top of the thousand-leg house to welcome guests

The thousand legs house generally has dimensions of 8 x 6 meters. The height of the platform measured from the ground is around 1 - 1.5 meters. The peak roof height ranges from 4.5 to 5 meters. The pillars are made of wood with a diameter of 10 cm. The foundation pillars of the house are very close together, spaced about 30 cm apart. The floor and walls are made of widened pieces of wood tightly tied together and wrapped with smaller wooden poles. As for the roof, it is made of straw/grass or sago leaves tied to supports, which are also made of wood. The connections of the wooden pillars, floor, walls, and roof are tied using rattan fiber and wood bark fiber to give a strong and natural impression.

Because the house does not have windows, the only way to create air circulation is through the doors. The house has two doors which are the front door and the back door. The house's interior is not divided into rooms like modern houses but into two sections. The left side is for women (ngimsi), while the right side is for men (ngimdi). Inside, there is also a fireplace to warm the room. Like other traditional stilt houses, the thousand legs house is usually inhabited by several families living together inside.

For the Arfak community, the thousand legs house serves as a shelter, a place to educate children, and a venue for festivities. There are gaps in the floor that allow air to enter the house, ensuring good air circulation. Inside, there is a spacious space under the house used as a livestock pen. In a specific area, there is a room designated for ceremonies and traditional celebrations. In the central part of the house, the floor is not covered with wood, so if there's a dance party, it can be done on the ground. However, the presence of such traditional houses is rarely found nowadays because many villagers prefer to build modern houses made of concrete floors, brick walls, zinc roofs, and equipped with windows.

== Gallery ==
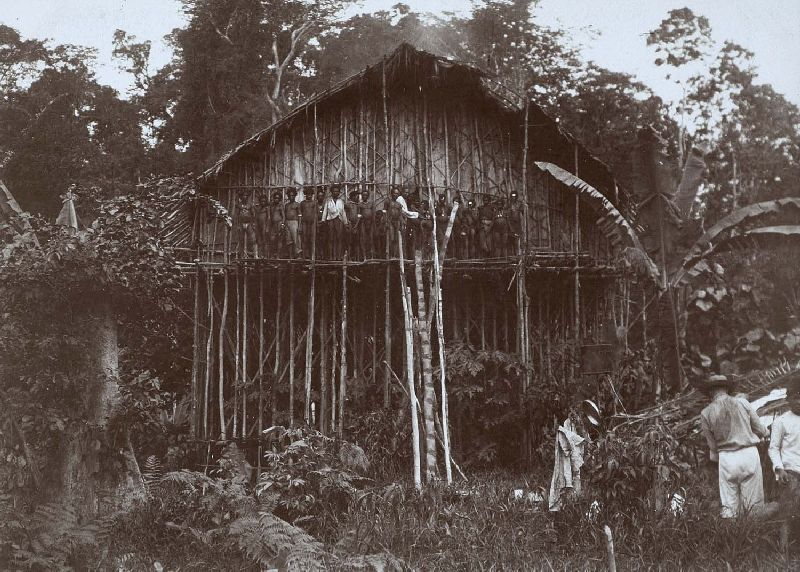
The Thousand Legs House of the Souk people, known as Manikion at the time by the Biak tribe, was photographed during the Wichmann Expedition in 1903.
