= List of incumbent regional heads and deputy regional heads in West Papua =

The following is an article about the list of Regional Heads and Deputy Regional Heads in 7 regencies/cities in West Papua who are currently still serving.

== List ==
Regency/ City	Photo of the Regent/ Mayor	Regent/ Mayor	Photo of Deputy Regent/ Mayor	Deputy Regent/ Mayor	Taking Office	End of Office (Planned)	Ref.
Fakfak; Regency List of Regents/Deputy Regents		Samaun Dahlan		Donatus Nimbitkendik	20 February 2025	20 February 2030	
Kaimana; Regency List of Regents/Deputy Regents		Hasan Achmad		Isak Waryensi	20 February 2025	20 February 2030	
Manokwari; Regency List of Regents/Deputy Regents		Hermus Indou		Mugiyono	20 February 2025	20 February 2030	
South Manokwari; Regency List of Regents/Deputy Regents		Bernard Mandacan		Mesak Inyomusi	20 February 2025	20 February 2030	
Arfak Mountains; Regency List of Regents/Deputy Regents		Dominggus Saiba		Andy Salabai	20 February 2025	20 February 2030	
Bintuni Bay; Regency List of Regents/Deputy Regents		Yohanis Manibuy		Joko Lingara	20 February 2025	20 February 2030	
Wondama Bay; Regency List of Regents/Deputy Regents		Elysa Auri		Anthonius Alex Marani	20 February 2025	20 February 2030	

Notes

- "Commencement of office" is the inauguration date at the beginning or during the current term of office. For acting regents/mayors, it is the date of appointment or extension as acting regent/mayor.
- Based on the Constitutional Court decision Number 27/PUU-XXII/2024, the Governor and Deputy Governor, Regent and Deputy Regent, and Mayor and Deputy Mayor elected in 2020 shall serve until the inauguration of the Governor and Deputy Governor, Regent and Deputy Regent, and Mayor and Deputy Mayor elected in the 2024 national simultaneous elections as long as the term of office does not exceed 5 (five) years.
