= Saweru language =

Language in Papua

Saweru
- Saweroe
- Sarwar Use
- Native to: Indonesia
- Region: Cenderawasih Bay
- Native speakers: (300 cited 1991)
- Language family: West Papuan ?: Yawan; Saweru

Language codes
- ISO 639-3: swr
- Glottolog: sawe1240

Saweru, or Saweroe, is a Papuan language spoken on Saweru Island offshore of Yapen Island. It is closely related to Yawa, of which it is sometimes considered a dialect.

== Grammar ==
Unlike Yawa, Saweru lacks an inclusive-exclusive distinction for the first person plural pronoun. Saweru has amai 'we', while Yawa has ream 'we (exclusive)' and wam 'we (inclusive)'.
