= Yawa languages =

Small language family of Indonesia

Yawan
- Yapen
- Geographic distribution: central Yapen Island, Cenderawasih Bay
- Linguistic classification: West Papuan or independent language family: Yawan
- Subdivisions: Yawa; Saweru

Language codes
- Glottolog: yawa1259
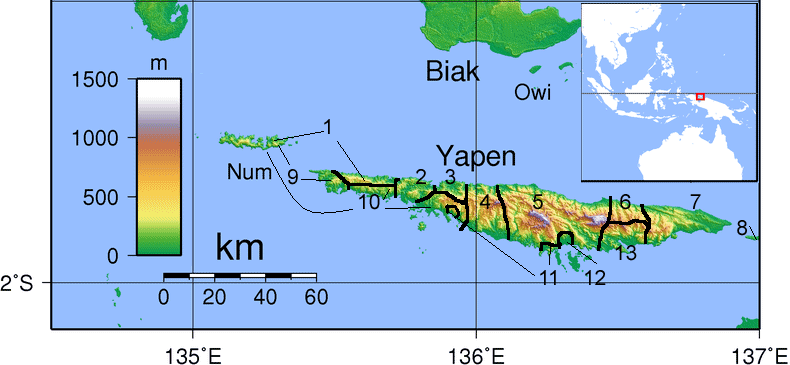

The Yawa languages, also known as Yapen languages, are a small family of two closely related Papuan languages, Yawa (or Yava) and Saweru. Due to their strong similarity, they are sometimes considered to be divergent dialects of a single language – in which case, that language would be an isolate.

They are spoken on central Yapen Island and nearby islets, in Cenderawasih Bay, Indonesian Papua, which they share with the Austronesian Yapen languages.

Yawa proper had 6000 speakers in 1987. Saweru has been variously reported: 1/ to be partially intelligible with other dialects of Yawa and to be considered a dialect of Yawa by its speakers, or 2/ to be too divergent for intelligibility and to be perceived as a separate language. Saweru is moribund, being spoken by 150 people out of an ethnic group of 300.

== Classification ==
Linguist C. L. Voorhoeve tentatively linked Yawa with the East Geelvink Bay languages in his Geelvink Bay proposal. However, the relationship would be a distant one at best, and Mark Donohue felt in 2001 that Yawa had not been shown to be related to any other language. Reesink (2005) notes resemblances with East Bird's Head languages. Recently Malcolm Ross made a tentative proposal that Yawa might be part of an Extended West Papuan language phylum. The pronominal resemblances are most apparent when comparing proto-Yawa to the East Bird's Head language Meax:

	I	thou	s/he	you
Proto-Yawa	*rei	*uein	*wepi	*waya
Meax	didif	bua	ofa	iwa

d~r, b~w, we~o, p~f are all common sound correspondences.

Ethnologue (2009, 2013) takes this a step further, and places Yawa within West Papuan itself.

Foley (2018) classifies Yawa separately as an independent language family.

== Typological overview ==
Yawa languages are split intransitive languages, which are typologically highly uncommon in New Guinea.

Unlike the Sepik languages, Taiap, and other languages of northern New Guinea, masculine rather than feminine is the unmarked gender, whereas Taiap and the Sepik languages treat feminine as the default unmarked gender. In Yawa languages, feminine is relegated mostly for animate nouns with obvious female sexual characteristics.

== Basic vocabulary ==
Basic vocabulary of the Yapen languages Yawa and Saweru listed in Foley (2018). The pairs are not necessarily cognate. This sample suggests that the linguistic distance between the two languages is in fact greater than the typical distance between two dialects of a same language.

Yapen family basic vocabulary
gloss	Yawa	Saweru
'bird'	insani/ani	aani
'blood'	mavu	maandi
'bone'	pae	yai(yae)
'breast'	ukam	inawam
'ear'	amarikoam	nama(komu)
'eat'	raiʃ	andai
'egg'	kami	aanimpenam
'eye'	ami	name
'fire'	tanam	naona
'go'	poto	ta
'ground'	kakopa	kakofa
'hair'	akarivuiny	neyaribiri
'hear'	ranaun	nau
'leg'	ajo	inayo
'louse'	eme	emo
'man'	anya	rama
'moon'	embae	emba
'name'	tame	inatama
'one'	ntabo	baintawe
'path, road'	unandi	nar
'see'	raen	eni
'stone'	oraman	toman
'sun'	uma	uma
'tongue'	aunan	nawanana
'tooth'	atomokan	natu
'tree'	nyoe mot	nawao
'two'	jirum, rurum	wai dinu
'water'	mana	manaa
'woman'	wanya	ruama

The following basic vocabulary words are from Voorhoeve (1975), as cited in the Trans-New Guinea database:

gloss	Yawa
head	akari
hair	bwin
eye	nami
tooth	atu
leg	najo
louse	eme
dog	make
pig	bugwe
bird	insane
egg	kami
blood	madi
bone	pae
skin	kea
tree	nyo
man	ana
sun	uma
water	karu (?)
fire	tanam
stone	oram
name	tam
eat	rais
one	utabo
two	jiru
