= Kuwani language =

Papuan language of Indonesia

Kuwani
- Native to: Indonesia
- Region: West Papua
- Language family: West Papuan?: Bird's Head; West Bird's Head; Kuwani

Language codes
- ISO 639-3: None (mis)
- Linguist List: qqz
- Glottolog: None

Kuwani is a poorly attested Papuan language of the Bird's Head Peninsula of New Guinea. It is attested only from a single word list, and even its exact location is unknown.

== Comparison ==
Smits and Voorhoeve (1998) assumed it to be equivalent to Kalabra, but there are significant lexical differences. Some lexical differences between Kuwani and Kalabra are given below.

gloss	Kuwani	Kalabra
‘ear’	indibit	difitlas
‘eye’	inzibun	sifogo
‘hand’	owani	defo
‘1SG’	tetike	tet
