= Meyado =

- District
- Location in West Papua
- Coordinates: 1°38′21.9228″S 133°8′38.75424″E
- Country: Indonesia
- Province: West Papua
- Regency: Bintuni Bay

Area
  - Total: 743.69 km^{2} (287.14 sq mi)

Population (2020)
  - Total: 1,405
  - Density: 1.889/km^{2} (4.893/sq mi)
- Time zone: UTC+9 (WIT)
- Postal Code: 98153

Meyado is an administrative district in Bintuni Bay Regency, West Papua, Indonesia.
