= Anggi Airport =

Anggi Airport Bandar Udara Anggi
- IATA: AGD; ICAO: WAUA

Summary
- Location: Anggi, Indonesia
- Elevation AMSL: 7,054 ft (2,150 m)
- Coordinates: 01°19′48″S 133°54′40″E

Map
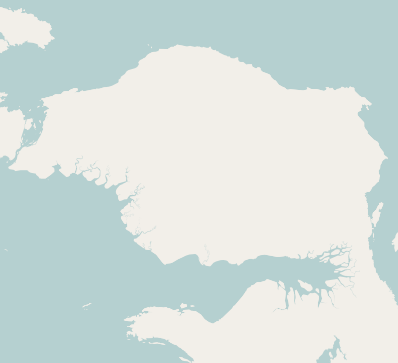
- Location in Bird's Head Peninsula Location in West Papua

Runways
Direction	Length		Surface
Direction	ft	m	Surface
04/22		1,200	Concrete

Anggi Airport (Indonesian: Bandar Udara Anggi) (IATA: AGD, ICAO: WAUA) is a domestic airport serving the town of serving Anggi in Arfak Mountains Regency, West Papua, Indonesia. The airport is operated by the Technical Implementation Unit of the Directorate General of Civil Aviation.

== History ==
In October 2019, President Joko Widodo visited the Arfak Mountains Regency and stated that the central government would continue developing transportation infrastructure in the region. During the visit, he requested two years to develop the airport and improve regional accessibility.

In 2020, the Arfak Mountains Regency Government announced plans to extend the airport runway to 1,500 metres to accommodate larger aircraft and improve transportation access to the regency.

In 2023, Arfak Mountains Regent Yosias Saroy stated that Anggi Airport was ready for operation and was awaiting airlines to begin scheduled flight services.

On 15 January 2024, West Papua Governor Ali Baham Temongmere inaugurated subsidized pioneer flights operated by Susi Air. The Anggi–Manokwari route was among the twelve routes served.

== Facilities ==
Anggi Airport is an airport operated by the Directorate General of Civil Aviation. The airport has a runway measuring 950 x 23 metres, a taxiway measuring 111 x 15 metres, and an apron measuring 60 x 45 metres.

== Airlines and destinations ==
Airlines	Destinations
Susi Air	Manokwari
