= Moskona language =

Meax language spoken in Indonesia

Meninggo
- Moskona
- Native to: Indonesia
- Region: Teluk Bintuni Regency, Bird's Head Peninsula
- Native speakers: (8,000 cited 1996)
- Language family: West Papuan: East Bird's Head; Mantion–Meax; Meax; Meninggo

Language codes
- ISO 639-3: mtj
- Glottolog: mosk1236
- Coordinates: 1.62°S 133.15°E

Meninggo, or Moskona or Sabena, is a Papuan language spoken in Teluk Bintuni Regency on the north coast of West Papua, Indonesia.

== Distribution ==
In Teluk Bintuni Regency, ethnic Moskona people are located in Moskona Timur District (in Sumuy, Mesna, and Igomu villages), Mardey District, Masyeta District, Jagiro District, Moyeba District, and Mesna District.
