= AGD =

AGD may refer to:

- AGD Interactive, a non-profit software company
- Academy of General Dentistry
- Agarabi language
- Airgun Designs, a manufacturer of paintball equipment
- Alpha Gamma Delta, a North American college women's fraternity
- The Ambiguously Gay Duo, an animated television series
- Amoebic gill disease
- Anggi Airport in West Papua, Indonesia (IATA airport code AGD)
- Anogenital distance
- Association for Genome Diagnostics
- United States Army Adjutant General's Corps
