= Minggot =

- Location in West Papua and Indonesia Minggot (Indonesia)
- Coordinates: 1°3′31.2228″S 133°30′8.2512″E
- Country: Indonesia
- Province: West Papua
- Regency: Arfak Mountains Regency
- District: Hingk District
- Elevation: 8,100 ft (2,470 m)

Population (2010)
  - Total: 169
- Time zone: UTC+9 (Indonesia Eastern Standard Time)

Minggot is a village in Hingk district, Arfak Mountains Regency in West Papua province, Indonesia. Its population is 169.

== Climate ==
Minggot has a cold subtropical highland climate (Cfb) with heavy rainfall year-round.

Climate data for Minggot
Month	Jan	Feb	Mar	Apr	May	Jun	Jul	Aug	Sep	Oct	Nov	Dec	Year
Mean daily maximum °C (°F)	19.6 (67.3)	19.6 (67.3)	19.1 (66.4)	18.7 (65.7)	17.9 (64.2)	17.0 (62.6)	16.1 (61.0)	16.0 (60.8)	17.3 (63.1)	19.1 (66.4)	19.6 (67.3)	19.7 (67.5)	18.3 (65.0)
Daily mean °C (°F)	14.9 (58.8)	15.1 (59.2)	14.9 (58.8)	14.7 (58.5)	14.4 (57.9)	13.9 (57.0)	13.2 (55.8)	13.0 (55.4)	13.7 (56.7)	14.7 (58.5)	14.9 (58.8)	15.1 (59.2)	14.4 (57.9)
Mean daily minimum °C (°F)	10.3 (50.5)	10.6 (51.1)	10.8 (51.4)	10.7 (51.3)	10.9 (51.6)	10.8 (51.4)	10.4 (50.7)	10.1 (50.2)	10.1 (50.2)	10.3 (50.5)	10.2 (50.4)	10.5 (50.9)	10.5 (50.8)
Average precipitation mm (inches)	281 (11.1)	295 (11.6)	269 (10.6)	301 (11.9)	327 (12.9)	306 (12.0)	290 (11.4)	276 (10.9)	255 (10.0)	235 (9.3)	238 (9.4)	279 (11.0)	3,352 (132.1)
Source: Climate-Data.org
