= Usti, West Papua =

Usti
- Village
- Location in West Papua Location in Western New Guinea Location in Indonesia
- Coordinates: 1°22′17.9″S 133°49′17.4″E
- Country: Indonesia
- Province: West Papua
- Regency: Pegunungan Arfak Regency
- District: Membey
- Elevation: 8,097 ft (2,468 m)

Population (2010)
  - Total: 163
- Time zone: UTC+9 (Indonesia Eastern Standard Time)

Usti is a village in Membey district, Pegunungan Arfak Regency in West Papua province, Indonesia. Its population is 163.

== Climate ==
Usti has a subtropical highland climate (Cfb) with heavy rainfall year-round.

Climate data for Usti
Month	Jan	Feb	Mar	Apr	May	Jun	Jul	Aug	Sep	Oct	Nov	Dec	Year
Mean daily maximum °C (°F)	19.7 (67.5)	19.6 (67.3)	19.2 (66.6)	18.7 (65.7)	17.8 (64.0)	16.9 (62.4)	16.0 (60.8)	16.0 (60.8)	17.3 (63.1)	19.0 (66.2)	19.5 (67.1)	19.8 (67.6)	18.3 (64.9)
Daily mean °C (°F)	14.9 (58.8)	14.9 (58.8)	14.9 (58.8)	14.7 (58.5)	14.3 (57.7)	13.7 (56.7)	13.1 (55.6)	12.9 (55.2)	13.6 (56.5)	14.5 (58.1)	14.7 (58.5)	15.1 (59.2)	14.3 (57.7)
Mean daily minimum °C (°F)	10.2 (50.4)	10.3 (50.5)	10.7 (51.3)	10.7 (51.3)	10.8 (51.4)	10.6 (51.1)	10.3 (50.5)	9.9 (49.8)	9.9 (49.8)	10.1 (50.2)	10.0 (50.0)	10.4 (50.7)	10.3 (50.6)
Average rainfall mm (inches)	283 (11.1)	300 (11.8)	269 (10.6)	296 (11.7)	317 (12.5)	297 (11.7)	281 (11.1)	268 (10.6)	253 (10.0)	237 (9.3)	241 (9.5)	279 (11.0)	3,321 (130.9)
Source: Climate-Data.org
