= Kalabra language =

Papuan language

Kalabra
- Beraur, Moi Klabra
- Native to: Indonesia
- Region: Beraur District, Sorong Regency, Southwest Papua
- Ethnicity: Moi Klabra
- Native speakers: (3,300 cited 2000)
- Language family: West Papuan?: Bird's Head; West Bird's Head; Kalabra

Language codes
- ISO 639-3: kzz
- Glottolog: kala1256
- Coordinates: 1.43°S 131.62°E

Kalabra (Beraur) is a Papuan language of the Moi Klabra tribe in Bird's Head Peninsula of New Guinea. It is closest to Tehit. Kalabra is spoken in Beraur District, Sorong Regency, Southwest Papua.
