= Tomu =

- District
- Location of the town in Western New Guinea
- Coordinates: 2.2009°S 132.98097°E
- Country: Indonesia
- Province: West Papua
- Regency: Bintuni Bay

Area
  - Total: 572.00 km^{2} (220.85 sq mi)

Population (2023)
  - Total: 3,420
  - Density: 5.98/km^{2} (15.5/sq mi)
- Time zone: UTC+9 (WIT)
- Postal Code: 98156

Tomu is an administrative district in Bintuni Bay Regency, West Papua, Indonesia.
