= Cigera =

- Location in West Papua and Indonesia Cigera (Indonesia)
- Coordinates: 1°23′51.0″S 133°40′26.6″E
- Country: Indonesia
- Province: West Papua
- Regency: Pegunungan Arfak Regency
- District: Didohu District
- Elevation: 7,293 ft (2,223 m)

Population (2010)
  - Total: 82
- Time zone: UTC+9 (Indonesia Eastern Standard Time)

Cigera is a village in Didohu District, Pegunungan Arfak Regency in West Papua province, Indonesia. Its population is 82 in 2010.

== Climate ==
Cigera has a subtropical highland climate (Cfb) with heavy rainfall year-round.

Climate data for Cigera
| Month | Jan | Feb | Mar | Apr | May | Jun | Jul | Aug | Sep | Oct | Nov | Dec | Year |
|---|---|---|---|---|---|---|---|---|---|---|---|---|---|
| Mean daily maximum °C (°F) | 20.9 (69.6) | 20.7 (69.3) | 20.4 (68.7) | 19.9 (67.8) | 19.2 (66.6) | 18.2 (64.8) | 17.4 (63.3) | 17.4 (63.3) | 18.6 (65.5) | 20.2 (68.4) | 20.7 (69.3) | 20.9 (69.6) | 19.5 (67.2) |
| Daily mean °C (°F) | 16.2 (61.2) | 16.2 (61.2) | 16.2 (61.2) | 15.9 (60.6) | 15.6 (60.1) | 15.0 (59.0) | 14.5 (58.1) | 14.3 (57.7) | 14.9 (58.8) | 15.8 (60.4) | 16.1 (61.0) | 16.3 (61.3) | 15.6 (60.0) |
| Mean daily minimum °C (°F) | 11.6 (52.9) | 11.8 (53.2) | 12.1 (53.8) | 12.0 (53.6) | 12.1 (53.8) | 11.9 (53.4) | 11.7 (53.1) | 11.3 (52.3) | 11.3 (52.3) | 11.5 (52.7) | 11.5 (52.7) | 11.8 (53.2) | 11.7 (53.1) |
| Average rainfall mm (inches) | 278 (10.9) | 292 (11.5) | 266 (10.5) | 293 (11.5) | 310 (12.2) | 289 (11.4) | 269 (10.6) | 257 (10.1) | 243 (9.6) | 228 (9.0) | 232 (9.1) | 272 (10.7) | 3,229 (127.1) |
Source: Climate-Data.org
