= Biscoop =

District in West Papua, Indonesia

- District
- Location in West Papua
- Coordinates: 1.5473714°S 133.5148699°E
- Country: Indonesia
- Province: West Papua
- Regency: Bintuni Bay

Area
  - Total: 789.44 km^{2} (304.80 sq mi)

Population (2020)
  - Total: 712
  - Density: 0.902/km^{2} (2.34/sq mi)
- Time zone: UTC+9 (WIT)
- Postal Code: 98161

Biscoop is an administrative district in Bintuni Bay Regency, West Papua, Indonesia.
