= Ransiki =

Ransiki Indonesian: Ransiki
- District
- Location in West Papua Province Location in Western New Guinea Location in Indonesia
- Coordinates: 1°30′S 134°10′E
- Country: Indonesia
- Region: Western New Guinea
- Province: West Papua
- Regency: South Manokwari Regency

Area
  - Total: 178.61 km^{2} (68.96 sq mi)
- Elevation: 40 m (130 ft)

Population (mid 2024 estimate)
  - Total: 18,303
  - Density: 102.47/km^{2} (265.41/sq mi)
- Time zone: UTC+7 (Indonesia Eastern Time)

Ransiki (Indonesian: Ransiki) is a small town and also an administrative district (distrik) of 178.61 km^{2} which includes that town, in the Indonesian province of West Papua. The town is the administrative seat of the South Manokwari Regency. In 2010, there were 7,683 people in Ransiki District, which rose to 16,245 at the 2020 census and was officially estimated at 18,303 in mid 2024. The town is served by Ransiki Airport.

== History ==
During World War II a ship sank off the Ransiki coastline.

== Climate ==
Ransiki has a tropical rainforest climate with moderate to heavy rainfall year-round.

Climate data for Ransiki
Month	Jan	Feb	Mar	Apr	May	Jun	Jul	Aug	Sep	Oct	Nov	Dec	Year
Mean daily maximum °C (°F)	30.9 (87.6)	30.7 (87.3)	30.6 (87.1)	30.8 (87.4)	30.8 (87.4)	30.3 (86.5)	30.0 (86.0)	29.9 (85.8)	30.4 (86.7)	31.0 (87.8)	31.3 (88.3)	31.2 (88.2)	30.7 (87.2)
Daily mean °C (°F)	26.9 (80.4)	26.9 (80.4)	26.9 (80.4)	27.0 (80.6)	27.0 (80.6)	26.6 (79.9)	26.4 (79.5)	26.3 (79.3)	26.6 (79.9)	26.9 (80.4)	27.3 (81.1)	27.2 (81.0)	26.8 (80.3)
Mean daily minimum °C (°F)	23.0 (73.4)	23.2 (73.8)	23.3 (73.9)	23.3 (73.9)	23.3 (73.9)	23.0 (73.4)	22.8 (73.0)	22.7 (72.9)	22.8 (73.0)	22.9 (73.2)	23.3 (73.9)	23.2 (73.8)	23.1 (73.5)
Average rainfall mm (inches)	160 (6.3)	152 (6.0)	142 (5.6)	149 (5.9)	111 (4.4)	128 (5.0)	115 (4.5)	107 (4.2)	100 (3.9)	96 (3.8)	110 (4.3)	136 (5.4)	1,506 (59.3)
Source: Climate-Data.org
