= Tahota =

District in West Papua, Indonesia

- District
- Location in West Papua Province
- Coordinates: 1°51′4.4514″S 133°51′29.3137″E
- Country: Indonesia
- Province: West Papua
- Regency: South Manokwari

Area
  - Total: 395.05 km^{2} (152.53 sq mi)

Population (mid 2024 estimate)
  - Total: 1,091
  - Density: 2.762/km^{2} (7.153/sq mi)
- Time zone: UTC+9 (WIT)
- Postal Code: 98325

Tahota is an administrative district (distrik) in South Manokwari Regency, West Papua Province of Indonesia. The administrative centre is in the village of Yermatun.
