= West Bird's Head languages =

Family of Papuan languages

West Bird's Head
- Geographic distribution: West Papua
- Linguistic classification: West Papuan: West–Central Bird's Head; West Bird's Head

Language codes
- Glottolog: west1493

West Bird's Head languages are a small family of poorly documented Papuan languages spoken on the Bird's Head Peninsula of New Guinea.

The West Bird's Head (WBH) family is a well-defined family of six languages spoken at the western end of the Bird's Head Peninsula of New Guinea and the eastern part of the island of Salawati opposite the Bird's Head's western shore. Based on pronominal evidence, they appear to be related to the North Halmahera languages of North Maluku.

== Language contact ==
West Bird's Head languages have been heavily influenced by Austronesian languages. Austronesian influence is evident in SVO word order (as opposed to SOV word order in most other Papuan language families), pronouns, numerals, and other typological features.

== Languages ==
- West Bird's Head
  - Seget–Moi (Sele Strait):
    - Seget
    - Moi
  - South West Bird's Head (Seremuk River):
    - Tehit (or Kaibus; the most populous, with 10,000 speakers)
    - Kalabra (close to Tehit)
    - Moraid
  - ? Kuwani

Kuwani is attested only from a single word list, but is clearly distinct.

These languages cannot be easily linked to other families of the Bird's Head Peninsula. They have been plausibly connected to the geographically close North Halmahera (NH) family, a relationship considered clear by Reesink 1998; however, the evidence does not appear to be conclusive. In particular, the available lexical evidence is flimsy, as noted by Holton and Klamer (2018). On the other hand, the geographical proximity of the two families lends credibility to this proposal. The connection between WBH and NH was first proposed by H.K.J. Cowan (1957), and further discussed by C.L. Voorhoeve (1987, 1994).

A link between WBH and the isolates Abun and Maybrat has also been proposed (Wichmann 2013, Flassy 2002).

== Vocabulary comparison ==
The following basic vocabulary words are from Voorhoeve (1975), as cited in the Trans-New Guinea database.

The words cited constitute translation equivalents, whether they are cognate (e.g. kalen, kelem, kele for “bird”) or not (e.g. tolok, begu, niwi for “egg”).

gloss	Kalabra	Moi	Moraid	Seget	Tehit
head	safas	sawa	sawag	sadus	sam
hair	sadin	sagin	sadie	salas	gen
eye	sifoko	suo	sgolfun	si	tsifon
tooth	tela	efek	etəla	gifek	-hek
leg	terit	telek	ere	cek	ndeit
louse	on	sayam	oŋ	wut	hain
dog	houn	ofun	ŋouŋ	awfu	
pig	beak	baik	mimula	mon	
bird	kalen	kelem	kele	klem	klen
egg	weko	tolok	begu	niwi	mesyen
blood	hein	sdam	hijeg	sədam	hon
bone	kodus	kodus	kedoq	nədus	honim
skin	falak	-kesik	balg	nensiek	falek
tree	kout	ouk	pelu	bua	molom
man	nadele	(ne) dala	dli	nanla	naadla
sun	pun	dewe	telu	tale	pun
water	kala	kala	kəla	kla	sem
fire	sal	yak	salp	yap	
stone	amak	kwak	amp	kuat	amak
name	nakadi	kedi	numhamone	nomo	kendim
eat	atkaren	wak	nagrimi	nate	atni
one	mere	mele	merəh	məre	mre
two	lap	ali	telok	ali	la; lauh
