= Hatam language =

Language spoken in Indonesia

Hatam
- Native to: Papua, Indonesia
- Region: Eastern Bird's Head
- Native speakers: (16,000 cited 1993)
- Language family: West Papuan: East Bird's Head (?); Hatam–Mansim; Hatam
- Dialects: Moi (Moire); Tinam; Miriei; Adihup; Uran

Language codes
- ISO 639-3: had
- Glottolog: hata1243
- ELP: Hatam
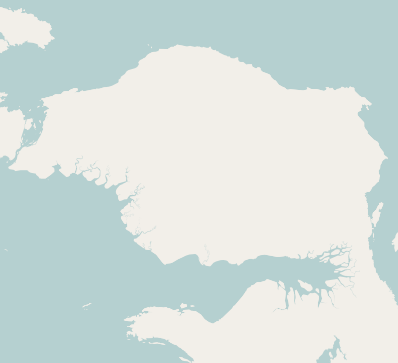
- Coordinates: 1.14°S 134.04°E

Hatam (also spelled Hattam, Atam) is a divergent language spoken on the island of New Guinea, specifically in the Indonesian province of West Papua.

== Classification ==
Apart from Mansim (Borai), formerly listed as a dialect, Hatam is not closely related to any other language, and though Ross (2005) tentatively assigned it to the West Papuan languages, based on similarities in pronouns, Ethnologue and Glottolog list it as a language isolate or small independent family.

== Distribution ==
Hatam is spoken on the island of New Guinea in the following regencies in the Indonesian province of West Papua:

- Pegunungan Arfak Regency: Menyambouw District, Anggi District, Anggi Dida District, Catubouw District, and Hingk District
- Manokwari Regency: Manokwari Barat District, Manokwari Selatan District, Tanah Rubuh District, Warmare District, Prafi District
- Manokwari Selatan Regency: Oransbari District (Masabui 1 and Masabui 2 villages) and Ransiki District (Sabri village)

== Phonology ==
The phonology of the Hatam language is listed below. In free form, both consonant and vowel phonemes can range to different sounds.

Consonants
| | | Labial | Alveolar | Palatal | Velar | Glottal |
|---|---|---|---|---|---|---|
| Plosive | voiceless | p | t | c | k | |
| Plosive | voiced | b | d | ɟ | ɡ | |
| Plosive | geminated | pː | tː | | kː | |
| Nasal | voiced | m | n | ɲ | ŋ | |
| Nasal | geminated | mː | nː | | | |
| Fricative | | | s | | | h |
| Liquid | | | ɾ | | | |
| Semivowel | | w | | j | | |

| Phoneme | Allophones |
|---|---|
| /p/ | [p, pʰ, pɸ, ɸ] |
| /t/ | [t, tʰ] |
| /c/ | [c, cʰ] |
| /k/ | [k, kʰ, kx] |
| /ɡ/ | [ɡ, k, ɡː] |
| /ɟ/ | [ɟ, ɟː] |
| /d/ | [d, t] |
| /b/ | [b, p, bː] |
| /ɾ/ | [ɾ, l, lː] |

Vowels
| | Front | Central | Back |
|---|---|---|---|
| Close | i | | u |
| Mid | ɛ | | ɔ |
| Open | | a | |

| Phoneme | Allophones |
|---|---|
| /i/ | [i, ɪ, ə] |
| /ɛ/ | [ɛ, e] |
| /a/ | [ä, a, ɐ] |
| /ɔ/ | [ɔ, o] |
