= Kamundan =

District in West Papua, Indonesia

- District
- Interactive map of Kamundan
- Coordinates: 2.2379440°S 132.6766796°E
- Country: Indonesia
- Province: West Papua
- Regency: Bintuni Bay

Area
  - Total: 572.00 km^{2} (220.85 sq mi)

Population (2023)
  - Total: 1,151
  - Density: 2.012/km^{2} (5.212/sq mi)
- Time zone: UTC+9 (WIT)
- Postal Code: 98152

Kamundan is an administrative district in Bintuni Bay Regency, West Papua, Indonesia.
