= Yawa language =

Papuan language spoken in Indonesia

Yawa
- Native to: Indonesia
- Region: Cenderawasih Bay
- Native speakers: 10,000 (2011)
- Language family: West Papuan ?: Yawan; Yawa

Language codes
- ISO 639-3: yva
- Glottolog: nucl1454

Yawa (Yava) is the Papuan language of central Yapen Island in Geelvink (Cenderawasih) Bay, Indonesia. Alternative names are Iau (not the same as Iau language), Mantembu, Mora (not Mora language), Turu, and Yapanani.

== Phonology ==
=== Vowels ===
	Front	Central	Back
Close	i		u
Mid	e		o
Open		a	

=== Consonants ===
	Labial	Alveolar	Palatal	Velar
Nasal	m	n	ɲ	
Plosive	p	t		k
Plosive	b	d	ɟ	
Fricative		s	ʃ	
Trill		r		
Approximant	w		j	
