= Aroba =

- District
- Location of the town in Western New Guinea
- Coordinates: 2°56′0″S 133°35′0″E
- Country: Indonesia
- Province: West Papua
- Regency: Bintuni Bay

Area
  - Total: 1.074 km^{2} (0.415 sq mi)

Population (2018)
  - Total: 2,974
  - Density: 2,769/km^{2} (7,172/sq mi)
- Time zone: UTC+9 (WIT)

Aroba is an administrative district in Bintuni Bay Regency, West Papua, Indonesia.
