= Muturi =

- Village
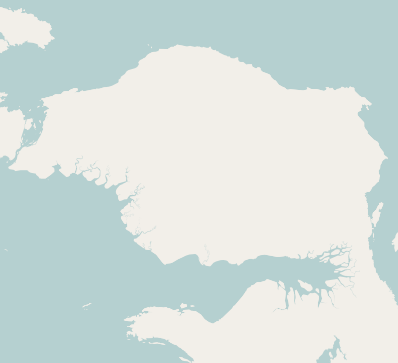
- Location of the town in the Bird's Head Peninsula
- Coordinates: 2°11′0″S 133°41′0″E
- Country: Indonesia
- Province: West Papua
- Regency: Teluk Bintuni
- Time zone: UTC+9 (WIT)

Muturi is a village (kampung) in Bintuni Bay Regency, West Papua, Indonesia. It is located on the southeastern coast of the Bird's Head Peninsula. The Muturi River flows through the vicinity.

There are significant oil reserves in the area and Muturi is subject to drilling from ARCO and BG. There is a deep-water oil terminal at Muturi, roughly three miles from the entrance to the Muturi River. It has a 18.3 metres (60 ft) long T-shaped pier which can serve vessels up to 30,000 tonnes. In 2017 a Missile Detachment was established at Muturi with the objective of protecting state assets to conduct oil and gas mining operations in the area.

Despite the existence of oil reserves, access to clean water has long been a problem in Muturi. Attempts to build wells in the area were a failure. In 2017 the 98th Manunggal Army launched a community plan to build a small water reservoir, planted underground, which can be used by the local church and school.
