= Mantion–Meax languages =

Language family of New Guinea

Mantion–Meax Mantion–Meyah
- East Bird's Head
- Geographic distribution: Papua
- Linguistic classification: West Papuan?: (extended) East Bird's Head; Mantion–Meax Mantion–Meyah
- Subdivisions: Mantion; Meyah

Language codes
- Glottolog: east1459
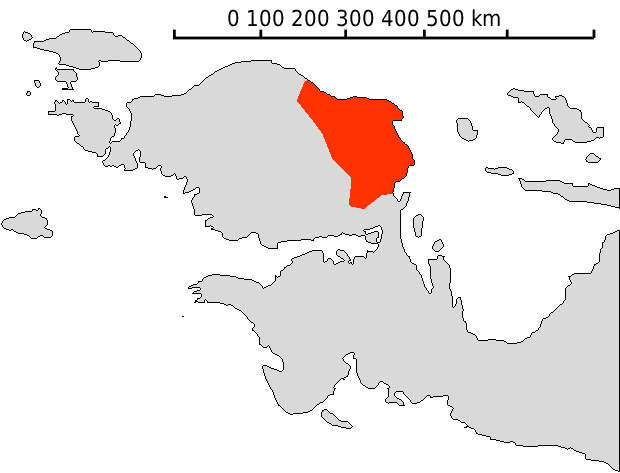
- East Bird's Head languages (in red)

The Mantion–Meax, Mantion–Meyah, or (South) East Bird's Head languages are a language family of three languages in the "Bird's Head Peninsula" of western New Guinea, spoken by all together 20,000 people.

== Classification ==
East Bird's Head stock (4 languages)

- Mantion (Manikion, Sougb)
- Meyah family: Meyah (Meax), Meninggo (Moskona)
- Irires

== Pronouns ==
The pronouns Ross reconstructs for the proto-language (Usher's Southeast Bird's Head) are:

	Number		
Person	Singular	Plural	
Person	Singular	exclusive	inclusive
1st	*da, *di-	*meme, *me-	*mimi, *mi-
2nd	*ba, *bi-	*ia, *i-	
3rd	*e, *-	*rua, *ri-	

== Basic vocabulary ==
Basic vocabulary among East Bird's Head languages (Meyah, Moskona, Sougb, Hatam, Mansim) listed in Holton & Klamer (2018). The sets are not necessarily cognate.

East Bird's Head family basic vocabulary
gloss	Meyah	Moskona	Sougb	Hatam	Mansim
‘bird’	mem	mem	ba	hab	waw
‘louse’	mej	mej	mem	mem	
‘one’	egens	erges	hom	gom	wom
‘night’	motu	mot	loba	mmun	
‘I’	didif	dif	dan	dani	danu

Additional East Bird's Head basic vocabulary quoted by Holton & Klamer (2018) from Miedema & Reesink (2004: 34) and (Reesink 2005: 202), showing diverse non-cognate vocabulary across different branches:

Additional East Bird's Head basic vocabulary
gloss	Meyah	Moskona	Sougb	Hatam
arm/hand	etma	etma	s(i)ra	ndab
leg/foot	aki	egak/oko	ohora	mig
house	mod	mod	tu	ig
good	oufa	ojfa	eigouh	kei
dog	mes	mes	mihi	nsien
pig	mek	mek	hwej	nab
chicken	mongkukar	memkoar	berougb	guri
louse	mej	mej	mem	mem
water/river	mei	mij	uhu	nyei
banana		meni	nej	wida

=== Swadesh list ===
Below is a 192-word modified Swadesh list for the East Bird's Head languages (Schapper, Syufi & Arnold 2026: 260–266):

gloss	Irires	Meyah	Moskona	Sougb
all	ojs	nomnaga	romreg	augwan
and	tekun	d͡ʒera	dokun	dara
animal	mejod	marska	marsa	aremeta
ashes	metewew	moŋkoru	mofra	mor
at	gij	gid͡ʒ	d͡ʒig	se
back	ad͡ʒmeg	ed͡ʒmeg	ed͡ʒmeg	idgo
bad	asxaj	oska	oskur	ecgu
bark	mer afox	mega ofos	merga owos	sogo mos
because	tenaf	d͡ʒeska	esxa	dau
belly	adog	otkonu	otkon	nuhwa
big	atew	eteb	eteu	goɟi
bird	mem	mem	mem	ba
bite	ask	eska	eska	au
black	axid	axta	axta	ogor
blood	aguf	ogufu	ofuga	mogwihi
blow	of	oft͡ʃ	oft͡ʃa	ouhw
bone	or	ofora	oforna	mohori
breathe	ojf	axamaxa	emsa	mena aic
burn	max et	max et	merax et	ait
child	as	oforoka	eferiok	meh
cloud	moswad͡ʒ	mot͡ʃgod͡ʒ ofog	merofog	umer
cold	aed͡ʒ	meifirna	mifirna	emtereta
come	anin	en	en	en
correct	tenen	tenten	det͡ʃir	indeiɟ
count	atog	ofosut	osot	ecic
cut	ed͡ʒ	eris	ersa	ogod
day	mow	mona	mona	lona
die	ew	agos	ogos	omom
dig	awan	ed͡ʒi	ow	ogo
dirty	asimsik	axtaxta	axtaxta	ogor
dog	met͡ʃ	mes	mes	mihi
drink	ed͡ʒ	ed͡ʒ	et	ek
dry	axixir	efed͡ʒ	efed͡ʒ	erouhw
dull	amuj	ofod͡ʒ	ofod͡ʒ	okta
dust	afenok	mebi ofou	mou ofui	aremoslos
ear	at͡ʃuj	osu	osui	ums
earth	mow	mebi	mou	cinogo
eat	et	et	et	et
egg	mem afoj	mem ofou	mem ofui	mougb
eye	aded	eiteid͡ʒ	eited͡ʒ	airesi
fall	at͡ʃir	esiri	esir	obsara
far	moisam	jes	masen	gusi
fat	afes	efes	ewes	meriɟ
father	mak	meka	mekeu	meina
fear	amas	emesa	emesa	ahau
feather	afed͡ʒ	efed͡ʒ	efed͡ʒ	modi
few	afirx	egekegka	ergakak	gurereito
fight	emk	rimedima	imedima	esim
fire	max	max	merax	smougb
fish	meŋomej	mos	mos	hosei
five	sind͡ʒ	t͡ʃind͡ʒa	t͡ʃid͡ʒa	serɡem
float	ok	ofka	etuk	eikbib
flow	aj	ejax	eja	eh
flower	mer afok	marfok	marok	meric
fly	of	ofu	of	ohw
fog	moswad͡ʒ	mot͡ʃgod͡ʒ	mot͡ʃked͡ʒa	lohos moro
foot	apek	aki	egak	ohora
four	toxur	toxkuru	taxgur	hogu
fruit	afew	ofos	owos	mera
give	at	eita	eita	eic
good	at͡ʃmap	oufamofa	oifomof	eigouhw
grass	meŋgor er	marfenen	marefen	arec
green	afrax	ofraxa	ofraxa	augweda
guts	atewen	otkonu efesa	otkon ewes	menuhwa
hair	afed͡ʒ	efed͡ʒi	efed͡ʒ	modi
hand	atim	etma	etma	mesira
he	ifo, afo	ofa	ofa	en
head	awis	ebirfaga	ebir	mougt
hear	eg	eg	eg	ouman
heart	amewed	efemebi	efembed͡ʒ	medoc
heavy	akum	okum	okum	ogom
here	kikef	kef	d͡ʒikef	suggini
hit	emk	obu	obui	ogod
hold	arosud͡ʒ	agei	orusked͡ʒ	os
how	tenaf	teinefa	tinefa	dagiro
hunt	obt͡ʃ	okub	okuk	ocir
husband	maxin	maxina	maxina	mesuwa
I	idif	didif	dif	dan
if	tnaf	erek	ekek	sug
in	gid͡ʒ	gid͡ʒ	d͡ʒig	se
kill	emk	agob	ogou	ogod
know	ad͡ʒinag	ed͡ʒginaga	ed͡ʒgen	ecinaga
lake	meren	meren	meren	mohu
laugh	atitiw	otut	oitut	obohuba
leaf	afej	efei	efi	mehi
left	merg	egris	erga	medgi
leg	apek	aki	egak	ohora
lie	ax	ax	ax	atouda
live	aker	eker	eker	mena agau
liver	afor	odou	odui	medoc mei
long	agow	aksa	aksa	agas
louse	mad͡ʒ	med͡ʒ	med͡ʒ	mem
man	meŋgoron	ona	orna	giɟi
many	aromat	ofoukou	ognunui	einjana
meat	afog	ofogu	ofoga	mog
mother	mot͡ʃ	mosu	mosu	meim
mountain	memag	memaga	memeg	men
mouth	ox	awesi	oxes	mers
name	afap	ofoka	owoka	moho
narrow	oxog	emeinma	okut͡ʃkok	einjim
near	awud	doida	etkebra	deinjor
neck	orp	orukaga	orkos	mergo mei
new	afan	efeinax	efenirax	menau
night	mot	motu	mot	loba
nose	at͡ʃum	osum	osum	mebes
not	gur	guru	gura	ero
one	afims	egens	erges	hom
other	amnej	egema	ergem	gus
person	isosk	osnok	osnok	sud
play	axat͡ʃen	axaisomu	osioma	ei mumc
pull	akuj	oku	okuj	eic
push	aduj	edei	ed	oun
rain	mot͡ʃ	mos	mas	los
red	akner	ekeni	ekena	ahani
right	tenen	ognosk	orod͡ʒud͡ʒ	misen
river	mej	mei	mi	duhu mem
road	merod͡ʒ	morod͡ʒu	morod͡ʒ	ucina
root	afow	ofom	ofom	sogo mom
rope	mefun	mofun	mofun	aikdaga
rotten	amp	emba	emba	eijema
rub	afukp	os	os	ousousa
sand	mewis	mebsta	mebsta	dibo
say	at͡ʃot	agot	oxot	en
scratch	ax	eragrina	axax	ehigeis
sea	mej	mei mod͡ʒum	mi mod͡ʒum	dum mohu
see	ek	ek	ek	eija
seed	afed	efed͡ʒ	efed͡ʒ	meiɟ
sew	asir	eb	ob	ogon
sharp	afaj	efei etka	efietka	mog
short	ad͡ʒum	estir	esta mug	agarougb
sing	merej d͡ʒog	of	of	ohu mer
sit	aker	eker	eker	eigtou
skin	afot͡ʃ	ofos	owos	mos
sky	mowag	mebaga	mebaga	bogo
sleep	ax	ax d͡ʒax	ax d͡ʒig	atou
small	aŋgej	oskijai	oskaitok	mogurei
smell	ams	eg	emsa	ouma
smoke	ow	efa mosoku	ef misomok	moro
smooth	asuswak	efeta	egirna	eskraha
snake	meŋgos	magosu	mogos	hinogo
some	afirx	eneja	enia	aibibra
spit	at͡ʃirf	os	osrof	ococ
split	ak	ebriji	ebri	aga
squeeze	awid	ebid	ebda	esugb
stab	ed	oduis	odut͡ʃ	edesugb
stand	ot	ot	ot	esa
star	metur	motur	motur	tebeic
stick	met͡ʃkur	moskur	moskur	iɟouhuga
stone	meŋgom	mamu	mogom	igdahabi
straight	awux	axaruka	oxurka	obosboro
suck	of	efa	efa	outut
sun	mow	mowa	mau	igda lona
swell	askid	efifid͡ʒ	esed͡ʒga	ensa
swim	ar mej	era mei	ax mi	ougb duhu
tail	ariek	oiraga	oirega	mesera
that	na	koma	nomi	iŋga
there	joj	suma	ida	suŋga
they	dej	rua	eri	len
thick	awum	efek	ewek	ouŋmerema
thin	aniniwes	axanuka	axabnuk	ekinei
think	astox	osud͡ʒoxu	orusoxt	oudesa
this	kef	kef	nokef	gini
thou	bow	bua	bua	bani
three	arfum	orgomu	orgoum	homoi
throw	ed	eid͡ʒ	eid͡ʒ	edi
tie	axas	akid	axat͡ʃ	ohut
tongue	end	arni	ornoud͡ʒ	metemougb
tooth	afon	ofon	ofon	
tree	mer	mega	merga	sogo
turn	akut͡ʃ	oksef	oksef	eineg
two	arfik	egeka	ergak	hwai
vomit	osis	axa meisoxu	axa mou	ersa
walk	aj	et͡ʃira	et͡ʃira	esebesa
warm	afmem	ofoufem	ofufom	esrougb
wash	axus	ot	ot	eduh
water	mej	mei	mi	duhu
we	memef	mimif	mif	emen
wet	ataf	etefa	etefa	mohumohu
what	mender	meidu	mida	ara
when	mod͡ʒuax	mona egaxo	et͡ʃxa	aiseba
where	gikaf	sinefa	xadefa	digiro
white	ews	ebsi	efsa	ogoufu
who	awer	idu	ida	gara
wide	atew	efefi	otox	ebehibera
wife	maxan	moxona	moxena	mesowa
wind	mofen	mof	mof	lougmen
wing	afambr	efembra	efembra	mebera
wipe	aroj	osuna	osun	ogun
with	tekun	d͡ʒera	d͡ʒera	dara
woman	afad͡ʒ	od͡ʒona	ed͡ʒena	gihida
woods	jet͡ʃ	merembrax	merembax	sogo meba
worm	mefew	mofunfou	marewet	haga

== See also ==
- Hatam–Mansim languages
- West Papuan languages
