= Iraiweri =

- Location in West Papua and Indonesia Iraiweri (Indonesia)
- Coordinates: 1°23′28.4″S 133°49′53.9″E
- Country: Indonesia
- Province: West Papua
- Regency: Pegunungan Arfak Regency
- District: Anggi District
- Elevation: 7,375 ft (2,248 m)

Population (2010)
  - Total: 205
- Time zone: UTC+9 (Indonesia Eastern Standard Time)

Iraiweri is a village in Anggi district, Pegunungan Arfak Regency in West Papua province, Indonesia. Its population is 205.

== Climate ==
Iraiweri has a subtropical highland climate (Cfb) with heavy rainfall year-round.

Climate data for Iraiweri
Month	Jan	Feb	Mar	Apr	May	Jun	Jul	Aug	Sep	Oct	Nov	Dec	Year
Mean daily maximum °C (°F)	20.7 (69.3)	20.7 (69.3)	20.2 (68.4)	19.9 (67.8)	19.1 (66.4)	18.2 (64.8)	17.4 (63.3)	17.4 (63.3)	18.5 (65.3)	20.2 (68.4)	20.6 (69.1)	20.8 (69.4)	19.5 (67.1)
Daily mean °C (°F)	16.0 (60.8)	16.2 (61.2)	16.0 (60.8)	15.9 (60.6)	15.5 (59.9)	15.0 (59.0)	14.4 (57.9)	14.3 (57.7)	14.8 (58.6)	15.8 (60.4)	15.9 (60.6)	16.2 (61.2)	15.5 (59.9)
Mean daily minimum °C (°F)	11.4 (52.5)	11.7 (53.1)	11.9 (53.4)	11.9 (53.4)	12.0 (53.6)	11.8 (53.2)	11.5 (52.7)	11.2 (52.2)	11.2 (52.2)	11.4 (52.5)	11.3 (52.3)	11.6 (52.9)	11.6 (52.8)
Average rainfall mm (inches)	278 (10.9)	293 (11.5)	267 (10.5)	292 (11.5)	307 (12.1)	287 (11.3)	269 (10.6)	258 (10.2)	243 (9.6)	229 (9.0)	233 (9.2)	272 (10.7)	3,228 (127.1)
Source: Climate-Data.org
