= Irires language =

Irires
- Region: Ireres District, Tambrauw Regency, West Papua
- Native speakers: ~500 (2026)
- Language family: East Bird's Head: Irires

Language codes
- ISO 639-3: None (mis)
- Glottolog: None

Irires, Írires, or Irrires is a Papuan language belonging to the East Bird's Head family.

The language is spoken by the Irires people in Ireres District, Tambrauw Regency, West Papua, Indonesia. Ireres District has seven villages, which are Meis, Meinad, Miri, Ifiam, Atafrumek, Wafmana, and Aifamas. During the 1950s, the Irires were relocated to these villages from their original homeland in the nearby mountainous areas.
