= Sumuri =

- District
- Location of the district in the Bird's Head Peninsula
- Coordinates: 2°32′28″S 133°15′38″E
- Country: Indonesia
- Province: West Papua
- Regency: Bintuni Bay

Area
  - Total: 1,922.00 km^{2} (742.09 sq mi)

Population (2020)
  - Total: 16,999
  - Density: 8.8444/km^{2} (22.907/sq mi)
- Time zone: UTC+9 (WIT)
- Postal Code: 98136

Sumuri is an administrative district in Bintuni Bay Regency, West Papua, Indonesia.
