= Imbonggun =

- Location in West Papua and Indonesia Imbonggun (Indonesia)
- Coordinates: 1°7′23.9″S 133°42′36.1″E
- Country: Indonesia
- Province: West Papua
- Regency: Pegunungan Arfak Regency
- District: Minyambaouw District
- Elevation: 6,617 ft (2,017 m)

Population (2010)
  - Total: 205
- Time zone: UTC+9 (Indonesia Eastern Standard Time)

Imbonggun is a village in Minyambaouw district, Pegunungan Arfak Regency in West Papua province, Indonesia. Its population is 103.

== Climate ==
Imbonggun has a subtropical highland climate (Cfb) with heavy rainfall year-round.

Climate data for Imbonggun
Month	Jan	Feb	Mar	Apr	May	Jun	Jul	Aug	Sep	Oct	Nov	Dec	Year
Mean daily maximum °C (°F)	21.7 (71.1)	21.7 (71.1)	21.2 (70.2)	20.9 (69.6)	20.3 (68.5)	19.5 (67.1)	18.8 (65.8)	18.7 (65.7)	19.8 (67.6)	21.3 (70.3)	21.7 (71.1)	21.9 (71.4)	20.6 (69.1)
Daily mean °C (°F)	17.1 (62.8)	17.3 (63.1)	17.1 (62.8)	16.9 (62.4)	16.7 (62.1)	16.2 (61.2)	15.8 (60.4)	15.6 (60.1)	16.1 (61.0)	17.0 (62.6)	17.1 (62.8)	17.3 (63.1)	16.7 (62.0)
Mean daily minimum °C (°F)	12.6 (54.7)	12.9 (55.2)	13.1 (55.6)	13.0 (55.4)	13.2 (55.8)	13.0 (55.4)	12.8 (55.0)	12.5 (54.5)	12.4 (54.3)	12.7 (54.9)	12.6 (54.7)	12.8 (55.0)	12.8 (55.0)
Average rainfall mm (inches)	273 (10.7)	283 (11.1)	266 (10.5)	291 (11.5)	302 (11.9)	284 (11.2)	265 (10.4)	254 (10.0)	237 (9.3)	219 (8.6)	222 (8.7)	268 (10.6)	3,164 (124.5)
Source: Climate-Data.org
