= Merdey =

District in West Papua, Indonesia

- District
- Location of the district in the Bird's Head Peninsula
- Coordinates: 1.942098°S 133.625332°E
- Country: Indonesia
- Province: West Papua
- Regency: Bintuni Bay

Area
  - Total: 789.44 km^{2} (304.80 sq mi)

Population (2023)
  - Total: 1,036
  - Density: 1.312/km^{2} (3.399/sq mi)
- Time zone: UTC+9 (WIT)
- Postal Code: 98163

Merdey is an administrative district in Bintuni Bay Regency, West Papua, Indonesia.
