= Hatam–Mansim languages =

West Papuan language branch

Hatam–Mansim
- Hatam–Moi Brai
- Geographic distribution: Eastern Bird's Head, Indonesian Papua
- Linguistic classification: West Papuan?: (extended) East Bird's Head; Hatam–Mansim
- Subdivisions: Hatam; Mansim (Borai)

Language codes
- ISO 639-3: –
- Glottolog: hata1242

Hatam–Mansim is a small language family of Western New Guinea, consisting of two languages:

- Hatam
- Mansim (Borai)

Ross (2005) tentatively classified Hatam as a branch of the West Papuan family, based on similarities in pronouns (he did not consider Mansim), but Glottolog continues to list Hatam–Mansim as an independent family. Following Reesink (2002), Glottolog lists Mansim as a language distinct from Hattam: "comparisons of old wordlists (e.g. von der Gabelentz & Meyer 1882) readily confirm this difference."

== See also ==
- Mantion–Meax languages
