= Kaitaro =

District in West Papua, Indonesia

- District
- Location of Kaitaro in Western New Guinea
- Coordinates: 2°41′38.1″S 133°41′45.4″E
- Country: Indonesia
- Province: West Papua
- Regency: Bintuni Bay
- District seat: Sara

Area
  - Total: 859.29 km^{2} (331.77 sq mi)

Population (2023)
  - Total: 1,274
  - Density: 1.483/km^{2} (3.840/sq mi)
- Time zone: UTC+9 (WIT)
- Postal Code: 98134

Kaitaro is an administrative district in Bintuni Bay Regency, West Papua, Indonesia.

== Governance ==
Administratively, Kaitaro District consists of seven villages, namely:

Population by village in Kaitaro District, Teluk Bintuni Regency (2023)
Regional Code	Name	Population
92.06.15.2001	Sara	287
92.06.15.2002	Warganusa	247
92.06.15.2003	Warga Nusa II	229
92.06.15.2004	Tugerama	223
92.06.15.2005	Suga	288
92.06.15.2006	Furere	—
92.06.15.2007	Kawaf	—
Total		1,274
