= Sarbe =

- Village
- Location of the village in the Bird's Head Peninsula
- Coordinates: 2°32′52.8″S 133°49′40.8″E
- Country: Indonesia
- Province: West Papua
- Regency: Teluk Bintuni
- District: Kuri
- Time zone: UTC+9 (WIT)

Sarbe is a village in Kuri District, Teluk Bintuni Regency, West Papua, Indonesia. The village is located to the southeast of the Bird's Head Peninsula.
