= Anggi =

District in West Papua, Indonesia

- District
- Location in West Papua Province
- Coordinates: 1°19′32.7986″S 133°54′56.6499″E
- Country: Indonesia
- Province: West Papua
- Regency: Arfak Mountains

Area
  - Total: 82.98 km^{2} (32.04 sq mi)

Population (mid 2024)
  - Total: 3,786
  - Density: 45.63/km^{2} (118.2/sq mi)
- Time zone: UTC+9 (WIT)
- Postal Code: 98355

Anggi is an administrative district (distrik) in Arfak Mountains Regency, West Papua, Indonesia.
