= Tehit language =

Bird's Head language spoken in Indonesia

Tehit
- Kaibus
- salo téhit
- Native to: Indonesia
- Region: Papua
- Ethnicity: Tehit
- Native speakers: (10,000 cited 2000); 500 monolinguals (2000)
- Language family: West Papuan?: Bird's Head; West Bird's Head; Tehit

Language codes
- ISO 639-3: kps
- Glottolog: tehi1237
- Location within Western New Guinea Location within Indonesia
- Coordinates: 1.51°S 131.99°E

Tehit is a Papuan language of the Bird's Head Peninsula of New Guinea. Other spellings are Tahit, Tehid, and other names Kaibus, Teminabuan. The dialects are Fkar, Imyan, Mbol Fle, Saifi, Sawiat Salmeit, Sfa Riere, and Tehit Jit.

== Subdivisions ==
=== Subgroups ===
Major Tehit ethnic subgroups:

- Tehit Afsya
- Tehit Mlafle
- Tehit Mlakya
- Tehit Konda
- Tehit Nakna
- Tehit Imian
- Tehit Nasfa
- Tehit Ogit (Yaben)
- Tehit Nerigo
- Tehit Srer
- Tehit Imian Slaya
- Tehit Imian Salmit Klawsa
- Tehit Salmit Klawsa
- Tehit Sawiat
- Tehit Mla Flassi
- Tehit Mla Srit
- Tehit Wakya
- Tehit Gemna
- Tehit Sfa
- Tehit Fkar (Fkour)

Locations of some Tehit subgroups:

- Tehit Mlafle and Tehit Mlakya, in Teminabuan District: Kaibus, Werisar, Keyen, Boldon, Seribau, Srer, and Sria villages.
- Tehit Konda, in Konda District: Konda, Mnaelek, and Mbariat villages.
- Tehit Nakya, in Saifi District: Malaswat, Manggroholo, Sira, Kwowok, Komanggaret, Sayal, Kayabo, Botaen, Sisir, and Knaya villages.
- Tehit Imian, in Seremuk District: Gamaro, Tofot, Haha, Woloin, and Kakas villages.
- Tehit Nasfa, in Sawiyat District: Wenslolo, Wensnahan, Wensi villages.

=== Clans ===
Tehit clans:

- Anggiluli
- Ajamsaru
- Aru
- Anny
- Antoh
- Asmuruf
- Adiolo
- Aflili
- Anny Snahan
- Athabu
- Bauk
- Blesmargi
- Bolhok
- Bosawer
- Blesia
- Bleskadit
- Boltal
- Bless
- Bri
- Dimofle
- Duwit
- Esfat
- Fna
- Flassy
- Flasisao
- Firisa
- Fafottolo
- Fle
- Flesa
- Gemnase
- Gimnafle
- Ginuni
- Gomor
- Homer
- Howay
- Jarfi
- Kasminya
- Kalithin
- Kabelwa
- Kehek
- Kaisala
- Kareth
- Kamesrar
- Kaliele
- Kedemes
- Kwani
- Kelelago
- Kalilago
- Konjol
- Kondologit
- Kondororik
- Krenak
- Kemesfle
- Klesei
- Krimadi
- Kladit
- Kolin
- Kombado
- Klafle
- Karsao Kadit
- Karsauw
- Kami
- Kambu
- Kalkomik
- Kolenggea Flesa
- Kolinggea Totyi
- Kolingge Amak
- Kolin
- Komendi
- Keya
- Kamesok
- Klofat
- Kowani
- Lemauk
- Lohok
- Lokden
- Majefat
- Maga
- Majesfa
- Majebrofat
- Mbol Foyo
- Mere
- Meles
- Melesogo
- Mlik
- Momot
- Mondar
- Mrokendi
- Mtrar Mian Neman
- Ngomor
- Naa
- Onim
- Oniminya
- Ogon
- Refe
- Ririk
- Roni
- Sabri
- Sabrigis
- Salosa
- Sawen
- Sakamak
- Sa Marfat
- Sadalmat
- Saswen
- Saru
- Safkaur
- Salamuk
- Sagaret
- Sables
- Sadrafle
- Sdun
- Srefle
- Serefat
- Sreklefat
- Sremere
- Saranik
- Seramik
- Sesa
- Smori
- Snahan
- Sarefe
- Snanfi
- Sadiwan
- Sagisolo
- Sregia
- Srekadifat
- Sakardifat
- Salambauw
- Slambau Karfat
- Srer
- Simat
- Segeitmena
- Seryo
- Satfle
- Safle
- Singgir
- Smur
- Saman
- Susim
- Sagrim
- Sreifi
- Srekya
- Srekdifat
- Saflafo
- Siger
- Saflesa
- Sre Klefat
- Syasefa
- Seketeles
- Saflembolo
- Selaya
- Saledrar
- Snanbion
- Sigi
- Sekalas
- Saflessa
- Sefle
- Thesia
- Tidiel
- T’ryo
- Trogea
- Tigori
- Tritrigoin Wato
- Wasfle
- Wamban
- Way
- Watak
- Wafatolo
- Wamblessa
- Wodiok
- Woloin
- Wagarefe
- Widik
- Woloble
- Wororik
- Yatam
- Yajan
- Yajar
- Yable
- Yafle
- Yadafat
- Yadanfi
- Yarollo
- Yelmolo

== Phonology ==
=== Consonants ===
| | | Labial | Alveolar | Palatal | Velar | Uvular | Glottal |
|---|---|---|---|---|---|---|---|
| Plosive | plain | p b | t d | | ɡ | q | |
| Plosive | prenasalized | ᵐp ᵐb | ⁿt ⁿd | | ᵑɡ | ᶰq | |
| Fricative | | ɸ | s | | | | h |
| Nasal | | m | n | | | | |
| Tap | | | ɾ | | | | |
| Approximant | | (w) | l | (j) | | | |

- Glide sounds [w, j] mainly occur as a result of vowels /o, i/ in different syllable positions.
- /q/ can be heard as a fricative [ʁ] when in intervocalic positions, and as a velar [k] when in coda position within the onset of /i/.
- /d/ can also be heard as an affricate [dʒ] when preceding /i/ in word segments.
- Sounds /t, q/ are mainly unreleased [t̚, q̚] in when in word-final positions.
- Fricatives /ɸ, s/ can optionally be voiced as [β, z] when within the environment of /i/, among speech.

=== Vowels ===
| | Front | Central | Back |
|---|---|---|---|
| High | i | | |
| Mid | e | (ə) | o |
| Low | | a | |

- A schwa [ə] vowel sound is said to occur only in pretonic positions, which means in syllables preceding the stressed syllable. It is always heard as unstressed, and always in between consonant sounds.
- /i/ can be heard as [ɪ] when preceding a word-final /ɾ/, and as [ɨ] when preceding vowel sounds /a, o/ within the onset of a labial consonant.
- /e/ can be heard as [ɛ] when in closed syllables.
- /o/ may also have an allophone of [u] when in closed syllables within a labial consonantal onset with a back coda consonant.

== Morphology ==
Tehit has four grammatical genders, which are masculine, feminine, plural, and neuter. Examples:

| gender | suffix | examples |
|---|---|---|
| masculine | -w | ndla-w ‘husband’, sna-w ‘moon’, qliik-w ‘snake’ |
| feminine | -m | -ene-m ‘mother’, tali-m ‘sun’, mbol-m ‘house’ |
| plural | -y | sinas-y ‘small mosquito’, sinaq-y ‘gravel’, siray ‘salt’ |
| neuter | zero | n/a |

Gender prefixes in Tehit can not only be used to denote gender, but also size, wholeness, and the stability of appearances. Masculine gender is associated with small size, parts of wholes, and changing appearances, while feminine gender is associated with large size, wholeness, and stable appearances. Examples (from Flassy 1991: 10–12):

| | feminine | masculine |
|---|---|---|
| wet ‘child’ | wet-m child-3F ‘girl’ | wet-w child-3M ‘boy’ |
| e’ren ‘fish’ | e’ren-m fish-3F ‘big fish’ | e’ren-w fish-3M ‘small fish’ |
| mbol ‘house’ | mbol-y house-3PL ‘houses’ | mbol-w house-3M ‘small house’ / ‘houses’ |
| sika ‘cat’ | sika-w cat-3M ‘male cat’ / ‘cats’ | |
