= Tuhiba =

- District
- Location of the district in the Bird's Head Peninsula
- Coordinates: 1.942098°S 133.625332°E
- Country: Indonesia
- Province: West Papua
- Regency: Bintuni Bay

Area
  - Total: 263.00 km^{2} (101.54 sq mi)

Population (2020)
  - Total: 1,221
  - Density: 4.643/km^{2} (12.02/sq mi)
- Time zone: UTC+9 (WIT)
- Postal Code: 98145

Tuhiba is an administrative district in Bintuni Bay Regency, West Papua, Indonesia.
