= Meyah language =

West Papuan language of Indonesia

Meyah
- Meyakh
- Native to: Indonesia
- Region: North Manokwari District, Manokwari Regency, West Papua
- Native speakers: (15,000 cited 2000)
- Language family: West Papuan: East Bird's Head; Mantion–Meyah; Meyah

Language codes
- ISO 639-3: mej
- Glottolog: meya1236
- Location within Western New Guinea Location within Southeast Asia
- Coordinates: 0.767°S 133.881°E

Meyah (Meyakh) is a West Papuan language spoken in North Manokwari District, Manokwari Regency, West Papua, Indonesia. The Meyah language is agglutinative and head-marking and has no grammatical cases. It has subject-verb-object word order, which comes from nearby Austronesian languages.

== Phonology ==
Meax has 5 vowels and 13 consonants.

Vowels
	Front	Central	Back
Close	i		u
Mid	ɛ ⟨e⟩		o
Open		a	

Consonants
		Bilabial	Alveolar	Palatal	Velar	Glottal
Nasal		m	n			
Plosive	voiceless		t	tʃ ⟨c⟩	k	
Plosive	voiced	b	d	dʒ ⟨j⟩	g	
Fricative		ɸ ⟨f⟩	s			h
Trill			ɾ ⟨r⟩			
Glide		(w)		(j)		

=== Pitch-accent ===
Unlike most other Papuan languages of the Bird's Head Peninsula, which are non-tonal, Meyah is a pitch-accent language with two phonemic pitch levels: rising high and falling high. Tone in Meyah is marked only on the stressed syllable within a word.

The related language Sougb is the only other known pitch-accent language in the peninsula, and the only other nearby tonal languages are the linguistic isolates (Mpur and Abun), so it is unclear if Meyan's tone system comes from a common ancestor language shared with Sougb, or via some other path.

Pitch-accent
Rising	Falling
éj 'drink'	èj 'peel'
mós 'fish'	mòs 'toad'

Some two- and three-syllable words also have pitch accent. For example, éfes 'young' contrasts with efés 'fat', and óboha 'skull' contrasts with obóha 'tools' and obohá 'spoiled'.

== Grammar ==
=== Pronouns ===
Pronouns demonstrate three numbers: singular, dual, and plural. The first person dual and plural pronouns also demonstrate clusivity.

Free
		Singular	Dual	Plural
1st	exc.	didif	magif	memef
1st	inc.	didif	nagif	mimif
2nd		bua	goga	iwa
3rd		ofa	goga	rua

Possessive prefixes
		Singular	Dual	Plural
1st	exc.	di-	ma-	me-
1st	inc.	di-	na-	mi-
2nd		bi-	ge-	i-
3rd		ø-	ge-	ri-

These prefixes are used for verbs, body parts and kinship terms.

=== Nouns ===
Nouns in Meyah are divided into two types: alienable and inalienable, the latter of which includes terms for body parts and kinship relations, and are obligatorily marked for possessor. With alienable nouns, there is morphological complexity. The plural marker -ir can only be used with humans, pigs, and dogs. There is no other method of indicating plurality for other alienable nouns. For inanimate nouns, a plurality may be indicated by certain modifiers such as:

mod ofokou
house many

mod efaga orgomu
house CLF three

==== Kinship ====
Kinship terms, as inalienable nouns, share the same possessor prefixes as body parts and verb stems, however, they differ in the singular possessive prefixes. Instead of the '(C)i-' prefix found on first and second singular prefixes, kinship terms have 'ed-.' (1st singular) and eb- (2nd singular). On verbs and other inalienable nouns, the third person singular possessive prefix is normally unmarked, but kinship terms use the same prefix as the first person plural exclusive, me-. Terms for important kinship relations have divergent morphology, like the lack of a first-person singular possessive prefix for father akeina and mother ameina, which are also used to refer to father and mothers' brothers respectively.

==== Classes ====
There are six classes of nouns, which are differentiated on the basis of their classifier when they are modified by a numeral. The first class is a class used exclusively for humans. Classes two and three relate to food, with the former being for food growing underground and the latter being for food growing on trees and vines. When this food is removed from trees or vines, it is classified according to whether it is 'round,' placed in the fourth class, and 'flat,' found in the fifth class. Class six consists of terms for animals and 'house.'
