= Mansim language =

West Papuan language

Mansim
- mor Moi
- Native to: Papua
- Region: Eastern Bird's Head near Manokwari
- Native speakers: 50? (2010)
- Language family: West Papuan: East Bird's Head; Hatam–Mansim; Mansim

Language codes
- ISO 639-3: None (mis)
- Glottolog: mans1260
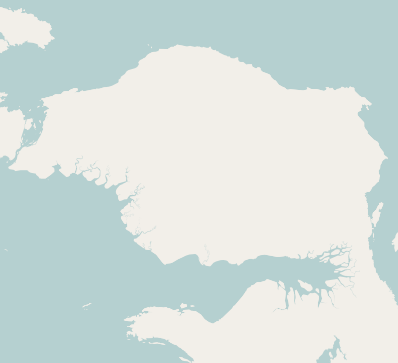
- Coordinates: 0.92°S 134.01°E

Mansim, also known as Borai or Moi Brai, is a West Papuan language of the eastern Bird's Head Peninsula closely related to Hattam. As of 2010 there are rumours of 50 elderly speakers.

== Phonology ==
Mansim has five vowels: /a, e, i, o, u/, and 16 consonants.

Consonants
		Bilabial	Alveolar	Palatal	Velar	Glottal
Nasal		m	n		ŋ	
Stop	voiceless	p	t	(c)	k	
Stop	voiced	b	d	(ɟ)	g	
Fricative			s			(h)
Semivowel				j	w	
Liquid			r~l			

The status of /c, ɟ, h/ is uncertain, due to the single instance in the supporting text.

Like other Papuan languages, Mansim lacks a distinction between /r/ and /l/.

=== Stress ===
Mansim could have a tonal difference between homophones, since the various instances of bar ('something,' 'carry,' 'not') and tan ('inside,' 'far,' 'afraid') could need the use of a different pitch, but this is not seen in the data, although it is restricted. Stress seems to be placed in an iambic pattern over the clause, with stress placed on the second syllable. This means that person prefixes and first syllables of polysyllabilic words, with the exception of full personal pronouns, are unstressed. Citation markers and possessive pronouns can be stressed, but major categories like nouns and verbs do not necessarily attract main stress.

== Grammar ==
The basic word order of Mansim is SOV (subject-object-verb). In the noun phrase, the possessive pronoun is after the nominal position.
