= Sougb language =

Papuan language spoken in Indonesia

Sougb
- Manikion
- Sougb
- Region: Soug Jaya District, Teluk Wondama Regency, West Papua
- Native speakers: (12,000 cited 1987)
- Language family: West Papuan?: East Bird's Head; Mantion–Meax; Sougb

Language codes
- ISO 639-3: mnx
- Glottolog: mani1235
- Coordinates: 1.50°S 133.95°E

Sougb, or Sogh, is a Papuan language of the East Bird's Head language family spoken in the east of the Bird's Head Peninsula to the east of Meyah and to the south of Manokwari, including the area of Soug Jaya District, Teluk Wondama Regency. It consists of four dialects and is spoken by around 12,000 people in all. The language is alternatively known as Mantion, or Manikion, an originally derogatory term used by the Biak people.

== Distribution ==
Locations:

- Pegunungan Arfak Regency
  - Anggi District
- Manokwari Regency
  - Manokwari Barat District (in Ayambori village) and Warmare District
- Manokwari Selatan Regency
  - Dataran Isim District: Tubes and Duhugesa villages
- Manokwari Selatan Regency (Bohon dialect)
  - Tahota District: Seimeba village
- Teluk Bintuni Regency (Raw dialect)
  - Manimeri District: Atibo, Pasamai, and Botai villages
  - Bintuni District: Bintuni village
- Teluk Wondama Regency (Wepu dialect)
  - Sougb Jaya District: Kaprus, Siresi, Yarmatum, Reyob, and Nuspairo villages
  - Rumberpon District: Iseren and Watitindau villages

== Phonology ==
=== Consonants ===
		Labial	Alveolar	Palatal	Velar		Glottal
		Labial	Alveolar	Palatal	plain	lab.	Glottal
Plosive	voiceless	(p)	(t)	c	k		
Plosive	voiced	b	d	ɟ	ɡ	ɡʷ	
Fricative		ɸ	s				h
Nasal		m	n				
Liquid			r ~ l				
Approximant		(w)		(j)			

- Stops /b, d/ are always voiced in word-initial and intervocalic positions, but are heard as voiceless [p, t] when in word-final positions.
- The lateral and trill sounds /l, r/ are only heard interchangeably, freely among speech.
- Glides [j, w] are heard as a result of /i, u/ within vowel sequences (such as /ei, ou, ai, au/).
- /ɡʷ/ is written as gb, and normally heard as [ɡʷ̚]. But it may also be heard as [ɡʷ], [ɡ͡bʷ], or [ɣʷ] when in intervocalic positions.
- /n/ can be heard as a palatal [ɲ] when following /i/, and as a velar [ŋ] when preceding a velar stop.
- /h/ can be heard as [x] when in word-final position.
- /ɡ/ can also be heard as a voiced fricative [ɣ] in intervocalic positions.

=== Vowels ===
	Front	Central	Back
High	i		u
Mid	ɛ		ɔ
Low		a	

- /i/ can be heard as [ɪ] in unstressed syllables.
- /a/ can be heard as [ɐ] in closed syllables.
