= Bintuni Bay Regency =

Regency in West Papua, Indonesia

Bintuni Bay Regency Kabupaten Teluk Bintuni
- Regency
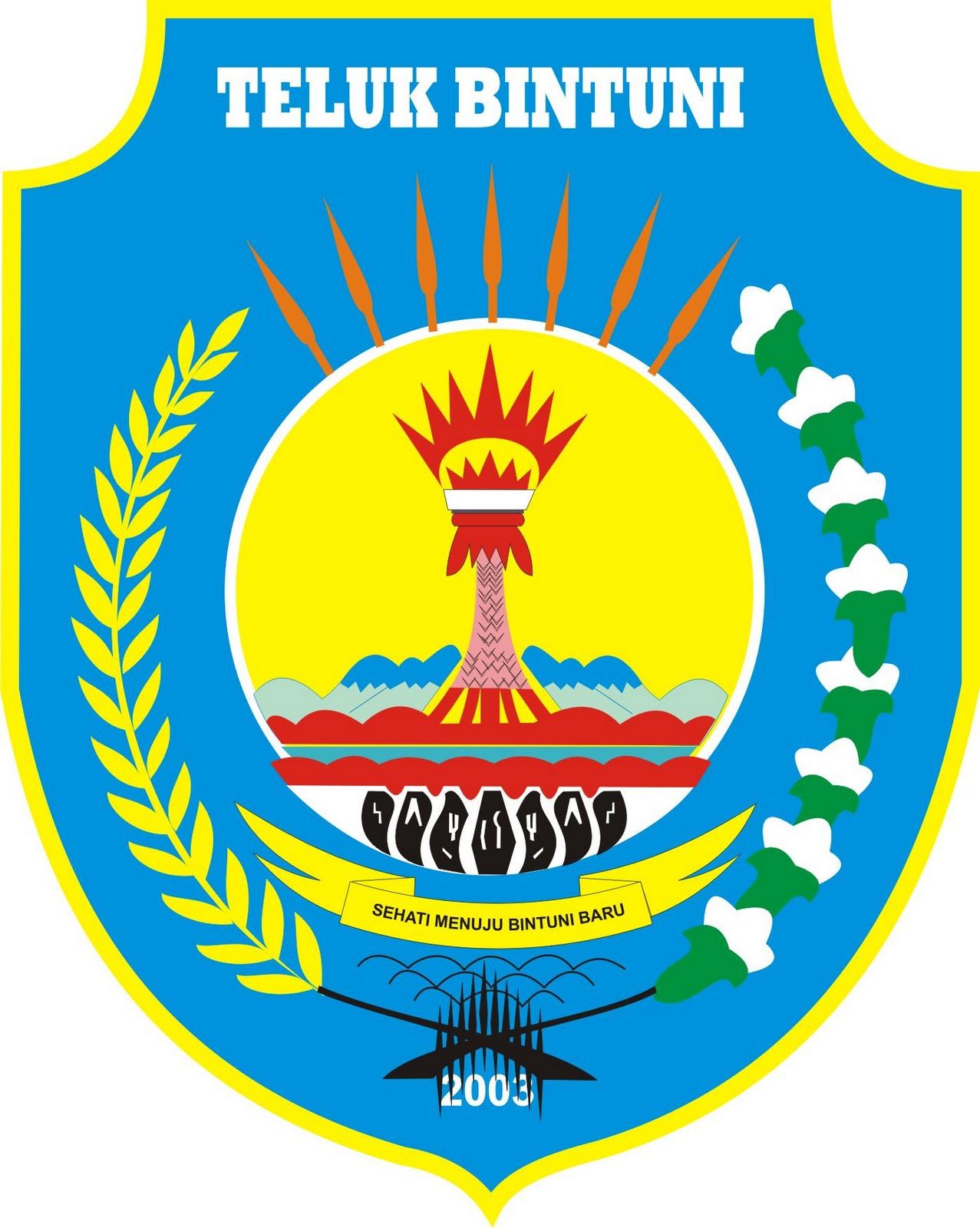
- Coat of arms
- Motto: Sehati Menuju Bintuni Baru (United Heart Towards the New Bintuni)
- Location in West Papua

- Location in Indonesia
- Coordinates: 1.8804°S 133.3311°E
- Country: Indonesia
- Province: West Papua
- Capital: Bintuni

Government
  - Regent: Yohanis Manibuy
  - Vice Regent: Joko Lingara

Area
  - Total: 18,637.00 km^{2} (7,195.79 sq mi)

Population (mid 2024 estimate)
  - Total: 91,064
  - Density: 4.8862/km^{2} (12.655/sq mi)
- Time zone: UTC+9 (Indonesia Eastern Time)
- Area code: (+62) 955
- Website: telukbintunikab.go.id

Teluk Bintuni Regency or Bintuni Bay Regency is a regency of West Papua Province of Indonesia. It covers an area of 18,637 km^{2}, comprising administrative districts on three sides of Bintuni Bay, a gulf that separates the Bird's Head Peninsula and Bomberai Peninsula which together form the main geographical constituents of the province; it had a population of 52,422 at the 2010 Census and 87,083 at the 2020 Census; the official estimate as of mid-2024 was 91,064 (comprising 52,480 males and 38,584 females). The administrative centre is the town of Bintuni.

== Geography ==
The Bintuni Bay area is one of the new expansion districts in the province of West Papua which was ratified by the Plenary Session of the Indonesian House of Representatives on 12 November 2002. Located between the southern coast of the Bird's Head Peninsula and the Onin Peninsula coast, overlooking the Seram Sea off the west coast of West Papua. Adjacent to the narrow neck of the mountain that connects the Bird's Head Peninsula with other regions in West Papua Province. Geographically the area of Bintuni Bay Regency is between 1°57'50"LS - 3°11'26"LS and 1.9.32°44'59" - 134°14'49"E and is located between Bird's Head south coast and Onin Peninsula north coast overlooking the Seram sea off the west coast of Papua. Administratively, the Bintuni Bay Regency is bordered by:

1. To the north, it is bordered by Manokwari Regency (Senopi District and Kebar District) and Arfak Mountains Regency (Testega District and Didohu District);
2. In the west, it is bordered by South Sorong Regency (Kokoda District, North Kokoda District and Kais District) and Maybrat Regency (South Aifat District and East Aifat District);
3. To the south, it is bordered by Kaimana Regency (Teluk Arguni District) and Fakfak Regency (Bomberay District);
4. To the east, it is bordered by Teluk Wondama Regency (Kuri Wamesa District, Windesi District, Nikiwar District and Wamesi District) and South Manokwari Regency (Tahota District and Dataran Isim District).

== Administrative districts ==
The regency comprises twenty-four districts (distrik), tabulated below with their areas and their populations at the 2010 Census and the 2020 Census, together with the official estimates as of mid-2024. The table also includes the locations of the district centres, the number of administrative villages in each district (totaling 115 rural kampung and 2 urban kelurahan), and its post code. The first six districts listed below form the northeast part of the Bomberai Peninsula; Wamesa District is situated to the northeast of Bintuni Bay; and the remaining 17 districts lie in the southeast part of the Bird's Head Peninsula.

Kode Kemendagri	Name of District (distrik)	Area in km^{2}	Pop'n 2010 Census	Pop'n 2020 Census	Pop'n mid 2024 Estimate	Admin centre	No. of villages	Post code
92.06.08	Fafurwar (Irorutu)	1,171.00	1,015	1,357	1,408	Fruata	3	98133
92.06.03	Babo	687.43	3,232	3,873	4,006	Irarutu III	4	98132
92.06.14	Sumuri	1,922.00	6,224	16,999	17,086	Tofoi	5	98136
92.06.16	Aroba	859.29	2,892	2,496	2,582	Aroba	5	98131
92.06.15	Kaitaro	859.29	750	1,143	1,155	Sara	5	98134
92.06.10	Kuri	1,611.00	952	1,170	1,185	Sarbe	5	98135
92.06.07	Wamesa	816.00	1,154	1,514	1,560	Idoor	4	98146
92.06.01	Bintuni	421.75	18,663	32,590	34,721	Bintuni Barat	8 ^{(a)}	98141
92.06.11	Manimeri	316.32	5,208	9,191	9,831	Bumi Saniari	6	98143
92.06.12	Tuhiba	263.00	613	1,221	1,369	Tuhiba	5	98145
92.06.13	Dataran Beimes	316.32	349	684	762	Horna	6	98142
92.06.09	Tembuni	1,326.00	873	1,006	1,025	Tembuni	4	98144
92.06.04	Aranday	572.01	1,055	1,512	1,550	Aranday	4	98151
92.06.20	Kamundan	572.00	660	1,109	1,164	Kalitami	4	98152
92.06.19	Tomu	572.00	2,448	3,350	3,440	Sebyar Rejosari	4	98156
92.06.21	Weriagar	715.00	1,321	1,625	1,697	Weriagar	5	98157
92.06.05	Moskona Selatan (South Moskona)	929.62	509	778	818	Jagiro	5	98155
92.06.23	Meyado	743.69	1,066	1,405	1,450	Meyado	4	98153
92.06.22	Moskona Barat (West Moskona)	743.69	359	454	461	Meyerga	4	98154
92.06.02	Merdey	789.44	481	952	1,065	Merdey	9	98163
92.06.18	Biscoop	789.44	469	712	746	Jahabra	7	98161
92.06.17	Masyeta	451.11	364	524	538	Masyeta	4	98162
92.06.06	Moskona Utara (North Moskona)	679.43	733	648	658	Moyeba	4	98165
92.06.24	Moskona Timur (East Moskona)	509.57	1,032	770	782	Mesna	3	98164
	Totals	18,637.00	52,422	87,083	91,064	Bintuni	117	

Note: (a) includes two kelurahan - East Bintuni (Bintuni Timur, with 16,221 inhabitants in mid 2024) and West Bintuni (Bintuni Barat, with 5,843 inhabitants in mid 2024).

Note also that the figures in the area column appear to contain duplications/errors, but these are the official figures published by BPS.

== Villages ==
- Muturi
