= South Manokwari Regency =

Regency in West Papua, Indonesia

South Manokwari Regency Kabupaten Manokwari Selatan
- Regency
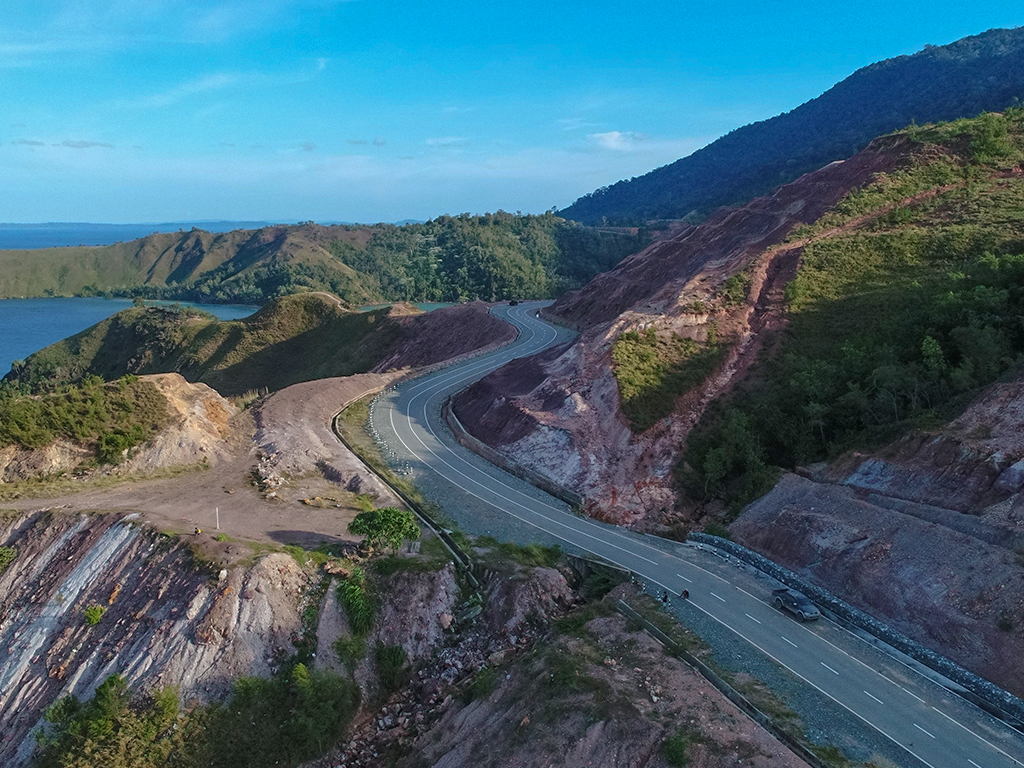
- Trans-Papua road in Gunung Botak

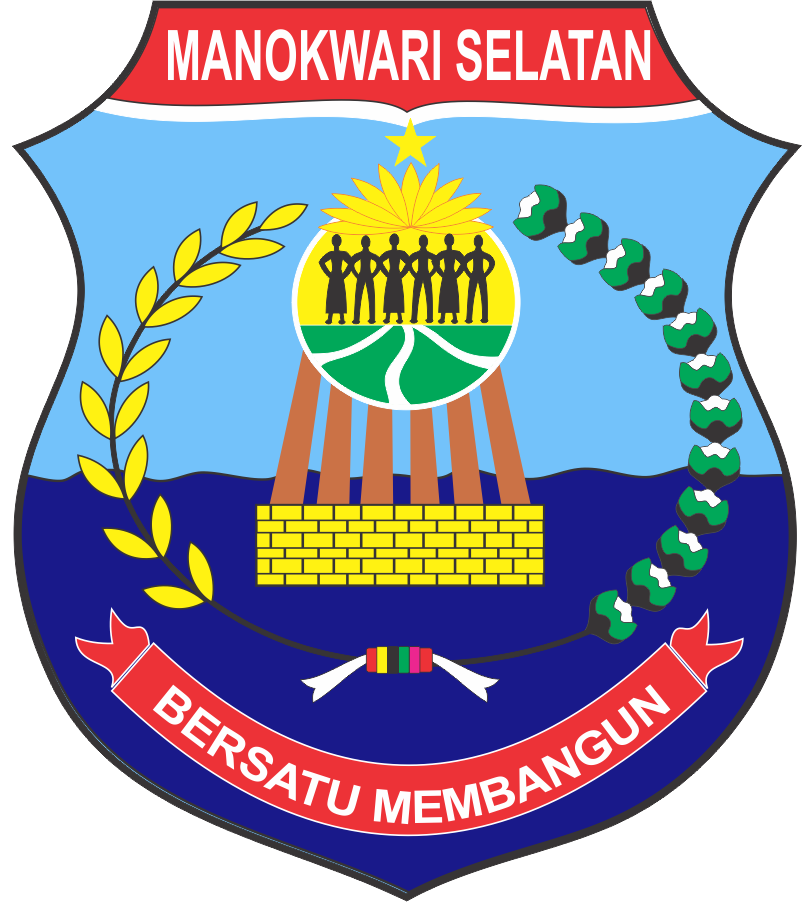
- Coat of arms
- Motto: Bersatu Membangun (Unite to Build)
- Location in West Papua

- Location in Indonesia
- Coordinates: 1.0798°S 133.9673°E
- Country: Indonesia
- Province: West Papua
- Capital: Ransiki

Government
  - Regent: Bernard Mandacan
  - Vice Regent: Mesak Inyomusi

Area
  - Total: 1,837.10 km^{2} (709.31 sq mi)

Population (mid 2024 estimate)
  - Total: 39,026
  - Density: 21.243/km^{2} (55.020/sq mi)
- Time zone: UTC+9 (Indonesia Eastern Time)
- Area code: (+62) 980
- Website: manselkab.go.id

South Manokwari Regency is a regency of West Papua Province of Indonesia. It was formed in 2013 from the southern districts of Manokwari Regency, and covers a land area of 1,837.10 km^{2}. The population of the area now comprised in the new regency was 18,564 at the 2010 Census, which rose to 35,949 at the 2020 Census; the official estimate as of mid-2024 was 39,026 (comprising 19,863 males and 19,163 females). The administrative centre is the town of Ransiki.

== Geography ==
The geographical location of South Manokwari Regency can be seen according to its part as follows:

- North : 1º5' South Latitude;
- Southern Part : 2º5' South Latitude;
- West : 133º45' East Longitude; and
- East: 134º25' East Longitude.

== Administration ==
South Manokwari Regency is divided into six districts (distrik), listed below with their areas and their populations at the 2010 Census and the 2020 Census, together with the official estimates as of mid-2024. The table also includes the location of the district administrative centres, the number of administrative villages (all classed as rural kampung) in each district and its post code.

Kode Kemendagri	Name of District (distrik)	Area in km^{2}	Pop'n Census 2010	Pop'n Census 2020	Pop'n Estimate mid 2024	Admin centre	No. of villages	Post code
92.11.06	Tahota	395.05	581	1,051	1,091	Yermatum	4	98325
92.11.04	Dataran Isim	562.34	2,067	3,365	3,334	Isim	12	98326
92.11.03	Neney	163.16	1,193	2,872	2,790	Neney	7	98323
92.11.05	Momi Waren	298.27	2,030	5,060	5,290	Demini	7	98322
92.11.01	Ransiki	178.61	7,683	16,245	18,303	Ransiki	13	98324
92.11.02	Oransbari	239.67	5,010	7,356	8,218	Waroser	14	98321
	Totals	1,837.10	18,564	35,949	39,026	Ransiki	57	
