= West Papuan languages =

Language family of Indonesia

West Papuan
- (proposed)
- Geographic distribution: Halmahera (North Maluku) and Bird's Head Peninsula (West Papua and Southwest Papua)
- Linguistic classification: One of the world's primary language families
- Subdivisions: Amberbaken (Mpur); North Halmahera; Yawa; ? East Bird's Head; West-Central Bird's Head

Language codes
- Glottolog: None
- Distribution of the West Papuan languages

The West Papuan languages are a proposed language family of about two dozen non-Austronesian languages of the Bird's Head Peninsula (Vogelkop or Doberai Peninsula) of far western New Guinea, the island of Halmahera and its vicinity, spoken by about 220,000 people in all. It is not established if they constitute a proper linguistic family or an areal network of genetically unrelated families.

The best known "West Papuan" language is Ternate (50,000 native speakers) of the island of the same name. Along with neighboring Tidore, they are the languages of the rival Ternate and Tidore sultanates, famous for their role in the spice trade.

== Origins and contact ==
The North Halmahera (NH) languages, spoken in the Maluku Islands, share some structural similarities with certain Papuan families in Melanesia, which was noted as far back as 1900. In addition, there is a number of lexical and morphemic correspondences between NH and West Bird’s Head (WBH). These are not easily explainable as chance resemblance. The question then is whether they are due to language contact (i.e., borrowing) or to common descent (i.e., genealogical inheritance). On the other hand, there is little evidence linking the individual families of the Vogelkop Peninsula to each other, with the relationship perhaps better considered areal (i.e., a Sprachbund). In spite of the shared morpho-syntactic features, many of these languages exhibit little in the way of lexical resemblance.

It is not clear if East Bird’s Head (Mantion–Meyah and Hatam–Mansim), Maybrat, Mpur, and Abun are related to any of the remaining groups. However, a connection between WBH/NH and the Yawa languages appears to be relatively likely. The South Bird’s Head and Timor–Alor–Pantar families, while included in older formulations of the proposal, are no longer thought of as part of West Papuan.

All of these languages show traces of old Austronesian influence. Much of the basic vocabulary in NH (~30%) can be linked with various Austronesian sources, suggesting a long period of contact. The languages of the Bird’s Head have undergone extensive contact with the Cenderawasih Bay languages, such as Biak.

Joseph Greenberg proposed that West Papuan is related to Great Andamanese as members of a larger phylum he called Indo-Pacific, but this is not generally accepted by other linguists. Stephen Wurm states that the lexical similarities between West Papuan, Great Andamanese, and certain languages of Timor "are quite striking and amount to virtual formal identity [...] in a number of instances", and claims that "there seems to be some evidence in support of the possibility that the Andaman languages may have some link, perhaps relational, with languages of one or several of the more archaic Papuan phylic groups [...] though the distance between them is still considerable".

The term "West Papuan" has also been used in an areal sense, encompassing most of the non-Austronesian languages of Halmahera and Bird's Head.

== Languages ==
- West Papuan
  - North Halmahera (Halmahera – West Makian)
    - Core North Halmahera
    - West Makian
  - Amberbaken (Mpur)
  - Yawa (Yapen)
  - West–Central Bird's Head
    - West Bird's Head
    - Abun
    - Maybrat (Central Bird's Head)
  - East Bird's Head
    - Burmeso
    - Hatam–Mansim (Hatam – Moi Brai)
    - Mantion–Meax (Southeast Bird's Head)

== History ==
The German linguist Wilhelm Schmidt first linked the West Bird's Head and North Halmahera languages in 1900. In 1957 H.K.J. Cowan linked them to the non-Austronesian languages of Timor as well. Stephen Wurm believed that although traces of West Papuan languages were to be found in the languages of Timor, as well as those of Aru and Great Andaman, this was due to a substratum and that these languages should be classified as Trans–New Guinea, Austronesian, and Andamanese, respectively. Indeed, most of the languages of East Nusa Tenggara and Maluku appear to have some non-Austronesian influence.

In 2005, Malcolm Ross made a tentative proposal, based on the forms of their pronouns, that the West Papuan languages form one of three branches of an extended West Papuan family that also includes the Yawa languages, and a newly proposed East Bird's Head – Sentani family as a third branch.

Søren Wichmann (2013) considers West Bird's Head, Abun, and Maybrat to form a unified family, but does not accept West Papuan as a coherent language family.

Timothy Usher, also somewhat tentatively, accepts Yawa and East Bird's Head, but not Sentani, as part of West Papuan itself, so the family can remain under that name.

Holton and Klamer (2018) do not unequivocally accept the unity of West Papuan, but note that certain proposals linking "West Papuan" groups together may eventually turn out to be fruitful. Ger Reesink suggests that the West Papuan family should be considered an areal network of unrelated linguistic families, noting the lack of adequate evidence for genetic relatedness.

== Pronouns ==
The pronouns Ross reconstructs for proto-West Papuan are,

I	*da, *di-	exclusive we	*mam, *mi-
I	*da, *di-	inclusive we	*po-
thou	*ni, *na, *a-	you	*nan, *ni-
she	*mV	they	*yo, *ana, *yo-

These are shared by the "core" West Papuan families. Hattam reflects only "I" and "thou", and Amberbaken only "thou", "you", and "she".

Ross's Extended West Papuan languages have forms in *d for "I" and *m for "we". (Most Yawa forms of "we" have m, such as imama, but they are too diverse for an easy reconstruction.) These are found in all branches of the family except for the Amberbaken isolate.

Ross's West Papuan proper is distinguished from Yawa and EBH-Sentani in having forms like na or ni for the second-person singular ("thou") pronoun.

family	I	thou	we
West Papuan	*da, *di-	*na, *ni, *a-	*mam, *mi
EBH-Sentani	*da, *di	*ba~wa, *bi	*meme, *me
Yava	*rei	*wein	(imama etc.)

== Word order ==
Word order is SVO in the West Bird's Head family and in western North Halmahera languages (Ternate, Tidore, West Makian, and Sahu; due to Austronesian influence). SVO word order is also present in the isolates Abun, Mpur, and Maibrat.

The South Bird's Head family generally has SOV word order, although SVO word order is also permitted in transitive clauses. The Timor-Alor-Pantar languages also have verb-final word order.

== Phonology ==
All Papuan languages of East Nusantara have five or more vowels.

Abun and Mpur are fully tonal languages, with Mpur having 4 lexical tones, and Abun having 3 lexical tones. Meyah and Sougb are pitch-accent languages. All other languages of the Bird's Head Peninsula are non-tonal.

Of all the Papuan languages spoken in the Bird's Head Peninsula, Abun has the largest consonant inventory with 20 consonants, while neighboring Maybrat has the smallest with 11 consonants. Large consonant inventories similar to that of Abun are also found in the North Halmahera languages, such as Tobelo, Tidore, and Sahu.

== Lexical comparison ==
The following is a basic vocabulary table of two West Bird's Head languages (WBH) (Moi and Tehit) and three language isolates (Mpur, Abun, Maibrat), quoted by Holton & Klamer (2018) from Miedema & Reesink (2004: 34) and (Reesink 2005: 202); these show diverse non-cognate forms among Papuan languages of the Bird's Head Peninsula:

West Bird's Head family and Bird's Head isolates: basic vocabulary
gloss	Moi (WBH)	Tehit (WBH)	Mpur	Abun	Maibrat
arm/hand	nin	naa	wom	cim	atem
leg/foot	eelik	deit	pet	wis	ao
house	keik	mbol	jan	nu	amah
good	bok	hnjo	mafun	ndo	mof
dog	oofun	mqaan	per	ndar	mtah
pig	baik	qorik	dwaw	nok	fane
chicken	kelem tole	kokok	kokor	dam kukur	kok
louse	-jam	hain	im	im	sruom
water/river	kla	kla	war		aja
banana	o	ogo	fa	weu	apit

Below are lexical lookalikes between North Halmahera languages (NH) (Galela and Pagu) and West Bird's Head languages (WBH) (Moi and Tehit) from Voorhoeve (1988: 194), as quoted by Holton & Klamer (2018):

Lexical comparisons between North Halmahera and West Bird's Head families
gloss	Galela (NH)	Pagu (NH)	Moi (WBH)	Tehit (WBH)
‘head’	sahe	saek	sawa	safakos
‘fruit’, ‘eye’	sopo	sowok	suwo	sfuon
‘egg’	gosi	–	–	esyen
‘man’	ya-nau	naul	ne	nau
‘meat’	lake	lakem	kem	qan
‘tree’	gota	–	–	kot
‘water’	ake	akel	kala	kla
‘drink’	oke	okel	ook	ooqo
‘stab’	saka	sakal	saa	sqaa

== See also ==
- Papuan languages
- West Trans–New Guinea languages
- Districts of West Papua for a list of districts and villages with respective languages
- List of ethnic groups of West Papua
