= Arfak Mountains Regency =

Regency in West Papua, Indonesia

Arfak Mountains Regency Kabupaten Pegunungan Arfak
- Regency
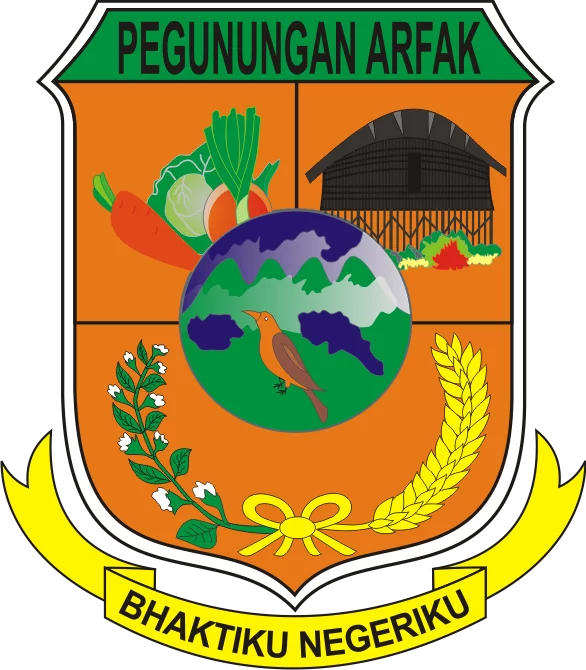
- Coat of arms
- Motto: Bhaktiku Negeriku (My Devotion My Country)
- Location in West Papua

- Location in Indonesia
- Coordinates: 0.9352°S 133.8959°E
- Country: Indonesia
- Province: West Papua
- Capital: Anggi

Government
  - Regent: Dominggus Saiba
  - Vice Regent: Andy Salabai

Area
  - Total: 3,297.58 km^{2} (1,273.20 sq mi)

Population (mid 2024 estimate)
  - Total: 41,383
  - Density: 12.550/km^{2} (32.503/sq mi)
- Time zone: UTC+9 (Indonesia Eastern Time)
- Area code: (+62) 986
- Website: pegafkab.go.id

Arfak Mountains Regency (Kabupaten Pegunungan Arfak) is a regency of the West Papua Province of Indonesia. It was formed in 2013 from what had been the western districts of Manokwari Regency. The areas now comprised in the new regency cover a land area of 3,297.58 km^{2} and had a population of 23,877 at the 2010 Census, which rose to 38,941 at the 2020 Census; the official estimate as of mid-2024 was 41,383 (comprising 20,651 males and 20,732 females). The administrative centre is the town of Anggi.

== Geography ==
Geographical Location of Arfak Mountains Regency, as follows: Part North : 0º55' South Latitude; Southern Part: 1º40' South Latitude; Part West : 133º10' East Longitude; East: 134º05' East Longitude. The altitude of the Arfak Mountains Regency is 300 – 1,800 metres above sea level.

== Administration ==
The Arfak Mountains Regency is divided into ten districts (distrik), listed below with their areas and their populations at the 2010 Census and the 2020 Census, together with the official estimates as of mid-2024. The table also includes the location of the district administrative centres, the number of administrative villages (all classed as rural kampung) in each district, and its post code.

Kode Kemendagri	Name of District (distrik)	Area in km^{2}	Pop'n Census 2010	Pop'n Census 2020	Pop'n Estimate mid 2024	Admin centre	No. of villages	Post code
92.12.05	Didohu	427.54	1,550	2,070	3,452	Iranmeba	14	98359
92.12.04	Sururey	218.22	2,500	2,954	3,251	Sururey	12	98358
92.12.02	Anggi Gida	92.63	1,279	1,969	2,014	Tombrok	8	98356
92.12.03	Membey	129.00	1,055	1,834	1,804	Membey	6	98354
92.12.01	Anggi	82.98	2,006	3,149	3,786	Ullong	13	98355
92.12.06	Taige	69.11	1,290	3,526	3,220	Taige	11	98357
92.12.10	Hingk	229.47	5,353	7,210	7,461	Uncep	29	98353
92.12.09	Menyambouw	230.60	6,181	7,807	8,942	Menyambouw	37	98351
92.12.07	Catubouw	648.38	1,838	4,807	4,183	Catubouw	21	98352
92.12.08	Testega	1,169.65	825	3,615	3,270	Testega	15	98350
	Total	3,297.58	23,877	38,941	41,383	Anggi	166	
