= Districts of Southwest Papua =

The province of Southwest Papua in Indonesia is divided into regencies. The regencies are turn are divided administratively into districts, also known in Indonesian as distrik or kecamatan.

== List ==
The districts of Southwest Papua and their respective regencies are as follows (as of December 2019). Administrative villages (kampung) are also listed for each district.

Regency	District	Languages in district	Administrative villages
Maybrat	Aifat		Ainod, Aisyo, Bori, Bori Timur, Faitmayaf, Faitmayaf Barat (Faitmayat Barat), Faitsawe, Frawebo, Futon, Kocuas, Kocuas Utara, Kocuwer, Kocuwer Selatan, Kokas, Kumurkek, Kumurkek Barat, Martaim, Sampika, Sikof, Sunei, Susumuk, Tehahite (Tahahite), Werjaya
Maybrat	Aifat Selatan		Asiaf Saman (Asiaf Zaman), Awet Main, Fuog, Fuog Selatan, Hora Iek, Imsun, Kaitana, Kisor, Krus, Roma, Sabah, Same Rakator, Sorry, Tahsimara, Tolak, Yeek
Maybrat	Aifat Timur		Aikrer, Aisa, Aitrem, Buoh Sa, Sahbuku, Sanem, Sasior Frabuku, Sawin, Wakom
Maybrat	Aifat Timur Jauh		Aikingging (Akingging), Aimau, Ainesra, Aisasior (Sasior Nafe), Franeway (Framneway), Mesyam, Tiefromen
Maybrat	Aifat Timur Selatan		Makiri, Srumate, Warba, Winuni, Womba, Wormu
Maybrat	Aifat Timur Tengah		Aifam, Aikus, Aiwesa, Assem, Ayata, Faan Kahrio (Faan), Frambu, Kamat, Mupas, Pitor, Saud, Tiam
Maybrat	Aifat Utara		Ayawasi, Ayawasi Selatan, Ayawasi Timur, Fonatu, Haenkanes, Howait, Irata, Konja, Konja Barat, Man, Mosun, Mosun Timur, Mosun Utara, Mowes, Neset, Raha, Susai, Wayane, Yarat, Yarat Timur
Maybrat	Aitinyo		Afkrem, Aitinyo, Bofait, Ibasuf, Irohe (Ihore), Irohmrar, Kamro, Kamro Selatan, Karsu, Korom, Sira Aya, Sowai Sau, Sris, Subin, Sumanis, Tehak Kecil, Wiho
Maybrat	Aitinyo Barat		Fatase, Fatem, Hasweh, Hosyo Ata, Hosyo Banah (Hosiobanah), Kambufatem, Kambufatem Utara, Siyo, Waybomatah
Maybrat	Aitinyo Raya		Faithowes, Ikuf, Ikuf Utara, Isir, Jitmau, Jitmau Timur, Kambusabo, Sarimo, Srirtabam, Yumame
Maybrat	Aitinyo Tengah		Asnaif, Awit, Erokwero, Eway, Framboh, Iroh Sohser, Itigah, Sabun, Sira, Sira Tee, Tohmri, Way 'U' (Way U), Wrait 'U' (Wrait U), Yaksoro
Maybrat	Aitinyo Utara		Asmuruf Tee, Asmuruf U, Bahwat (Bohwat), Fan, Fategomi, Framafir, Gohsames, Inta, Mirafaan (Mirafan), Subrit, Tehak Besar, Tehak Tee
Maybrat	Ayamaru	Maybrat	Afes, Ayamaru, Fraharo, Framu, Mefkajim II, Smusswioh (Smusuwioh), Tuso, Twer
Maybrat	Ayamaru Barat	Maybrat	Chaliat, Fanse, Sehu, Sfacko, Sfaraka (Sfakraka), Sien, Soroan (Sorowan), Tbo
Maybrat	Ayamaru Jaya	Maybrat	Adoh, Orain, Orsu, Rawas, Segior, Soan, Sosian, Temel, Warbo, Woman
Maybrat	Ayamaru Selatan	Maybrat	Hawioh, Kanisabar, Koma Koma, Lemauk Klit, Sagrim, Saneh (Seneh), Sauf, Sembaro, Sfarare, Simiyah
Maybrat	Ayamaru Selatan Jaya	Maybrat	Arus, Asses, Fait Nigre (Fait Nggre), Faitsimar, Isnum, Kofait, Sufu
Maybrat	Ayamaru Tengah	Maybrat	Bawy, Fiane, Hufioh, Isme, Kartapura, Men, Rindu, Semu, Tut, Yohwer
Maybrat	Ayamaru Timur	Maybrat	Faitmajin, Faitsiur, Huberita, Insas, Ismayo (Ismayu), Kambuaya, Keyum, Sefayit
Maybrat	Ayamaru Timur Selatan	Maybrat	Faitwosur / Angkasa Pura (Faitwosur), Isusu, Kambuifa, Kambuskato, Kambuskato Utara, Mano, Sipat
Maybrat	Ayamaru Utara	Maybrat	Arne, Arne Timur, Aus Tiwit, Hohoyor, Johafah, Karetubun, Kfaa, Nauwita, Serma, Setta, Yubiah, Yukase
Maybrat	Ayamaru Utara Timur	Maybrat	Frabo, Karfa, Kona, Kosah, Mapura, Suwiam, Tomase
Maybrat	Mare		Bakrabi, Kombif, Mahos, Nafasi, Rufases, Sawo, Seya, Suswa, Waban (Wabam)
Maybrat	Mare Selatan		Fase, Kuraso, Osom, Renis, Sabes, Seni, Sidi, Sire, Sire Timur
Raja Ampat	Ayau		Abidon, Meosbekwan, Reni, Rutum
Raja Ampat	Batanta Selatan		Amdui, Wailebet, Waiman, Yenanas
Raja Ampat	Batanta Utara		Arefi Selatan, Arefi Timur, Yensawai Barat, Yensawai Timur
Raja Ampat	Kepulauan Ayau		Boiseran, Dorehkar (Doreker / Dorekar), Runi (Reni), Yenkanfan, Yenkawir
Raja Ampat	Kepulauan Sembilan		Pulau Tikus, Satukurano, Wejim Barat, Wejim Timur
Raja Ampat	Kofiau		Awat, Deer, DibalaI (Dibalal), Mikiran, Tolabi (Tolobi)
Raja Ampat	Kota Waisai		Bonwakir, Sapordanco, Waisai, Warmasen
Raja Ampat	Meos Mansar		Arborek, Kabuy (Kabui), Kapisawar, Kurkapa, Sawandarek, Sawinggrai, Yenbekwan (Yembekwan), Yenbuba, Yenwaupnoor (Yenwaupnor)
Raja Ampat	Misool (Misool Utara)		Aduwei, Atkari, Salafen, Solal, Waigama
Raja Ampat	Misool Barat		Biga, Gamta, Kapatcol, Lilinta, Magey
Raja Ampat	Misool Selatan		Dabatan, Fafanlap, Harapan Jaya, Usaha Jaya, Yellu
Raja Ampat	Misool Timur		Audam, Folley, Limalas Barat, Limalas Timur, Tomolol, Usaha Jaya
Raja Ampat	Salawati Barat		Kaliam, Kalwal, Solol, Waibon
Raja Ampat	Salawati Tengah		Kalobo, Sakabu, Waibu, Waijan, Wailabu, Wailen, Waimeci
Raja Ampat	Salawati Utara		Jefman Barat, Jefman Timur, Kapatlap, Samate, Waidim, Wamega
Raja Ampat	Supnin		Duber, Kapadiri, Rauki, Urai
Raja Ampat	Teluk Mayalibit		Kalitoko, Lopintol, Mumes, Warsamdin
Raja Ampat	Tiplol Mayalibit		Arway, Beo, Go, Kabilol, Waifoi, Warimak
Raja Ampat	Waigeo Barat		Bianci, Mutus, Saleo, Selpele, Waisilip
Raja Ampat	Waigeo Barat Kepulauan		Gag, Manyaifun, Meosmanggara, Pam, Saukabu, Saupapir
Raja Ampat	Waigeo Selatan		Friwen, Saonek, Saporkren, Wawiyai, Yenbeser
Raja Ampat	Waigeo Timur		Puper, Urbinasopen, Yenbekaki (Yembekaki), Yensener (Yesner)
Raja Ampat	Waigeo Utara		Andey, Asukweri, Bonsayor, Darumbab, Kabare, Kalisade
Raja Ampat	Warwarbomi		Boni, Mnier, Warkori, Warmanai
Sorong	Aimas		Aimas, Aimo, Klabinain, Klafma, Klaigit, Maibo, Malagusa, Malasaum, Malasom, Malawele, Malawili, Mariat Gunung, Mariat Pantai, Warmon
Sorong	Bagun		Bagun, Bratmawe, Disfra, Klakwonrit, Klamomis, Klawom, Klawon, Mlamli, Mode
Sorong	Beraur		Armoin, Kaas, Klabra, Klamak, Klarion, Kmafo, Midlal, Mumpi, Serselion, Serselion Baru, Sorain, Wanurian, Wensi
Sorong	Botain		Klafluk, Klayastani, Mamsit, Sabake
Sorong	Buk		Buk, Klahen, Klais, Mimpe, Mlakhan, Moos, Tiklen
Sorong	Hobard		Brianlo, Dais, Floyi, Hobard, Klazelth, Selol, Sfadon
Sorong	Klabot		Indiwi, Kanolo, Klabot, Mlasfa, Mlat, Mlawes, Somir, Warkti
Sorong	Klamono		Gisim Darat, Klamano, Klamono (Klalomon), Klasafet, Klawana, Mlais, Mlasmily, Posa, Wariayau, Wonosari
Sorong	Klasafet		Bar Ros, Klamono Oil, Klawili Be, Maladuk, Pusu Tiligum
Sorong	Klaso		Klalik, Klamugun, Klasou, Malawhili, Miskum, Sbaga, Siwis
Sorong	Klaurung		Giwu, Klablim, Klasaman, Klasuat
Sorong	Klawak		Betwaft, Byaklokfle, Cokif, Klasawon, Kmasen, Mlaron, Mlawen, Samolslo, Sas, Tbotjin (Totjin), Wilty, Yurkaden
Sorong	Klayili		Klasowoh, Klatomok, Klawuluh, Klayili, Kwakeik, Malakobutu, Malalilis, Mlawer
Sorong	Konhir		Klafelem, Klaflum, Klafyo, Klamne, Klarin, Mlasiwor, Tarsa, Wisbiak
Sorong	Makbon		Asbaken, Bainkete, Batu Lubang, Batu Lubang Pantai, Klagulus, Klasigi, Klasimigik, Kwadas, Makbon, Malagasih, Malaumkarta, Mibi, Sawatuk, Suatolo, Teluk Dore
Sorong	Malabotom		Klagulu, Klamugun, Klasman, Magatarum, Malajapa, Malamoja, Malasigit, Marik May, Tanah Tinggi
Sorong	Maladum Mes		Saoka, Suprau, Tampa Garam, Tanjung Kasuari
Sorong	Malaimsimsa		Klabulu, Klagete, Malaingkedi, Malamso
Sorong	Mariat		Fafi, Jamaimo, Kasih, Klaben, Klamalu, Klamasen, Klaru, Klasan, Klasukuk, Maklalut, Mariyai
Sorong	Maudus		Bosi, Kamuyar, Klagen, Klaka, Klaos, Klatim, Luwelala, Safdesa, Suluh
Sorong	Mayamuk		Arar, Asjidba, Jeflio, Klalin, Klasmelek, Makbalim, Makbusum, Makotyamsa, Malamay, Warmon Kokoda, Wen
Sorong	Moisegen		Klafdalim, Klaforo, Klasarin, Klasof, Klawoton, Masmili, Ninjemur, Sakamerin, Wonosobo
Sorong	Saengkeduk		Klagele, Klamede, Saengkeduk, Sambatie, Selekobo, Suye
Sorong	Salawati		Katinim, Majaran, Majener, Malaus, Matawolot, Rawa Sugi, Walal
Sorong	Salawati Selatan		Dulbatan, Klotlol, Manoket, Masmaspop, Payapop, Sailolof
Sorong	Salawati Tengah		Batbiro, Durian Kari, Manfanim, Maralol, Meyaup, Sailen, Sakapul, Waibin, Waiman, Waliam
Sorong	Sayosa		Klain, Klamintu, Maladofok, Samusa, Sayosa, Yorbes
Sorong	Sayosa Timur		Kladuk, Klakak, Klalwok, Klawana, Klawon, Sailala
Sorong	Seget	Seget	Kasimle, Klayas, Malaban (Malabam), Mobi, Pulau Kasim, Seget, Wasingsan, Wayenkede, Wewenagu
Sorong	Segun	Seget	Gisim, Klajaring, Klasegun, Klasin, Majemau, Malamas, Segun, Waimlabat, Waimon
Sorong	Sorong		Kabanmolo, Klademak, Klatok, Kofkerbu, Maibo, Malaflon, Remu, Remu Utara
Sorong	Sorong Barat		Klawasi, Pal Putih, Puncak Cendrawasih, Rufei
Sorong	Sorong Kepulauan		Dum Barat, Dum Timur, Raam, Soop
Sorong	Sorong Kota		Kampung Baru, Klabala, Klakublik, Klasuur
Sorong	Sorong Manoi		Klaligi, Klasabi, Malabutor, Malawei, Remu Selatan
Sorong	Sorong Timur		Kladufu, Klamana, Klawalu, Klawuyuk
Sorong	Sorong Utara		Malanu, Malasilen, Matalamagi, Sawagumu
Sorong	Sunook		Bolwi, Dasri, Ketawas, Masos, Sulya, Suus, Warbo
Sorong	Wemak		Kamlin, Klalin Mos, Klawren, Kwari, Saluk, Woloin
Sorong Selatan	Fokour		Bemus, Pasir Putih, Wandum, Welek
Sorong Selatan	Inanwatan	Inanwatan	Isogo, Mate, Mogibi, Odeare, Serkos, Sibae, Siri-siri, Solta Baru, Wadoi
Sorong Selatan	Kais	Kais	Benawa I, Kais, Sumano, Tapuri, Yahadian
Sorong Selatan	Kais Darat	Kais	Haemaran, Ikana, Makaroro, Mogatemin, Mukamat, Onimsefa, Siranggo
Sorong Selatan	Kokoda	Kokoda	Arbasina, Birawaku, Daimar, Daubak, Kasuweri, Korewatara, Migori, Migrito, Nayakore, Negeri Besar, Siwatori, Tambani, Tapas, Tarof, Topdan, Totona
Sorong Selatan	Kokoda Utara	Kokoda	Adona, Atori, Benawa II, Bubuko, Kamundan Dua, Kamundan Satu, Karirif, Kayubiro, Udagaga
Sorong Selatan	Konda	Konda	Bariat, Konda, Manelek, Nagna, Wamargege
Sorong Selatan	Matemani		Bedare, Mugim, Nusa, Puragi, Saga, Tawanggire
Sorong Selatan	Moswaren		Bumi Ajo, Hararo, Hasik Jaya, Johsiro (Joshiro), Kamisabe, Moswaren, Tokass
Sorong Selatan	Saifi		Botain, Kayabo, Kenaya, Komanggaret, Kwowok, Manggroholo, Mlaswat, Sayal, Sira, Sisir
Sorong Selatan	Salkma		Alma, Klamit, Kofalit, Mlabolo, Wenslolo
Sorong Selatan	Sawiat		Elles, Sasnek, Sawiat, Sfakyo, Sodrofoyo, Ween, Wendi, Wensough
Sorong Selatan	Seremuk		Haha, Kakas, Kamaro, Klaogin, Sbir, Srer, Tofot, Woloin
Sorong Selatan	Teminabuan		Aibobor, Ani Sesna, Gorolo, Kaibus, Keyen, Kohoin, Magis, Nambro, Seyolo, Siribau, Tapiri, Tegirolo, Wehali, Wermit, Wernas, Wersar
Sorong Selatan	Wayer		Bagraga (Bagaraga), Baldon (Boldon), Sesor, Sungguer, Ungi (unggi), Waigo, Wardik, Wayer
Tambrauw	Abun	Abun	Saubeba, Waibeem, Warmandi, Wau, Weprari, Weyaf, Wowom
Tambrauw	Amberbaken	Mpur	Binasi, Binmaks, Kabibwan, Manggapnut, Saukorem, Serayo, Waramui, Wasarak, Wefani, Wekari
Tambrauw	Amberbaken Barat	Mpur	Bondopi, Manggaew, Sasui, Saurabon, Wasawmontem
Tambrauw	Ases		Ases, Asuon, Frasayoah, Safoetiek
Tambrauw	Bamusbama		Babak, Bamusbama, Bamuswaiman, Bano, Metbesa, Syarwom
Tambrauw	Bikar		Bikar, Bukit, Nombrak, Suyam, Syunai, Werbes, Wertam, Wertim, Werur, Werwaf
Tambrauw	Fef		Banfot, Esyum, Fef, Ibe, Imor, Iwin, Sikor, Syubun, Syunam, Wayo
Tambrauw	Ireres		Aifamas, Atafrumek, Ifiam, Meinad, Meis, Miri
Tambrauw	Kasi		Irumfei, Kasi Baru, Kasi Indah, Kasi Jaya, Meimorufof, Meserikweda, Wacam
Tambrauw	Kebar		Anarum, Apoki, Injai, Jafai, Jambuani, Manaria, Matatun, Pubuan, Wabanek, Wasanggon
Tambrauw	Kebar Selatan		Ajami, Akari, Amnan, Aniti, Aritowi, Arwani, Atiki, Meiwar, Nekori, Umpay
Tambrauw	Kebar Timur		Arampak, Arumi, Inam, Inambuari, Ireji, Jandurauw, Karawi, Kasi Inom, Meycocforga, Nabisai, Sitori, Untorey, Wasabiti
Tambrauw	Kwesefo		Bao, Batdey, Jokbujoker, Kranfotsu, Kwesefo, Syuau, Syumbi
Tambrauw	Kwoor		Barar, Esmambo, Hopmare, kwoor, Orwen, Sunggak
Tambrauw	Manekar		Ajami Waripi, Akmuri, Aneti, Aranari, Atai (Ata), Atunari, Awori, Itafiti, Narai, Waumi
Tambrauw	Mawabuan		Afrawi, Ajokwapi, Asiti, Bisaud, Nisandauw, Wausin, Wufmana
Tambrauw	Miyah	Meyah	Aibogia, Aifair, Ayae, Ayawit, Hobiah, Ruvewes, Siakwa, Yabuow
Tambrauw	Miyah Selatan	Meyah	Ayamane, Hewi, Mawor, Ruf, Sahae, Sisu, Whismer
Tambrauw	Moraid	Moraid	Bonem, Kwade, Malaworsai, Mega, Namuas, Selewok, Warafor, Warmanen, Warmasi
Tambrauw	Mpur	Mpur	Araro, Arupi, Kali An, Mangganek, Wajarek, Warpaperi
Tambrauw	Mubrani		Arekon, Arfu, Atori, Bawey, Bijamfou, Bonpaya, Marbuan, Meriambeker, Warokon, Waru, Wasnembri
Tambrauw	Sausapor		Bondek, Bondonggwan, Emaos, Jokte, Nanggou, Sau Uram, Sausapor, Sungguwan, Syurauw, Uigwem
Tambrauw	Selemkai		Dela, Kaladum, Klabili, Klasei, Megame
Tambrauw	Senopi		Arapi, Ifat Mitu, Povokek Ania, Senopi, Srurem, Sumo, Thomas, Tintum Araw
Tambrauw	Syujak		Banso, Frafane, Iof, Syujak
Tambrauw	Tinggouw		Hohair, Ifatkan (fatkan), Ruriai, Soon, Tinggouw
Tambrauw	Tobouw		Dombron, Donan, Krisnos, Syukwes, Syumbab
Tambrauw	Wilhem Roumbouts		Araf Mafat, Esyuom, Sayam, Tabamsere
Tambrauw	Yembun		Baun, Metbelum, Metnayam, Salem, Sumbekas, Wormon

== See also ==
- List of districts of Papua
- List of ethnic groups of Southwest Papua
