= Abun, Indonesia =

Abun Distrik Abun
- District
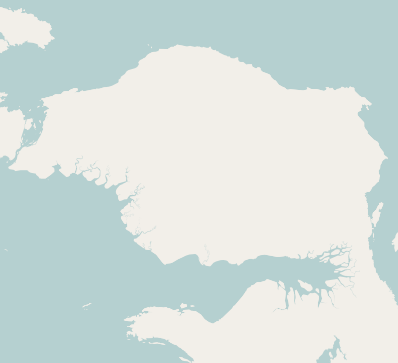
- Location of the town in the Bird's Head Peninsula
- Country: Indonesia
- Province: Southwest Papua
- Regency: Tambrauw Regency

Area
  - Total: 845,914 km^{2} (326,609 sq mi)

Population (2020)
  - Total: 739
  - Density: 0.87/km^{2} (2.3/sq mi)
- Time zone: UTC+9 (IEST)

Abun is a District in Tambrauw Regency in Southwest Papua, Indonesia. Its district capital is Warmandi.

== Administrative divisions ==
Abun is divided into 5 villages which are:

- Warmandi
- Waibem
- Wau
- Weyaf
- Weprari

== Demography ==
=== Population ===
As of the 2010 census, the population of Abun was 603.

Year	Population
2005	561
2010	603
2012	614
2013	612
2014	617
2015	622
2016	621
2017	625
2020	739

* 2010 Population census

* 2011-2017 Proyeksi SP 2010

* 2020 Population census
