= Koor, Indonesia =

Koor Kampung Kwoor
- Village
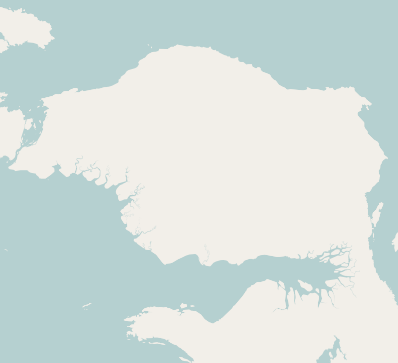
- Location of the village in the Bird's Head Peninsula
- Coordinates: 0°23′S 132°20′E
- Country: Indonesia
- Province: Southwest Papua
- Regency: Tambrauw
- District: Kwoor

Area
  - Total: 18.14 km^{2} (7.00 sq mi)

Population (2020)
  - Total: 333
- Time zone: UTC+9 (WIT)

Kwoor or Koor is a village in Kwoor, Tambrauw Regency of Southwest Papua, Indonesia on the northern coast of the Bird's Head Peninsula. As of 1994 it was reported to have a population of 589 people.

== History ==
In the 1950s, the Koor river basin was explored by the Dutch. The area was affected by a very large earthquake doublet in early 2009, with recorded moment magnitudes of 7.6 and 7.4, that had their epicentre near the town of Waibeem to the east of Koor. The earthquakes prompted a widespread tsunami alert in the Pacific region.

Koor and this stretch of coast of northwest Papua are noted for their seaturtles, possessing one of the largest colonies of the leatherback turtle in the world. A reserve has been proposed, known as the Wewe-Koor Nature Reserve, which would protect this stretch of the coastline. Along with the proposed Jamursba-Medi and Sausapor reserves the three reserves combined would protect 85 km of the coastline.

== Geography ==
Koor is located on the western side of the mouth of the Koor River. The Koor River flows down from the Tosem-Koor Mountains, a rugged massif which has a maximum elevation of around 1700 metres. A sand spit lies at the mouth of the river, to the northeast of the village. Several of the village buildings are located on the sandy beach and others are located further inland under the protection of vegetation. Geologically the village lies on a part of Irian Jaya called the Koor Fault. The villagers speak a language known as the Abun language, common to this coastline.
