= Abun =

Abun may refer to:

- Abuna, a honorific title in the Ethiopian church
- Abun, Indonesia, in West Papua, Indonesia
- Abun people, a Papuan ethnic group
- Abun language, a Papuan language
- Abun, India, a village in Panki block in Jharkhand, India
- ABUN, an Australian television station call sign
