= Ireres =

District in Southwest Papua, Indonesia

- district
- Location within the Indonesian region of Western New Guinea
- Coordinates: 0°51′19.4465″S 132°18′7.7702″E
- Country: Indonesia
- Province: Southwest Papua
- Regency: Tambrauw
- District seat: Miri

Area
  - Total: 431.50 km^{2} (166.60 sq mi)

Population (mid 2023 Estimate)
  - Total: 851
  - Density: 1.97/km^{2} (5.11/sq mi)
- Time zone: UTC+9 (WIT)
- Postal Code: 98367
- Villages: 6

Ireres is a district in Tambrauw Regency, Southwest Papua Province, Indonesia.

== Geography ==
Miyah consists of six villages, namely:

- Aifamas
- Atafrumek
- Ifiam
- Meinad
- Meis
- Miri
