= Mega, Southwest Papua =

Mega Kampung Mega
- Village
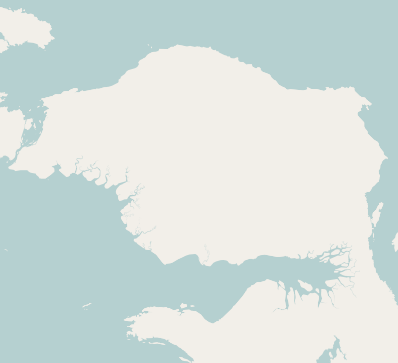
- Location of the town in the Bird's Head Peninsula
- Coordinates: 0°41′S 131°53′E
- Country: Indonesia
- Province: Southwest Papua
- Regency: Tambrauw Regency
- District: Moraid

Population (2020)
  - Total: 246
  - Density: 8.47/km^{2} (21.93/sq mi)
- Time zone: UTC+9 (WIT)

Mega is a village in Moraid, Tambrauw Regency of Southwest Papua, Indonesia. The town is located on the northwestern coast of the Bird's Head Peninsula.
