= Mubrani =

District in Southwest Papua, Indonesia

- District
- Interactive map of Mubrani
- Coordinates: 0°45′43.3548″S 133°25′53.7672″E
- Country: Indonesia
- Province: Southwest Papua
- Regency: Tambrauw
- District seat: Warokon

Area
  - Total: 173.32 km^{2} (66.92 sq mi)

Population (mid 2023 Estimate)
  - Total: 1,496
  - Density: 8.631/km^{2} (22.36/sq mi)
- Time zone: UTC+9 (WIT)
- Postal Code: 98385
- Villages: 11

Mubrani is a district in Tambrauw Regency, Southwest Papua Province, Indonesia.

== Geography ==
Mubrani consists of eleven villages, namely:

- Arekon
- Arfu
- Atori
- Bawey
- Bijamfou
- Bonpaya
- Marbuan
- Meriambeker
- Warokon
- Waru
- Wasnembri
