= Yembun =

District in Southwest Papua, Indonesia

- District
- Interactive map of Yembun
- Coordinates: 0°46′43.2048″S 132°6′55.1016″E
- Country: Indonesia
- Province: Southwest Papua
- Regency: Tambrauw
- District seat: Metnayam

Area
  - Total: 590.63 km^{2} (228.04 sq mi)

Population (mid 2023 Estimate)
  - Total: 1,389
  - Density: 2.352/km^{2} (6.091/sq mi)
- Time zone: UTC+9 (WIT)
- Postal Code: 98379
- Villages: 6

Yembun is a district in Tambrauw Regency, Southwest Papua Province, Indonesia.

== Geography ==
Yembun consists of six villages (kampung), namely:

- Baun
- Metbelum
- Metnayam
- Salem
- Sumbekas
- Wormon
