= Manekar =

District in Southwest Papua, Indonesia

- district
- Interactive map of Manekar
- Coordinates: 1°1′37.3861″S 133°8′39.8058″E
- Country: Indonesia
- Province: Southwest Papua
- Regency: Tambrauw
- District seat: Awori

Area
  - Total: 173.75 km^{2} (67.09 sq mi)

Population (2020)
  - Total: 636
  - Density: 3.66/km^{2} (9.48/sq mi)
- Time zone: UTC+9 (WIT)
- Regional code: 92.09.25
- Villages: 10

Manekar is a district in Tambrauw Regency, Southwest Papua Province, Indonesia.

== Geography ==
Manekar consists of ten villages, namely:

- Ajami Waripi
- Akmuri
- Aneti
- Aranari
- Atai (Ata)
- Atunari
- Awori
- Itafiti
- Narai
- Waumi
