= Warwarbomi =

- District
- Location within the Indonesian region of Western New Guinea
- Coordinates: 0°6′7.2493″S 131°10′28.7047″E
- Country: Indonesia
- Province: Southwest Papua
- Regency: Raja Ampat Regency

Area
  - Total: 297.33 km^{2} (114.80 sq mi)

Population (mid 2024)
  - Total: 1,527
  - Density: 5.136/km^{2} (13.30/sq mi)
- Time zone: UTC+9 (WIT)
- Postal Code: 98467

Warwarbomi is a district in Raja Ampat Regency, Southwest Papua, Indonesia.

== Geography ==
The name "Warwarbomi" is most likely an acronym formed from the names of four villages in the district, namely:

- Warmanai
- Warkori
- Boni
- Mnier
