= Warswai River =

River in Southwest Papua, Indonesia

Coordinates: 0.45889°S 132.13978°E

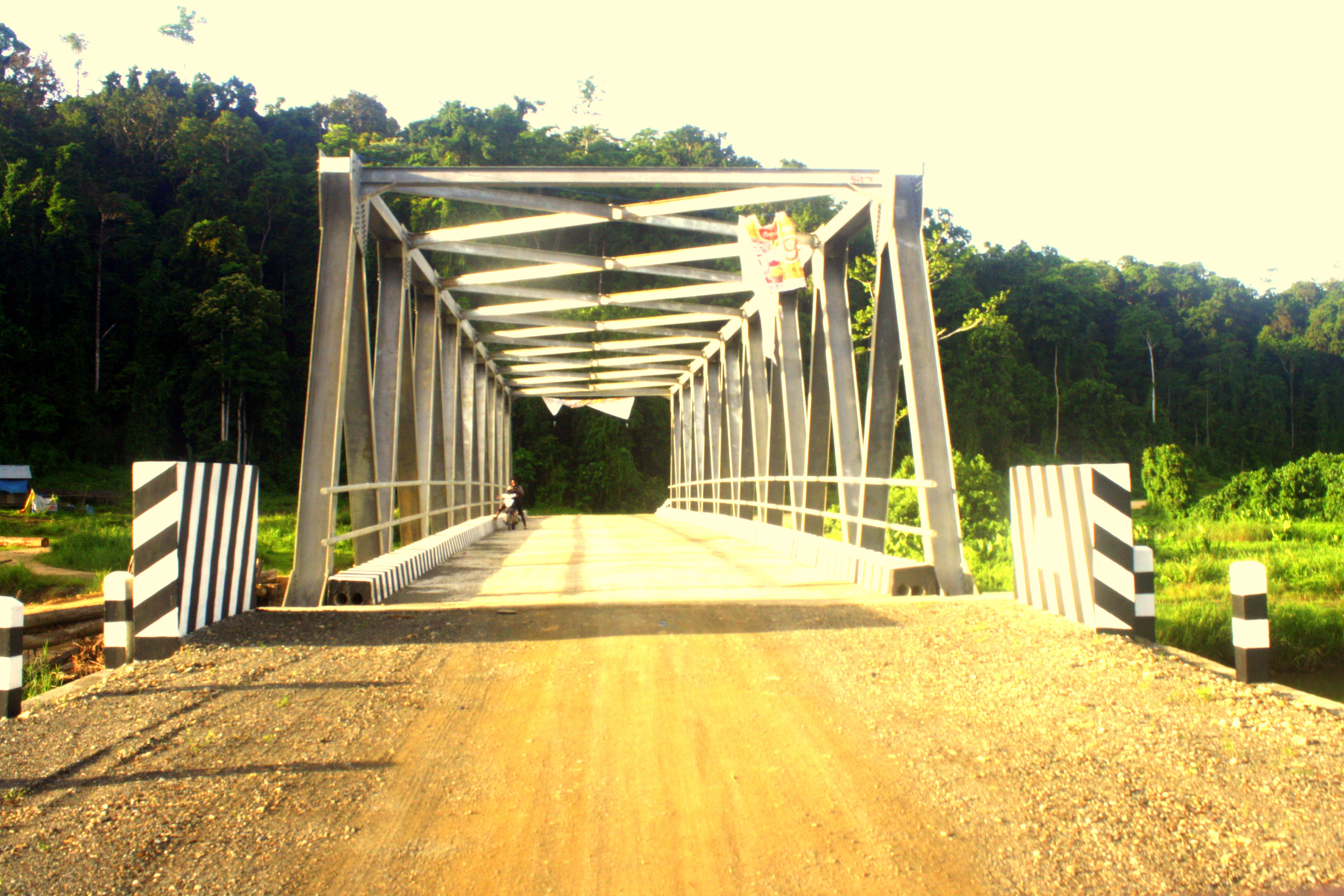
- A bridge on Warswai River at Tambrauw, Southwest Papua

- Location of river mouth

Location
- Country: Indonesia

Physical characteristics
- Source
  - location: Southwest Papua
- Mouth: Pacific Ocean
  - location: Tambrauw Regency
  - elevation: 8 m (26 ft)

Warswai river mouth in Indonesia.

The Warswai is a river in northern Southwest Papua province, Indonesia. It flows in Tambrauw Regency and discharges into the Pacific Ocean.

== See also ==
- List of drainage basins of Indonesia
- List of rivers of Indonesia
- List of rivers of Western New Guinea
