= Bikar, Southwest Papua =

Bikar Distrik Bikar
- District
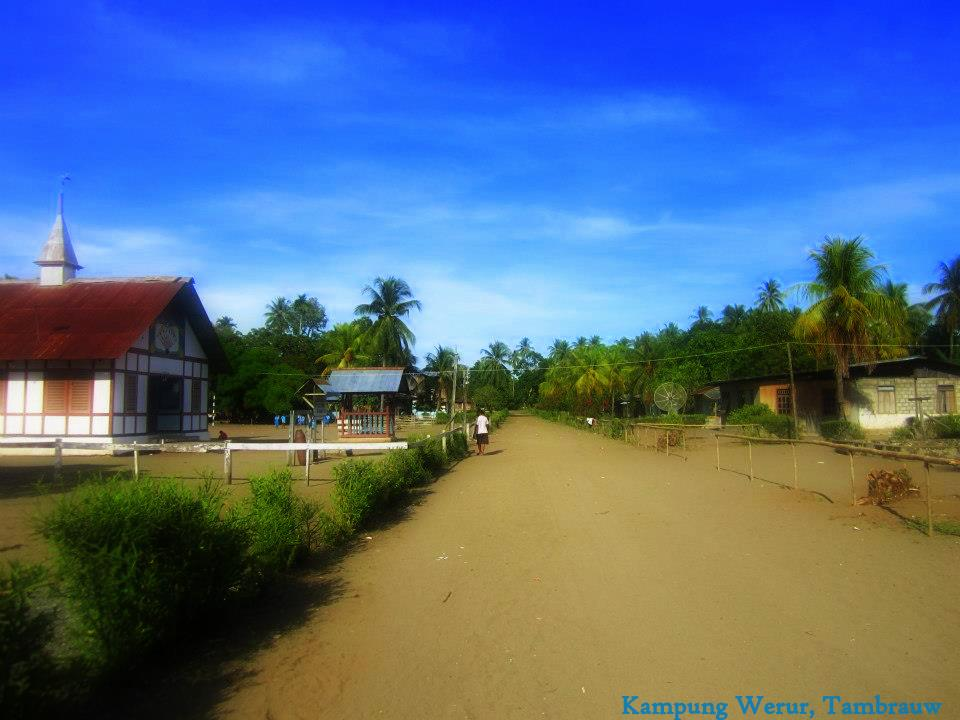
- Werur village

- Location of the town in Southwest Papua
- Coordinates: 0°27′0″S 132°12′02″E
- Country: Indonesia
- Province: Southwest Papua
- Regency: Tambrauw Regency

Area
  - Total: 171.51 km^{2} (66.22 sq mi)

Population (2022)
  - Total: 3,062
  - Density: 15/km^{2} (39/sq mi)
- Time zone: UTC+9 (WIT)
- Postcodes: 98365

Bikar is a small town and district in the Tambrauw Regency of Southwest Papua, Indonesia. The town is located on the northern coast of the Bird's Head Peninsula, also known as the Vogelkop Peninsula. Bikar is the second-least populous district in Tambrauw, with a population of 2.372 at the 2020 Census. Suyam Village is administrative centre.

== Administrative divisions ==
Bikar is divided into 10 villages which are:

- Bikar
- bukit
- Nombrak
- Suyam
- syunai
- Werbes
- Wertam
- Wertim
- Werur
- Werwaf

== Demographics ==
Bikar district covers 171.51 km^{2} (66.22 sq mi) and had an estimated population of 3.062 as of desember 2022

Year	Population
2020	2.372
2021	2.584
2022	3.062

* 2020 Population census

* 2022 Population estimate

== See also ==
- Tambrauw Regency
- Werur Airport
- Amsterdam Island, West Papua
- Middleburg Island
