= Senopi =

District in Southwest Papua, Indonesia

- District
- Interactive map of Senopi
- Coordinates: 1°6′17.0892″S 132°49′32.052″E
- Country: Indonesia
- Province: Southwest Papua
- Regency: Tambrauw
- District seat: Srurem

Area
  - Total: 1,221.73 km^{2} (471.71 sq mi)

Population (mid 2023 Estimate)
  - Total: 1,045
  - Density: 0.8553/km^{2} (2.215/sq mi)
- Time zone: UTC+9 (WIT)
- Postal Code: 98396
- Villages: 8

Senopi is a district in Tambrauw Regency, Southwest Papua Province, Indonesia.

== Geography ==
Senopi consists of eight villages, namely:

- Arapi
- Ifat Mitu
- Povokek Ania
- Senopi
- Srurem
- Sumo
- Thomas
- Tintum Araw
