= Hopmare =

Village in Southwest Papua, Indonesia

Hopmare Kampung Hopmare
- Village
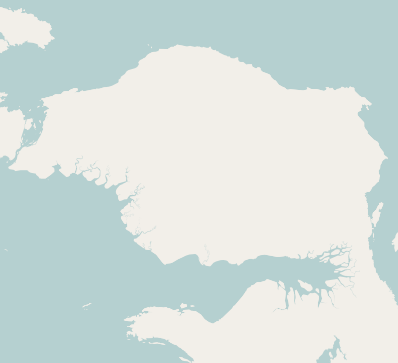
- Location in Bird's Head Peninsula, Western New Guinea and Indonesia Hopmare (Western New Guinea) Hopmare (Indonesia)
- Coordinates: 0°23′25″S 132°15′52″E
- Country: Indonesia
- Province: Southwest Papua
- Regency: Tambrauw Regency
- district: Kwoor

Area
  - Total: 33.69 km^{2} (13.01 sq mi)

Population (2021)
  - Total: 260
  - Density: 7.72/km^{2} (20.0/sq mi)
- Time zone: UTC+9 (WIT)

Hopmare is a village in Kwoor, Tambrauw Regency of Southwest Papua, Indonesia.

== Demography ==
=== Population ===
As of the 2020 census, the population of Hopmare was 260.
