= Werur Airport =

Werur Airport Bandar Udara Werur
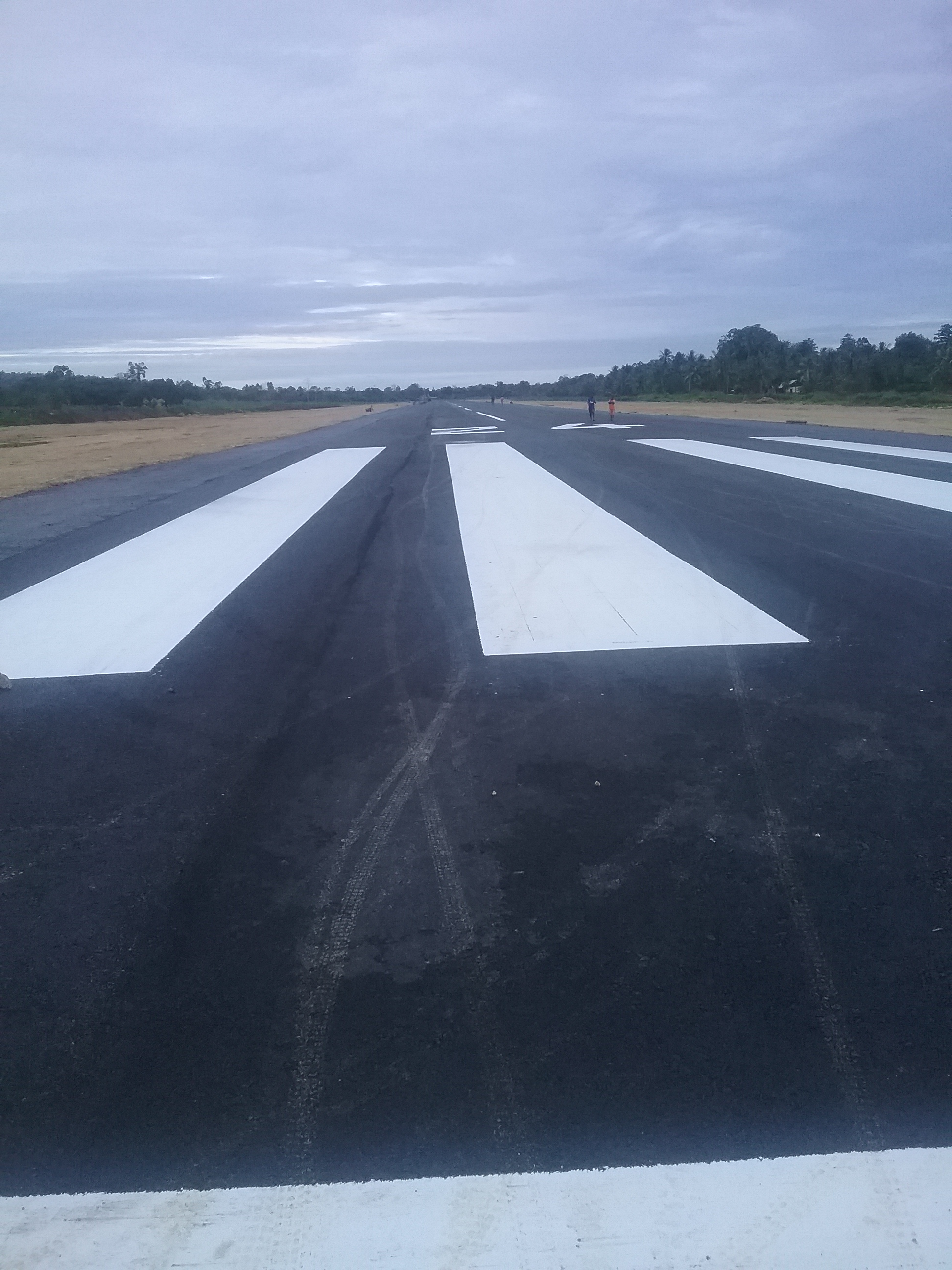
- Runway Werur Airport, Tambrauw
- IATA: WRR; ICAO: WAJY

Summary
- Airport type: Public
- Owner: Government of Indonesia
- Operator: Ministry of Transportation
- Serves: Tambrauw
- Location: Werur, Tambrauw, Southwest Papua, Indonesia
- Elevation AMSL: 38 ft / 11 m
- Coordinates: 00°25′15″S 132°11′13″E

Map
- Location in Southwest Papua Location in Western New Guinea Location in Indonesia

Runways
Direction	Length		Surface
Direction	m	ft	Surface
06/24	1,400	4,593	Asphalt

Werur Airport (also known as Douglas MacArthur Airport) (IATA: WRR, ICAO: WAJY) is located in Tambrauw, Southwest Papua, Indonesia. It replaced the smaller, former World War II airfield, Sansapor Airfield.

== Airlines and destinations ==
=== Passenger ===
As of June 2025, there are no scheduled flights operate in this airport.

== Background ==
In 2014, the Indonesian government said they will provide Rp30 billion, or about US$2.5 million, from the state budget for the construction of the airfield. In the meantime, Gabriel Asem, Bupati of Tambrauw Regency, remarked that the administration has budgeted Rp9 billion, or about US$752 thousand, for the construction of the airport and Rp3 billion, or about US$250 thousand, for acquiring the land for the airport. The airport needs a land area of 200 hectares (490 acres), including for its runway, taxiway, and the apron. The area of the runway is 500 by 23 meters (1,640 ft × 75 ft), while the runway strip is 520 by 60 meters (1,710 ft × 200 ft).

The Werur Airport will facilitate the locals and tourists to reach Raja Ampat and other locations in Southwest Papua.
