= Wilhem Roumbouts =

Wilhem Roumbouts Distrik Wilhem Roumbouts
- District
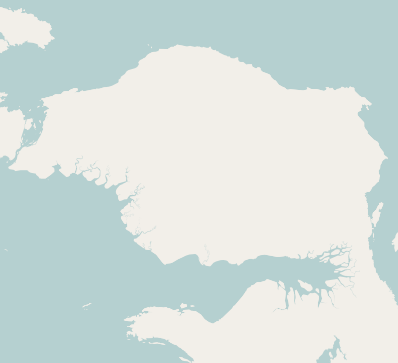
- Location of the town in the Bird's Head Peninsula
- Coordinates: 0°49′03″S 132°36′41″E
- Country: Indonesia
- Province: Southwest Papua
- Regency: Tambrauw Regency

Area
  - Total: 185.01 km^{2} (71.43 sq mi)

Population (mid 2022 estimate)
  - Total: 231
  - Density: 1.25/km^{2} (3.2/sq mi)
- Time zone: UTC+9 (IEST)

Wilhem Roumbouts is a District in Tambrauw Regency in Southwest Papua, Indonesia. Its district capital is Tabamsere.

== Administrative divisions ==
Wilhem Roumbouts is divided into 4 villages which are:

- Tabamsere
- Sayam
- Esyuom
- Araf Mafat

== Demography ==
=== Population ===
As of the 2020 census, the population of Wilhem Roumbouts was 179; the official estimate as at mid 2022 was 231.
