= Werur =

Werur Mar
- Village
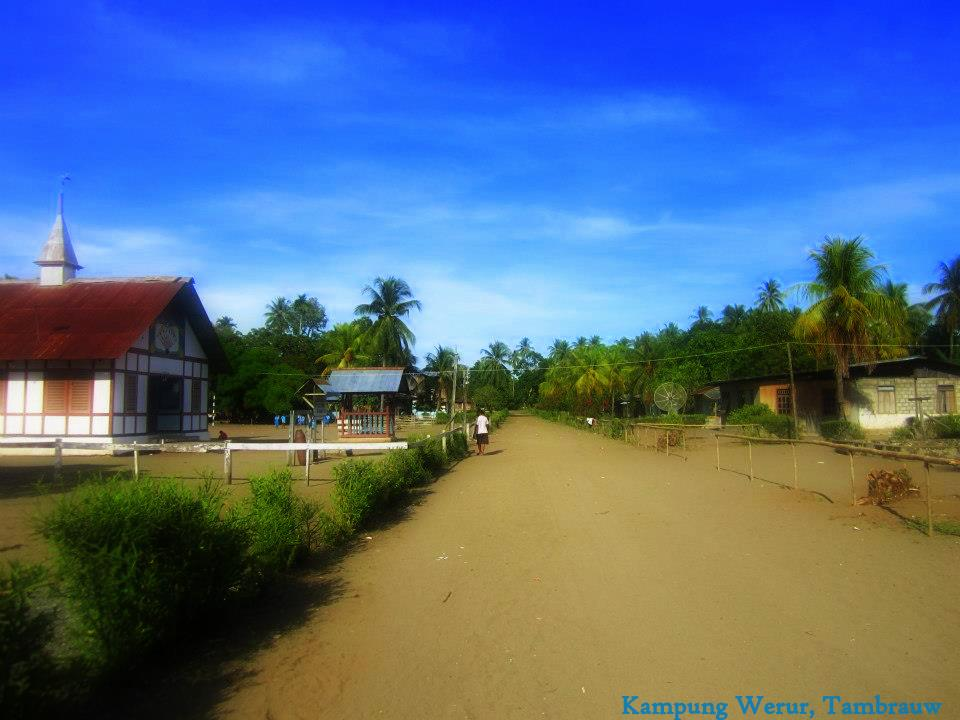
- Werur Village

- Location in Southwest Papua, Western New Guinea and Indonesia Werur (Western New Guinea) Werur (Indonesia)
- Coordinates: 0°24′59″S 132°11′29″E
- Country: Indonesia
- Province: Southwest Papua
- Regency: Tambrauw Regency
- district: Bikar

Area
  - Total: 37.07 km^{2} (14.31 sq mi)
- Elevation: 10 m (33 ft)

Population (2021)
  - Total: 403
  - Density: 10.87/km^{2} (28.2/sq mi)
- Time zone: UTC+9 (Indonesia Eastern Time)

Werur (also known as Mar) is a village in Bikar, Tambrauw Regency of Southwest Papua, Indonesia.and had a population of 313 at the 2010 Census.

The Village is located on the northern coast of the Bird's Head Peninsula, also known as the Vogelkop Peninsula.

== Tourism ==
=== Werur Beach ===
Strolling to the western part of Papua, precisely in Tambrauw Regency, you can meet Werur Beach. Werur Beach, a beach that has preserved its natural composition, and has a quiet atmosphere which can be attractive to some. Indonesia has several tourist destinations, each of which has scenic beaches. Not many people know about its existence, because in terms of location, it is quite far from the city center. The access to this beach is still very limited. But one can still include it as a destination that should not be missed when visiting Southwest Papua.

The type of sand on this beach is fine sand whose color is not so white. While the sea water is clear with the strength of the waves are quite hard.

The advantages of these beaches that have not been visited by many tourists is that their authenticity is still well preserved. There isnt too much garbage or foreign objects around the beach area. Trees grow well around it. This is also a picture of the ecosystem balance in the coastal area which is still well maintained. In addition, there are also several historical spots from World War II that you can find here. Although the access to this place is not yet adequate, you will still be satisfied by the beautiful relics and views that are pleasant.

Even though there are not many tourists, you don't need to worry because there are local people who can help you if you need help. The people are known to be friendly to tourists. You can also ask for recommendations of interesting places around there to complete your vacation activities.

Make sure to bring your own equipment including sitting mats and food when you come to Werur Beach by not forgetting to always keep it clean. As a tourist, supporting environmental sustainability is must always be considered anywhere and anytime.

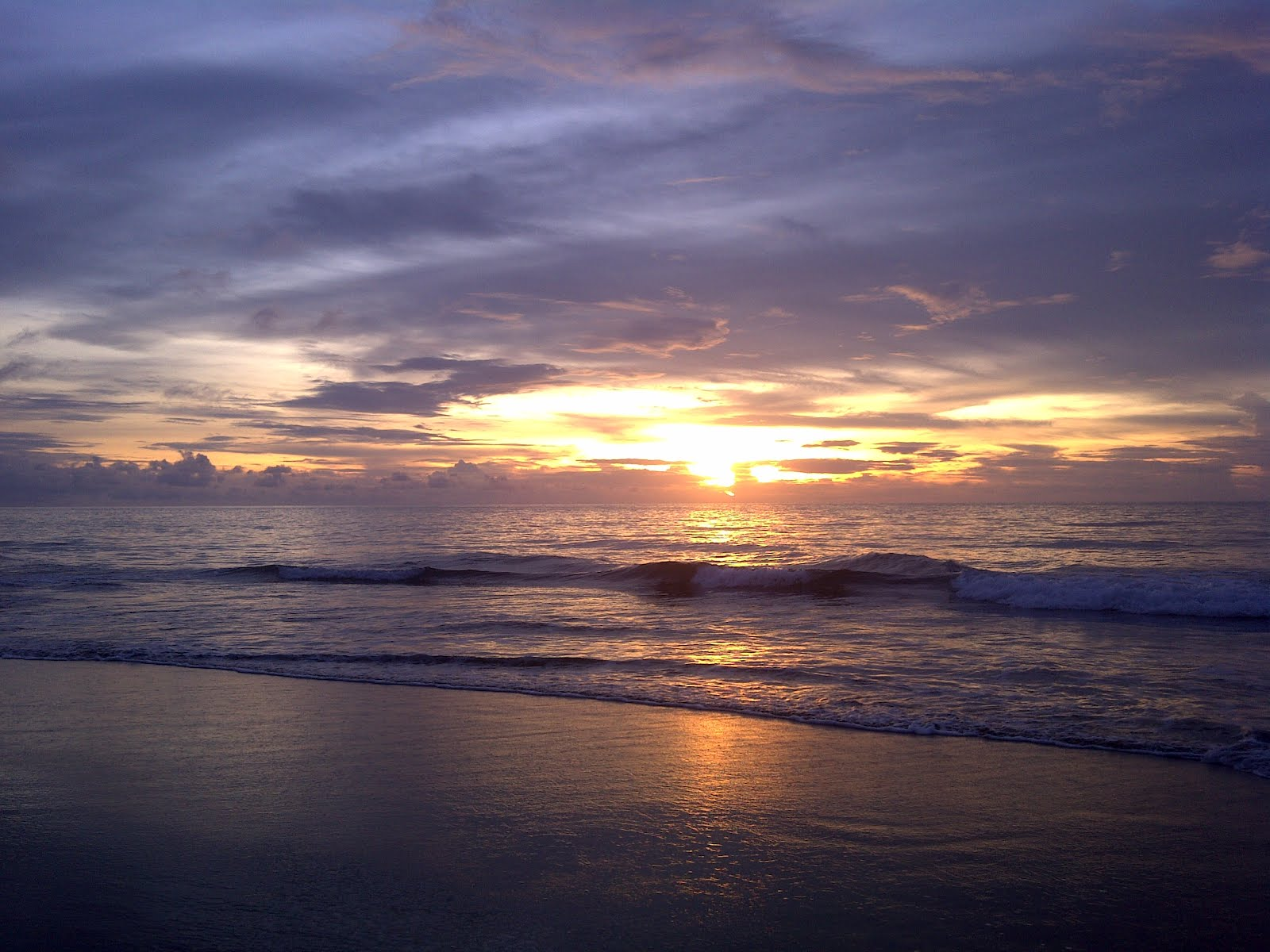
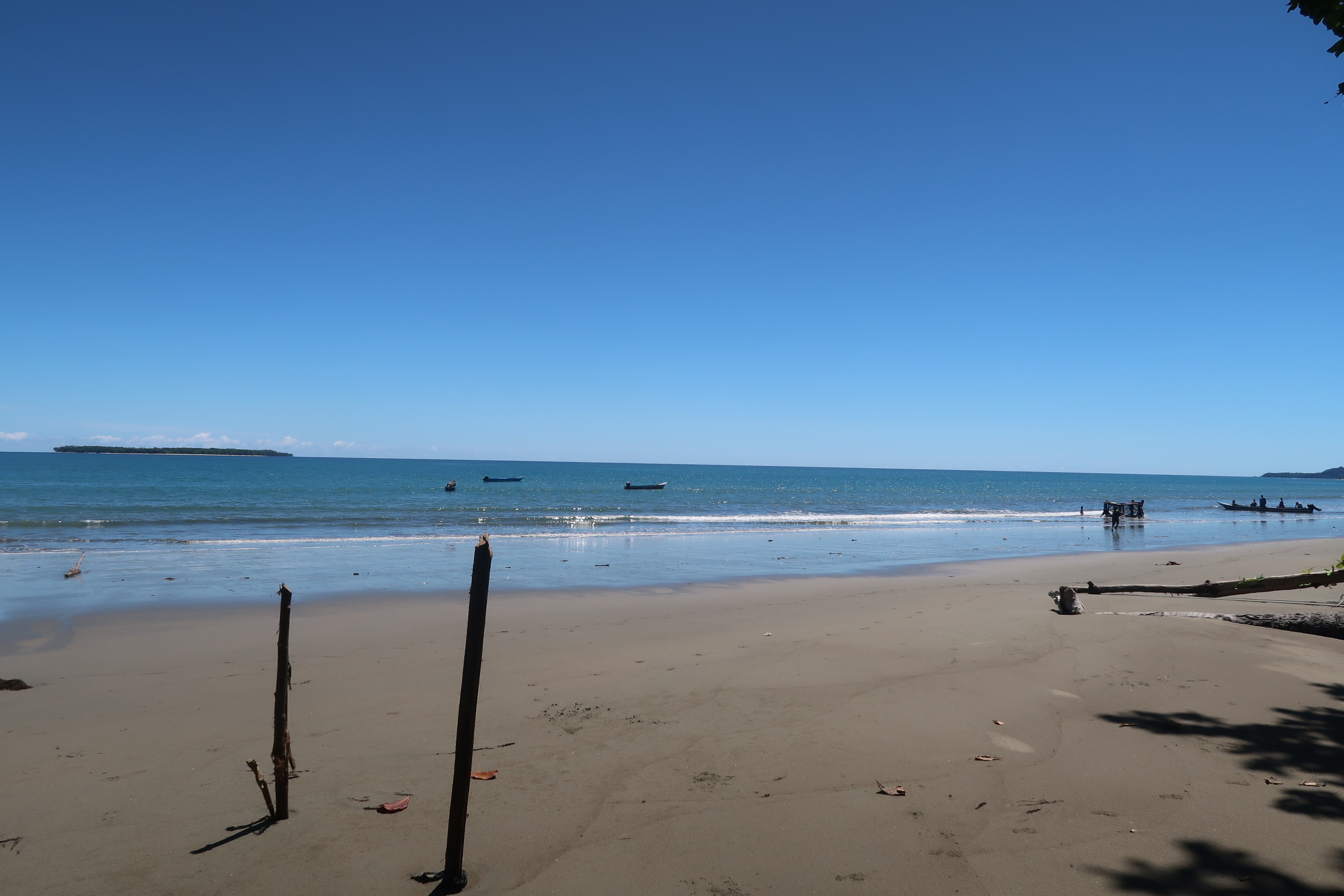
