= Sausapor =

Sausapor Sansapor
- District and Town
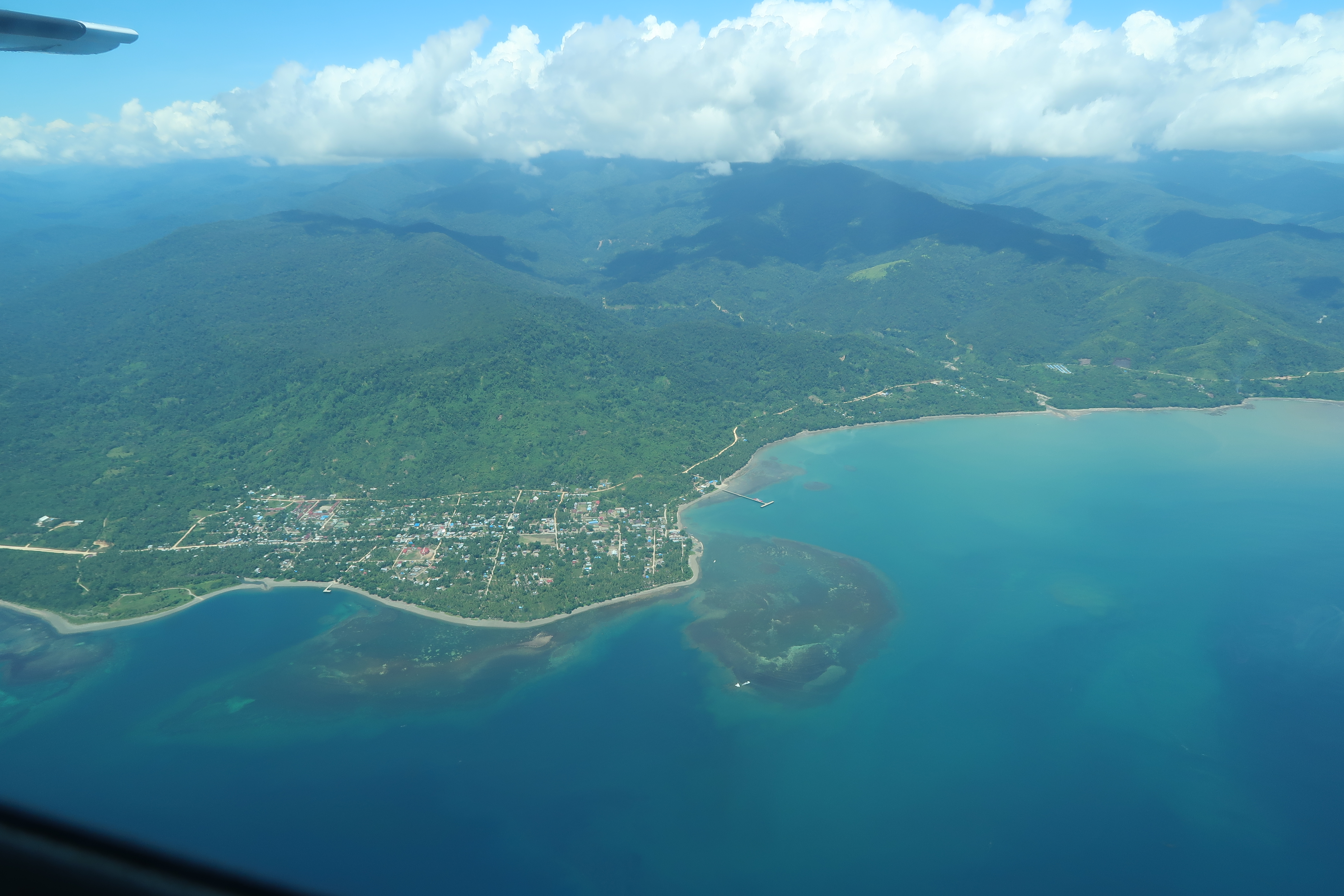

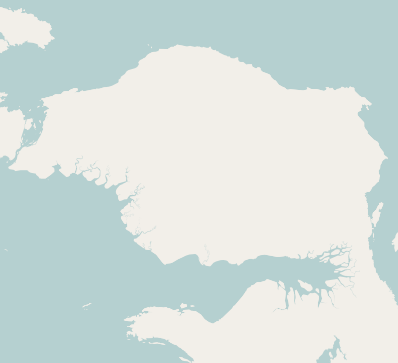
- Location in Bird's Head Peninsula, Western New Guinea and Indonesia Sausapor (Western New Guinea) Sausapor (Indonesia)
- Coordinates: 0°30′11″S 132°04′56″E
- Country: Indonesia
- Province: Southwest Papua
- Regency: Tambrauw Regency

Area
  - Total: 457.47 km^{2} (176.63 sq mi)

Population (2023)
  - Total: 7,226
  - Density: 15.80/km^{2} (40.91/sq mi)
- Time zone: UTC+9 (Indonesia Eastern Time)

Sausapor (alternates: Sansapor or Tandjong Sausapor) is a small town and administrative district (distrik) in the Tambrauw Regency of the province of Southwest Papua, Indonesia. The town is located on the northern coast of the Bird's Head Peninsula, also known as the Vogelkop Peninsula. The district covers an area of 457.47 km^{2} (176.63 sq mi), and, according to the mid 2023 official estimates, had a population of 7,226 (5,044 males and 2,182 females), giving it by far the highest population of any district in this sparely populated regency. The 2020 Census had shown that there were 6,461 inhabitants in the district, of whom 1,063 lived in the main town of Sausapor and 1,293 in Emaos. Sausapor is a major breeding ground for sea turtles and bird habitat.

== History ==
Roman Catholicism spread to Sausapor during the Dutch colonial period when the villagers favoured a Catholic mission effectively governing them rather than a formal Dutch Protestant government. Historically, it has been noted as a cloth producing centre.

=== World War II ===
In preparation for Operation Typhoon (code name for the planned US Army landings on the Vogelkop Peninsula), on June 17, 1944, S-47, under Lieutenant Lloyd V. Young, sailed from the Admiralty Islands for Waigeo, with the mission to insert elements of the Alamo Scouts, Allied Intelligence Bureau agents, terrain experts of the Fifth Air Force, and hydrographic survey men of the VII Amphibious Force. The reconnaissance force landed near Sausapor-Mar on June 23 where the party spent the week surveying the region. As a result of both the ground and aerial reconnaissance the landing facilities was diverted to land 55 miles (89 km) northeast of Sorong.

On June 30, 1944 Operation Typhoon landed at Sansapar (Green Beach), Mar (Red Beach), Middelburg Island and Amsterdam Island. In charge of the Operation Typhoon ground forces was Major General Franklin C. Sibert, commanding general of the 6th Infantry Division. General Sibert was to command an organization designated the TYPHOON Task Force, which comprised the 6th Division (Reinforced), less the 20th Regimental Combat Team. Combat units for the D-Day echelon of the TYPHOON Task Force were the 1st Infantry Regiment, the 1st Battalion, 63d Infantry Regiment, the 1st Field Artillery Battalion, the 6th Cavalry Reconnaissance Troop, a company of the 6th Engineers, and four antiaircraft batteries. All of the landings ultimately proved to be unopposed and it was not until August 16 that elements of the Japanese 35th Division were able to reach the area of the landings. By 31 August the 63d Infantry had killed 155 Japanese and taken 42 prisoners. The American regiment lost only 3 men killed and 4 wounded. The 1st Infantry, on the west flank, killed 197 Japanese and captured 154, while losing only 4 men wounded itself. The 6th Cavalry Reconnaissance Troop, during its series of far flung patrols, killed 42 Japanese and captured 5 others. Total battle casualties for the TYPHOON Task Force from 30 July through 31 August were 14 killed, 35 wounded, and 9 injured. Japanese losses during the same period were estimated to be 385 killed and 215 captured.

Eventually, the runway for fighter aircraft was built on Middleburg Island and for bombers near Mar to the northeast (the landing strip is still visible to this day), although the control of Sausapor was vital for the security of the base to launch the campaign and remained an air warning radar station. Ships patrolled this area of the coastline throughout the month-long campaign, keeping the Japanese at bay. Operation Globetrotter ended on August 31 and General MacArthur's last point of landing on the way back to the Philippines was at Sausapor. Cape Opmarai Airfield is now a nearby, disused airfield.

After American troops landed in Sausapor in 1944, a tsutsugamushi epidemic occurred. Subsequently, research was conducted on Sansapor's rats and mites, using C-rations as rat bait, to better understand the epidemiology of the illness. The First Infantry Regiment suffered nine dead and 121 hospitalized from the disease. Another 258 reported fevers but were not hospitalized.

== Geography ==
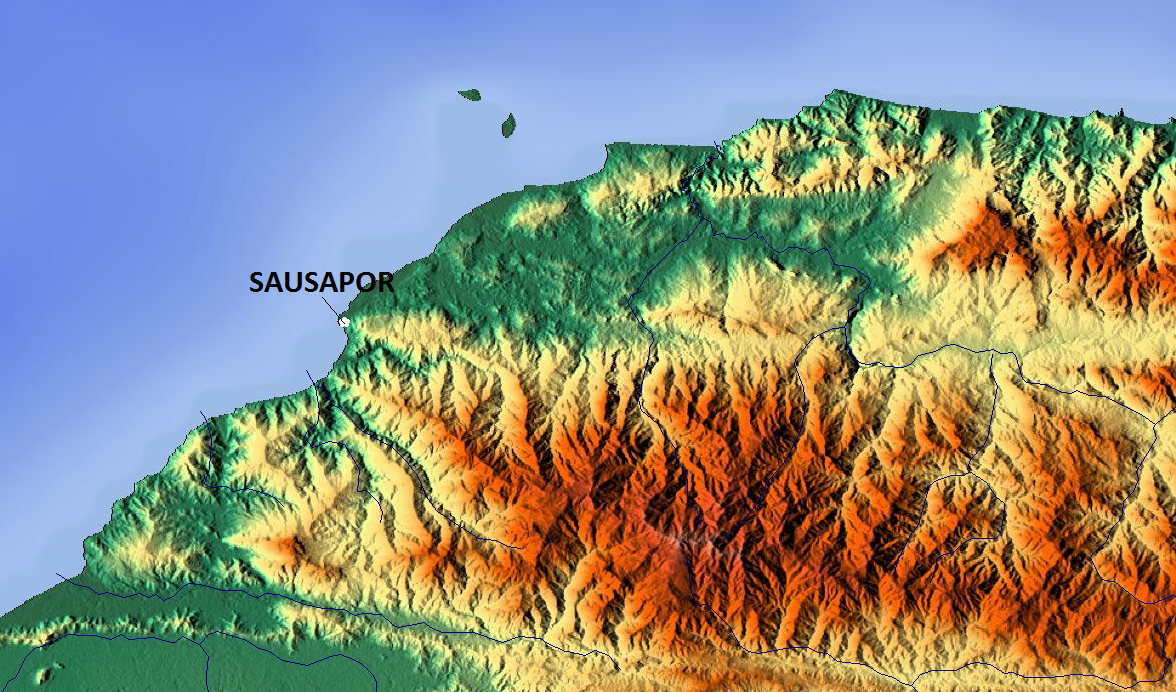
Relief map of the area

Sausapor is located on the northern coast of the Bird's Head Peninsula of northwestern Papua. It is situated 15 miles (24 km) west of Tanjung Yamursba, the northernmost point of New Guinea. The mouth of the Wewe River empties into the sea near Sausapor. While it was known as Dutch New Guinea, Sansapor, just south of the equator, was its most northern area.

Sausapor has several zones which include rain forest, garden areas, beach, and forest margin. Thirteen miles to the northeast of the settlement is Mar and the islands off its coast; Mios Soe Islands, Middleburg Island and Amsterdam Island. The area around the village is heavily forested, with hilly areas to the southeast. The extensive stretch of beach in the area is known as the "Green Beach". Entrance into Sansapor's jetty is through a narrow opening in the coral reef. The sea bottom, 40 feet (12 m) to 50 feet (15 m) below water, is visible from above.

Annual rainfall is approximately 300 inches (7,600 mm) per year.

== Demography ==
=== Population ===
According to the 2020 census, the distrik of Sausapor had a population of 6,461 people, almost double the estimated figure of 3,325 in 1983. The town itself according to more recent figures has a population of 1000 people; 400 people at least in the town speak a language known as the Je dialect of the Abun language. The district contains ten villages (kampung) - Bondek, Bondonggwan, Emaos, Jokte, Nanggou, Sau Uram, Sausapor, Sungguwan, Syurauw and Uigwem.

.

The main religious group are Christians with Muslims forming a major minority. The main ethnic groups are the Karon and Yeden constituted by the sub ethnic groups of Karon Pantai, Karondori, Marei, Madik, Meyah, Haram and Arfak.

== Culture ==
A tribal dance native to this region is known as alin or sera (to the north of Sausapor) which involves the participants forming a circle.

== Fauna and flora ==
Sausapor is an important wildlife spot, in particular it is a sea turtle breeding ground and host to a diversity of bird species. Birds which have been spotted at Sausapor include Gymnocorvus, Manucodia ater ater, Manucodia chalybatus and Craspedophora magnifica magnifica. A pigeon-sized, light blue coloured bird is called bocrocu by the inhabitants.

A variety of bananas grow here, including yellow-skinned, green-skinned, and "red bananas".

Avifauna

According to the Proceedings of the Academy of Natural Sciences of Philadelphia published in 1940, the various birds species collected or sighted near Sausapor are: Acipeter poliocephalus (at sea level), Pandion haliaetus cristatus, Megaphodius freycinet duperyii (along the shore), Gaura cristata cristata (common along the coast and not inland), Psittrichas fulgidus (found in flocks of 5 or 6), Geoffroyus Geoffroyi pucherani, Podargus Papuensis, Podargus ocellatus ocellatus, Caprimulgus macrurus yorki, Collocalia vanikorensis granti, Ceyex lepidus solitarius, Halcyon sancta sancta, Tanysiptera galatea galatea, Meropa ornatus, Eurystomus orientalis pacificus, Hirundo thahitica frontalis, Gerygone chrysogaster notata, Gerygone pelpebrosa pelpebrosa, Rhipidura leucophyra melaleuca, Rhipidura rufiventris gularis, Monarcha cinerascens inornatus, Monarcha chrysomela melanonotus, Arses telescophthalmus telescophthalmus, Machaerirhynchus flaviventer albigula, Poecilodryas hypoleuca hypoleuca, Pachycephala griseiceps griseiceps, Pitohui ferrugineus ferrugineus, Oriolus szalayi, Cracticus cassicus, Gymnocorvus tristis, Manucodia ater ater, Manucodia chalybatus, Craspedophora magifica magnifica, Parotia sefilata, Cicinnurus regius rex, Paradissea minor minor, Cinnyris jugularsis frenata, Toxorhamphus novaguineae novaguineae and Xanthotis chrysotis chrysotis.

== Conservation ==
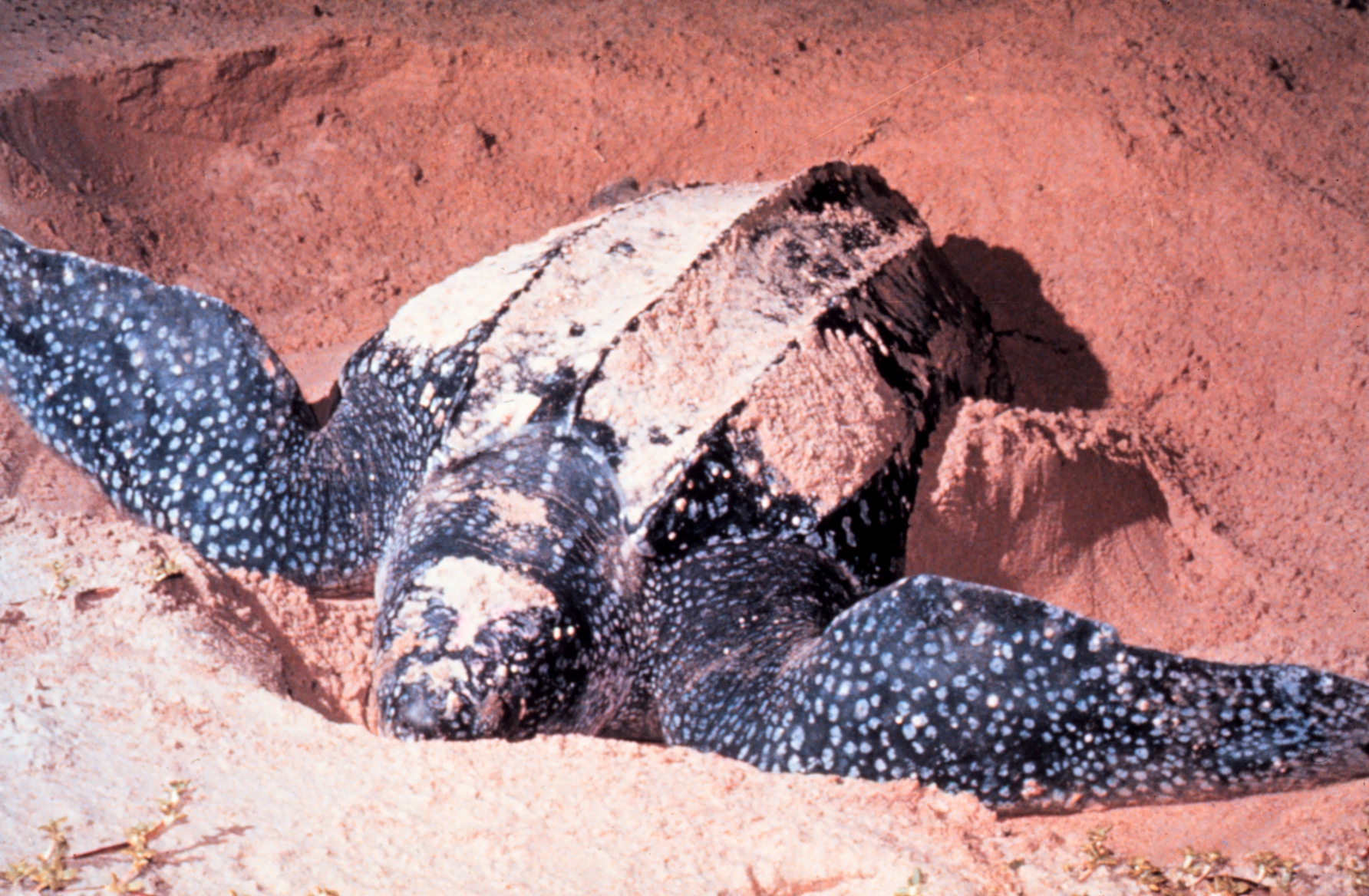
Leatherback sea turtle.

The coastline off Sausapor has been proposed for a reserve named Sausapor Nature Reserve, although a 1989 publication seems to indicate that a reserve named Sausapor Strict Nature Reserve protecting turtle nesting ground has existed in the area for quite some time. This is also corroborated by the action proposed to relocate 50 families living near the turtle nestling beach area of this reserve. Along with the proposed Wewe-Koor and Jamursba-Medi reserves the three reserves combined would protect 85 kilometres (53 mi) of the coastline.

The Sausapor Nature Reserve is part of the proposed Jamursba-Medi, Sausapor and Wewe-Koor Nature Reserves that extends over a length of 85 km of the northern coast of Vogelkop peninsula. It is reported that these sites have the world's largest number of leatherback sea turtle (Dermochelys coriacea) colonies. World Wide Fund for Nature (WWF) in association with the Indonesian officials has been active in this area, since 1993, by patrolling the area to prevent poaching of the turtle and their eggs.
