= Warmandi =

Warmandi Kampung Warmandi
- Village
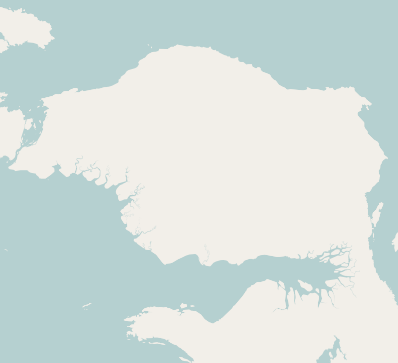
- Location of the village in the Bird's Head Peninsula
- Coordinates: 0°22′S 132°39′E
- Country: Indonesia
- Province: Southwest Papua
- Regency: Tambrauw
- District: Abun
- Time zone: UTC+9 (WIT)

Warmandi is the district capital of Abun in Tambrauw Regency in the Indonesian province of Southwest Papua. The village is located on the northern coast of the Bird's Head Peninsula.
