= Maybrat Regency =

Regency in Southwest Papua, Indonesia

Maybrat Regency Kabupaten Maybrat
- Regency
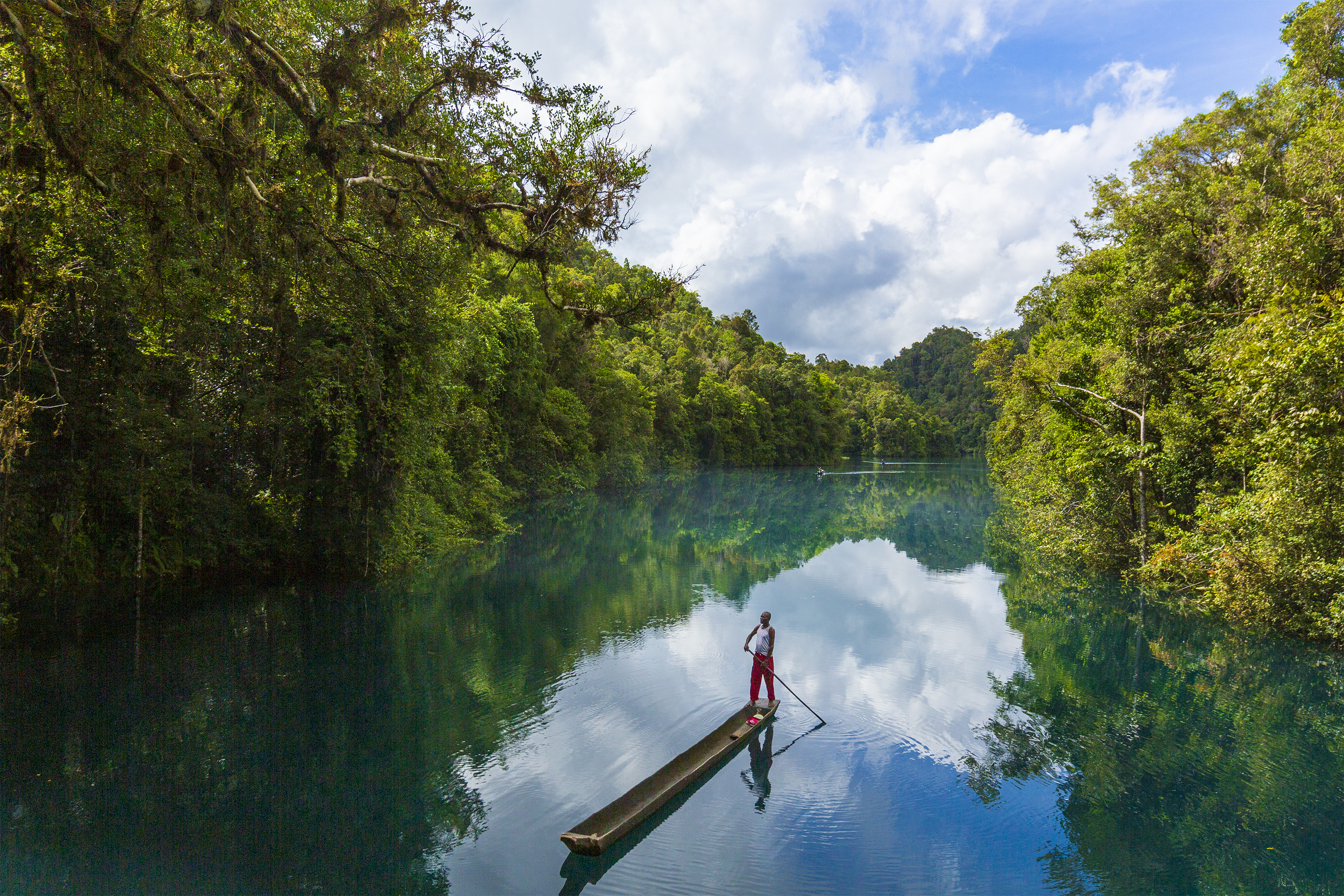
- Lake Uter in Aitinyo

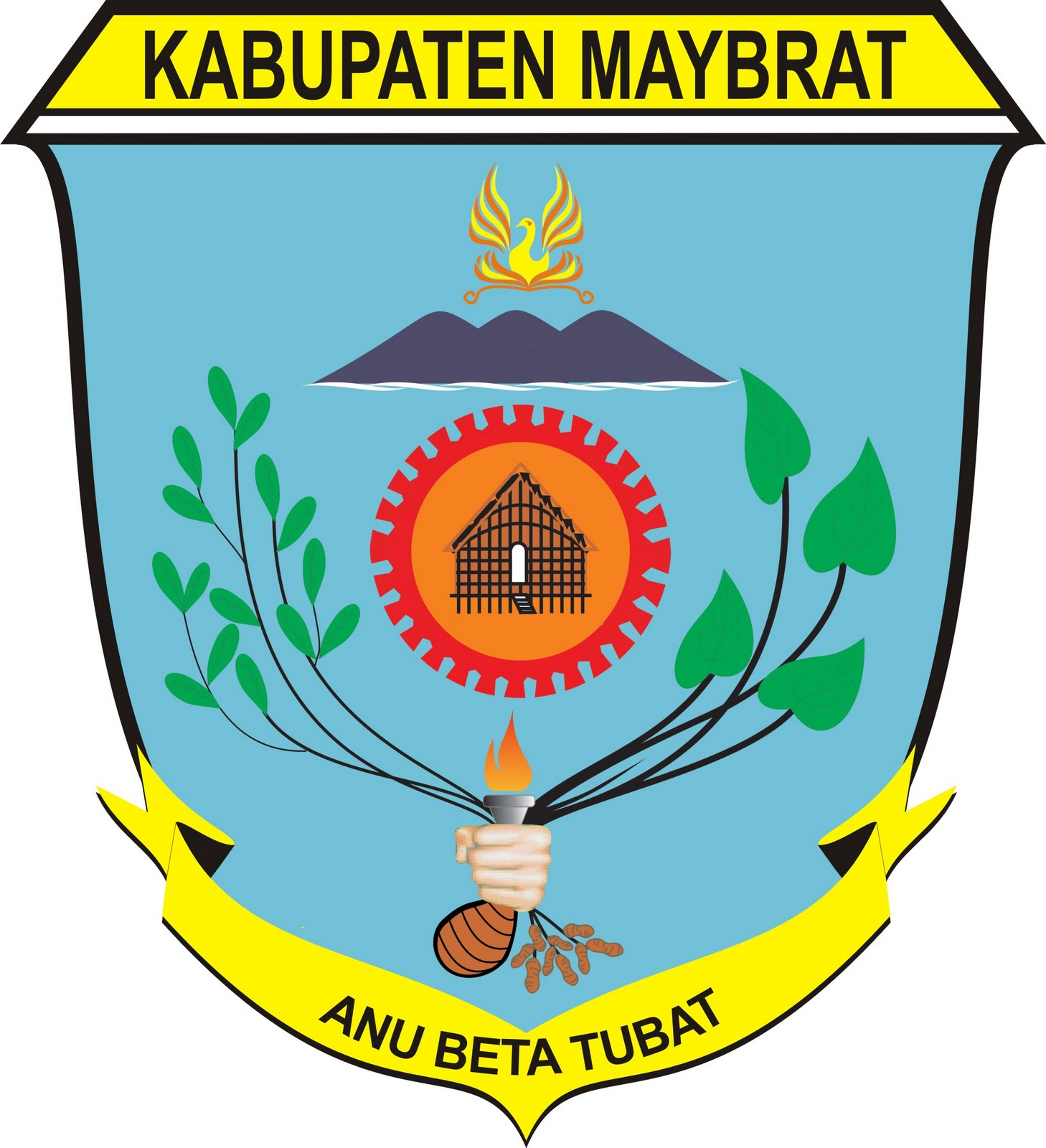
- Coat of arms
- Motto(s): Anu Beta Tubat (Together We Lift)
- Location in Southwest Papua

- Location in Indonesia
- Coordinates: 1°17′33″S 132°22′54″E
- Country: Indonesia
- Province: Southwest Papua
- Capital: Kumurkek

Government
  - Regent: Karel Murafer
  - Vice Regent: Ferdinando Solossa

Area
  - Total: 5,461.69 km^{2} (2,108.77 sq mi)

Population (mid 2023 estimate)
  - Total: 46,287
  - Density: 8.4748/km^{2} (21.950/sq mi)
- Time zone: UTC+9 (Indonesia Eastern Time)
- Area code: (+62) 986

Maybrat Regency is a regency of Southwest Papua Province of Indonesia. It has an area of 5,461.69 km^{2} (2,108.77 sq mi), and had a population of 33,081 at the 2010 Census and 42,991 at the 2020 Census; the official estimate as at mid 2023 was 46,287 (comprising 23,330 males and 22,957 females). The administrative centre is the town of Kumurkek, in Aifat District. The Maybrat language is spoken in the regency.

== Geography ==
Maybrat Regency is located in the western part of Papua Island. Geographically, Maybrat Regency is located at 131º 421 0” east longitude - 132º 581 12” east and 0º 55' 12” south longitude - 2º 17' 24” south longitude. It is the provinces's only landlocked regency, and is bordered:

- to the north by Tambrauw Regency (Fef District, Senopi District and Kebar District);
- to the east by Teluk Bintuni Regency of West Papua Province (North Moskona District, Masyeta District and South Moskona District);
- to the south by South Sorong Regency (Kais District, Moswaren District, and Wayer District).
- to the west by South Sorong Regency (Teminabuan District, Sawiat District and Fokour District).

== Administrative districts ==
At the 2010 Census, the Maybrat Regency comprised eleven districts (distrik), tabulated below with their areas and their populations at the 2010 Census. In 2013 thirteen additional districts were formed by division from the existing districts; these are included below, together with the populations at the 2020 Census of all twenty-four current districts, and their official estimates as at mid 2023. The table also includes the locations of the district administrative centres, the number of administrative villages in each district (totaling 259 rural kampung and 1 urban kelurahan), and its post codes.

Kode Kemendagri	Name of District (distrik)	Area in km^{2}	Pop'n 2010 Census	Pop'n 2020 Census	Pop'n mid 2023 Estimate	Admin centre	No. of villages	Post code
92.10.05	Aitinyo Barat (West Aitinyo)	332.32	2,375	1,397	1,349	Kambufatem	9	98262
92.10.17	Ayamaru Selatan Jaya (South Ayamaru Jaya)	^{(a)}	^{(a)}	1,557	1,865	Arus	7	98244
92.10.06	Aitinyo	848.36	5,150	2,815	2,683	Aitinyo	17	98261
92.10.22	Aitinyo Tengah (Central Aitinyo)	^{(b)}	^{(b)}	1,241	1,183	Yaksoro	14	98264
92.10.04	Aifat Selatan (South Aifat)	408.12	1,514	2,418	2,701	Kisor	16	98272
92.10.14	Aifat Timur Selatan (Southeast Aifat)	^{(c)}	^{(c)}	241	230	Kambuscato	6	98275
92.10.01	Aifat	566.81	3,512	3,659	3,527	Kumurkek	23	98271
92.10.07	Aitinyo Utara (North Aitinyo)	386.28	2,620	1,541	1,474	Fategomi	12	98265
92.10.23	Aitinyo Raya (Great Aitinyo)	^{(d)}	^{(d)}	1,316	1,322	Jitmau	10	98265
92.10.10	Ayamaru Timur (East Ayamaru)	126.09	1,201	1,485	1,824	Kambuaya	8	98246
92.10.18	Ayamaru Timur Selatan (Southeast Ayamaru)	^{(e)}	^{(e)}	1,119	1,290	Kambuskato	7	98247
92.10.08	Ayamaru	538.60	5,592	2,757	3,139	Mefkajin	8 ^{(f)}	98240
92.10.15	Ayamaru Selatan (South Ayamaru)	^{(g)}	^{(g)}	2,026	2,071	Koma-Koma	10	98243
92.10.16	Ayamaru Jaya (Great Ayamaru)	^{(g)}	^{(g)}	2,520	2,692	Segior	10	98242
92.10.20	Ayamaru Tengah (Central Ayamaru)	^{(g)}	^{(g)}	2,433	2,917	Kartapura	10	98245
92.10.21	Ayamaru Barat (West Ayamaru)	^{(g)}	^{(g)}	1,435	2,120	Soroan	8	98241
92.10.09	Ayamaru Utara (North Ayamaru)	442.95	3,846	2,639	2,673	Yukase	11	98248
92.10.19	Ayamaru Utara Timur (Northeast Ayamaru)	^{(h)}	^{(h)}	1,245	1,232	Mapura	8	98249
92.10.11	Mare	733.50	1,083	1,738	2,313	Suswa	9	98251
92.10.24	Mare Selatan (South Mare)	^{(j)}	^{(j)}	1,232	1,497	Fase	9	98252
92.10.02	Aifat Utara (North Aifat)	519.38	3,666	3,079	2,934	Ayawasi	20	98277
92.10.03	Aifat Timur (East Aifat)	559.28	2,522	1,168	1,339	Aisa	11	98273
92.10.12	Aifat Timur Tengah (East Central Aifat)	^{(k)}	^{(k)}	1,301	1,313	Ayata	10	98276
92.10.13	Aifat Timur Jauh (East Aifat Jauh)	^{(k)}	^{(k)}	629	599	Ainesa	7	98274
	Totals	5,461.69	33,081	42,991	46,287	Kumurkek	260	

Notes:
(a) The area and 2010 Census population of what is now Ayamaru Selatan Jaya District are included in the total figures for Aitinyo Barat District, from which it was divided.
(b) The area and 2010 Census population of what is now Aitinyo Tengah District are included in the total figures for Aitinyo District, from which it was divided.
(c) The area and 2010 Census population of what is now Aifat Timur Selatan District are included in the total figures for Aifat Selatan District, from which it was divided.
(d) The area and 2010 Census population of what is now Aitinyo Raya District are included in the total figures for Aitinyo Utara District, from which it was divided.
(e) The area and 2010 Census population of what is now Ayamaru Timur Selatan District are included in the total figures for Ayamaru Timur District, from which it was divided.
(f) including the kelurahan of Ayamaru (town).
(g) The areas and 2010 Census populations of what are now Ayamaru Selatan, Ayamaru Jaya, Ayamaru Tengah and Ayamaru Barat Districts are included in the total figures for Ayamaru District, from which they were all divided.
(h) The area and 2010 Census population of what is now Ayamaru Utara Timur District are included in the total figures for Ayamaru Utara District, from which it was divided.
(j) The area and 2010 Census population of what is now Mare Selatan District are included in the total figures for Mare District, from which it was divided.
(k) The areas and 2010 Census populations of what are now Aifat Timur Tengah and Aifat Timur Jauh Districts are included in the total figures for Aifat Timur District, from which they were both divided.

== Climate ==
Kumurkek has a tropical rainforest climate (Af) with heavy to very heavy rainfall year-round.

Climate data for Kumurkek
Month	Jan	Feb	Mar	Apr	May	Jun	Jul	Aug	Sep	Oct	Nov	Dec	Year
Mean daily maximum °C (°F)	29.7 (85.5)	29.5 (85.1)	29.5 (85.1)	29.6 (85.3)	29.4 (84.9)	28.7 (83.7)	28.2 (82.8)	28.1 (82.6)	28.7 (83.7)	29.6 (85.3)	29.9 (85.8)	29.9 (85.8)	29.2 (84.6)
Daily mean °C (°F)	26.0 (78.8)	26.0 (78.8)	26.1 (79.0)	26.1 (79.0)	26.1 (79.0)	25.6 (78.1)	25.2 (77.4)	25.0 (77.0)	25.4 (77.7)	26.0 (78.8)	26.2 (79.2)	26.2 (79.2)	25.8 (78.5)
Mean daily minimum °C (°F)	22.4 (72.3)	22.6 (72.7)	22.8 (73.0)	22.7 (72.9)	22.8 (73.0)	22.5 (72.5)	22.2 (72.0)	22.0 (71.6)	22.2 (72.0)	22.4 (72.3)	22.6 (72.7)	22.6 (72.7)	22.5 (72.5)
Average rainfall mm (inches)	272 (10.7)	254 (10.0)	279 (11.0)	297 (11.7)	347 (13.7)	315 (12.4)	277 (10.9)	262 (10.3)	249 (9.8)	217 (8.5)	199 (7.8)	243 (9.6)	3,211 (126.4)
Source: Climate-Data.org
