= Waibeem =

Waibeem Kampung Waibeem
- Village
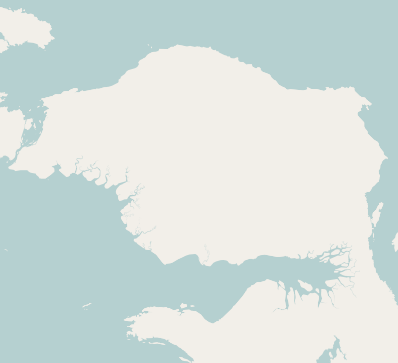
- Location of the village in the Bird's Head Peninsula
- Coordinates: 0°28′S 132°58′E
- Country: Indonesia
- Province: Southwest Papua
- Regency: Tambrauw
- District: Abun

Population
  - Total: 239
- Time zone: UTC+9 (WIT)

Waibeem or Waibim is a village in Abun in Tambrauw Regency of Southwest Papua, Indonesia. The town is located on the northern coast of the Bird's Head Peninsula, also known as the Vogelkop peninsula. The village has a population of 239 people, 200 people at least speak a language known as the Abun language, common to this coastline.

== 2009 Papua earthquakes ==
In early January 2009, a very large earthquake doublet affected West Papua. The two shocks measured 7.6 and 7.4 on the moment magnitude scale with maximum intensities of VI (Strong) and VIII (Severe).
