= Fef, Southwest Papua =

Fef Distrik Fef
- District
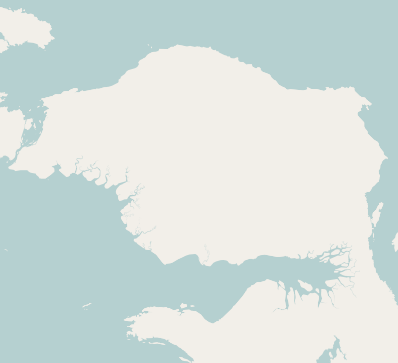
- Location of the town in the Bird's Head Peninsula Fef (Indonesia)
- Coordinates: 0°48′36″S 132°25′56″E
- Country: Indonesia
- Province: Southwest Papua
- Regency: Tambrauw Regency

Area
  - Total: 365,987 km^{2} (141,308 sq mi)

Population (2020)
  - Total: 966
  - Density: 1.02/km^{2} (2.64/sq mi)
- Time zone: UTC+9 (IEST)

Fef (also known as Peef) a district in Tambrauw Regency, Southwest Papua, Indonesia. It is the capital of the Tambrauw Regency and the administrative center of the Tambrauw Regency. It had a population of 428 as of 2010 and 966 at the 2020 Census.

== Demography ==
=== Population ===
As of the 2010 census, the population of Fef was 428.

Year	Population
2010	428
2020	966

* 2010 Population census

* 2020 Population census

== Climate ==
Fef has a tropical rainforest climate (Af) with heavy to very heavy rainfall year-round.

Climate data for Fef
Month	Jan	Feb	Mar	Apr	May	Jun	Jul	Aug	Sep	Oct	Nov	Dec	Year
Mean daily maximum °C (°F)	27.4 (81.3)	27.3 (81.1)	27.1 (80.8)	27.2 (81.0)	26.9 (80.4)	26.3 (79.3)	25.6 (78.1)	25.6 (78.1)	26.3 (79.3)	27.4 (81.3)	27.7 (81.9)	27.6 (81.7)	26.9 (80.4)
Daily mean °C (°F)	23.6 (74.5)	23.7 (74.7)	23.6 (74.5)	23.7 (74.7)	23.5 (74.3)	23.2 (73.8)	22.6 (72.7)	22.5 (72.5)	22.9 (73.2)	23.6 (74.5)	23.8 (74.8)	23.8 (74.8)	23.4 (74.1)
Mean daily minimum °C (°F)	19.9 (67.8)	20.1 (68.2)	20.2 (68.4)	20.2 (68.4)	20.2 (68.4)	20.1 (68.2)	19.7 (67.5)	19.5 (67.1)	19.6 (67.3)	19.9 (67.8)	20.0 (68.0)	20.1 (68.2)	20.0 (67.9)
Average rainfall mm (inches)	247 (9.7)	244 (9.6)	254 (10.0)	288 (11.3)	355 (14.0)	340 (13.4)	309 (12.2)	295 (11.6)	259 (10.2)	221 (8.7)	204 (8.0)	238 (9.4)	3,254 (128.1)
Source: Climate-Data.org
