= Moraid language =

Language in Papua

Moraid
- Moi Moraid
- Native to: Indonesia
- Region: Moraid District, Tambrauw Regency, Southwest Papua
- Ethnicity: Moi Moraid
- Native speakers: (1,000 cited 1988)
- Language family: West Papuan?: Bird's Head; West Bird's Head; Moraid

Language codes
- ISO 639-3: msg
- Glottolog: mora1239
- Coordinates: 0.723216°S 131.821021°E

Moraid is a Papuan language spoken by the Moi Moraid people in the district of Moraid in the Bird's Head Peninsula of New Guinea. This language is mainly spoken in Moraid and several districts on the border of Sorong Regency and Tambrauw Regency, Southwest Papua.
