= Mpur language =

Isolate language spoken in Indonesia

Mpur
- Amberbaken
- Native to: Indonesia
- Region: Mpur and Amberbaken Districts, Tambrauw Regency, Southwest Papua on the north coast of the Bird's Head Peninsula
- Native speakers: 5,000 (2002)
- Language family: Language isolate
- Dialects: Sirir; Ajiw

Language codes
- ISO 639-3: akc
- Glottolog: mpur1239
- ELP: Mpur
- Coordinates: 0.75°S 133.17°E

Mpur (also known as Amberbaken, Kebar, Ekware, and Dekwambre) is a language isolate spoken in and around Mpur and Amberbaken Districts in Tambrauw Regency of the Bird's Head Peninsula, New Guinea. It is not closely related to any other language, and though Ross (2005) tentatively assigned it to the West Papuan languages, based on similarities in pronouns, Palmer (2018), Ethnologue, and Glottolog list it as a language isolate.

== Locations ==
In Tambrauw Regency, ethnic Mpur people reside in Kebar District, Kebar Timur District, Manekar District, Amberbaken District, Mubrani District, and Senopi District. Villages include Akmuri, Nekori, Ibuanari, Atai, Anjai, Jandurau, Ajami, Inam, Senopi, Asiti, Wausin, and Afrawi.

== Phonology ==
=== Consonants ===
Consonants in Mpur are:

Consonants
		Labial	Alveolar	Palatal	Velar
Nasal		m	n (Note: /n/ is pronounced as [ŋ] when preceding /k/.)		
Plosive	voiceless	p	t		k (Note: /k/ is pronounced as [ɡ] when following /n/ which is pronounced as [ŋ].)
Plosive	voiced	b	d (Note: /d/ is pronounced as [ɾ] when not in initial position, except after /n/.)		
Affricate				t͡ʃ	
Fricative		ɸ	s		
Semivowel		w (Note: /w/ can also be pronounced as [β].)		j	

=== Vowels ===
Mpur has five vowels: /a, e, i, o, u/.

=== Tones ===
Mpur has a complex tonal system with 4 lexical tones and an additional contour tone, a compound of two of the lexical tones. Its tonal system is somewhat similar to the nearby Austronesian languages of Mor and Ma'ya. The neighboring language isolate Abun is also tonal.

Mpur has four lexical tones. There is also a fifth complex contour tone formed as a phonetic compound of two lexical tones. An example minimal set is given below.

- bé ‘but’ (high tone)
- be ‘in’ (mid tone)
- bè ‘fruit’ (low tone)

== Vocabulary comparison ==
The following basic vocabulary words are from Miedema & Welling (1985), as cited in the Trans-New Guinea database:

gloss	Mpur (Arfu dialect)	Mpur (Kebar dialect)
head	èbuam	èbuam
hair	byambur	buambor
eye	éyam	yam
tooth	èbir	bir
leg	pirik	èipèt
louse	iːm	èyim
dog	p(y)èr	pir
pig	duao	duaw
bird	iw (ip)	if
egg	bua	bua
blood	éfar	far
bone	éip	ip
skin	(è)fièk	fièk
tree	perahu	perau
man	dèmonip	mamir
sun	put	put
water	war	war
fire	yit	yèt
stone	biːt	bit
name	muk	emuk
eat	èryèt	barièt
one	tu	tu
two	dokir	dukir
