= Seget language =

Papuan language of New Guinea

Seget
- Native to: Indonesia
- Region: Sorong Regency, Southwest Papua: Salawati, Seget District, Segun District, Sorong
- Native speakers: (1,200 cited 1988)
- Language family: West Papuan?: Bird's Head; West Bird's Head; Seget

Language codes
- ISO 639-3: sbg
- Glottolog: sege1235

Seget is a Papuan language spoken by the Moi Lamas tribe in Bird's Head Peninsula of New Guinea. It is spoken southwest of Sorong, in Walian, Sailolof, Segum, and Seget villages in Sorong Regency, Southwest Papua. Walian and Sailolof are villages (kampung) located in Salawati. Seget and Segun are currently districts in Sorong Regency.
