= Moraid, Southwest Papua =

Moraid Distrik Moraid
- District
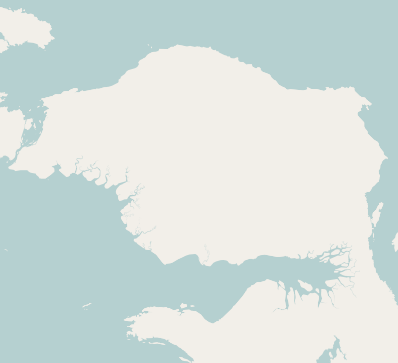
- Location of the town in the Bird's Head Peninsula
- Coordinates: 0°40′0″S 131°57′00″E
- Country: Indonesia
- Province: Southwest Papua
- Regency: Tambrauw Regency

Area
  - Total: 499.012 km^{2} (192.670 sq mi)

Population (2020 Census)
  - Total: 1,122
  - Density: 2.25/km^{2} (5.8/sq mi)
- Time zone: UTC+9 (WIT)

Moraid is a district in the Tambrauw Regency of Southwest Papua, Indonesia. The town is located on the northern coast of the Bird's Head Peninsula, also known as the Vogelkop Peninsula.
