= Klaso =

District in Southwest Papua, Indonesia

- District
- Interactive map of Klaso
- Coordinates: 0°47′5.3243″S 131°48′18.2531″E
- Country: Indonesia
- Province: Southwest Papua
- Regency: Sorong
- District seat: Siwis

Area
  - Total: 345.03 km^{2} (133.22 sq mi)

Population (mid 2024 estimate)
  - Total: 1,244
  - Density: 3.605/km^{2} (9.338/sq mi)
- Time zone: UTC+9 (WIT)
- Postal Code: 98456
- Villages: 7

Klaso is an administrative district (distrik) in Sorong Regency, Southwest Papua, Indonesia.

== Geography ==
Klaso District consists of 7 villages (kampung), namely:

- Siwis
- Miskum
- Klamugun
- Sbaga
- Klalik
- Malawhili
- Klasou
