= Kwoor =

Kwoor Distrik Kwoor
- District
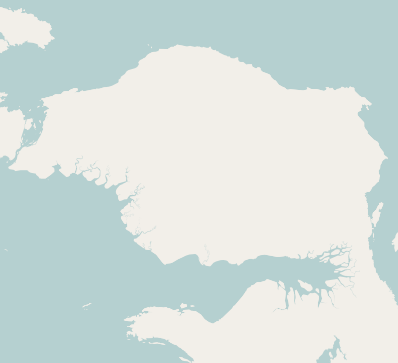
- Location in the Bird's Head Peninsula Location in Southwest Papua Location in Indonesia
- Coordinates: 0°26′59″S 132°19′59″E
- Country: Indonesia
- Province: Southwest Papua
- Regency: Tambrauw Regency

Area
  - Total: 212.140 km^{2} (81.908 sq mi)

Population (2021)
  - Total: 794
  - Density: 3.74/km^{2} (9.7/sq mi)
- Time zone: UTC+9 (IEST)

Kwoor (also known as Koor) is a District of Tambrauw Regency in Southwest Papua, Indonesia.

== Demography ==
=== Population ===
As of the 2010 census, the population of Kwoor was 961.

Year	Population
2010	961
2020	794

* 2010 Population census

* 2020 Population census
