= Abun language =

Papuan language in New Guinea

Abun
- Native to: Southwest Papua
- Region: Tambrauw Regency, Bird's Head Peninsula: Ayamaru, Moraid, and Sausapor sub-districts - about 20 villages
- Native speakers: (3,000 cited 1995)
- Language family: West Papuan or language isolate: West–Central Bird's Head; Abun
- Dialects: Abun Tat (Karon Pantai); Abun Ji (Madik); Abun Je

Language codes
- ISO 639-3: kgr
- Glottolog: abun1252
- ELP: Abun
- Location within Western New Guinea Location within Indonesia
- Coordinates: 0.57°S 132.42°E

Abun, also known as Yimbun, Anden, Manif, or Karon Pantai, is a Papuan language spoken by the Abun people along the northern coast of the Bird's Head Peninsula in Sausapor District, Tambrauw Regency. It is not closely related to any other language, and though Ross (2005) assigned it to the West Papuan family, based on similarities in pronouns, Palmer (2018), Ethnologue, and Glottolog list it as a language isolate.

Abun used to have three lexical tones, but only two are distinguished now as minimal pairs and even these are found in limited vocabulary. Therefore, Abun is said to be losing its tonality due to linguistic change.

Being spoken along the coast of northwestern New Guinea, Abun is in contact with Austronesian languages; maritime vocabulary in Abun has been borrowed from Biak.

== Setting and dialects ==
The speakers number about 3,000 spread across 18 villages and several isolated hamlets. The Abun area occupies a stretch of the northern coast of the Bird's Head Peninsula. The neighbouring languages are Moi to the southwest along the coast, Moraid and Karon Dori to the south (the latter is a dialect of Maybrat), and Mpur to the east.

The Abun speakers refer to their language as either Abun or Anden. Several other names are in use by neighbouring groups: the Moi call it Madik, the Mpur refer to it as Yimbun or Yembun, while among the Biak people it is known as Karon Pantai, a term with derogatory connotations.

Abun has four distinct dialects: Abun Tat, Abun Ye, and the two dialects of Abun Ji. The two Abun Ji dialects are differentiated by their use of /r/ or /l/. Abun exists on a dialect continuum from Abun Tat to Abun Ji /l/: speakers of Abun Tat are less able to understand Abun Ji than Abun Ye.

== Phonology ==
Abun has 5 vowels: /i, e, ɑ, o, u/.

Consonants
		Labial	Alveolar	Postalveolar\ Palatal	Velar
Plosive/ Affricate	voiceless	p	t		k
Plosive/ Affricate	voiced	b	d	d͡ʒ	g
Plosive/ Affricate	prenasal.	ᵐb	ⁿd	ⁿd͡ʒ	ᵑɡ
Fricative		f	s	ʃ	
Nasal		m	n	ɲ	
Approximant			l	j	w
Trill			r		

=== Tones ===
Abun has three lexical tones, which are high, mid, and low. A minimal set showing all three tones:

ʃúr ʃè
water flow
'the water flows'

ʃúr ʃé
water flood
'a big flood'

ʃúr ʃe
water big
'a big river'

High/rising tones can also be used to mark plurals (Berry & Berry 1999:21).

- ndam 'bird', ndám 'birds'
- nu 'house', nú 'houses'
- gwa 'taro tuber', gwá 'taro tubers'

== Grammar ==
Abun has bipartite negation like French, using the pre-predicate negator yo and post-predicate negator nde. Both are obligatory. Example:

Án yo ma mo nu nde.
3PL NEG come to house NEG
'They didn't come to the house.'

Like the other language isolates of the northern Bird's Head Peninsula, Abun is a heavily isolating language, with many one-to-one word-morpheme correspondences, as shown in the example sentence below.

Men ben suk mo nggwe yo, men ben suk sino.
1PL do thing LOC garden then 1PL do thing together
'If we do things at the garden, then we do them together.'

== Vocabulary comparison ==
The following basic vocabulary words are from Miedema & Welling (1985) and Voorhoeve (1975), as cited in the Trans-New Guinea database:

gloss	Abun (Karon Pantai dialect)	Abun (Senopi dialect)	Abun (Jembun dialect)
head	məsu	tana	mesu
hair	go	mauwyan	usugo
eye	ŋgro	tasu	da
tooth	sios	jasièm	mesos
leg	kwes	taow	mengwès
louse	mim	xatè	
dog	ndar	(n)dax	dar
pig	yot	fani	nox; yot
bird	namgau	eruː	daːm
egg	bem	yayuf	beːm
blood	nde	mès	dè
bone	dini	tey	diniéː
skin	da	tarak	menda
tree	kew	ara	key
man	bris	raysmiː	yeːtu
sun	kam	ayom	kaːm
water	sur	aya	sur
fire	bot	tafox	boːt
stone	jok	fra	yok
name	gum	tasom	tagum
eat	git	téyt	mengi
one	dik	sow	dik
two	we	ai	wè

== Sources ==
- Berry, Christine; Berry, Keith (1999). A description of Abun: a west Papuan language of Irian Jaya (PDF). Pacific Linguistics Series B, Volume 115. Research School of Pacific and Asian Studies, Australian National University. ISBN 0-85883-482-0.
