= Tambrauw Regency =

Regency in Southwest Papua, Indonesia

Tambrauw Regency Kabupaten Tambrauw
- Regency
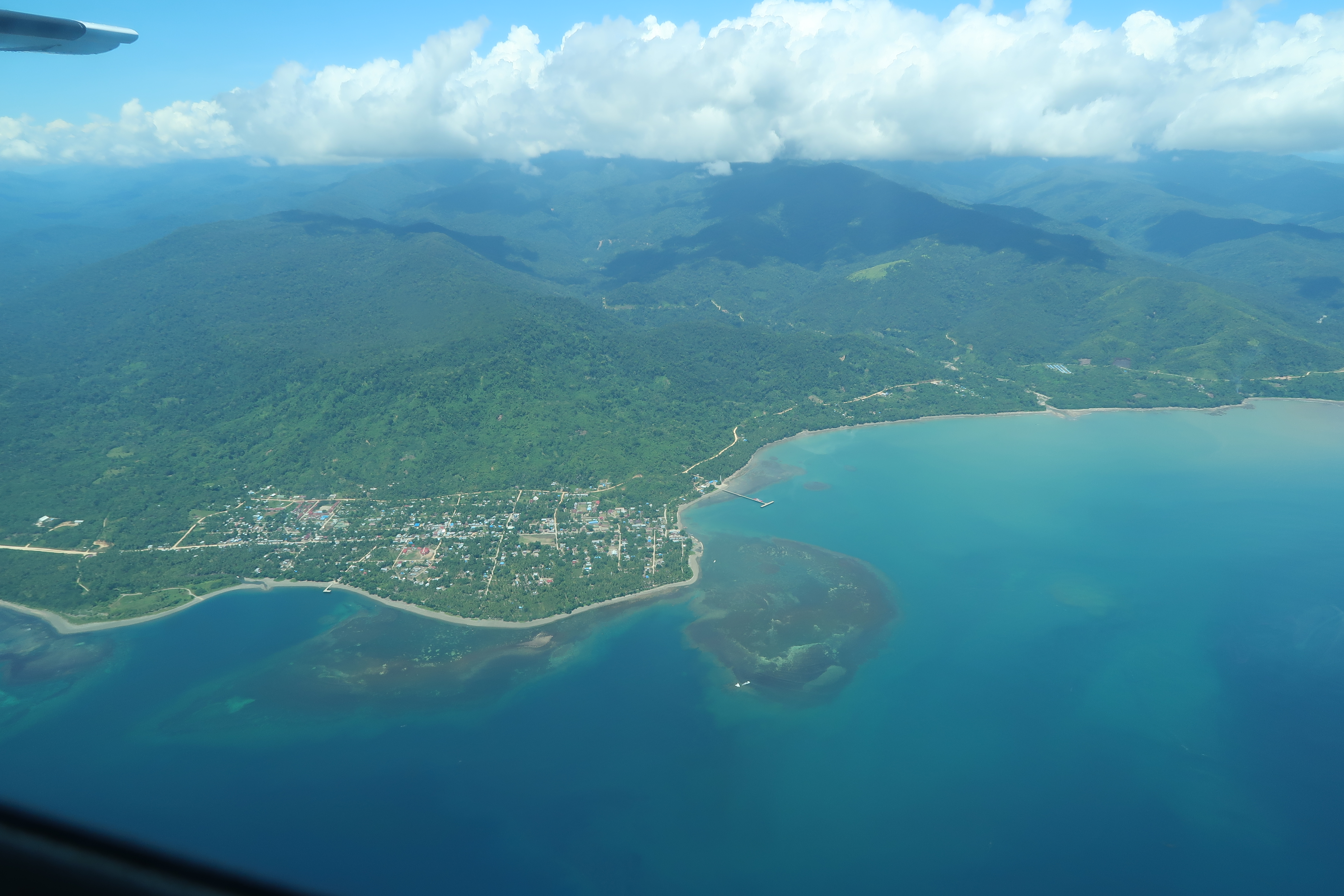

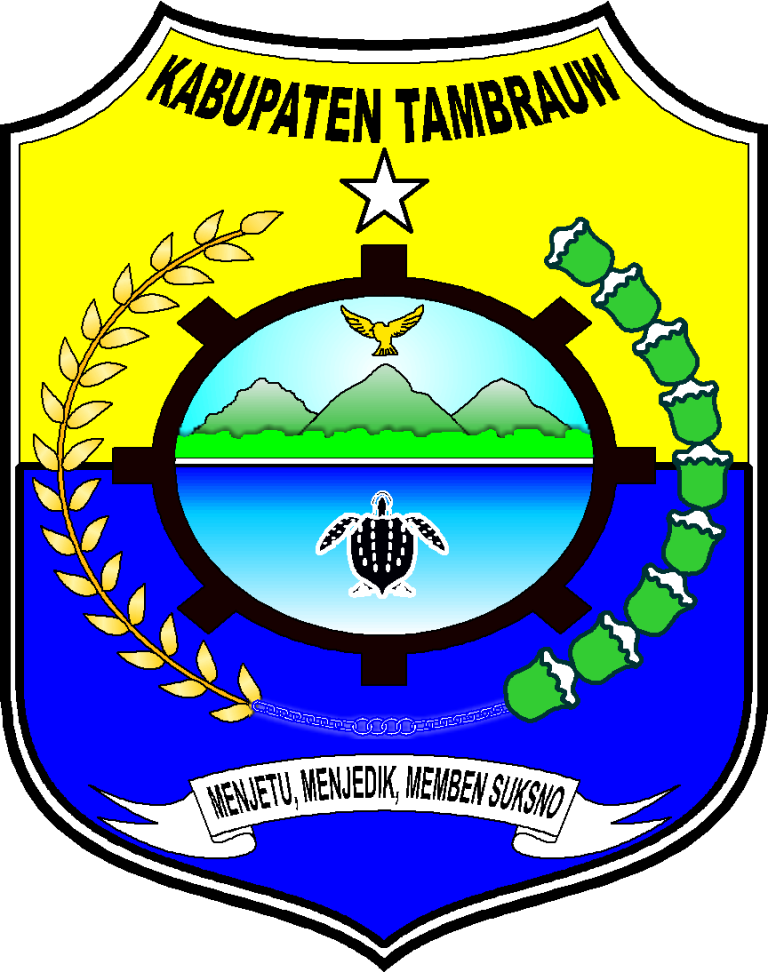
- Coat of arms
- Motto: Menjetu, Menjedik, Memben Suksno (We are brothers, united in heart, to build)
- Location in Southwest Papua

- Location in Indonesia
- Coordinates: 0.6051°S 132.4896°E
- Country: Indonesia
- Province: Southwest Papua
- Capital: Fef

Government
  - Regent: Yeskiel Yesnath
  - Vice Regent: Paulus Ajambuani

Area
  - Total: 11,529.18 km^{2} (4,451.44 sq mi)

Population (mid 2023 estimate)
  - Total: 40,672
  - Density: 3.5277/km^{2} (9.1368/sq mi)
- Time zone: UTC+9 (Indonesia Eastern Time)
- Postcodes: 98473
- Area code: (+62) 969
- Website: tambrauwkab.go.id

Tambrauw Regency (Indonesian pronunciation: [ˈt̪ambrau]) is a regency of Southwest Papua Province, Indonesia, in the Bird's Head Peninsula of Papua Island. It was created on 29 October 2008 from what had been an eastern part of Sorong Regency, originally as part of the province of West Papua. Much of the regency is located on the Tamrau Mountains that the local government declarated Tambrauw as a "conservation regency".

== Geography ==
Tambrauw Regency is a new regency located in Southwest Papua Province. Geographically, Tambrauw Regency is located at 132°35' east longitude – 134°45' east longitude and 0°15' south latitude - 3°25' south latitude. Geographical position is very strategic because it is located in the West – East movement of Papua Island and bordering sea waters are an international transportation route, so that the development of facilities and infrastructure for Tambrauw Regency in the future can take advantage of the opportunities of this strategic geographical position (egport development).

In 2010 its area covered 5,179.65 km^{2}, and it had a population of just 6,145 at the 2010 Census. However, in 2013 the existing regency was expanded by the addition of four districts from Manokwari Regency (Kebar, Amberbaken, Mubarni/Arfu and Senopi) and by one further district (Moraid) from Sorong Regency. The administrative centre lies at the village of Fef. The Regency now has an area of 11,529.18 km^{2}, and it had a population of 28,379 at the 2020 Census; the official estimate as at mid 2023 was 40,672. It is served by Werur Airport.

== Climatology ==
Tambrauw Regency has a humid tropical climate with rainfall ranging between 2,200 and 2,500 mm per year. The average annual rainfall is 110 mm with an average of 16 rainy days per month. The highest rainfall occurs in March reaching 337 mm, while the lowest rainfall occurred in August when it reaches 11 mm. The highest rainy day occurs in March, reaching 21 days, while the lowest rainy days occur in April, May and October when it reaches 13 days.

== Languages ==
The language isolates Abun and Mpur are spoken in Tambrauw Regency. Moraid, Meyah, and other languages are also spoken in the regency.

== History ==
World War II

Tambrauw Regency, in the province of Southwest Papua, was significantly impacted during World War II, although it is not often mentioned in the grand narrative of the conflict. During the war, the region was part of the wider Pacific front, as Japan attempted to expand its influence in Papua, including Tambrauw. The Japanese established military and logistics posts in the region, which affected the lives of local people by involving them in forced labor and causing significant economic hardship. Although no major battles were recorded in Tambrauw Regency, the tensions and impacts of the war were still felt, particularly through Allied military operations that took place in the surrounding area. After the war ended in 1945, Papua returned to Dutch control before finally joining the Republic of Indonesia in 1960. The legacy of this period of war can still be seen through the historical legacy and lasting social impacts, which continue to affect the people of Tambrauw to this day.

== Administrative districts ==
In 2010, the existing regency comprised seven districts (distrik), tabulated below with their areas and their populations at the 2010 Census, together with their estimated populations in mid 2013:

| Name of District (distrik) | Area in km^{2} | Pop'n 2010 Census | Pop'n mid 2013 Estimate |
|---|---|---|---|
| Fef | 562.87 | 428 | 436 |
| Syujak | 244.64 | 211 | 214 |
| Miyah | 411.56 | 363 | 364 |
| Abun | 837.76 | 602 | 617 |
| Kwoor | 1,430.77 | 931 | 956 |
| Sausapor | 633.23 | 2,633 | 2,764 |
| Yembun | 1,058.82 | 976 | 1,000 |

The four districts which were added from Manokwari Regency and the single district added from Sorong Regency in 2013 are tabulated below with their areas and their populations at the 2010 Census, together with their estimated populations in mid 2013:

| Name of District (distrik) | Area in km^{2} | Pop'n 2010 Census | Pop'n mid 2013 Estimate | Districts from 2013 |
|---|---|---|---|---|
| Kebar | 1,858.86 | 2,021 | 2,031 | Kebar, Kebar Timur, Kebar Selantan, Manekar |
| Senopi | 2,539.79 | 755 | 759 | Senopi, Mawabuan |
| Amberbaken | 866.75 | 1,876 | 1,887 | Amberbaken, Mpur, Amberbakem Barat |
| Mubrani/Arfu | 213.08 | 669 | 673 | Mubrani |
| Moraid | 871.06 | 1,717 | 1,796 | Morais, Selemkai |

Subsequent to 2013, seventeen further districts were subsequently created by the division of existing districts, and the total in the regency now comprises twenty-nine districts in all. The areas and populations at the 2020 Census of these districts are tabulated below, together with the official estimates as of mid-2023. The table also includes the locations of the district administrative centres, the number of administrative villages (all classed as rural kampung) in each district, and their post codes.

| Kode Kemendagri | Name of District (distrik) | Area in km^{2} | Pop'n 2020 Census | Pop'n mid 2023 Estimate | Admin centre | No. of villages | Post code |
|---|---|---|---|---|---|---|---|
| 92.09.01 | Fef | 365.99 | 966 | 1,436 | Fef | 10 | 98366 |
| 92.09.07 | Syujak | 356.53 | 820 | 1,219 | Syujak | 4 | 98374 |
| 92.09.15 | Ases | 275.78 | 349 | 519 | Ases | 4 | 98364 |
| 92.09.20 | Tinggouw | 226.28 | 304 | 452 | Soon | 5 | 98375 |
| 92.09.02 | Miyah | 187.61 | 603 | 896 | Siakwa | 8 | 98371 |
| 92.09.16 | Miyar Selatan (South Miyah) | 461.76 | 691 | 1,027 | Ayamane | 7 | 98372 |
| 92.09.17 | Ireres | 431.50 | 573 | 851 | Miri | 6 | 98367 |
| 92.09.19 | Wilhem Roumbouts | 185.01 | 179 | 266 | Tabamsere | 4 | 98377 |
| 92.09.06 | Abun | 845.91 | 739 | 933 | Waibem | 7 | 98363 |
| 92.09.09 | Kwoor | 212.14 | 794 | 1,206 | Kwoor | 6 | 98369 |
| 92.09.18 | Tobouw | 569.59 | 608 | 925 | Syumbab | 5 | 98376 |
| 92.09.21 | Kwesefo | 379.54 | 759 | 1,152 | Kwesefo | 7 | 98368 |
| 92.09.05 | Sausapor | 457.47 | 6,461 | 9,597 | Emaos | 10 | 98373 |
| 92.09.13 | Bikar | 171.51 | 2,372 | 3,525 | Suyam | 10 | 98365 |
| 92.09.03 | Yembun | 590.63 | 977 | 1,389 | Metnayam | 6 | 98379 |
| 92.09.14 | Bamusbama | 348.96 | 824 | 1,171 | Bamusbama | 6 | 98378 |

| Kode Kemendagri | Name of District (distrik) | Area in km^{2} | Pop'n 2020 Census | Pop'n mid 2023 Estimate | Admin centre | No. of villages | Post code |
|---|---|---|---|---|---|---|---|
| 92.09.09 | Kebar | 174.42 | 1,228 | 1,645 | Anjai | 10 | 98391 |
| 92.09.23 | Kebar Timur (East Kebar) | 420.93 | 582 | 781 | Inam | 13 | 98393 |
| 92.09.24 | Kebar Selatan (South Kebar) | 1,058.70 | 597 | 811 | Nekori | 10 | 98392 |
| 92.09.25 | Manekar | 173.75 | 636 | 841 | Awori | 10 | 98394 |
| 92.09.11 | Senopi | 1,221.73 | 766 | 1,045 | Srurem | 8 | 98396 |
| 92.09.22 | Mawabuan | 431.50 | 443 | 604 | Wausin | 7 | 98395 |
| 92.09.10 | Amberbaken | 269.96 | 1,694 | 2,295 | Warpaperi | 10 | 98381 |
| 92.09.26 | Mpur | 234.60 | 676 | 916 | Wajarek | 6 | 98384 |
| 92.09.27 | Amberbaken Barat (West Amberbaken) | 362.20 | 564 | 764 | Wasawmontem | 5 | 98382 |
| 92.09.12 | Mubrani | 173.32 | 959 | 1,496 | Warokon | 11 | 98385 |
| 92.09.08 | Moraid | 499.01 | 1,122 | 1,335 | Kwade | 9 | 98361 |
| 92.09.29 | Selemkai ^{(a)} | 372.04 | 350 | 416 | Klabili | 5 | 98362 |
| 92.09.28 | Kasi | 70.83 | 743 | 1,159 | Kasi Baru | 7 | 98383 |
| | Totals | 11,529.18 | 28,379 | 40,672 | Fef | 216 | 98377 |

Note: (a) Selemkai District is the most westerly in Tambrauw Regency, being west of Moraid District and along the coast towards Sorong city; it is composed of five villages (kampung) - Della, Klabili, Klasbon, Klasei and Malayauw.
