= Indonesian Papuans =

Eastern Indonesians of Papua-origin

Native Papuans
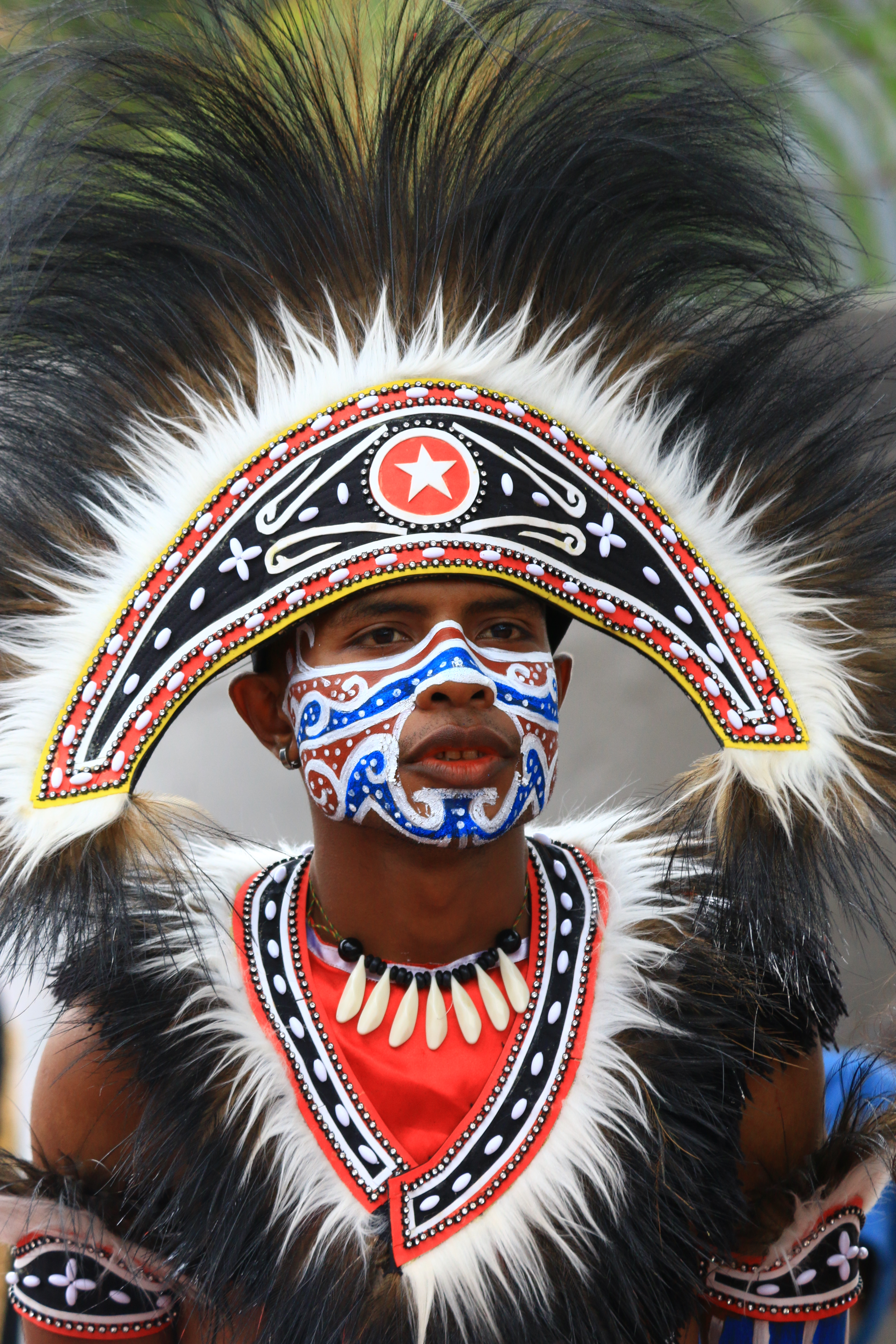
- A Papuan man in his traditional clothes.

Regions with significant populations
- Western New Guinea (provinces of Central Papua, Highland Papua, Southwest Papua, West Papua, South Papua, Papua): ± 2,693,630 (2010)

Languages
- Native/Indigenous; Austronesian; Papuan

Religion
- Predominantly: Papuan folk religion; Christianity (both Catholicism and Protestantism); Also: Animism; Melanesian folk religion; Islam

Related ethnic groups
- Melanesians; Oceanians; Aboriginal Australians

Indonesian Papuans known as indigenous Papuans or native Papuans (Indonesian: Orang Asli Papua, OAP), are the common native-derived internationalized endonym for the native Indonesians of Papua-origin. They are closely related to the Oceanians (and to some extent, the Australian Aboriginals), who natively inhabited the Eastern Indonesian provinces of Central Papua, Highland Papua, Southwest Papua, West Papua, South Papua, and Papua in Indonesia.They natively speak their own native Papuan languages, each with its distinctive and unique linguistic features that may only be found in that region.

The Papuans are one of the indigenous people protected under the national law by the government of Indonesia, to ensure their economic stability and development. However, this is disputed by many with witnesses and videos of Indonesian military incursions, where Papuan villages have been carpet bombed (sometimes using Napalm) and replaced by Indonesian migrants (a form of ethnic cleansing). These bombing incursions led by the Indonesian military would lead to numerous deaths of Papuans.

This perpetual conflict, between Indonesia and the Free Papua Movement (Rebels labelled OPM) with the aim to achieve independence from Indonesia after a flawed independence vote between 14 July and 2 August 1969, continues to turn more and more violent with Indonesia, a state that has been backed by numerous countries and corporations such as BP and Freeport.

== Etymology ==
There are several theories on the origin of the term Papua. One theory is that the name comes from the word Papo Ua shortened from Papo Ua Gam Sio, a Tidorese term which means 'the nine sio (negeri) not being united/joined together', referring to the region under Sultanate of Tidore influence which has competing settlements. The other theory is the term originated from Biak sup i babwa (lit. 'the land below the sunset'), referring to the Raja Ampat Islands as Biak people historically migrated west to these islands from their homeland in the Biak Islands. They claimed themselves to be kawasa ori sar (lit. 'people from the sunrise'). Babwa in Raja Ampat dialects became Papwa and then Papua. These two theories may be related, as the term can also means 'the subjected land' according to the Ma'ya (non-Biak) Salawati King, one of the four kings, whose ancestor Gurabesi migrated from Biak and conquered these islands under the name of Tidore Sultan and became the intermediaries between settlements on New Guinea coast and Tidore in collecting tributes and trades.

== Terminology ==
After the passing of the Special Autonomy Law in 2001, the term "Native Papuan" (Orang Asli Papua, shortened to "OAP") was legally introduced to refer to specifically indigenous peoples from Western New Guinea, as the term "Orang Papua" (lit. 'Papuan people') has expanded to include migrants and their intermarried descendants who were born in Papua but don't belong to any indigenous tribes from New Guinea. Most Papuan peoples, with exceptions, are patrilineal and do not recognize matrilineal descents as members, as they do not carry the clan names. Though contentious, recognition by a tribal adat council can accommodate female descents and confers OAP status.

== Ethnic groups ==
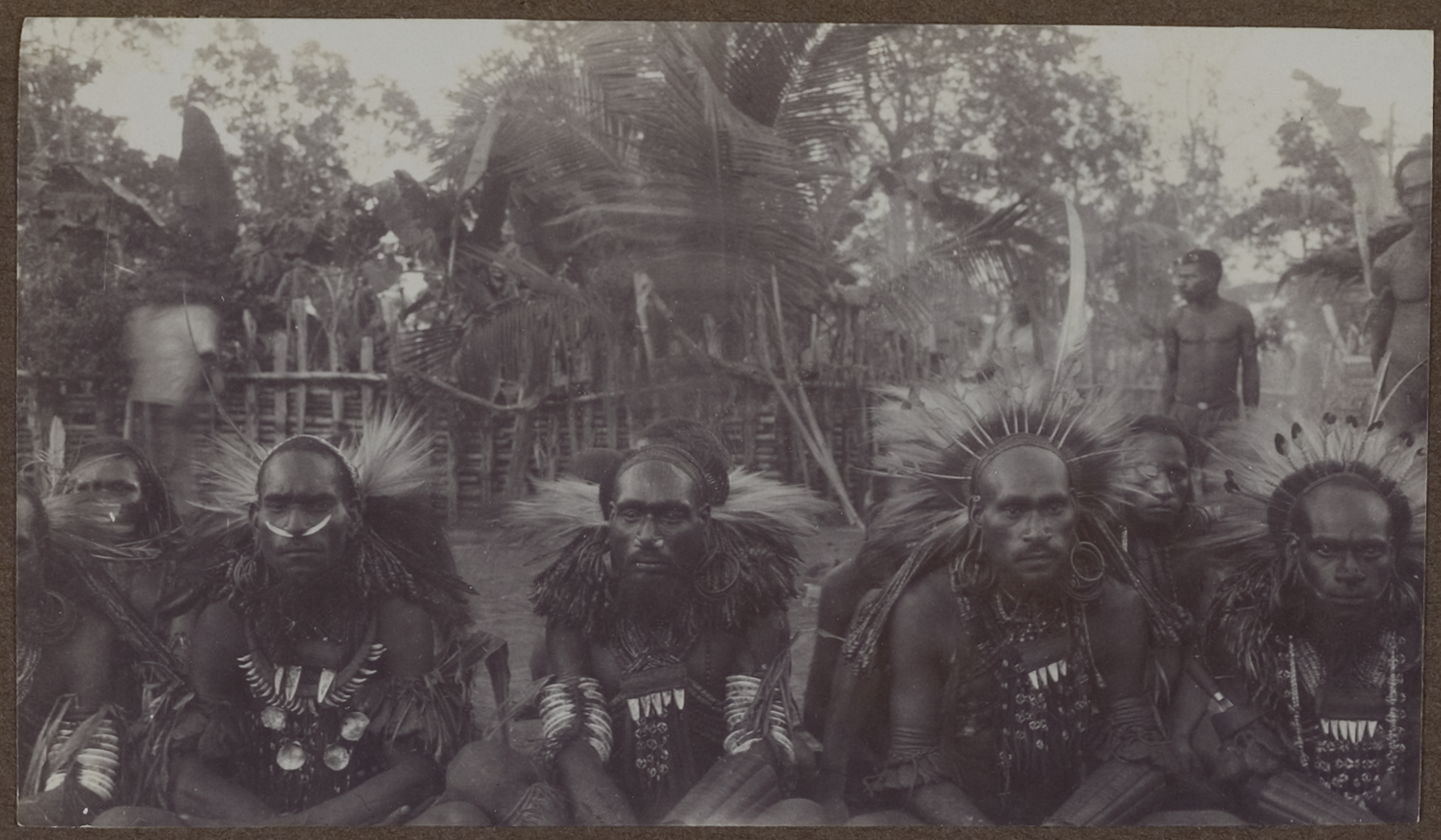
Marind men in Merauke, c. 1930

The Papuans grouped into numerous ethnicities, they possess various cultures and traditions. They are originally tribal community, shared different customs to one another, living in different isolated areas within the region. Austronesian-speaking peoples listed below are italicized.

=== West Papua ===
Papuan ethnic groups/tribes in the Indonesian province of West Papua include: Arfak (Hatam, Meyah, Moile, dan Sougb), Borai, Numfor-Doreri, Irarutu, Koiwai, Kuri, Madewana, Mairasi, Maniwak, Mbaham-Matta, Miere, Moru, Moskona, Napiti, Oburauw, Roon, Roswar, Sebyar (Damban-Kimbaran), Soviar, Sumuri, Wamesa, Warumba, Waruri, Wondama.

=== Southwest Papua ===
Papuan ethnic groups/tribes in the Indonesian province of Southwest Papua include Abun, Ambel, Batanta, Biak (Betew, Kafdaron, Karon, Usba, Wardo), Biga, Butlih, Domu, Duriankere, Gebe (Gag), Fiawat, Imekko (Inanwatan-Bira, Matemani-Iwaro, Kais, Awe, Kokoda-Emeyode), Irires, Ma'ya (Kawe, Laganyan, Wawiyai), Matbat-Matlow, Maybrat (Ayamaru, Mare, Karon Dori-Miyah, Aifat, Aitinyo, Wayer), Moi-Ma'ya, Moi, Mpur, Nerigo, Tehit, Tepin, Yahadian, Yaben-Konda.

=== Papua ===
Papuan ethnic groups/tribes in the Indonesian province of Papua include:

| Jayapura City | Kayu Batu/Kayu Pulau; Tobati; Enggros; Nafri; Skouw; Sentani; Wutung |
| Jayapura Regency | Demta; Kaureh; Kemtuk; Kawamsu; Mekwei; Narau; Gresi; Nimboran; Oria; Ormu; Kapori; Foya; Sauso; Tabla; Tarpia; Taworfa; Yansu; Yamna; Kendate; Tofamna; Bauwi; Sentani |
| Sarmi Regency | Aikwaikai; Airoran; Anus; Baburiwa; Bagusa; Yarsun; Bapu; Bonerif; Lairawa; Kauweraweo; Mander; Papasena; Wakde; Baso; Bonggo; Itik; Keder; Maremgi; Podena; Marembori; Babe; Kabera; Kwerba; Masimasi; Samarokena; Wares; Berik; Dabra; Kwesten; Massep; Sobei; Warotai; Betaf; Foau; Kapitiauw; Liki; Nopuk |
| Keerom Regency | Awibyakwa; Awyi; Dera; Dubu; Emem; Fermanggem; Janggu; Taikat; Yafi; Manem; Sowei; Molof; Usku; Emumu; Sangke; Waina; Senggi; Waris; Walsa; Yetfa |
| Biak Numfor Regency | Borapasi; Bonefa; Kofei; Sauri; Siromi; Tafaro; Waropen; Wairata; Burate; Sedasi; Otodema; Demisa; Demba; Biak |
| Waropen Regency | Amabi; Ansus; Busami; Karema; Kurudu; Marau; Munggui; Nisa; Papuma; Pom; Arui; Woi; Anate; Nakabui; Waropen |
| Yapen Islands Regency | Borapasi; Bonefa; Kofei; Kurudu; Kaipuri; Sauri; Siromi; Tafaro; Waropen; Wairata; Burate; Sedasi; Otodema; Demisa; Demba |
| Mamberamo Raya Regency | Bauzi; Duvle; Tauraf |

=== Highland Papua ===
Papuan ethnic groups/tribes in the Indonesian province of Highland Papua include:

| Jayawijaya Regency | Nduga; Walak; Dani (Hugula · Hubula · Huwula/Huwulra · Hubla) |
| Nduga Regency | Nduga |
| Yalimo Regency | Yali (Apahapsili · Abenaho · Gilika) |
| Pegunungan Bintang Regency | Arintap; Biksi; Eipomek; Mek; Ngalum; Ketengban; Yetfa; Lepki; Murop; Kimki; Pyu; Una |
| Tolikara Regency | Taori; Kwerisa; Toarikei; Turu; Lani |
| Yahukimo Regency | Yali (Yalimek/Inlom · Angguruk · Ninia); Hupla (Soba); Kimyal (Korupun-Sela); Momuna (Samboga · Intamaja); Una; Mek (Nalca/Hmanggona · Nipsan · Kosarek); Ngalik (Silimo); Obini; Korowai (Arubkor · Klufo); Obukain (Diuwe); Kopkaka (Seredala · Kwer · Tokuni/Dajub · Burumakok); Awban (Bese) |

=== Central Papua ===
Papuan ethnic groups/tribes in the Indonesian province of Central Papua include:

| Deiyai Regency | Mee; Kamoro |
| Dogiyai Regency | Mee |
| Intan Jaya Regency | Dao (Auye); Moni; Wolani; Nduga |
| Mimika Regency | Kamoro; Sempan; Damal; Amungme |
| Nabire Regency | Yerisiam Gua; Wate; Mora; Yaur; Umari; Mee; Napan (Auye) |
| Paniai Regency | Dao (Auye); Mee; Moni; Wolani |
| Puncak Regency | Amungme; Dou (Edopi); Damal; Dani Atas; Dem; Fayu; Nduga; Kirikiri; Lani; Tause; Turu; Wano |
| Puncak Jaya Regency | Dani Atas; Dem; Duvle; Lani; Nduga; Turu; Wano |

=== South Papua ===
Papuan ethnic groups/tribes in the Indonesian province of South Papua include:

| Merauke Regency | Bian Marind; Kanum; Kimaam; Maklew; Marind Dek (Hulu); Marind Laut (Muara); Mombum; Marori; Yab (Yelmek); Yei |
| Asmat Regency | Asmat; Citak; Pisa; Sawi; Tamnim (Citak); Warkai; Biplim |
| Mappi Regency | Airo-Sumaghaghe; Awyu; Kayagar; Muyu; Siagha; Tamagario; Yaghai; Yenimu |
| Boven Digoel Regency | Aghu; Iwur (Murop); Muyu (Are · Kakaib · Kamindip · Kasaut · Kawiyet · Ningrum · Okpari · Yonggom); Kauwol; Kombai; Korowai; Kotogut; Wambon (Mandobo); Wanggom; Yair |

== Languages ==
=== Native/indigenous (Papuan languages) ===
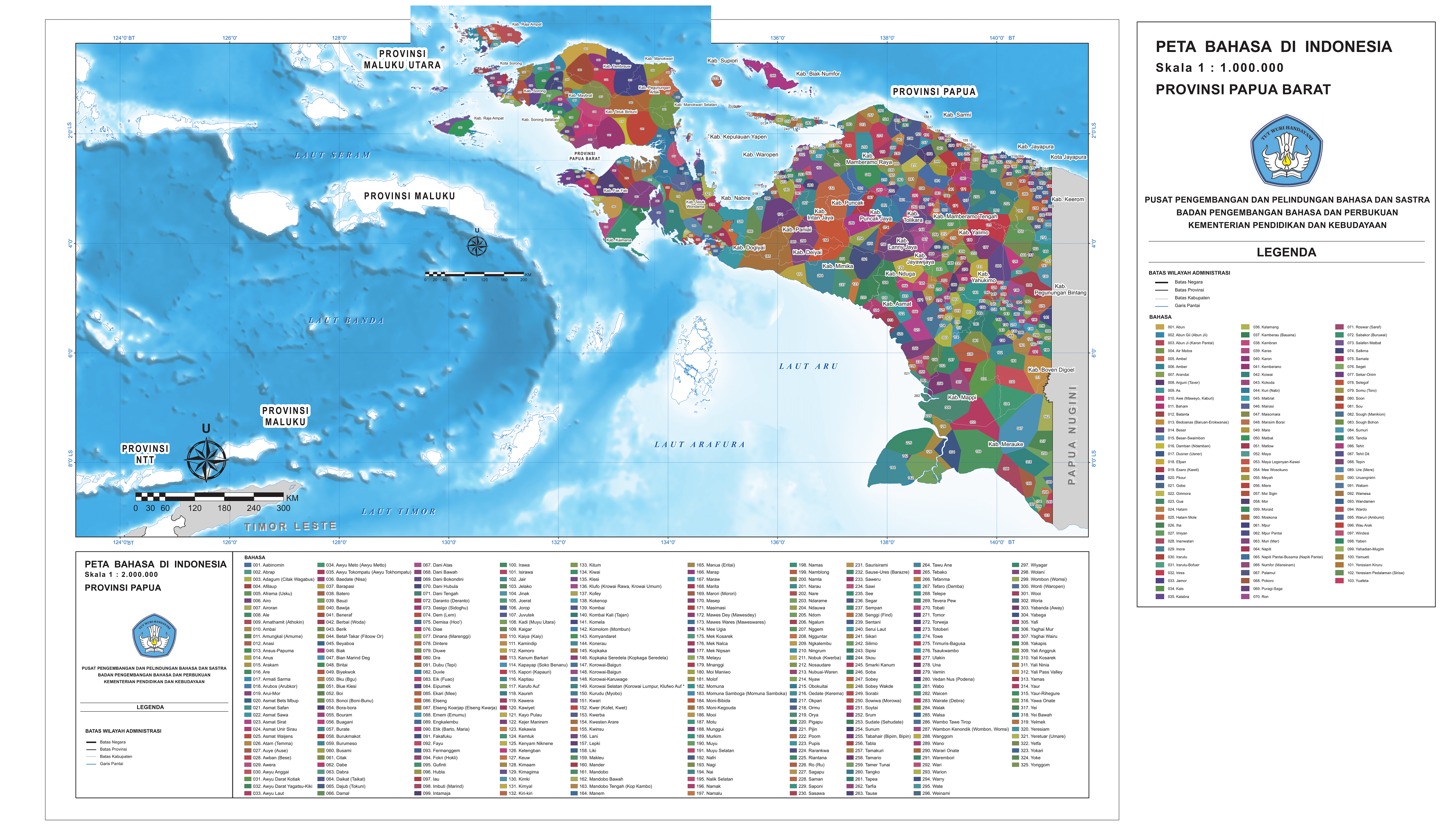
The official Agency for Language Development and Cultivation linguistic map of 325 native Papuan languages in Papua (Indonesia) alone (not including other Papuan languages beyond Papua in Eastern Indonesia as a whole).

According to the official Indonesian national linguistic data, there are at least 428 living Papuan languages (and 37 Papua-based isolate languages) natively spoken by the Papuans, making it the most linguistically diverse community in Indonesia. According to one estimate by Yohana Yembise in 2013, among the 250 languages in the then Papua Province, 54 languages belong to Austronesian language family. Papuan languages are also spoken outside of New Guinea such as the Timor–Alor–Pantar speakers in Timor, Alor, and Pantar, as well as North Halmahera in Maluku Islands.

=== Non-native (non-Papuan languages) ===
In addition to their own native Papuan languages, the Papuans (especially the Coastal Papuans) also speak another languages belonging to non-Papuan linguistic family. As part of the Indonesian nationals, the Papuans also speak Indonesian, it is an official and national language of Indonesia, which also spoken by their fellow Papuans in Papua New Guinea, especially in the border areas.

== Cultures and traditions ==
=== Carving ===
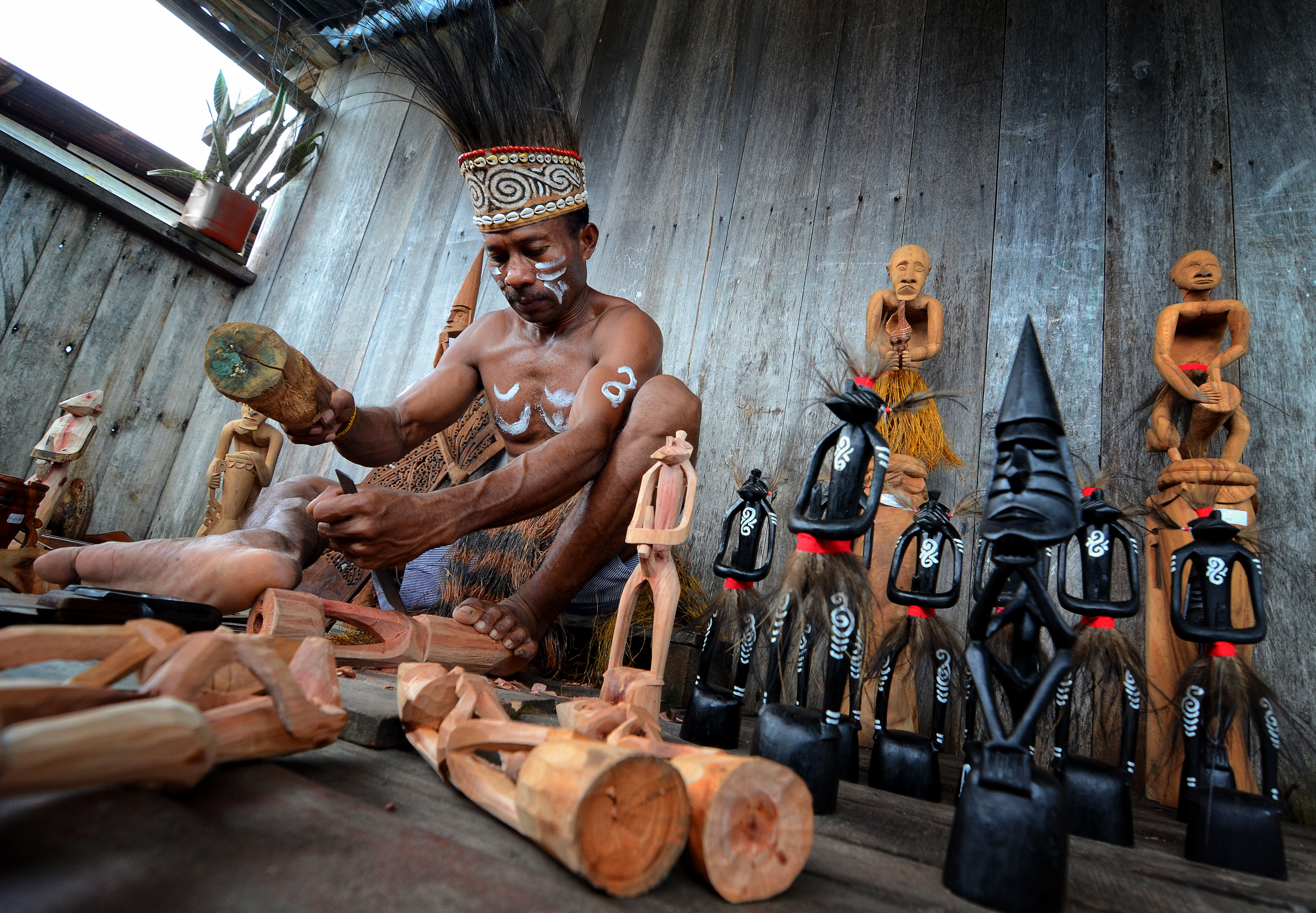
Asmat sculptor in Indonesia

Carving (especially wood carving) in Indonesian Papuan culture is not merely decorative—it embodies a deep connection to the spirit world, tradition, and community identity. It is a significant artistic and cultural tradition among many Indigenous Papuan communities in Indonesia, especially in regions like Asmat, Kamoro, and Sentani. These carvings are deeply symbolic and often tied to spiritual beliefs, ancestral worship, and daily life.

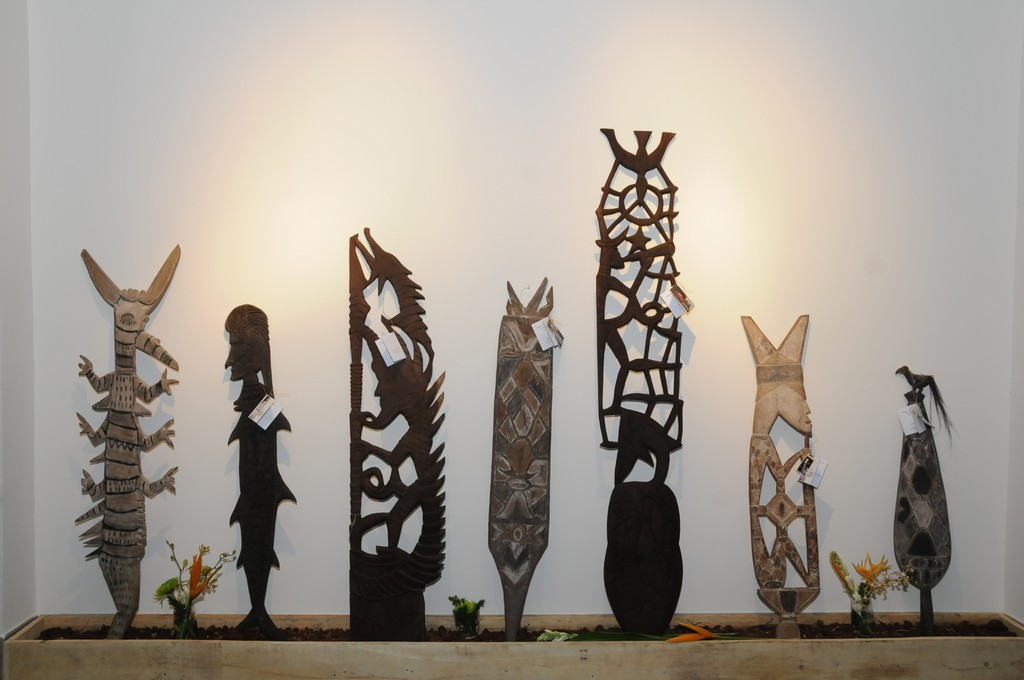
Showcase of Mimika (Kamoro) wood carvings

Among the Asmat Papuans, for example, wood carving is highly developed and serves ritual purposes. They create bis poles, tall carved wooden poles made to honor ancestors and used in funerary ceremonies. The carvings typically depict human figures, animals, and mythological symbols representing strength, protection, and spiritual connection. Meanwhile, Sentani artists are famous for carving motifs into wooden bark paintings and household items, often featuring spiral patterns and stylized figures.

=== Mummification ===
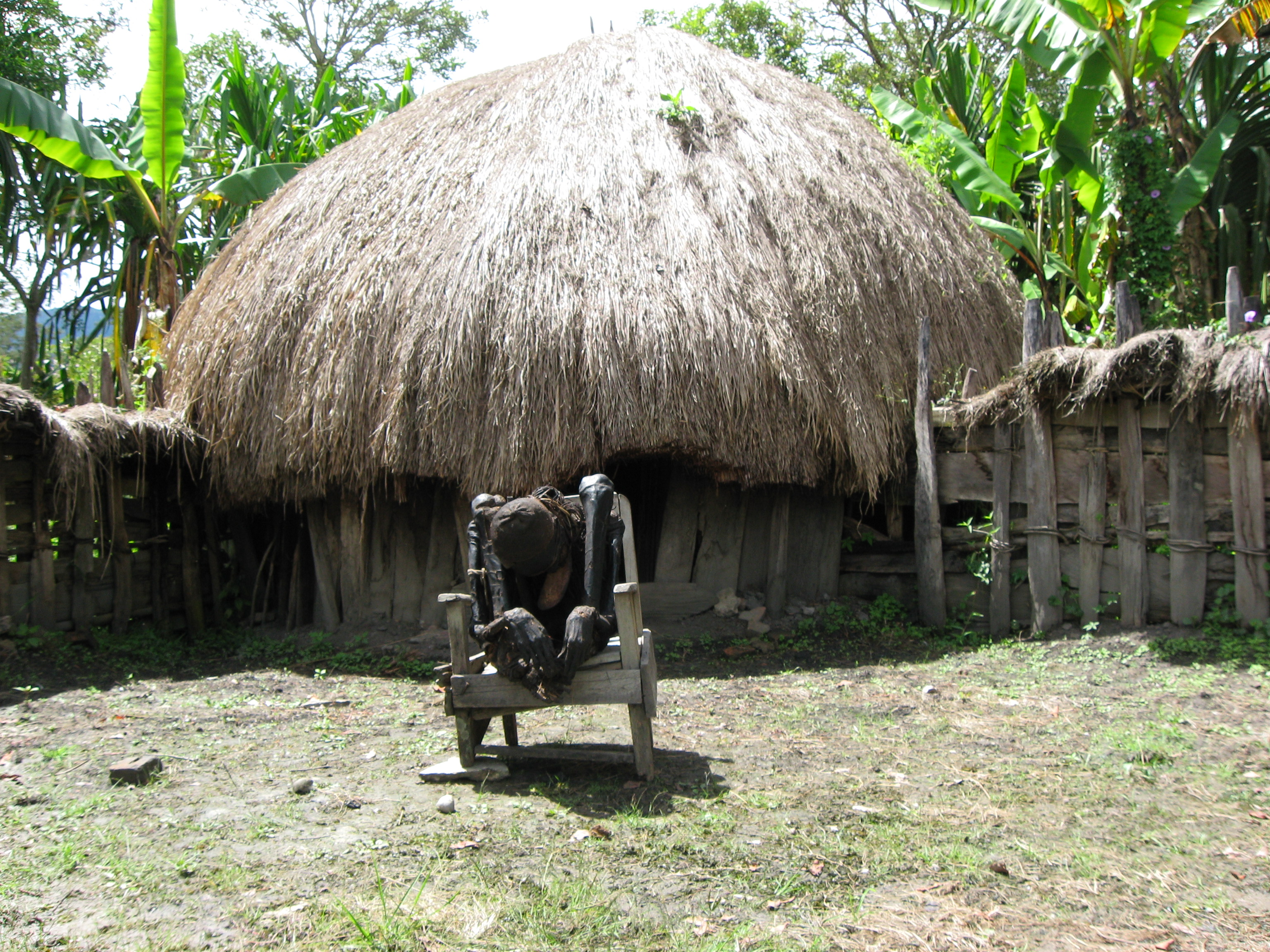
Mummy of Weropak Elosak

In some highland communities, such as the Dani tribespeople in the Baliem Valley, mummification called akonipuk is a traditional practice used to honor and preserve the bodies of important tribal leaders or warriors. The process involves smoking the corpse over a fire for weeks to dry and preserve it, often in a sitting position. These mummies are then kept in special huts and are considered sacred, symbolizing ancestral strength and leadership. This tradition is now rare and mostly preserved as cultural heritage. Similar mummification traditions are practiced by the Mee, the Moni, the Lani, the Eipo, among others.

=== Noken ===
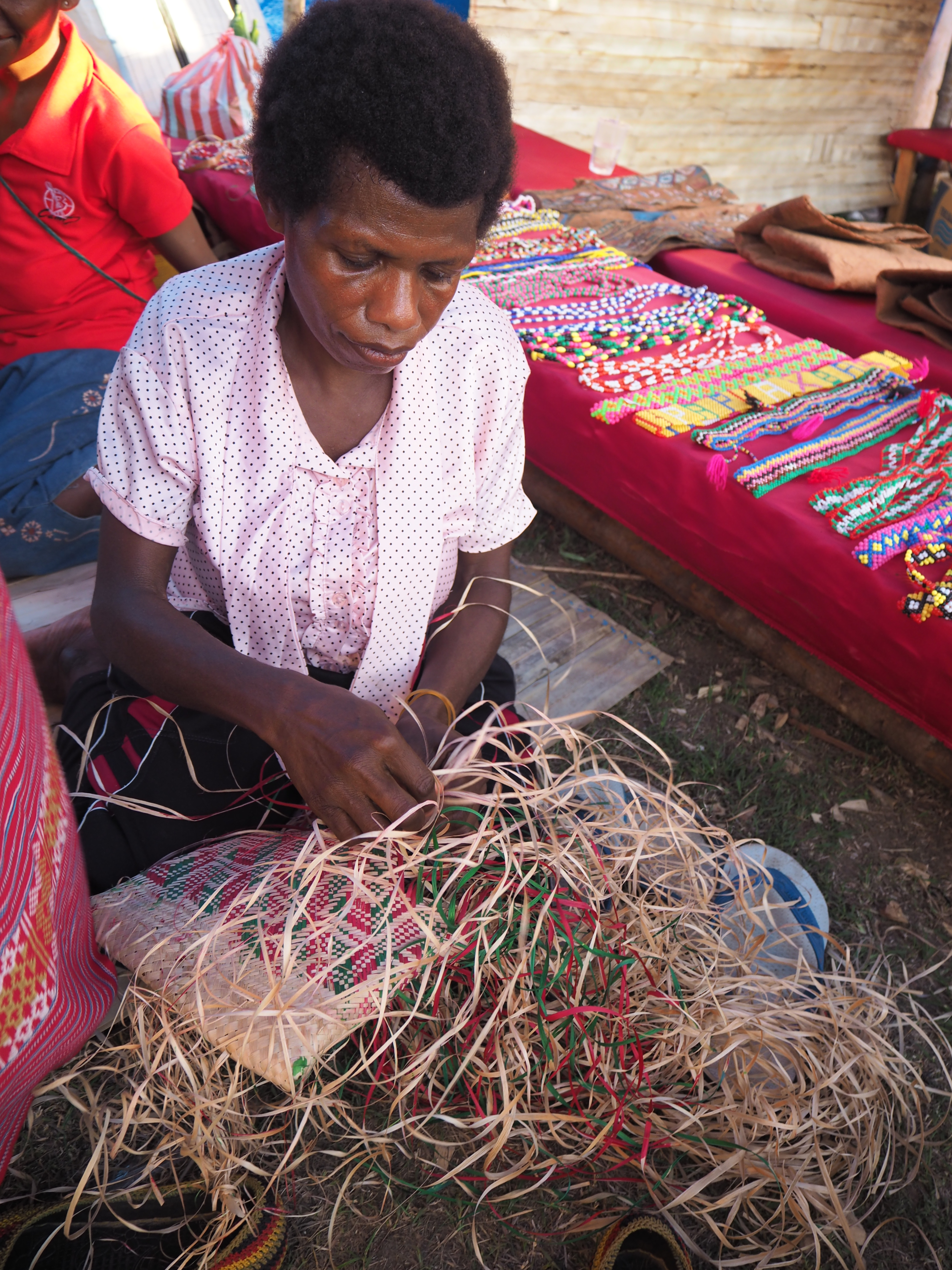
Woven noken made from Pandan leaves, common in coastal areas

Noken, the traditional knitted or woven bag, an invention of the Indonesian Papuan people, is internationally inscribed as the Intangible Cultural Heritage of Humanity by the United Nations Educational, Scientific and Cultural Organization (UNESCO) since 2012.

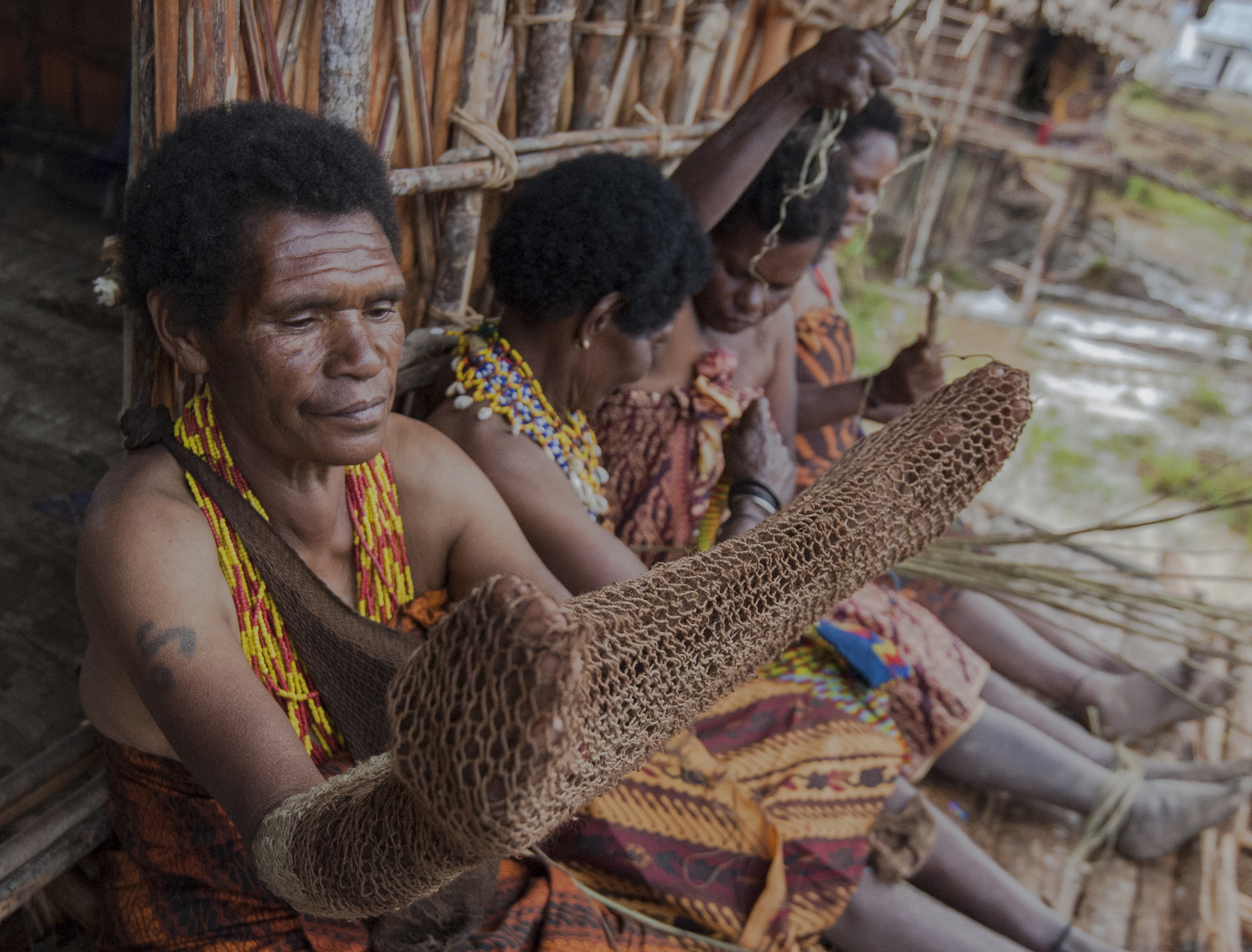
Knitted noken made from Melinjo bark, common in highland areas

It is also inspired the Noken system, a unique electoral method used in Indonesia. Instead of individual voting, community leaders (Papuan tribal chiefs) vote on behalf of their people, often through consensus or traditional customs. This system respects local indigenous Papuan traditions and emphasizes communal decision-making rather than individual ballots. This system also known colloquially as 'Papuan hanging bag system' (named after the hanging Noken).

== Discrimination, torture and human rights violations ==
In 2005, the New York Times had reported Freeport had given Indonesian Police and Military likely over $20 million. Their agreement over Grasberg mine, a contract that took place just a couple years before the Act of "Free Choice" and with Papuans having no say in the contract, also entailed a clause allowing them to remove and displace any [indigenous] people living near and around this gold and minerals deposit, likely why they pay and supply police and military, even as far as allowing them to use company helicopters.

Freeport's play in the ethnic cleansing and massacres (such as the East Timor genocide) of the area gets worse with the documented human rights abuses of the following: Torture, rape, indiscriminate and extrajudicial killings, disappearances, arbitrary detention, surveillance and intimidation, restrictions on freedom of movement, violation of subsistence and livelihood rights from seizure of thousands of acres of Rainforest of which were community hunting grounds and contamination of fishing grounds and water supplies, Violation of Cultural rights through destruction of a sacred mountain and other spiritually significant sites, forced resettlement of communities, destruction of churches, houses and other shelters, and possibly much more. For more information: https://www.laohamutuk.org/Oil/LNG/Refs/002AbrashFreeport.pdf.

=== Operation Clean Sweep ===
In 1981, the Indonesian army ran operation clean sweep with the motto "let the rats [Papuans] run into the jungle so that the chickens can breed in the coop", the Papuans saw their villages torched, men executed, women raped and "settlers" moved in to replace them on their own land.

When a village would be bombed or set alight Papuan refugees would hide in churches and clinics which were then also set alight. Those that escaped into the rainforest would likely die of starvation or disease. The Indonesian army also used Freeport's shipping containers as prisons for Papuans, where dozens were sealed in total darkness for months in the middle of the mining site. The Asian Human Rights Commission reported that some Papuans were buried alive. The death toll of this violence is unknown but some estimates have it as over 100,000 Papuan lives.

=== Gome torture scandal ===
In 2024 videos of a Papuan, Defianus Kogoya (19), placed in a drum barrel of water with his arms tied behind his back as he was brutally tortured by Indonesian soldiers, the soldiers began to beat him and then stab and slash at his back with a bayonet, whilst shouting racial slurs at him. Another whilst being taken to a police station the other Papuan, Warnius Kogoya (18), had allegedly jumped out of the vehicle and hit his head, however witnesses state that he was tied to the back of the car and dragged for a kilometre and then tortured to death by Indonesian soldiers. The military responded to the outrage saying that the men were OPM but later had to release Defianus and Alianus due to a lack of evidence but they weren't adequately treated for their injuries. And these are only some cases of this violence against the Papuan people, there are, of course, many other instances, such as innocent pregnant women and children being shot down with machine guns.

== In popular culture ==
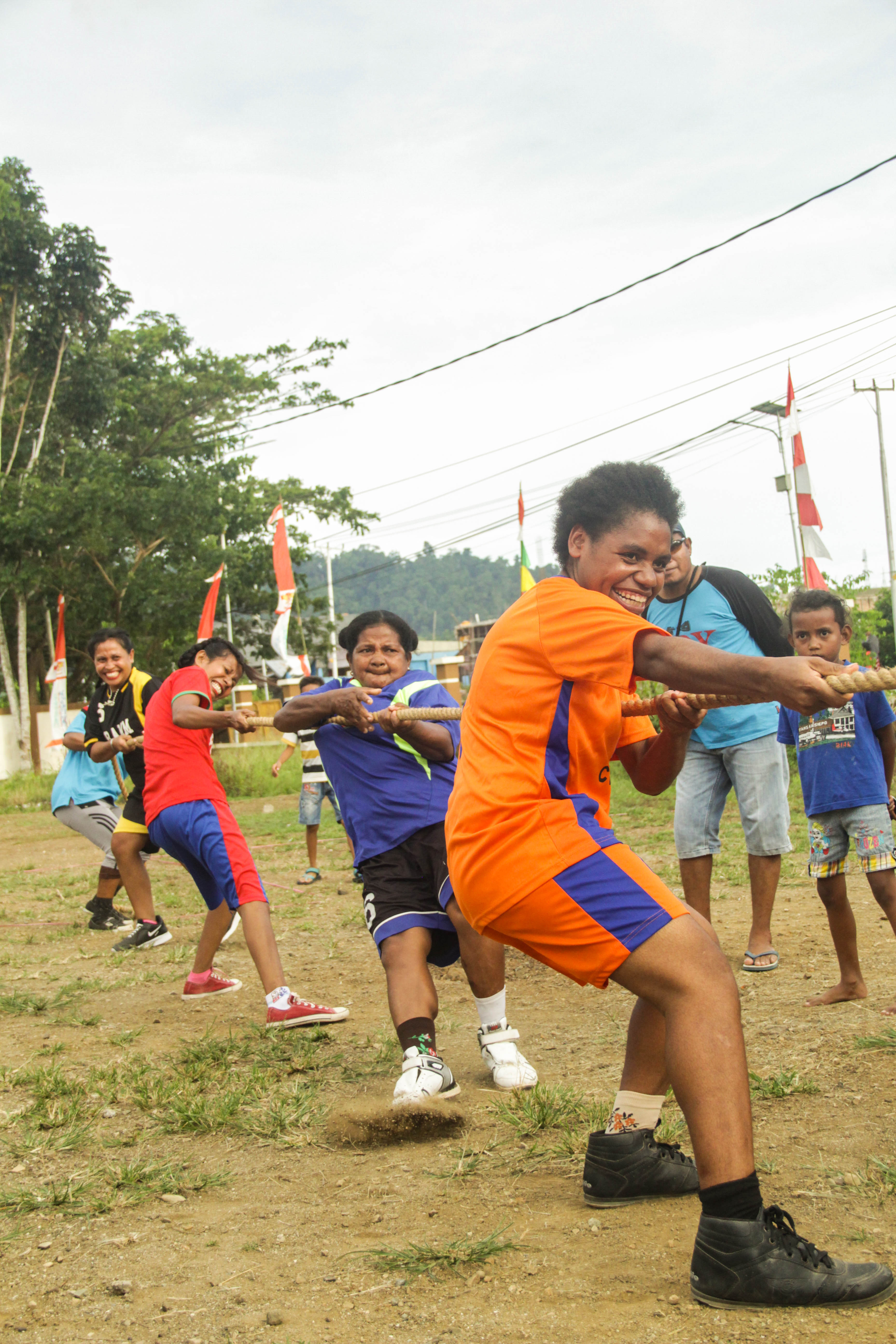
Indonesian Papuan youth in a tarik tambang (lit. 'rope pulling') competition, during Indonesian Independence Day celebrations

Indonesian Papuans have gained increasing recognition in popular culture (nationwide in Indonesia and internationally), particularly in the movie and music industries. In Indonesian cinema, Papuan actors have been cast in leading roles, portraying authentic stories from their communities and highlighting the region's unique cultural identity. In the music scene, Papuan artists have also emerged in mainstream competitions and platforms, showcasing powerful vocals and distinct musical styles rooted in their heritage. This growing representation reflects a broader movement toward inclusion and appreciation of Papua's contributions to Indonesia's cultural diversity.

=== Movies ===
- Denias, Senandung di Atas Awan (2006) (lit. 'Denias, the Hum Above the Clouds')
- Tanah Mama (2015) (lit. 'the Land of Mother')
- Si Tikam Polisi Noken (2022) (lit. 'Si Tikam, the Noken Policeman')
- Zabur (Bukan) Nabi (2023) (lit. 'Psalm (Not) the Prophet')

== Notable people ==
=== A ===
- Abdul Hakim Achmad Aituarauw, member of Indonesian People's Representative Council

=== B ===
- Boaz Solossa, Indonesian footballer

=== E ===
- Elie Aiboy, former Indonesian footballer

=== F ===
- Frans Kaisiepo, fourth Governor of Papua and National Hero of Indonesia
- Freddy Numberi, Indonesian politician and former Minister of Transportation

=== M ===
- Machmud Singgirei Rumagesan, King of Sekar and National Hero of Indonesia
- Marlina Flassy, Indonesian anthropologist and the first woman to be appointed Dean of Cenderawasih University

=== N ===
- Nitya Krishinda Maheswari, Indonesian badminton player and 2014 Asian Games women's doubles gold medalist
- Nowela Auparay, professional singer and Indonesian Idol winner

=== R ===
- Raema Lisa Rumbewas, Indonesian weightlifter and silver medallist at the 2000 and 2004 Summer Olympics
- Ricky Kambuaya, Indonesian footballer

=== S ===
- Saiful Islam Al-Payage, Indonesian Islamic preacher

=== T ===
- Titus Bonai, Indonesian footballer
- Elie Aiboy, former Indonesian footballer
- Marlina Flassy, Indonesian anthropologist and the first woman to be appointed Dean of Cenderawasih University
- Frans Kaisiepo, 4th Governor of Papua and National Hero of Indonesia
- Nitya Krishinda Maheswari, Indonesian badminton player and 2014 Asian Games women's doubles gold medalist
- Nowela Auparay, professional singer and Indonesian Idol winner
- Freddy Numberi, Indonesian politician and former Minister of Transportation
- Raema Lisa Rumbewas, Indonesian weightlifter and silver medallist at the 2000 and 2004 Summer Olympics
- Boaz Solossa, Indonesian footballer
- Titus Bonai, Indonesian footballer
- Ricky Kambuaya, Indonesian footballer
- Benny Wenda, West Papuan independence leader
- Machmud Singgirei Rumagesan, King of Sekar and National Hero of Indonesia
- Abdul Hakim Achmad Aituarauw, Member of People's Representative Council
- Ricky Kayame, Indonesian footballer
- Ibrahim Kosepa, Indonesian footballer
- Lukas Rumkorem, fighter for the liberation of West Irian or integration into Indonesia

== See also ==
- Aboriginal Australians
- Indigenous peoples of New Guinea
- Melanesians
- Oceanians
