= Maybrat =

Maybrat may refer to the following topics from Southwest Papua, Indonesia:

- Maybrat language
- Maybrat people
- Maybrat Regency
