= Greemakolo =

- Village
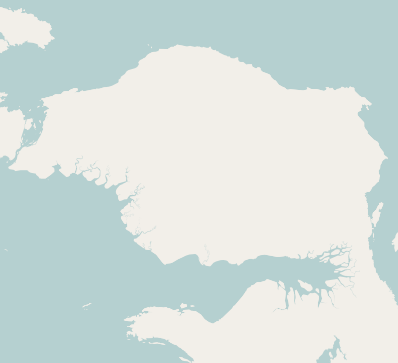
- Location of the town in the Bird's Head Peninsula
- Coordinates: 1°14′0″S 132°10′0″E
- Country: Indonesia
- Province: Southwest Papua
- Regency: Sorong Regency
- Time zone: UTC+7 (WIB)

Greemakolo is a village in Southwest Papua, Indonesia. The village is located in the southwestern-central part of the Bird's Head Peninsula, northeast of Teminabuan. A dirt road connects it to Rawas in the northeast. The village is also close to a group of lakes called the Ayamaru Lakes.
