= 2006 Abepura incident =

- Part of the Papua conflict
- Date: 16–17 March 2006
- Location: Abepura, Jayapura, Papua
- Caused by: Grasberg mine
- Methods: Traffic obstruction, rioting

Parties
Papuan students	Indonesia: Indonesian National Armed Forces; Indonesian Army; Indonesian Police; Mobile Brigade Corps

Casualties and losses
23 arrested	4 dead
- 28 injured. 1 Indonesian policeman died later of his wounds. 1 Papuan student died in custody.

The 2006 Abepura incident was a clash between Papuan student protesters and Indonesian policemen and soldiers in the district of Abepura, Jayapura of Papua on 16 March 2006. The clashes killed four policemen and a soldier, and further injured tens of protesters.

== Protests ==
On 16 March 2006, students from Cenderawasih University protested the Grasberg mine in Abepura, Jayapura, where they blocked the road to the airport and refused talks with representatives of local authorities and did not disperse when ordered by police. After a standoff, the police's Mobile Brigade Corps (Brimob) opted to disperse the crowd with tear gas, and after some time the protests turned into a clash with the police employing firearms and the protesters throwing rocks and bottles at them. Three Brimob officers were killed in the clashes alongside one Indonesian Air Force Sergeant, with another police officer succumbing to his wounds the following week. In total, twenty five were treated for injuries, and at least five had been shot.

== Arrests ==
The day after the incident, multiple Brimob officers fired their weapons towards the sky in front of Abepura's military base, injuring three civilians. Raids were launched against the student dormitories, with 23 people arrested for the attacks, of which 20 were prosecuted. Of the arrested suspects, one died in custody due to physical abuse.

== Aftermath ==
Some protesters later reportedly crossed over to Papua New Guinea in order to evade capture. Australian Senator Natasha Stott Despoja claimed, citing activists, that 16 corpses had been discovered close to the scene of the rioting, though this claim was rebuked by an Indonesian local human rights organization.
