= Ayamaru Lakes =

Lakes in Southwest Papua, Indonesia

- Location within Western New Guinea Location within Indonesia
- Location: Ayamaru District, Maybrat Regency, Southwest Papua
- Coordinates: 1°16′S 132°12′E
- Primary inflows: Framu River
- Primary outflows: Ayamaru River
- Basin countries: Indonesia
- Average depth: 30 ft (9.1 m)
- Max. depth: 40 ft (12 m)
- Surface elevation: 180 ft (55 m)
- Islands: Kaymundan Island
- Settlements: Greemakolo, Rawas

The Ayamaru Lakes (sometimes spelled Ajamaru) are a group of lakes found in the west-central part of the Bird's Head Peninsula in Southwest Papua, Indonesia. The nearest village to the group is Greemakolo. The many villages around the Ayamaru Lakes speak the Ayamaru language, a dialect of the Maybrat language.

== Etymology ==
The word Ayamaru comes from a combination of the words; Aya, which means water, and Maru, which means lake. People living around the lakes are called Ra ro Maru (lake people) or Ayamaru people, a sub-tribe of the Maybrat people.

== Physical features ==
The group consist of Lake Ayamaru (actually three lakes) and Lake Hain (actually two lakes) Many low hills surround the lakes. The water in both lakes is a clear blue because of the rich material in the water. There are deep holes in the lakes that lead to underwater caverns. The vivid colors on the north shores of the Ayamaru Lakes are the result of pigmented bacteria in the microbial mats that grow around the edges of the mineral-rich water. The bacteria produce colors ranging from orange to red; the amount of color in the microbial mats depends on the ratio of chlorophyll to carotenoids and on the temperature of the water, which favors one bacterium over another. The pH in the lake exceeds t 8.0.

== Lake Ayamaru ==
The largest lake in the group, Lake Ayamaru, has a warmer temperature than Lake Hatlin. In the center of the lake is Kaymundan Island, a small island covered with trees. Lake Ayamaru comprises three smaller lakes called Jow, Semitu, and Yate. Being the largest, Lake Jow is about 7 km (4.3 mi) in length and 2 km (1.2 mi) in width, Lake Semitu is about 2 km (1.2 mi) in length and 1.5 km (0.93 mi) in width, while Lake Yate is about 3 km (1.9 mi) in length and less than 1.5 km (0.93 mi) in width. On the northwestern shore of the lake is the village of Greemakolo. The lake is a bit foggy because of the temperatures up to 71 °F (22 °C). This is also where the Ayamaru River starts. The people from the surrounding villages use the lake for fishing and bathing.

== Lake Hain ==
Lake Hain comprises two lakes with temperatures up to 100 °F (38 °C). This is where the Framu River flows in. Most of the lake is covered with mist because of its high temperatures. It is a hot spring.

== Wildlife ==
Most of the wildlife is found in the wetlands along the southern shores of Lake Ayamura. There are four endemic fishes in the lakes, the Ajamaru Lakes rainbowfish (Melanotaenia ajamaruensis), Boeseman's rainbowfish (Melanotaenia boesemani), Vogelkop blue-eye (Pseudomugil reticulatus) and Hoese's goby (Glossogobius hoesei). Non-endemic natives include the shortfin tandan (Neosilurus brevidorsalis) and fimbriate gudgeon (Oxyeleotris fimbriata), while several other fish species have been introduced by humans.

Additionally, the Parastacid crayfish Cherax boesemani is endemic to the lakes.

== See also ==
- List of drainage basins of Indonesia
