= Ayamaru people =

Ethnic group in Indonesia

Ayamaru
Ra ro Maru
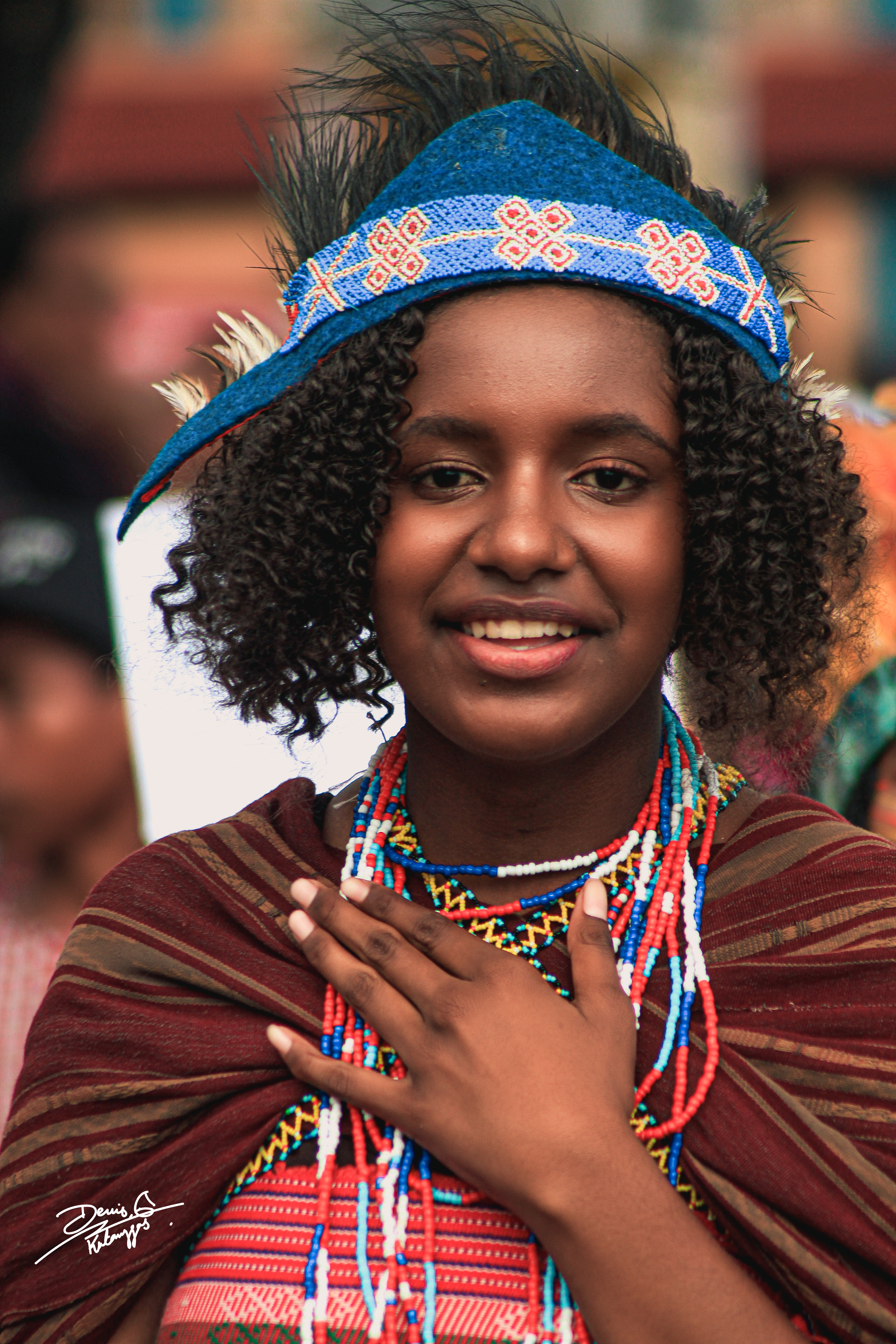
- Ayamaru woman wearing traditional attire made from Timor cloth

Total population
- 25,000

Regions with significant populations
- Indonesia (Southwest Papua)

Languages
- Ayamaru

Religion
- Christianity; Folk religion

Related ethnic groups
- Maybrat (Karon • Mare • Aifat • Aitinyo • Wayer)

The Ayamaru people (Mai Brat: Ra ro Maru) are an ethnic group inhabiting the western and southern regions around Ayamaru Lakes, Southwest Papua, Indonesia. Their population is approximately 25,000 people spread across about forty villages. They speak Ayamaru, a member of the Maybrat language family, making this group one of the sub-Maybrat people. The word aya means water, maru means lake, mei means language, and brat means people.

The Ayamaru traditionally live by gardening and hunting fish and wild animals around Ayamaru Lake. Game such as bird-of-paradise is often traded with textiles brought by other ethnic groups. Their primary kinship unit is the nuclear family, where newlyweds establish their own residence. Kinship is bilateral. Today, many Ayamaru people adhere to Christianity.

== History ==
In the 1920s to 1930s, a person from the Ayamaru region was appointed as a vassal king by representatives of the Tidore Sultanate, namely Flebroe Solossa as King Framu (Ayamaru). The coronation took place in the village of Wersar, near the Kaibus River (now Teminabuan), where he and a number of other vassal kings were given medals, a scepter, and a songkok. The coronation letter was written in Malay and Dutch.
