= Hoese's goby =

Conservation status
- Endangered (IUCN 3.1)

Scientific classification
- Kingdom: Animalia
- Phylum: Chordata
- Class: Actinopterygii
- Order: Gobiiformes
- Family: Gobiidae
- Genus: Glossogobius
- Species: G. hoesei

Binomial name
- Glossogobius hoesei G. R. Allen & Boeseman, 1982

Species of fish

Glossogobius hoesei, Hoese's goby, is a species of goby endemic to the Ayamaru Lakes in West Papua, Indonesia where it can be found on muddy or gravel substrates as well as in small tributary streams. This species can reach a length of 7 centimetres (2.8 in) SL. The specific name honours the ichthyologist Douglass Fielding Hoese of the Australian Museum in Sydney who has made an important contribution to the study of fishes in the order Gobiiformes.
