= Marlina Flassy =

Papuan anthropologist

- Born: 1968 (age 57–58); Teminabuan, Southwest Papua, Indonesia
- Citizenship: Indonesia
- Occupation: Anthropologist
- Known for: Dean of the Faculty of Social and Political Sciences
- Awards: Golden Pin Award (2015)

Academic background
- Education: Cenderawasih University; Gadjah Mada University; University of Gottingen
- Thesis: Local Knowledge, Disease and Healing in a Papua Community (2015)
- Doctoral advisor: Brigitta Hauser-Schäublin; Michael Mühlenberg

Academic work
- Discipline: Anthropology
- Sub-discipline: Women's studies
- Institutions: Cenderawasih University

Marlina Flassy (born 1968) is an Indonesian Papuan anthropologist, who is the first woman to hold a deanship at Cenderawasih University, and is the first woman and indigenous Papuan to be appointed Dean of the Faculty of Social and Political Sciences there. In 2015 the Indonesian Ministry of Research and Technology awarded her its Golden Pin Award.

== Early life and education ==
Flassy was born on 15 March 1968 in Seribau, near Teminabuan, South Sorong Regency, West Irian (currently the province of Southwest Papua).

She attended YPK Kotaraja Junior High School and then FX Taruna Dharma Kotaraja Catholic High School. She studied for an undergraduate degree in anthropology at Cenderawasih University in Jayapura, graduating in 1995. In 1996, she began work as a lecturer at the same university teaching anthropology, ethnography, folklore, amongst other subjects. She subsequently studied for her master's degree at Gadjah Mada University in Yogyakarta, graduating in 2002.

She studied for her PhD at the University of Gottingen in Germany, graduating in 2015.

== Career and research ==
In 2021, she was appointed Dean of the Faculty of Social and Political Sciences; she is the first woman and the first indigenous Papuan to hold the role. She is also the first woman to hold any deanship at Cenderawasih University. She had previously held the role of Chair of the Department of Anthropology. In 2019, she was appointed Chair of the Cenderawasih University’s Center for Gender and Child Studies (PGSA). Flassy has written several academic works on subjects such as women in West Papua, the Mooi people, the Napan-Wainame people, the Maybrat community and gender and health equality in West Papua.

She collaborated with the Indonesian Minister of Women’s Empowerment and Child Protection to produce a research report entitled the ‘Profile of women and children in Papua Province’. One example of the research was to reveal that in 2017, there were 98 reported cases of violence against women and children, a figure that did not reflect women in Papua's lived experience.

She is editor of the journal Jurnal Antropologi Papua.

In 2015, the Indonesian Ministry of Research and Technology awarded her its Golden Pin Award, marking her contributions to women's rights and anthropology.

== Awards ==
- Golden Pin Award [Penghargaan Peniti Emas] (2015)
- Young Community Care Researcher (2004)
- Achievement Image of Papuan Women’s Charisma (2004)

== Selected publications ==
- Sapioper, H., Flassy, M., & Ilham, I. (30 April 2021). Kualitas Pelayanan Sertifikat Tanah Hak Milik di Kantor Pertanahan Kabupaten Jayapura. Jurnal Borneo Administrator, 17(1), 89-110.
- Flassy, Marlina. "Membangun Jati Diri Suku Tehit Kabupaten Sorong Selatan Papua Barat." CENDERAWASIH: Jurnal Antropologi Papua 1.1 (2020): 1-7.
- Flassy, Marlina. "Deficit of Woman Human Right in Papua Province." Humanities and Social Science Research 2.2 (2019).
- Greifeld, Katarina, D. W. J. H. van Oosterhout, and Marlina Flassy. "Women and Child Health and Malaria in Papua (Keerom and Merauke). A Qualitative Study (KAP)." Bulletin of Health Studies 34.2 (2006): 46-46.
- FLASSY, Marlina. Perubahan sistem perkawinan pada suku bangsa Meybrat di Sorong tanah Papua dalam perspektif gender. Diss. Universitas Gadjah Mada, 2002.
