= Tehit people =

Ethnic group from Southwest Papua, Indonesia

Tehit
Total population
- 15,972 (2010)

Regions with significant populations
- South Sorong Regency

Languages
- Tehit, Indonesia, Papuan Malay

Religion
- Christianity (majority); Islam dan Indigenous beliefs (minority)

Related ethnic groups
- Maybrat • Moi • Inanwatan

Tehit people are an ethnic group who live in the southern part of Doberai Peninsula. Their traditional settlements are concentrated around the Teminabuan District. According to the 2010 Indonesian census, Tehit people population were 15,972.

== Etymology ==
The names "Tehit" or "Tehid" derives from the word tahiyid, which means 'they are tehid'. However, the lexical meaning has lost.

== History ==
According to history, Tehit people came from the Toror culture region encompassing the Seget–Sele Peninsula. A natural disaster of a major tidal surge prompted Toror culture people to seek refuge and settle in an area known today as Teminabuan. Tehit people who migrated to Teminabuan by boat were Kondologit, Kondjol, Sarwanik, Kemesrar, Salamuk, Bless, Blesia, Bleskadit, Sremere, Kremak, Momoth, Adjolo, Sfahrit, Kdamaa, and Salambauw clans. These migrating groups later introduced stone axes and pottery to the residents who had lived in Teminabuan. They probably came to Teminabuan several hundred years ago and pushed out the Papuan pygmy tribe, Salfedrar, who had dwelled in the area earlier. Tehit people are tall and sturdy, like typical Papuans living in swampy coast areas.

Tehit's traditional stories stated that some of them originated from kefi, a tree that they considered to be regal. The story told that the Frisa clan, which currently lives in Wenselalo, split kefi. After being split, humans emerged from it. The splitting was based on the instruction of a female dog whose name was unknown. The clans that are from kefi trees are Sagisallo, Sera, Selaya, Seflembolo, Sagrim, Sarefe, Sabru, Sakamak, Thesia, Sreflo, Sawen, dan Yarollo. Furthermore, there are other clans originating from soil, cassowary, sky, and river, such as Simat, Flassy, Kamesrar, Suahan, and others. From these traditional stories, there was a blend of culture, language, and custom processes. Then, intermarriage occurred between them, creating Tehit people.

Tehit has been influenced by several eras. During the Sultanate of Tidore era, Tehit people were led by small kingdoms that resided in four weris (territories or settlements), which were Weri Ambuam (Teminabuan), Weri Sar, Weri Konda, dan Weri Kasrer (Siribau). The King of Kaibus in Teminabuan was the most dominant of the others, with the title of Raja Kaibus and Angguok Kondjol as the first king. Trade relationships were established between these territories and kingdoms in the Onin Peninsula, such as Fatagar and Arguni, and in Raja Ampat Islands, i.e., Salawati. They traded lesser bird-of-paradise and slaves in exchange for clothes, axes, machetes, knives, and others.

In the 1940s, European missionaries (zending) began spreading Christianity among the Tehit people. Many of the missionaries were sent from the Maluku Islands to Teminabuan. King of Kaibus, Angguok, played an important role in facilitating the spread of Christianity. The introduction of this 'foreign' religion led the Tehit people to abandon their traditional culture and accept modernization through the church. In 1941, during World War II, all the priests, missionaries, and locals fled into the interior.

During the Japanese occupation, Tehit people were forced to build Teminabuan–Ayamaru highway with limited equipment. Due to the Japanese tyranny towards the locals, there was resistance against them. Through cooperation between the Allied forces and Teminabuan residents, Japanese forces were finally expelled from Teminabuan. Afterwards, the Dutch drilled oil in Sorong. The Tehit society began to rebuild itself in the fields of government, church, socio-economics, society, and culture. During this period, the Tehit people usually formed a unity consisting of two parts: the Coastal Tehit and the Mountain Tehit.

Tehit society consists of several patrilineal clans. Clan members are called wendla, and their leaders are referred as nakhohokh. Leadership is commonly seen in societal issues such as inheritance distribution problems, marriage regulation, and customary violations. Nakhohokh has to lead a meeting (lelekh wamar) to decide a matter. The decision needs consideration from a group of wise elders (nasemba). In the past, lelekh wamar also functioned as a ritual institution that served as the intermediary between nadkhoin (humans) and tali nggameri (god) known as Na Agow Allah.

== Traditional beliefs ==
Tehit people hold a belief that the wua (spirit) of a recently deceased person will go to mlfitain (afterlife). In there, wua will watch over their descendants that are still living in the world. If any violation occurs, wua will come and manifest as a disturbing spirit to prevent the descendants from repeating the violation. Wua can appear in the form of illness, boars, or closing people's fortune in hunting and other jobs. This wua disturbance is called khlembet ysimari (watched by spirits) and can only be resolved by offering hea (sacrifices) or performing sambe (forgiveness) through mimit's (shaman) assistance. The most malevolent wua is called khol, and this spirit is only afraid of tali nggameri or Na Agow Allah, who are based in ik (sky).

Like other Papuan tribes in the Doberai Peninsula, Tehit used not hokh (sacred fabric) as a currency, especially for dowry. In the Tehit people's marriage, syolo (maternal uncle) played an important role in determining the match for their niece or nephew. Therefore, the ideal marriage in Tehit society is between cross-cousins.

== Language ==
Tehit language, locally known as salo téhit, consists of 11 to 23 dialects which are Tehiyit or Tehit Dit (spoken in Teminabuan and its surroundings), Afsya (also known as Mbolfle; spoken in Weri Konda and Mbariat located in the southern part of Teminabuan), Gemna (spoken in Wehali and Eles located in northern Teminabuan), Yemian or Imian (spoken in Hana and Sanekh), Sawiat (spoken in Soroan and its surroundings), Fkour or Fkar (spoken in mountainous region), Sayfi, Konyokh, Salmeit, Yatfle, Olabra, and Sfaryere.

== Livelihood ==
Tehit people live in swampy areas. Their main source of income is cutting down and collecting sago stretch. Meanwhile, those who dwell in the forest areas mainly engage in agricultural activities by harvesting yams, taros, pumpkins, and others.
