= Rawas =

- Village
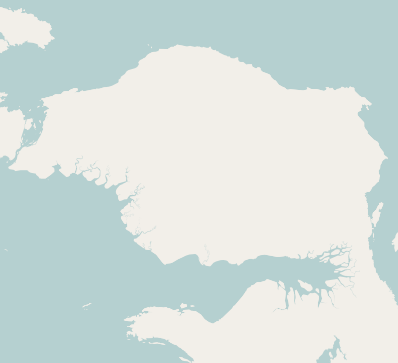
- Location in the Bird's Head Peninsula Location in Indonesia
- Coordinates: 1°14′6″S 132°11′12″E
- Country: Indonesia
- Province: Southwest Papua
- Regency: Sorong Regency
- Time zone: UTC+7 (WIB)

Rawas is a village in Southwest Papua, Indonesia. The village is located in the central part of the Bird's Head Peninsula. A dirt road connects it to Greemakolo in the southwest.
