= Maybrat people =

Ethnic group in Indonesia

Maybrat
Ra ro Meibrat
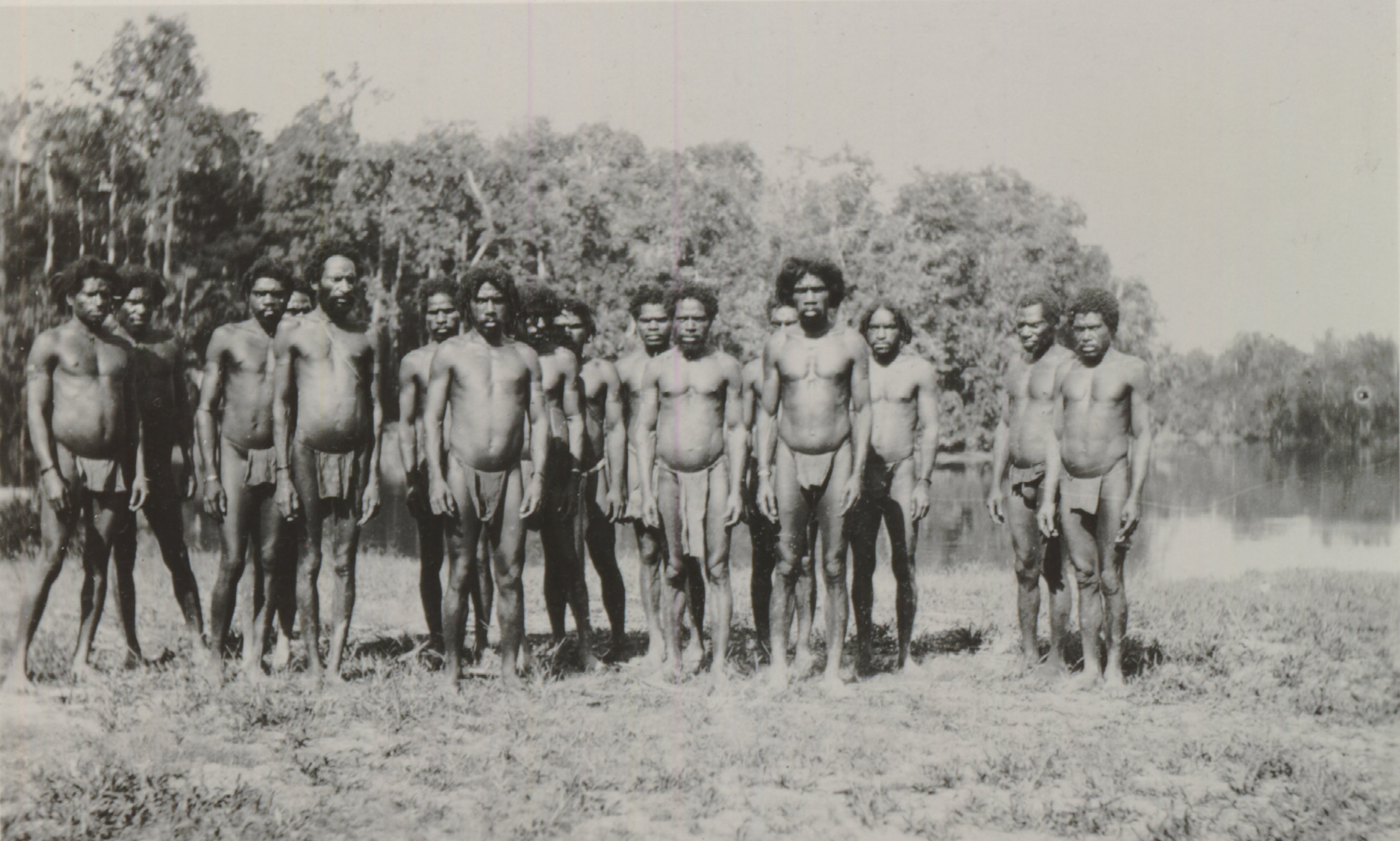
- Maybrat people near Ayamaru Lakes, 1930s

Regions with significant populations
- Indonesia (Southwest Papua)

Languages
- Maybrat, Papuan Malay, and Indonesian

Religion
- Christianity

Related ethnic groups
- Moi • Arfak • Abun

The Maybrat people (Mai Brat: Ra ro Meibrat) are an ethnic group originating from the province of Southwest Papua, Indonesia. They generally inhabit Maybrat Regency and South Sorong Regency, and speak the Maybrat language. Its distribution is mainly in the central part of the Bird's Head Peninsula, bordering the Abun and Biak Karon in the north, the Inanwatan and Kais in the south, the Moi in the west, and the Arfak in the east.

Around the 1920s to 1930s, it was recorded that two Maybrat people from the Ayamaru region were appointed by the envoy of the Tidore Sultanate as subordinate rulers (rajas), namely Flebroe Solossa as King Framu (Ayamaru) and Hwaintake Abraham Kambuaya as King Kambuaya. The inauguration took place in Wersar village, near the Kaibus River (now Teminabuan), they were given medals, a royal stick, and a songkok. The appointment letter was written in Malay and Dutch.

== Sub-groups ==
The Maybrat people are divided into several sub-groups:

- Ra ro Maru (Ayamaru (Maru) people) live around the Ayamaru Lakes.
- Ra ro Mare (Mare) live in the hills surrounding the Ayamaru Lakes.
- Ra ro Karon (Karondori (Miyah) people) live in the Miyah district.
- Ra ro Aifat/Brat (Aifat people) live east of the Aifat district.
- Ra ro Aitinyo (Aitinyo people) live in the Aitinyo district.
- Ra ro Wayer (Wayer (Maybrat Tee) people) live in the Moswaren and Wayer districts.

== Mythology ==
In Maybrat mythology, it is told that the universe and everything in it was created by a supernatural being possessing great power named Suiwa, who dwells in the sky and has a nature associated with dance. Whenever this being wishes to create something, he dances, and whatever he desires comes into existence.

Suiwa has a sibling named Mafif, who resides on earth. Mafif provides humans with knowledge needed for life—such as farming, hunting, making fire, building houses, warfare, and other skills—and gives customary rules and ritual procedures.

== Culture ==
In Maybrat society, certain individuals called wofte are believed to be able to communicate with the supernatural world. Those who lead customary ceremonies are called tochmi and ra uon. Some act as healers using mystical herbs, called bofit, while others use supernatural means for harming or influencing people, called bo mbaw.

Besides these groups, there are others known as kabes fane, more widely known in Papua as swanggi. They are believed to possess dark magic and the ability to transform into any form. These individuals received training in a traditional institution called wion (a temple-house), which was destroyed by the Dutch colonial government.

To protect the community from such forces, the Maybrat people perform traditional rituals to seek protection from the spirits of their ancestors. One such ritual is performed during pregnancy and is called Morus Tere.

=== Morus Tere ceremony ===
Morus means "to release" or "to cut", while tere means "bracelet". The name symbolizes freeing the pregnant woman and her unborn child from harmful supernatural influences. This ceremony is performed once during a pregnancy, although it has become rare today.

It is performed only for pregnancies of baby boys, and not for baby girls. The ritual occurs once pregnancy is confirmed and is held in the morning, as dawn symbolizes the beginning of a new day and new life.

The ceremony is carried out by the husband's family and held in front of the house. It is led by an elderly man from the husband's side, accompanied by the husband's clan chief, who offers guidance if needed. All relatives from both sides participate and must contribute items required for the ritual, such as food and drink. The husband's relatives must bring bo (Timor cloth) to be given to the wife's family. Traditional leaders from both clans also attend as advisers.

During the main part of the ritual, all the Timor fabrics are arranged neatly in rows on the house floor, with the most valuable cloth placed at the front. The pregnant woman is called and kneels. The husband's representative places the most valuable cloth on her head while reciting: Ey po mese safo morus mamo fari, nebe here moros matak mam tabam, which means:

O supernatural power and evil spirits who intend harm and misfortune, release your grasp and go far away so she may give birth safely and the child may live in peace.

As these words are spoken, the accompanying clan chief stomps the floor and jokingly insults the female side's relatives. This symbolizes that the husband's family is honorable and should not be underestimated, as they have successfully gathered wealth (Timor cloths) to give to the wife's family. The ceremony also elevates the husband's family's status in the eyes of the community, especially the wife's relatives.

=== Timor cloth ===
In Maybrat society, a person or family that can accumulate a large number of Timor cloths and give many to others is considered wealthy, honorable, and respected. Timor cloths are highly valued. Possessing many cloths brings prestige and is a basis for becoming a traditional leader.

This can be seen in the use of the term bobot (wealthy person) for someone who owns many Timor cloths. A bobot usually holds the position of clan chief or village head. Solidarity and mutual cooperation among relatives are very strong among the Maybrat, especially in major ceremonies where relatives play an important role in providing materials and costs needed by the hosting family.
