= Ibrahim Kosepa =

Indonesian footballer

Personal information
- Full name: Ibrahim Musa Kosepa
- Date of birth: 17 September 1995 (age 31)
- Place of birth: Sorong, Indonesia
- Height: 1.66 m (5 ft 5 in)
- Positions: Forward; winger

Senior career*
Years	Team	Apps	(Gls)
2019	Persekat Tegal	0	(0)
2021–2025	Persela Lamongan	33	(2)
- * Club domestic league appearances and goals as of 12 October 2024

Ibrahim Musa Kosepa (born 17 September 1995) is an Indonesian professional footballer who plays as a forward or winger.

== Club career ==
=== Persela Lamongan ===
He was signed for Persela Lamongan to play in Liga 1 in the 2021 season. Ibrahim made his league debut on 4 September 2021 in a match against PSIS Semarang at the Wibawa Mukti Stadium, Cikarang.

== Career statistics ==
=== Club ===
As of 12 October 2024.

Club	Season	League			Cup		Continental		Other		Total	
Club	Season	Division	Apps	Goals	Apps	Goals	Apps	Goals	Apps	Goals	Apps	Goals
Persekat Tegal	2019	Liga 3	0	0	0	0	–		–		0	0
Persela Lamongan	2021	Liga 1	18	1	0	0	–		4 (Note: Appearances in Menpora Cup)	0	22	1
Persela Lamongan	2022–23	Liga 2	7	1	0	0	–		0	0	7	1
Persela Lamongan	2023–24	Liga 2	7	0	0	0	–		0	0	7	0
Persela Lamongan	2024–25	Liga 2	1	0	0	0	–		0	0	1	0
Career total			33	2	0	0	0	0	4	0	37	2
