= Abun people =

Ethnic group of Southwest Papua, Indonesia

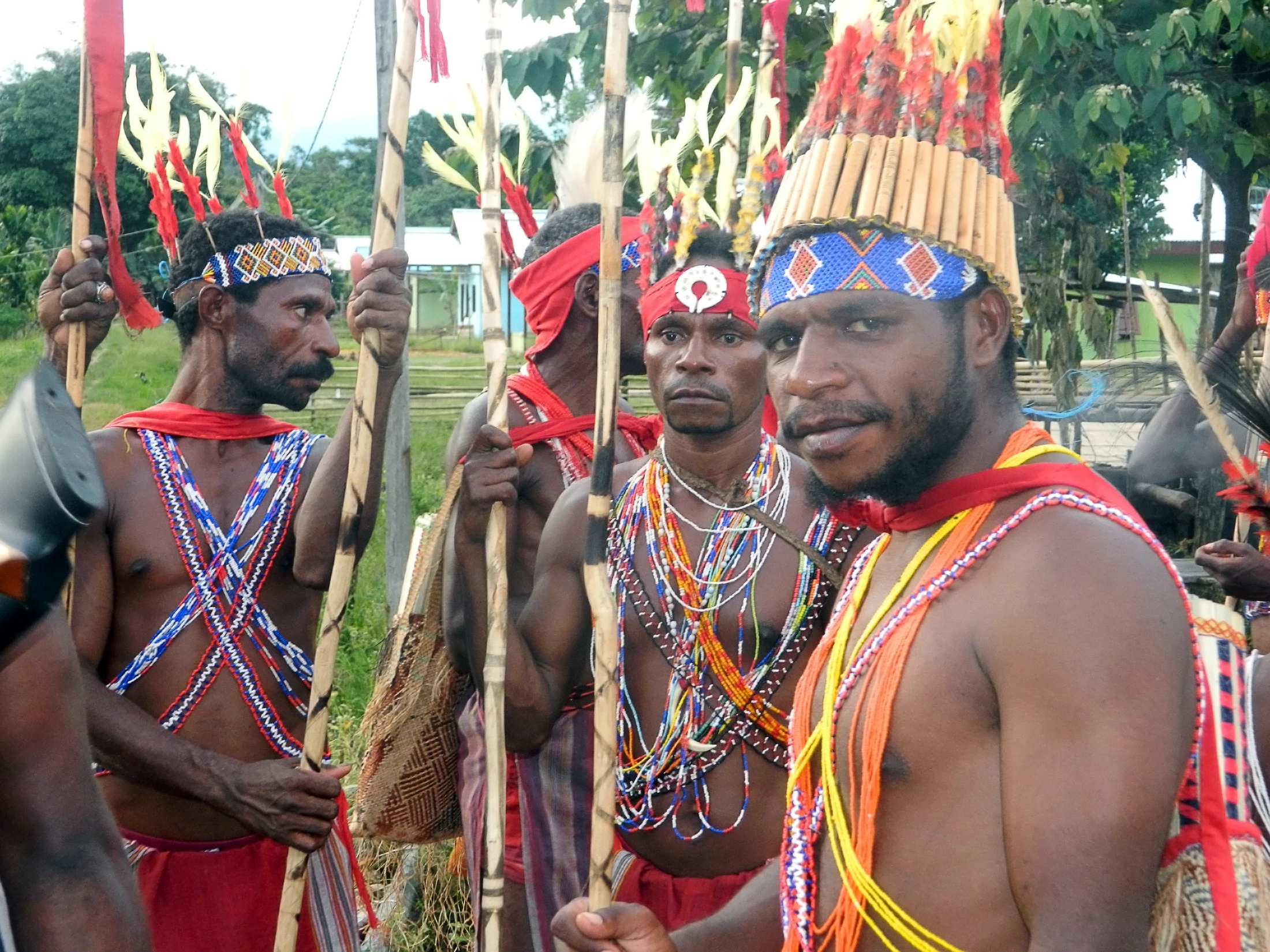

Total population
- 4,300

Regions with significant populations
- Indonesia (Tambrauw Regency, Southwest Papua)

Languages
- Abun language, Papuan Malay

Religion
- Majority: Christianity Minority: Indigenous beliefs

Related ethnic groups
- Biak Karon (Bikar), Maybrat (Karon Dori)

The Abun, previously also known as Wen, Karon Pantai, or Coastal Karon, are an ethnic group of New Guinea, residing in the Sausapor district of the Tambrauw Regency in the province of Southwest Papua. They speak the Abun language. They live in the Sausapor, Jokte, Emaos and Uigwem villages of Sausapor and are of the clans Yekwam, Yenjau, Yeblo, Yesnath, Yenbra, Yenggrem, Yesomkor, Yerin, Yeror, Yewen, Yemam and Yesian.

== Name ==
The Abun were originally the Wen from the Tambrauw Mountains (locally called the Ndokdar Mountains). After having socialized with the Biak people near the coastline, they were then called the Karon (meaning: the people from within), while the ones who continued to stay in the mountains were called Karondori. However, this eventually had negative connotations and they adopted the name Abun (meaning: tribal language), which originally was used for the name of their language.

== Culture ==
=== Farming ===
The Abun are primarily banana farmers. 21 categorizations of bananas are named and are divided by whether it is eaten fresh or cooked first. The harvesting of the bananas are done by both men and women; typically but not necessarily being the men chopping the trees and the women transporting the fruit. On most days, they head to the farms which are around 1–2 km away between 8–9 am (WIT) and return home by 5pm.

Local Names for the Types of Bananas (Weu)
Eaten fresh	Eaten cooked
Kuit	Mbusye
Raja	Nggaris
Bofuf	Rah
Ney	Mber
Sasup	Ndau
Vot	Siwon
Pih	Mbrim
Yu	San buer
	Kui
	Jeawi
	Makum
	Yekman

=== Leadership ===
The highest ranking leader of the Abun tradition is called the Yekwesu who governs the Wis in the village. Every Wis also has a leader Yehos who help the Yekwesu govern. Anyone can become a Yekwesu with their own efforts, but has to be rich in cloth (kain timor), and also be brave, wise, generous and diplomatic.

=== Salara Dance ===
The Salara is a traditional dance performed in a group with a snake-like formation possibly in a circle; holding one another by the arms to form a chain. It is said that the ancestors of the Abun people turned into a snake and left the mountains for the beach. The dance is similar to the other Tari Tumbu Tanah of the Arfak people.

== See also ==
- Indigenous people of New Guinea
