= Teminabuan =

- District
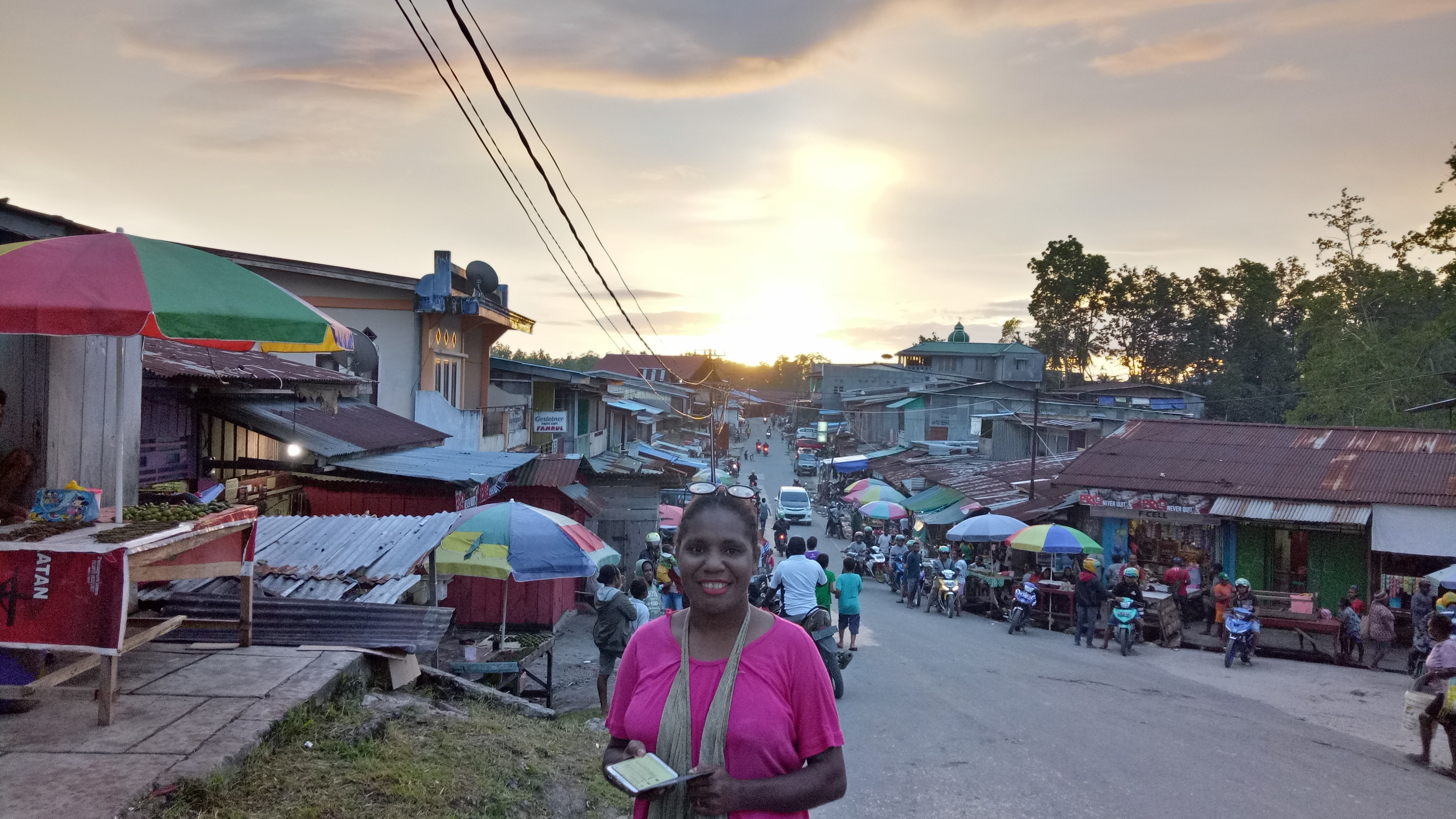

- Location of the district in the Bird's Head Peninsula Location of the district in Indonesian Papua Location of the district in Indonesia
- Coordinates: 1°26′0″S 132°1′0″E
- Country: Indonesia
- Province: Southwest Papua
- Regency: South Sorong Regency

Area
  - Total: 386.89 km^{2} (149.38 sq mi)

Population (mid 2024 estimate)
  - Total: 20,648
  - Density: 53.369/km^{2} (138.23/sq mi)
- Time zone: UTC+9 (WIT)

Teminabuan is an administrative district (distrik) in South Sorong Regency, in Southwest Papua, Indonesia. The district includes the town of Kaibus (which serves as the administrative capital of South Sorong Regency) and its northern suburb of Kohoin. The district had a population of 11,627 at the 2010 Census and 19,491 at the 2020 Census; the official estimate as at mid 2024 was 20,648. The town of Kaibus is located in the southwestern-central part of the Bird's Head Peninsula, and had a population of 4,743 in mid 2022. The area was bombed between January and March 1967 by the Indonesian National Army in Papua conflict. It is served by Teminabuan Airport.

== Notable people ==
- Marlina Flassy - anthropologist and Dean of the Faculty of Social and Political Sciences at Cenderawasih University.
- Raja Kaibus, Anggok Kondjol - slaver king, ruler of weri Ambuam which became Teminabuan
