= Duriankari people =

Duriankari
Total population
- 15 (1979)

Languages
- Duriankari (extinct), Moi, Ma'ya (Salawati), dan Indonesian

Religion
- Christianity (especially Protestantism)

Related ethnic groups
- Inanwatan • Moi • Ma'ya

Duriankari people, also known as Efpan, are an ethnic group living in Duriankari, Central Salawati District, Sorong Regency, Southwest Papua, Indonesia. They previously spoke the Duriankari language (Duriankere), which became extinct in the 1990s; the language was replaced by the Moi and Ma'ya (Salawati) languages. They rely on sago harvesting and fishing.

The population of this tribe is nearly extinct. In 1979, only 15 people identified themselves as Duriankari, making them the smallest population among the surrounding ethnic groups. Because of their small numbers, the Duriankari assimilated and have always lived among the Kawit people, a subgroup of the Moi. As a result, they are sometimes also referred to as Kawit people. The Duriankari generally practice Protestant Christianity.

== Geographical distribution ==
Most of the Duriankari people assimilated with the Kawit. The village they inhabit, Duriankari, is predominantly populated by the Kawit people, who make up 70% of the village's total population. Duriankari is located in the southern part of Salawati.

== Language ==
Duriankari language was one of only two non-Austronesian languages spoken in the Raja Ampat Islands; the other is Seget, a member of the West Bird's Head language family, spoken in eastern and southern Salawati. The Inanwatan regard Duriankari speakers as their descendants who were carried off to the west by a mythical flood.

The Duriankari language, which is now extinct, was spoken in a village in the southern part of Salawati and is believed to be related to the Inanwatan language of the southern Bird's Head coast. Both the Duriankari and Seget groups are considered new migrants to the Raja Ampat Islands. However, there is strong linguistic evidence that non-Austronesian languages were spoken in the islands prior to the arrival of Austronesian-speaking populations.
