= Waliam language =

Waliam may be any of several languages on Salawati Island:

- Moi language (Papuan)
- Seget language (Papuan)
- Salawati language (Papuan-influenced Austronesian)
