= Ambel language =

Austronesian language spoken in Indonesia

Ambel
- Amber, Waigeo
- galí Ambél, galí Mayá
- Native to: Indonesia
- Region: Waigeo
- Native speakers: 1,600 (2018)
- Language family: Austronesian: Malayo-Polynesian; Central–Eastern Malayo-Polynesian; Eastern Malayo-Polynesian; South Halmahera–West New Guinea; Raja Ampat–South Halmahera; Raja Ampat; Ambel–As; Ambel
- Dialects: Metnyo; Metsam

Language codes
- ISO 639-3: wgo
- Glottolog: waig1244
- Coordinates: 0.18°S 130.92°E

Ambel (Amber), also known as Waigeo after the island where it is primarily spoken, is a heavily Papuan-influenced Austronesian language spoken on the island of Waigeo in the Raja Ampat archipelago near the northwestern tip of West Papua, Indonesia. It is spoken by approximately 1,600 people. It is endangered, as the population is shifting to Papuan Malay and few people born after the year 2000 have any knowledge of the language.

== Name ==
The name Ambel is probably derived from the Biak word amber, meaning "foreigner" or "stranger". It was adapted into the language itself, where the designation is galí Ambél. The alternative name Waigeo is named after the island.

Speakers of Ambel consider themselves to be part of the Ma'ya tribe, hence the alternative designation galí Mayá, despite Ambel only being remotely related to Ma'ya via descent from Proto-Raja Ampat–South Halmahera.

== Dialects ==
Ambel is spoken by approximately 1,600 people on Waigeo, an island in the Raja Ampat archipelago near the northwestern tip of West Papua, Indonesia. There are two dialects of Ambel:

- Metsam Ambel, spoken in the two villages of Warsamdin and Kalitoko on Waigeo Island
- Metnyo Ambel, spoken in the nine villages of Warimak, Waifoi, Kabilo, Go, Kapadiri, Kabare, Bonsayor, Darumbab, and Andey on Waigeo Island

Ambel speakers live alongside Biak speakers in the three villages of Warsamdin, Kabare, and Andey.

== Distribution ==
Ambel is spoken in the following locations within Raja Ampat Regency:

- Waigeo Utara District: Kabare and Kapadiri villages.
- Teluk Manyalibit District: Kabilol, Go, Waifoy, Warimak, Kalitoko and Warsamdin villages.

== Phonology ==
The sounds of the Ambel language are as follows:

Consonant sounds
	Labial	Dental/ Alveolar	Palatal	Velar
Plosive	p b	t̪ d		k g
Fricative		s		h
Nasal	m	n		
Rhotic		r		
Lateral		l		
Glide			j	w

/h/ can be heard as [f] or [ɸ] in free variation.

Vowel sounds
	Front	Back
Close	i	u
Mid	e	o
Open	a	

== Proto-language ==
Arnold (2018) reconstructs two tonemes for proto-Ambel, high /3/ and rising /12/, which is similar to the tonal system of Ma'ya.

Below are some monosyllabic proto-Ambel reconstructed lexical forms that have cognates with Matbat and Ma'ya. The Misool dialect is given for some Ma'ya forms; they are otherwise from the Salawati dialect.

gloss	Proto-Ambel	Matbat	Ma'ya
'betel leaf'	*nyan	na¹n	ˈnya¹²n
'breast'	–	su³	ˈsu³s
'canoe'	*wan	wa³ŋ	ˈwa¹²k
'come'	–	bo³t	ˈbo³t
'die'	*mna³t	ma¹²t	ˈma¹²t
'eight'	*wa³l	-wa³l	ˈwa³l
'enter'	*sun	hu³ŋ	ˈsu³n
'fire'	*lap	ya³p	ˈla¹²p
'fish'	*dun	–	ˈdo³n
'five'	*lim	li³m	ˈli³m
'four'	*fa³t	fa³t	ˈfa¹²t
'full'	*fon	fo³n	ˈfo¹²n
'give'	*bi	be²¹	ˈbe (Misool)
'good'	*fi	fi³	ˈfi³
'green/blue'	*bya³w	bla¹²w	–
'ground, earth'	*ba³t	ba³t	ˈba¹²t
'hear'	–	no⁴¹ŋ	ˈdo¹²n
'kill'	*bun	bu³n	ˈbu³n
'know'	*un	-u²¹n	-ˈun (Misool)
'louse'	*o¹²wt	wu³t	ˈu³t
'man'	*ma³n	(wa³y)ma²¹n	ˈma¹²n (Misool)
'mother'	*ne³n	ne³n	ˈne¹²n
'mountain'	*i³l	he³l	ˈye³l
'mouth'	–	ga²¹l	ˈgal
'much'	–	to¹²	ˈmo¹²t
'needle'	*yam	la¹m	–
'night'	*gam	ka¹m	–
'person'	*me³t	ma³t	ˈmat
'rice'	*fa	fa³s	ˈfa¹²s
'rise, ascend'	*sa	ha³	ˈsa³
'sago'	*bi¹²	–	ˈbi³
'sand'	*layn	ye³n	ˈle¹²n
'sea turtle'	*fi³n	fe³n	ˈfe³n
'seawards'	–	lo³l	ˈlo³l
'see'	*e³m	-ɛ³ŋ	-ˈe¹²m
'shoot'	–	-a¹n	ˈfa¹²n
'snake'	*kok	ko³k	ˈko¹²k
'swim'	*la³	la³s	-ˈa¹²s (Misool)
'three'	*tu³l	to³l	ˈto³l
'tree, wood'	*a³y	ha³y	ˈai
'two'	*lu	lu³	ˈlu³
'village'	*nu 'house'	nu³	ˈpnu³
'walk'	*ta³n	–	ˈdak (Misool)
'white'	*bus	bu³	ˈbu³s
'woman'	*bin	(wa¹t)bi³n 'kind of mangrove'	ˈpi³n

== Bibliography ==
- Arnold, Laura (2016). Lexical tone in Ambel. Paper presented at the 8th Austronesian and Papuan Languages and Linguistics Conference.
- Arnold, Laura Melissa (2018). Grammar of Ambel, an Austronesian language of Raja Ampat, west New Guinea (PhD thesis). University of Edinburgh. hdl:1842/31120.
- Arnold, Laura (2018b). "Lexical Tone in Metnyo Ambel". Oceanic Linguistics. 57 (1): 199–220. doi:10.1353/ol.2018.0007. S2CID 149762919.
