= Vexillum aequatoriense =

Scientific classification
- Kingdom: Animalia
- Phylum: Mollusca
- Class: Gastropoda
- Subclass: Caenogastropoda
- Order: Neogastropoda
- Superfamily: Turbinelloidea
- Family: Costellariidae
- Genus: Vexillum
- Species: V. aequatoriense

Binomial name
- Vexillum aequatoriense Herrmann & Stossier, 2011

Synonyms
- Vexillum (Pusia) aequatoriense Herrmann & Stossier, 2011

Species of gastropod

Vexillum aequatoriense is a species of sea snail, a marine gastropod mollusk, in the family Costellariidae, the ribbed miters.

== Distribution ==
This marine species occurs off Waigeo Island, Indonesia.
