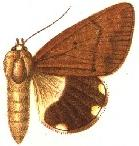

Scientific classification
- Kingdom: Animalia
- Phylum: Arthropoda
- Class: Insecta
- Order: Lepidoptera
- Superfamily: Noctuoidea
- Family: Erebidae
- Genus: Achaea
- Species: A. simplex

Binomial name
- Achaea simplex Walker, 1865

= Achaea simplex =

Species of moth

Achaea simplex is a species of moth of the family Erebidae. It is found in Waigeo, Mysol, the northern Moluccas, Sulawesi and Borneo.
