= Biga language =

Austronesian language spoken in West Papua

Biga
- Native to: Indonesia
- Region: Misool Island
- Native speakers: (300 cited 2001)
- Language family: Austronesian: Malayo-Polynesian; Central–Eastern Malayo-Polynesian; Eastern Malayo-Polynesian; South Halmahera–West New Guinea; Raja Ampat–South Halmahera; Raja Ampat; Nuclear Raja Ampat; Ma'ya–Salawati; Ma'ya; Biga

Language codes
- ISO 639-3: bhc
- Glottolog: biga1238
- ELP: Biga
- Location of Misool Island, Biga is spoken in the southern part of this island.
- Coordinates: 2.00°S 130.27°E

Biga is a heavily Papuan-influenced Austronesian language spoken in Southwest Papua, Indonesia in the south of the island of Misool. It is the predominant spoken language in the single village of Biga in Misool Timur Selatan District.

Its status is slightly less precarious than other Raja Ampat–South Halmahera languages, as children of the village still learn the Biga language. However, its use by the younger generation is limited to speech to elders, and Papuan Malay dominates child-to-child speech.

Laura Arnold classifies Biga as a divergent dialect of the Ma'ya language.
