= Matbat language =

Austronesian language spoken in West Papua, Indonesia

Matbat
- Misool
- Native to: Indonesia
- Region: Misool, Raja Ampat Islands
- Ethnicity: Matbat and Matlow
- Native speakers: (1,000–1,500 cited 2001)
- Language family: Austronesian: Malayo-Polynesian; Central–Eastern Malayo-Polynesian; Eastern Malayo-Polynesian; South Halmahera–West New Guinea; Raja Ampat–South Halmahera; Raja Ampat; Nuclear Raja Ampat; Matbat
- Dialects: Aduwei; Gam; Matlow; Me Yot (Me Tip)

Language codes
- ISO 639-3: xmt
- Glottolog: matb1237
- Coordinates: 1.88°S 130.07°E

Matbat is a heavily Papuan-influenced Austronesian language spoken in Southwest Papua, Indonesia, on the island of Misool, Raja Ampat Islands. Its dialects are Magey and Tomolol. Similar to the neighboring Ma'ya language, Matbat is one of a handful of Austronesian languages with true lexical tone rather than a pitch-accent system or complete lack of phonemic tonal contrasts as with most other Austronesian languages.

== Distribution ==
Matbat is spoken in the following locations within Raja Ampat Regency:

- Misool Timur District: Tumolol, Lenmalas, Lenmalas Timur Barat, Audam, Foley, and Eduai villages
- Misool Utara District: Atkari and Salafen villages
- Misool Barat District: Magei village

== Dialects ==
The Matbat language is divided into several dialects, but generally four distinct dialects: Aduwei, Gam, Matlow, and Me Yot (Me Tip). Based on their speech area, they are as follows:

- The Aduwei dialect is spoken in the north and a small part in the south, including the villages of Salafen, Aduwei, and Atkari.
- The Gam dialect is spoken in the villages of Waya Gam, Magey, and parts of Kapatcol.
- The Matlow dialect is spoken on the south and east coast of Misool Island, especially in the villages of Fafanlap, Kafopop (Kayerepop), Yellu, Dabatan, and Gamta. It is also considered a separate language by the Language Development and Fostering Agency. However, in general, the differences are not very pronounced. This dialect is also known as Matbat Laut or Misool.
- The Me Yot (Me Tip) dialect is the dialect with the most speakers. This dialect covers most of southern Misool Island and the interior, including areas such as the villages of Me Yot, Bemlol, Audam, Temulol (Tomolol), Folley (Me Fol), Lenmalas, and Atkari.

== Phonology ==
The phonology of the Matbat language is summarized below:

Consonant sounds
	Labial	Alveolar	Palatal	Velar	Glottal
Plosive	p b	t d		k g	
Fricative	f	s			h
Nasal	m	n		ŋ	
Lateral		l			
Glide			j	w	

/j/ can be heard freely as [ʝ] or [ɟ] in word-initial position.

Vowel sounds
	Front	Back
Close	i	u
Mid	e	o
Mid	ɛ	ɔ
Open	a	

=== Tones ===
Matbat has five lexical tones: high falling ˥˩ 41, high ˦ 3, low rising ˩˨ 12, low level ˩ 1, and low falling ˨˩ 21, which in open syllables has a peaking allophone, ˩˨˩ 121. Most Matbat words are monosyllabic; additional syllables in polysyllabic words are often weak and toneless, though a few words do have two tonic syllables. Examples of some of the longer monomorphemic words are /kamow˩˨/ 'star', /wuj˦te/ 'sea shore', /sapu˥˩luj˩˨/ 'round', /bim˦bom˩˨˩pu/ 'butterfly'.

== Evolution ==
Tonogenesis in Matbat remains unclear. Some Matbat reflexes of Proto-Malayo-Polynesian (PMP) proto-forms are listed below.

- PMP *bunuq > Mayá bu³n 'kill'
- PMP *penuq > fo¹²n 'full'
- PMP *salaq > sa³l 'error'
- PMP *qateluR (> *teluR) > to¹²l 'egg'
- PMP *matay > ma¹²t 'die'
- PMP *kutu > u³t 'louse'

== Numerals ==
Matbat, a Malayo-Polynesian language, shares a basic numeral vocabulary. Here is a comparison with Indonesian and its translation.

Gloss	Matbat	Indonesian
one	sa	satu
two	lu	dua
three	tol	tiga
four	itat	empat
five	ilim	lima
six	inom	enam
seven	ifit	tujuh
eight	iwal	delapan
nine	isiu	sembilan
ten	iya	sepuluh
eleven	yamaten	sebelas
twenty	yalu	dua puluh
fifty	yun	lima puluh
one hundred	yip	seratus
