= Southwest Papua =

Province in Western New Guinea, Indonesia

Southwest Papua Papua Barat Daya
- Province with special status
- Province of Southwest Papua; Provinsi Papua Barat Daya
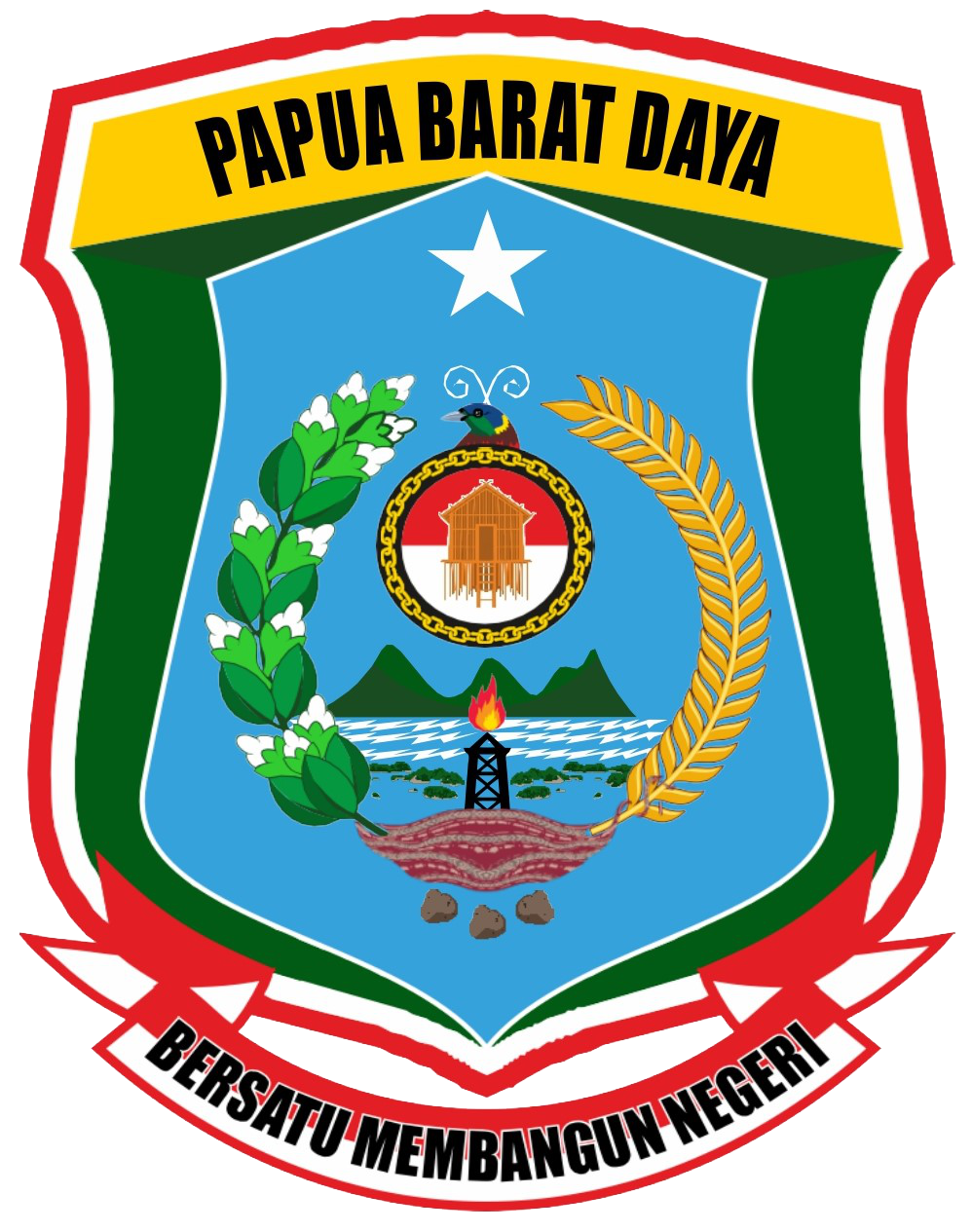
- Coat of arms
- Motto: Bersatu Membangun Negeri "Unite to Build the Country"
- Southwest Papua in Indonesia
- Interactive map of Southwest Papua
- Coordinates (Sorong): 0°52′S 131°15′E
- Country: Indonesia
- Region: Western New Guinea (Eastern Indonesia)
- Capital and largest city: Sorong

Government
  - Body: Southwest Papua Provincial Government
  - Governor: Elisa Kambu (Gerindra)
  - Vice Governor: Ahmad Nausrau
  - Legislature: Southwest Papua House of Representatives (DPRPBD)

Area
  - Total: 39,122.95 km^{2} (15,105.46 sq mi)

Population (mid-2025 estimate)
  - Total: 636,434
  - Density: 16.2675/km^{2} (42.1327/sq mi)

Demographics
  - Ethnic groups: See ethnic groups
  - Religion: Christianity 61.65%: Protestant 54.05%; Catholic 7.16%; Islam 38.14% Hinduism 0.1% Buddhism 0.1%
  - Languages: Indonesian (official); Abun, Kokoda, Maybrat, Ma'ya, Miyah, Moi, Mpur, Papuan Malay, Suabo, Tehit, Waigeo, Yahadian
- Time zone: UTC+09:00 (Indonesia Eastern Time)
- ISO 3166 code: ID-PD
- HDI (2024): ▲0.697 (33rd) – (Medium)
- Website: papuabaratdayaprov.go.id

Southwest Papua (Indonesian: Papua Barat Daya; Indonesian pronunciation: [papʊa barat daja]) is the 38th province of Indonesia to be created and was split off from West Papua (province) on 8 December 2022. The label "southwest" is a misnomer, as this province is located at the northwestern tip of Indonesian Papua. The province comprises the Greater Sorong area (Indonesian: Sorong Raya; Indonesian pronunciation: [ˌsɔrɔŋ ˈraja]) which consists of Sorong City, Sorong Regency, South Sorong Regency, Maybrat Regency, Tambrauw Regency, and Raja Ampat Regency. The Bill (RUU) on the Establishment of the Southwest Papua Province was passed into law (by Act No. 29 of 2022), and it became the 38th province in Indonesia with effect from 8 December 2022.

Southwest Papua is located at the northwestern tip of an area called the Doberai Peninsula or the Bird's Head Peninsula. The westernmost tip of this province is the Raja Ampat Regency Regional Marine Protected Area, which has a high diversity of marine life such as coral reefs, giant turtles, manta rays and whale sharks. The Raja Ampat Islands consists of various islands such as Batanta, Misool, Salawati, and Waigeo. The capital of Southwest Papua is Sorong, an oil and gas producer and an entry hub to Papua. The province of Southwest Papua contains ecosystems including tropical rainforests and mountains. Tambrauw Regency is a popular birdwatching destination and has declared its area as Conservation Regency in order to promote ecotourism.

== History ==
=== Sultanate of Tidore ===
The Raja Ampat Islands, located in Southwest Papua, have a long-standing history of having its own traditional government, governed by indigenous landowners known as Jaja, and the ethnic Ma'ya kings known as Fun from Waigeo who migrated to the other islands. They were later influenced by the Sultanate of Bacan and the Sultanate of Tidore, hence they adopted the Moluccan title of Kolano, as part of the sultanate expansion under Gurabesi. The 'Four Kings' (called Kalana Fat in Ma'ya or Korano Ngaruha in Tidore or Raja Ampat in Indonesian) were appointed by the Tidore Sultan as administrators for the scattered group of islands and some coastal regions in Papua Island. These were three brothers: Fun Giwar, the ancestor of kings in Waigeo; Fun Malaban, the ancestor of kings in Salawati; Fun Bis, the ancestor of kings in Lilinta, west Misool. Later on, Tidore appointed another king, Tuimadahe, who was the ancestor of kings in Waigama, east Misool. His descendants merged with the native Matbat Jaja line. Fun Mo, an unrelated Moi from south of Sorong, became ancestor of kings in Sailolof, and later married the daughter of a king from Waigeo.

=== Colonial period ===
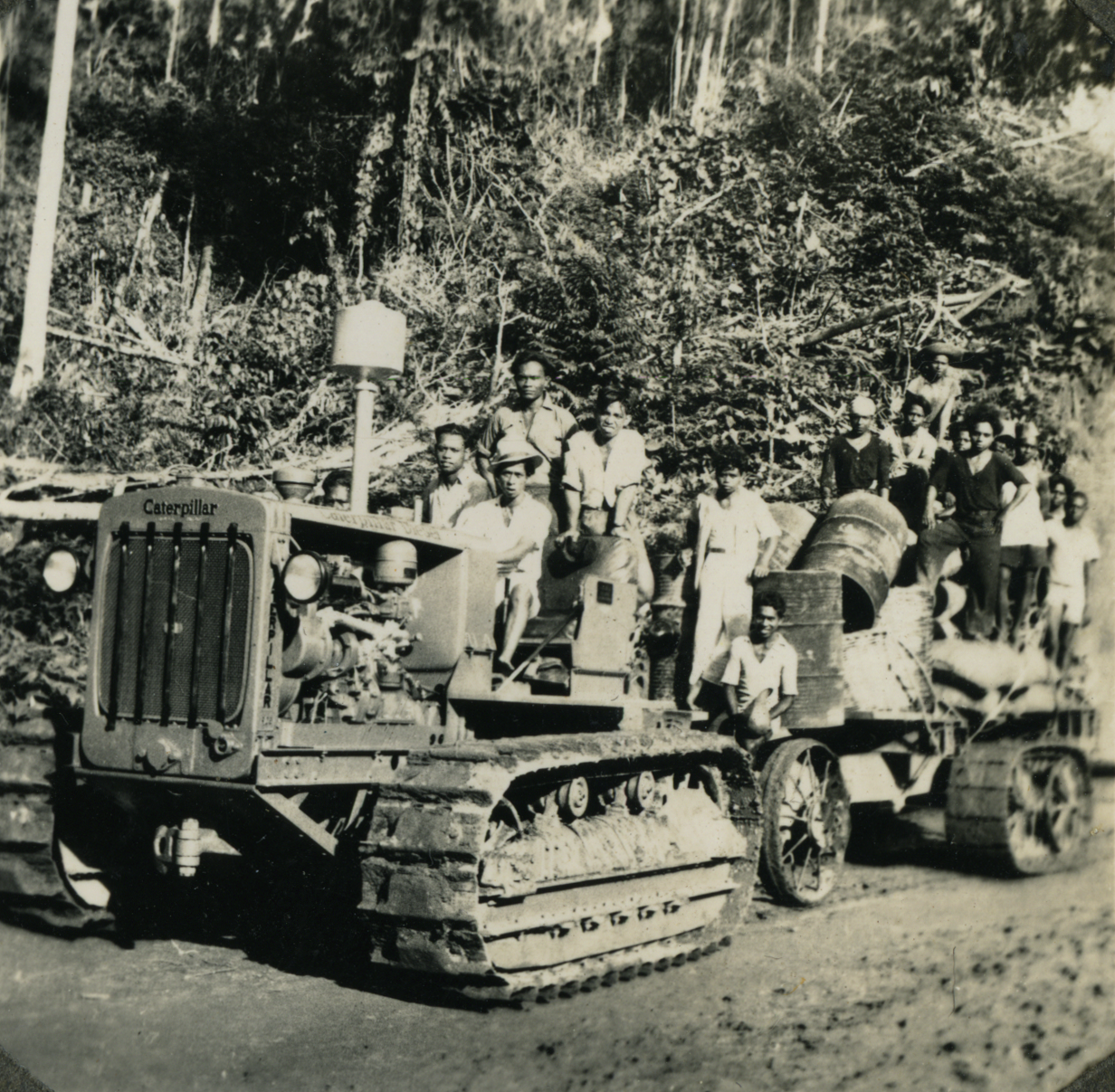
Caterpillar tractor on the Kasim-Sele road used for oil and gas exploration in the 1930s

Tidore Sultanate became a Dutch protectorate in 17th century. At that time, Papua was considered to have little economic value compared to other islands, so the Tidore Sultanate was left to govern and tax it. This is recorded in history, three people from the Teminabuan and Ayamaru regions were appointed as kings as a subordinate region of Tidore (zelfbestuur). They are Angguok Kondjol (Fle-Fle Kondjol) as the Raja Kaibus, Isak Besi Thesia as the Raja Siribau, Flebroe Solossa as the Raja Framu (Ayamaru), then also Raja Kambuaya. However, in the late 19th century, the Dutch Government realized that colonizing Papua could prevent other Europeans from approaching other islands in the Dutch East Indies, which would have disrupted their trade monopoly, particularly in spices in the Maluku Islands. As a result, the territory was governed more directly. Until the end of the 19th century, the main commodities in Papua were slaves and bird-of-paradise feathers. In the early 20th century, mineral potential in Papua began to be discovered by Europeans. In 1935, the Nederlandsch Nieuw Guinee Petroleum Maatschappij (NNGPM) was established to conduct exploration of oil and gas. Oil was discovered in several locations, including Klamono and the Sele Strait (the strait between Papua Island and Salawati Island) in the Sorong Regency.

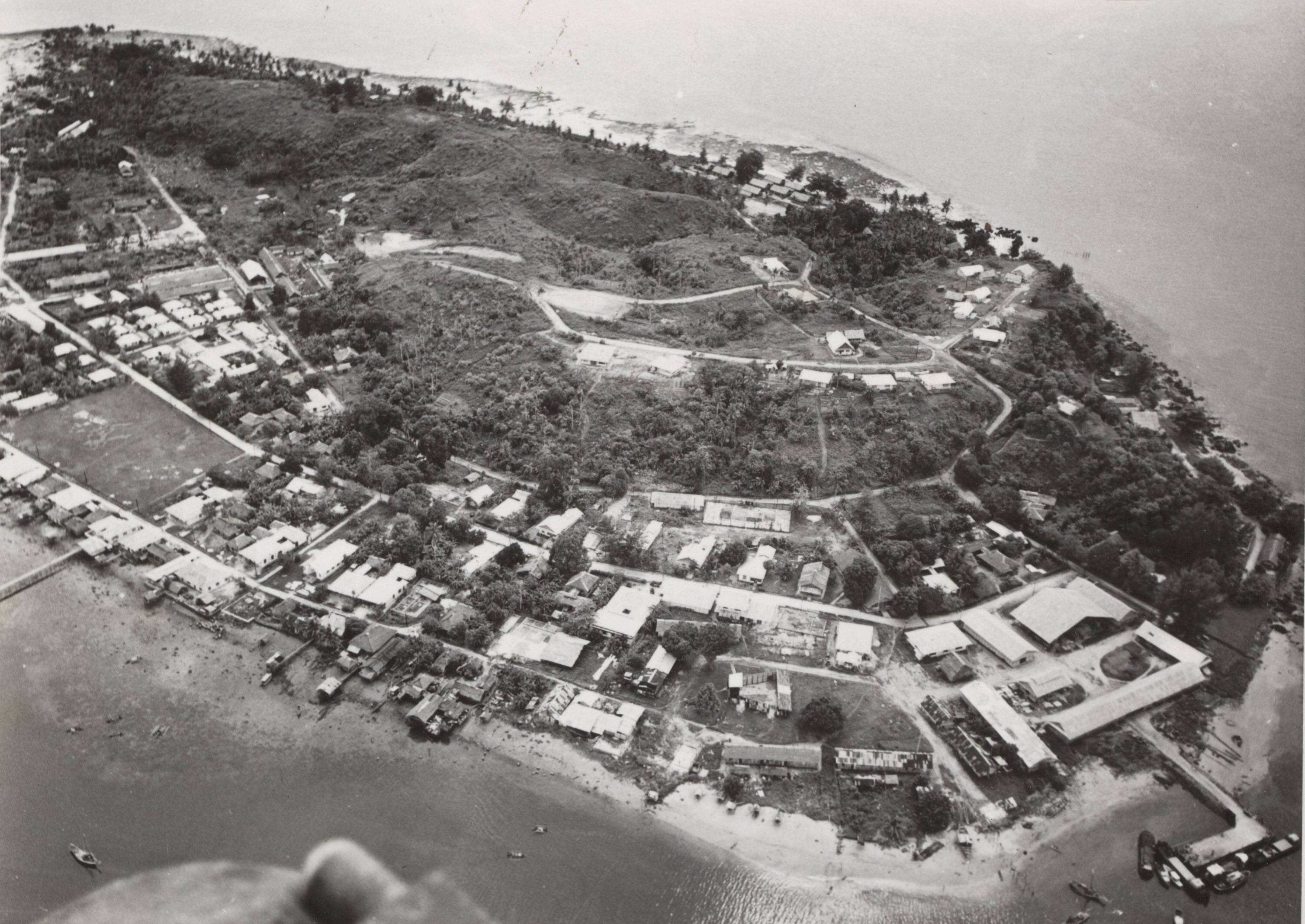
Doom Island in 1955

At the beginning of the 20th century, the Dutch divided New Guinea into several parts called afdeeling. One of these parts was Afdeeling Noord Nieuw Guinea (North New Guinea) based in Manokwari. Each afdeeling was further divided into several onderafdeeling, one of which was the Sorong onderafdeeling centered on Doom Island. The Dutch then constructed offices, churches, and settlements on this island, making it a trading center and port. Residents who lived there at the time recount how Doom Island was brightly illuminated at night, even though the now major city of Sorong was still pitch black.

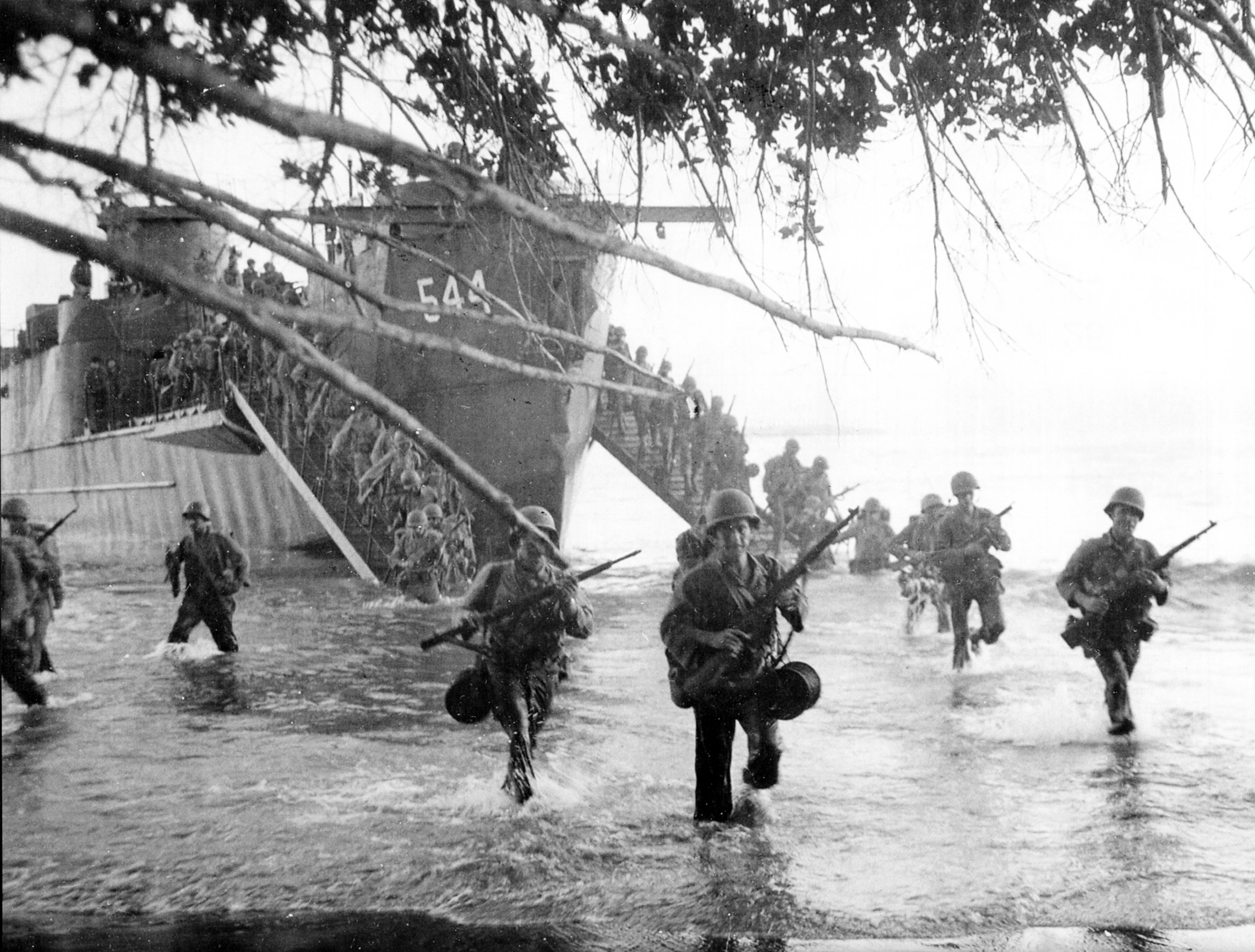
Allied troops landing in Sausapor, Tambrauw in July 1944

During World War II, Papua was occupied by the Japanese in 1942 and became an area of intense fighting. The allied troops, led by General Douglas MacArthur, implemented the "island hopping" strategy to disrupt the Japanese logistics chain. They gradually took control of the north coast of Papua, starting from Jayapura, then Biak, and moving to the next islands, until they reached Sausapor in Tambrauw Regency. The Allies sent spies to find a suitable place to land, and Sausapor beach was chosen. In Operation Globetrotter, which took place between July and August 1944, the weakly defended Sausapor was captured by the allied forces. An airstrip was then built at Sausapor, which became the allied base for attacking the Moluccas and the Philippines. Japanese forces in Manokwari and Sorong, who were cut off from other units, fled to the forest and hid until the war was over. The Sausapor operation marked the liberation of Papua from Japan, and many remnants of the war can still be found in the area today.

=== Post colonial ===
This region became the site of confrontation during Operation Trikora due to its proximity to Indonesian territory in the Maluku Islands. The first incursion into the Raja Ampat islands was an attempt by PG 200 on 14 September 1961 with 39 men under Lieutenant Jamaluddin Nasution. Lieutenant Nasution and two Papuans, Gerson Esuru (from Warwasi Village, Arguni) and Wos Rumaserang (both from the Gerakan Pelarian Pemuda) died in this attempt. This was then followed by PG 300, with command company 191261 under Lieutenant Nana managing to infiltrate Gag Island and later joined by 29 local islanders. While command company 191260 under Serma Boy Thomas managed to reach Cape Dalpele in Waigeo Island after hiding in Bala-Bala Island. These efforts were followed by other infiltration of PG 400 (survivors of KRI Macan Tutul) led by Charles Papilaya and PG 500 (former Permesta rebels) led by Jonkey Robert Kumontoy and managed to join with Herlina Kasim and also PG 200 who had arrived earlier. The island of Waigeo was a safe haven for Indonesian troops as Dutch forces rarely patrolled the region. While in Sorong, Simon Randa, a Torajan, with the Moi tribes supplied Indonesian guerilla forces called enso-enso lit. 'red-white' in the Moi language.

The dispute of Western New Guinea was resolved with the signing of the New York Agreement, putting the region under the United Nations Temporary Executive Authority (UNTEA) until it was transferred to Indonesian control in 1963. In 1969, the Act of Free Choice or PEPERA lit. 'Determination of the People's Opinion' was held, which controversially formalized West Irian as Indonesian territory. The government subsequently restructured the administrative divisions of the region, changing the former Sorong onderafdeeling to Sorong Regency, which now covers an area similar to that of the present Southwest Papua Province. The small island of Doom was abandoned, while the city of Sorong on the mainland of Papua Island has grown increasingly crowded and densely populated due to its strategic location. Doom Island is now the capital of Sorong Islands District, and some of the old buildings have been restored to serve as government offices. The population of Sorong has also increased with the government's transmigration program. Because of Sorong's rapid growth, the local government proposed an increase in the status of Sorong to become an Administrative City which was approved by the Ministry of Home Affairs in 1996.

On 4 October 1999, Sorong City was formalized by law and separated from Sorong Regency. The existence of regional autonomy has caused rapid expansion in the number of regencies and districts. Sorong Regency has become smaller in size due to this regional division. On 11 December 2002 South Sorong Regency and Raja Ampat Regency were created from parts of Sorong Regency, then in 2008 Tambrauw Regency (on 29 October) and Maybrat Regency (on 19 December) were created from other parts of Sorong Regency. The support for the creation of a new province was due to dispute on the location of West Papua's provincial capital between Sorong and Manokwari. Manokwari faction argues that Manokwari is a mnukwar (old village), because it was the location of the original Dutch residents. After the decision to pick Manokwari, John Piet Wanane, the Regent of Sorong, began to coordinate efforts to create a new province for the former Sorong Regency, called Sorong Raya, which is based according to the ethnic groups that exist in the region. What was then the whole of the former Sorong Regency was later formalized in law to become Southwest Papua Province in 2022 after 20 years of advocacy.

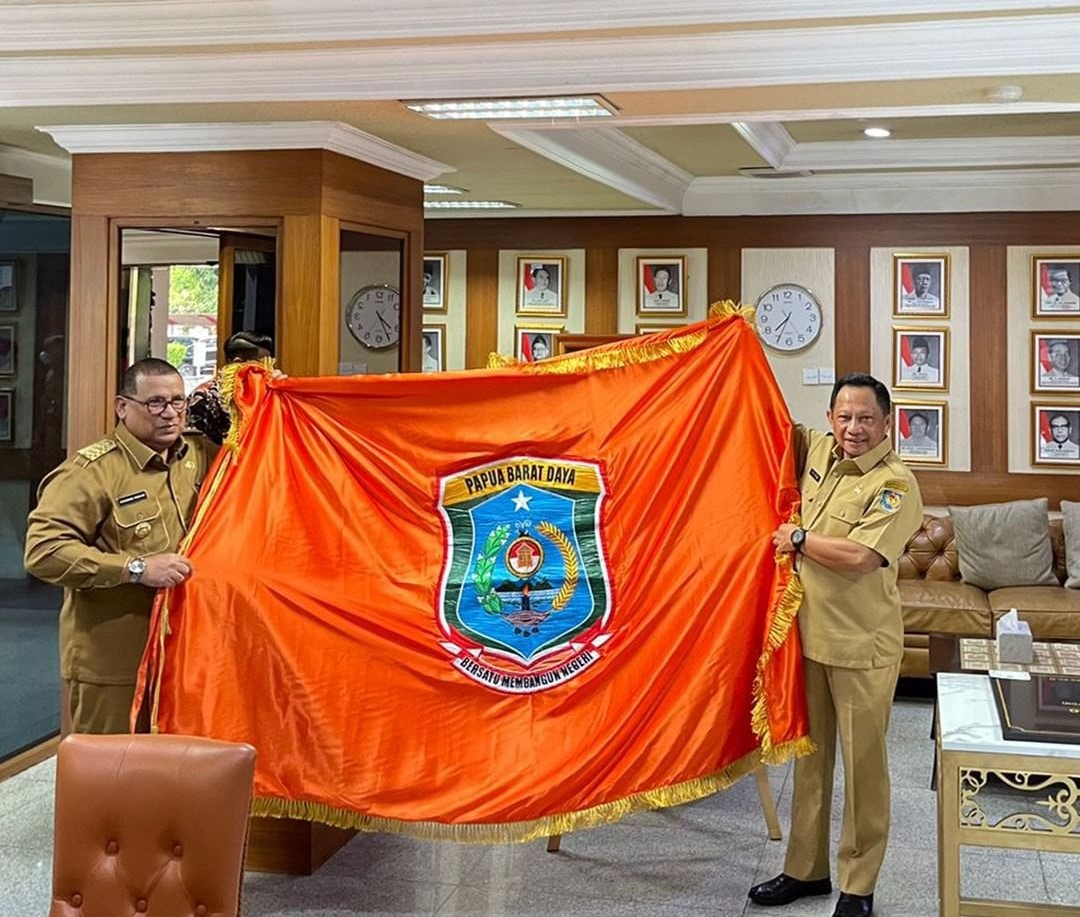
Governor Musaad presents the new flag and emblem in front of Tito Karnavian, the Minister of Home Affair

The expansion in the aforementioned area was plagued by numerous controversies. In Maybrat Regency, a debate erupted over the location of the district capital between Kumurkek and Ayamaru. The people of Aifat supported Kumurkek, while the people of Ayamaru and Aitinyo supported Ayamaru. This tussle over the capital continued until the Constitutional Court intervened in 2013 and declared Ayamaru as the official capital. Despite this decision, community divisions persisted, and a meeting was eventually organized between the conflicting parties. In 2019, it was finally agreed that the capital would be relocated to Kumurkek. However, following the transfer, the Ayamaru people expressed their intention to establish the Maybrat Sau Regency and split from the original Maybrat Regency. Tambrauw Regency was also embroiled in controversy when it "borrowed" four districts from Manokwari Regency, with the political motive of facilitating local elections. The move was met with protests from the community, but the Constitutional Court rejected the appeal and upheld the decision in 2013. The residents of Kebar, Amberbaken, Mubrani, and Senopi, who felt that they had been forcibly transferred to Tambrauw, announce a new region called West Manokwari Regency. With the creation of Southwest Papua, the community requested that West Manokwari be removed from the new province since it is geographically and culturally closer to Manokwari than Sorong and is the customary territory of the Arfak tribe. However, this issue was not addressed until the new province was formed.

Southwest Papua was passed into law on 17 November 2022 by the DPR and inaugurated on 9 December 2022 by the Ministry of Home Affairs. On the day of the inauguration, Muhammad Musa'ad was also appointed as acting governor. Article from Antara News reports that the Sorong Special Economic Zone (SEZ) in Southwest Papua is expected to play a vital role in empowering a large number of workers for the sake of boosting regional development.

== Geography ==
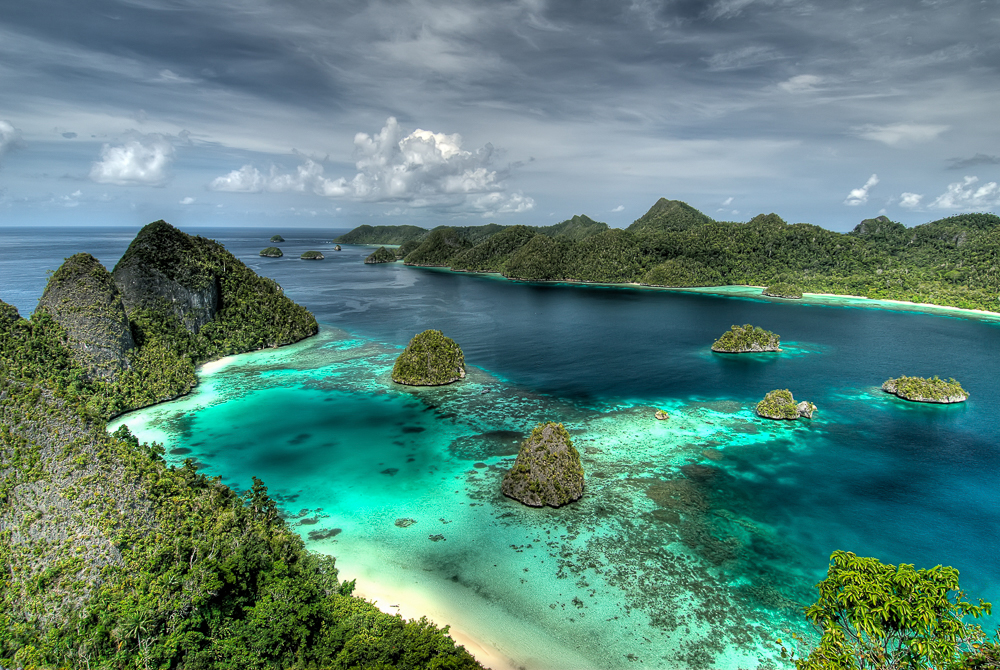
Wayag Islands in Raja Ampat

Southwest Papua, situated in the western expanse of the Bird's Head Peninsula, encompasses diverse topographies ranging from coastal regions to mountainous terrain. Along the southern coast of Sorong and South Sorong Regency, mangrove ecosystems thrive, contributing significantly to the region's biodiversity and ecological resilience. The coastal stretch of South Sorong, in particular, is renowned for hosting one of the largest mangrove and sago forest expanses on Papua Island. Within this rich ecosystem, a plethora of flora and fauna flourish, serving as vital sources of sustenance for local tribes and offering lucrative export commodities. Noteworthy among these are sago palms, mangrove crabs, and shrimp, which contribute to the region's economic vitality and cultural heritage. Although smaller in scale, mangrove areas can also be found in Sorong and Raja Ampat. The mangroves of South Sorong are connected to the river systems originating from upstream regions, notably from the Ayamaru highland area situated in the heart of the Bird's Head Peninsula. This highland expanse, nestled within Maybrat Regency, is characterized by its karst or limestone formations, reaching elevations of approximately 350 meters above sea level. At the heart of the Ayamaru plateau lies Lake Ayamaru, renowned for its crystalline waters tinted with a mesmerizing blue-green hue, a result of dissolved karst rocks. This lake serves as a habitat for a variety of unique species, including the Boeseman's rainbowfish (Melanotaenia boesemani), an endemic fish species to the region. The Terumbu Karang Sehat Indonesia coral-reef programme implemented by Konservasi Indonesia includes activities in the Bird's Head Seascape in Southwest Papua.

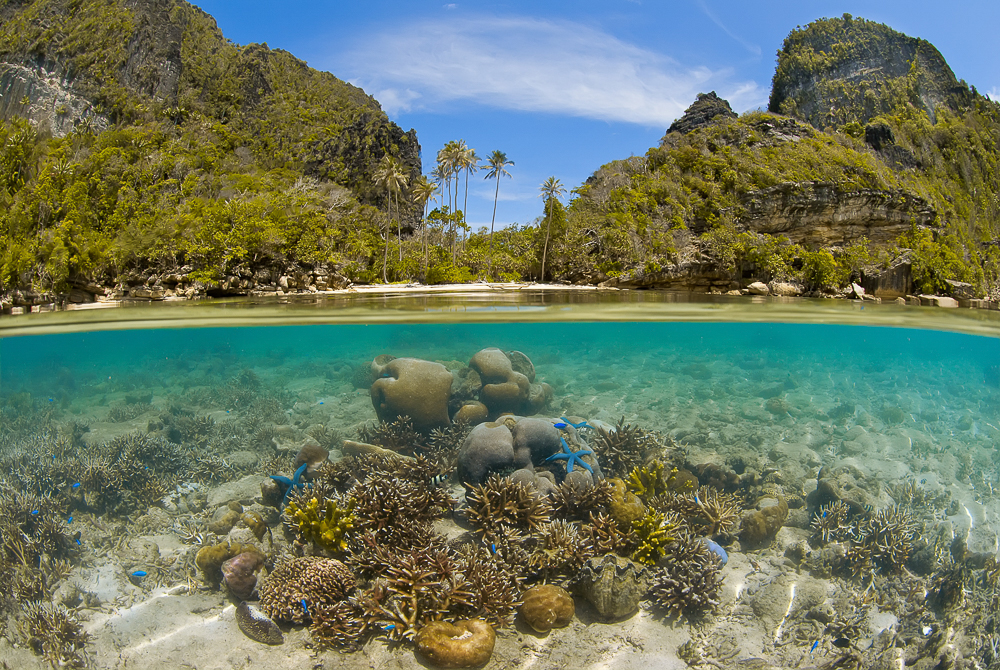
Coral reef in Raja Ampat

The western region of Southwest Papua consists of the Raja Ampat Islands, an archipelago comprising islands such as Waigeo, Salawati, Misool, and Batanta, among others. Raja Ampat contains unique geological formations, with islands like Wayag Island characterized by karst landscapes featuring steep-walled hills. Raja Ampat's natural features have earned it global recognition, culminating in its designation as a UNESCO Global Geopark in Indonesia. The surrounding seas of Raja Ampat are renowned for its biodiversity, containing some of the world's richest coral reef ecosystems. These waters host an array of marine life, including over 500 species of coral, 1,400 species of coral reef fish, and 600 species of mollusks. In the northern part of Raja Ampat lie the Ayau Islands, distinguished by their atoll formations.

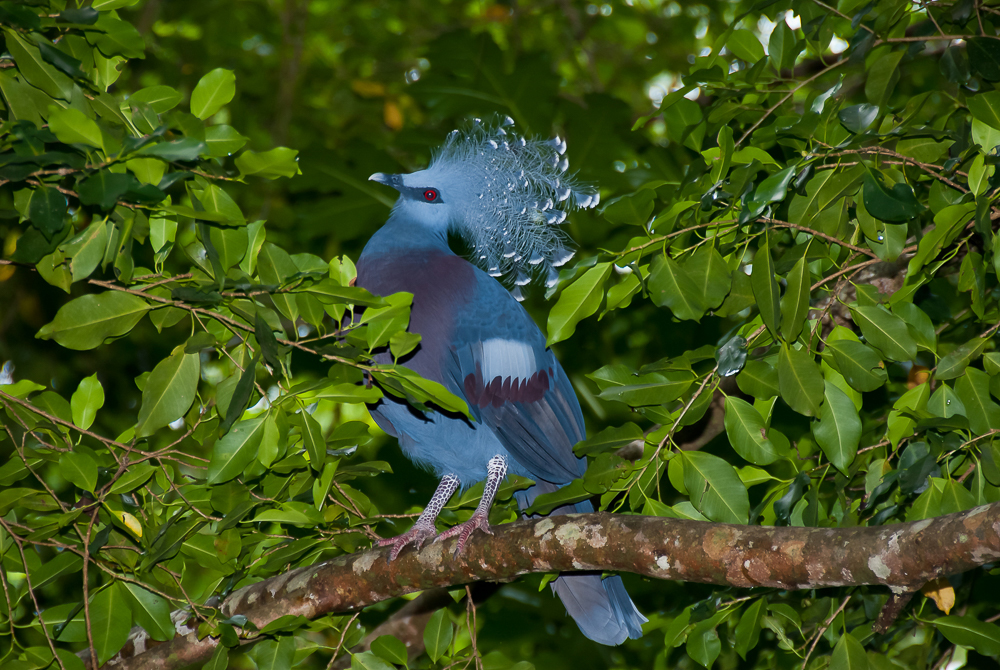
Crowned pigeon in Bird's Head Peninsula

The northern expanse of Southwest Papua is dominated by the Tambrauw Mountains, spanning across Tambrauw Regency. Notably, Tambrauw has been designated as a Conservation Regency, with a remarkable 80 percent of its forests safeguarded within protected areas. Nestled amidst these mountains lies the expansive Kebar Valley, home to the indigenous Mpur people. The Kebar Valley is characterized by vast grasslands and a diverse array of wildlife including the bird-of-paradise, crowned pigeon and tree kangaroos. Tambrauw Regency also has a wide coastline. This coastal area is also designated as a conservation area, namely the Jeen Womom Coastal Park. Jeen Womom has an area of 32 thousand hectares and its fauna include the large leatherback turtle.

== Government and administrative divisions ==
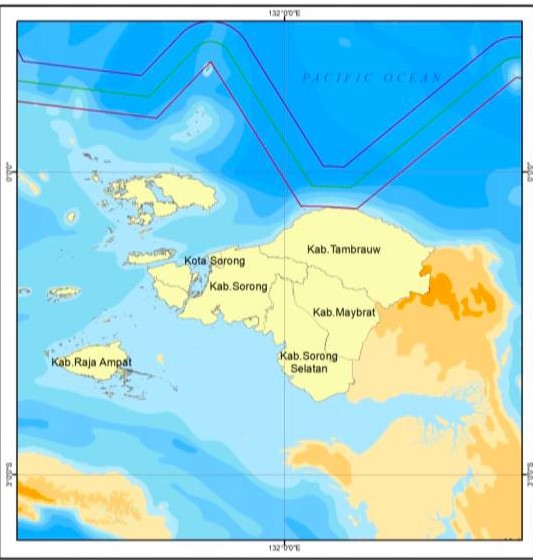
Administrative Map of Southwest Papua Province

The province consists of five regencies (kabupaten) and the autonomous City of Sorong, which has the same status as a regency. The areas and populations as at the 2010 and 2020 Censuses, together with the official estimates as at mid 2025, are tabulated below:

Kode Wilayah	Name of city or regency	Capital	Area in km^{2}	Pop'n Census 2010	Pop'n Census 2020	Pop'n estimate mid-2025	No. of districts	No. of villages	HDI 2023 estimate
92.71	Sorong City		205.26	190,625	284,410	302,452	10	41	0.797 (High)
92.01	Sorong Regency	Aimas	7,564.65	70,619	118,679	124,207	30	252	0.675 (Medium)
92.04	South Sorong Regency	Teminabuan	6,570.23	37,900	52,469	57,297	15	123	0.639 (Medium)
92.05	Raja Ampat Regency	Waisai	7,442.31	42,507	64,141	71,605	24	121	0.653 (Medium)
92.09	Tambrauw Regency	Fef	11,954.82	6,144	28,379	32,070	29	218	0.556 (Medium)
92.10	Maybrat Regency	Aifat	5,385.68	33,081	42,991	48,803	24	260	0.613 (Medium)
Totals			39,122.95	380,876	591,069	636,434	132	1,015	

On 25 October 2013 the People's Representative Council began reviewing draft laws on the establishment of 57 prospective regencies/cities (and 8 new provinces). This included a new province of Southwest Papua to be created out of the existing West Papua province, together with five additional regencies to be formed within the new Southwest Papua Province – the intended new regencies to be Malamoi and Maybrat Sau (both to be cut out of Sorong Regency), Imekko (from South Sorong Regency), North Raja Ampat and South Raja Ampat (both from Raja Ampat Regency). Except for the creation of the new province of Southwest Papua, these projected changes have not yet (by 2025) been implemented.

The province now forms one of Indonesia's 84 national electoral districts to elect members to the People's Representative Council. The Southwest Papua Electoral District consists of all of the 5 regencies in the province, together with the city of Sorong, and elects 3 members to the People's Representative Council.

== Demographics ==
Historical population
Year	Pop.	±%
1971	106,713	—
1980	134,833	+26.4%
1990	199,085	+47.7%
2000	276,732	+39.0%
2010	380,876	+37.6%
2020	591,069	+55.2%
2025	636,434	+7.7%
Source: Statistics Indonesia 2026 and earlier. Southwest Papua was part of West Papua Province until 2022.

Southwest Papua had a population of 591,617 at the 2020 census, while the official estimate as at the middle of 2025 was 645,544, making it the third least populous province in Indonesia, after South Papua and West Papua.

=== Religion ===
Religion in Southwest Papua (2022)
1. Christianity (61.6%)
2. Islam (38.2%)
3. Hinduism (0.10%)
4. Buddhism (0.10%)
5. Confucianism and Others (0.01%)

The majority of the population of Southwest Papua are Protestant. According to data Directorate General of Population and Civil Registration, 61.65% of the population is Christian, with 54.5% adhering to Protestantism and 7.16% adhering to Catholicism, Islam is followed by 38.14% of the population, 0.1% adheres to Hinduism and another 0.1% Buddhism.

Islam had been present in the coastal region of Papua because of its past relationship with Bacan, Ternate, and Tidore sultanates. Based on family account of Abdullah Arfan, the dynasty of Salawati Kingdom, mentioned in the 16th century the first Papuan Muslim was Kalewan who married Siti Hawa Farouk, a muballighah from Cirebon, and changed his name to Bayajid who became the ancestor of Arfan clan.

=== Ethnic groups ===
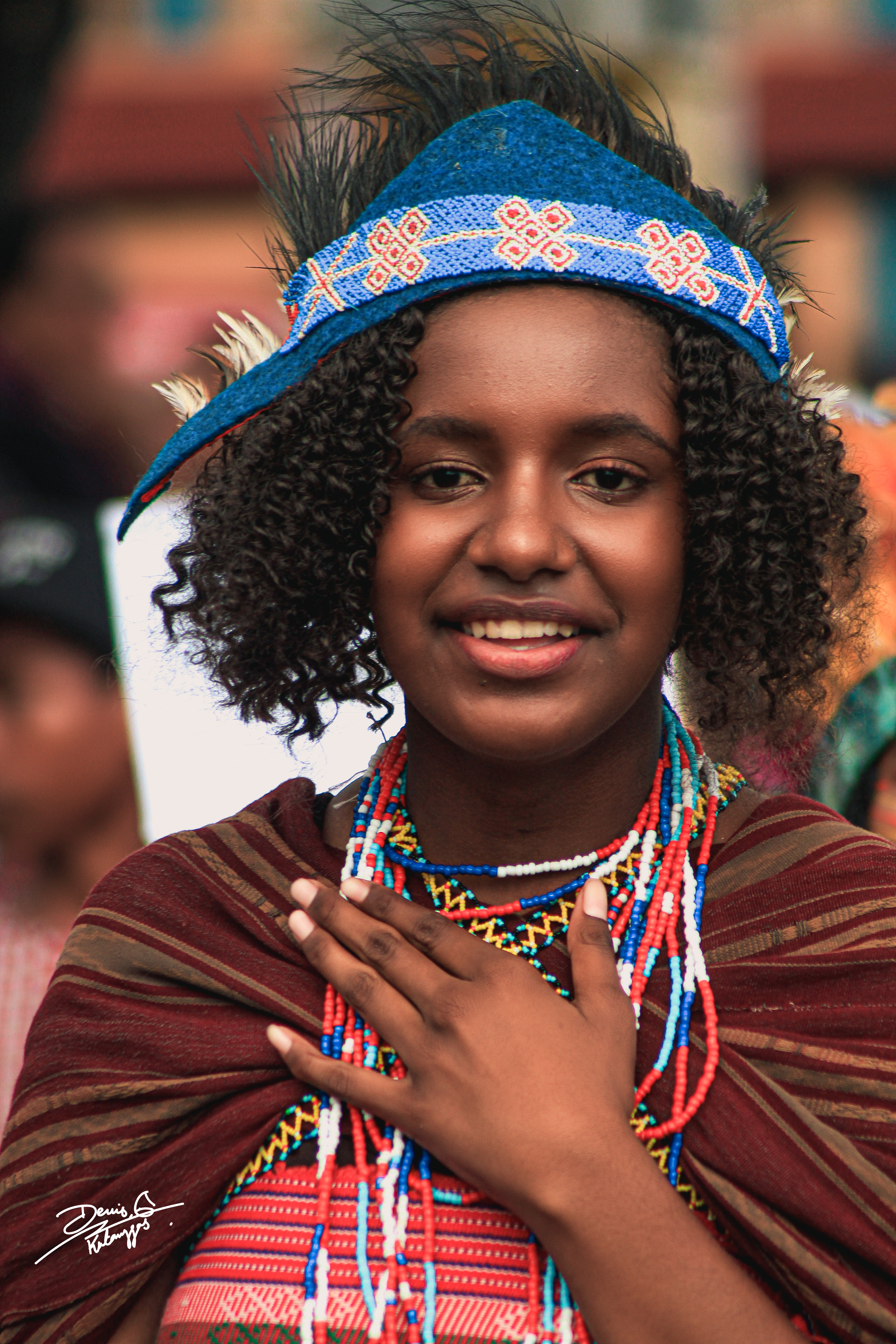
An Ayamaru woman, an indigenous people of Southwest Papua

Southwest Papua has diversity in ethnic groups in the area. Southwest Papua itself is included in the Doberai or Domberai customary territory which consists of 52 ethnic groups. For example, the Moi people or Malamoi who are some of the original inhabitants of Sorong City and Sorong Regency, and Maybrat people with various ethnic sub-groups such as the Ayamaru, Aitinyo, Aifat, Karon, and Mare who come from the regencies of Maybrat and South Sorong. A number of notable figures come from the Ayamaru people, including the Indonesian footballers Boaz Solossa and Ricky Kambuaya. The other ethnic groups are the coastal Ma'ya, the ethnicity of the 'Four Kings' and the migrants Biak groups (Aimando, Beser/Betew, Kafdaron, Biak-Karon/Bikar, Usba, Wardo) from Biak Islands, and indigenous groups like Matbat, Kawe, Biga, Matlow, and Amber living in the inland of Raja Ampat Islands. Abun, Miyah, Ireres, and Mpur in Tambrauw Regency; Tehit in South Sorong; and Imekko people of South Sorong with various sub-ethnic groups, such as Inanwatan, Metemani, Kais, and Kokoda, the majority of which is divided between Muslims and Christians almost evenly. Other small ethnic groups include Duriankari in the Central Salawati district, Awee-Mareno in the districts of North Kokoda and Kais, Gebe (Gag) on the Gag Island, Wayer in the districts of Moswaren and Wayer, Fkour in the Fokour district, Imu in North Kokoda district, and Nakin Onim Sefa in Kais Darat district.

=== Languages ===
The people of Southwest Papua also have a variety of regional languages, while Papuan Malay is the lingua franca in this area. Based on language map data published by the Language Development and Fostering Agency within the Ministry of Education, Culture, Research, and Technology, there are at least 46 regional languages spoken by the people of Southwest Papua Province. In Sorong City, there is Yamueti. In Maybrat Regency, there are Ayamaru, Kambran, Maisomara, and Pokoro. In Raja Ampat Regency, there are Ambel, Batanta, Beser, Beser-Swaimbon, Gebe, Matbat, Matlow, Ma'ya, Ma'ya Laganyan-Kawei, Salafen Matbat, Samate, Selegof, Tepin, and Wardo. In Sorong Regency, there are As, Efpan, Esaro, Kalabra, Moi Sigin, Moraid, Palamul, Seget, and Waliam. In South Sorong Regency, there are Awe, Fkour, Imiyan, Kais, Kokoda, Puragi-Saga, Salkma, Tehit, Tehit Dit, Yaben, and Yahadian-Mugim. In Tambrauw Regency, there are Abun, Abun Gii, Abun Ji, Irires, Karon, Mpur, and Mpur Pantai.

== Education ==
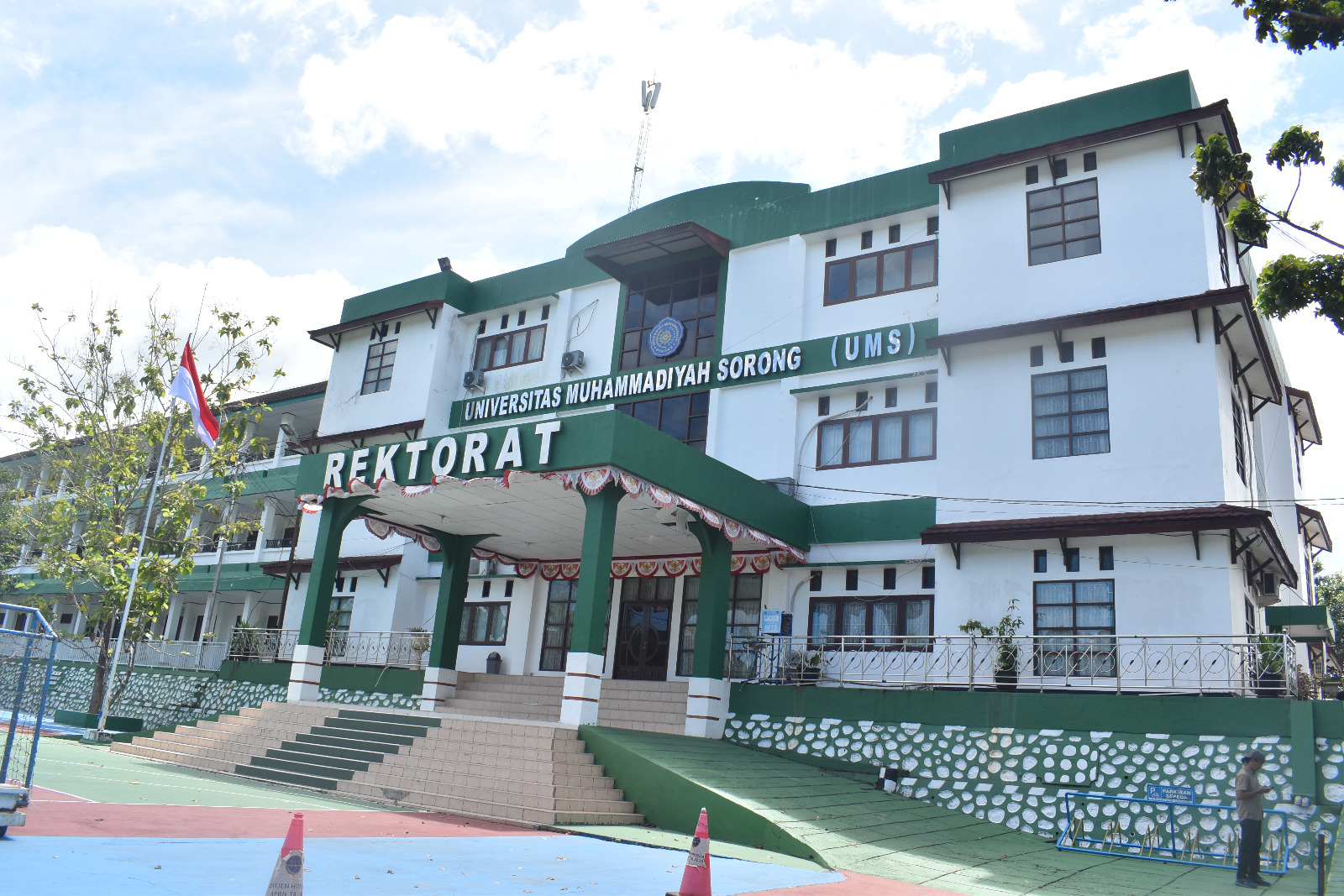
Universitas Muhammadiyah Sorong, a private Islamic university

=== Higher education ===
The province has many universities, both public and private, among others:

==== Public ====
- University of Papua (UNIPA)
  - Campus II Sorong- Faculty of Medicine
  - Campus III Raja Ampat – D3 Ecotourism Study Programme
  - Sausapor Tambrauw Campus – D3 Forest Resources Conservation Study Programme
- Sorong State Islamic Institute (IAIN Sorong)
- Health Polytechnic of the Ministry of Health Sorong (Poltekkes Kemenkes Sorong)
- Sorong Shipping Polytechnic (Poltekpel Sorong)
- Sorong Marine and Fisheries Polytechnic

==== Private ====
- Muhammadiyah University of Sorong (UNAMIN) – formerly Al-Amin University
- University of Education Muhammadiyah Sorong (UNIMUDA)
- University of Victory Sorong (UNVIC)
- Papua Christian University (UKIP)
- Saint Paul Catholic Polytechnic Sorong

=== Secondary school ===
The institution SMA Averos Kota Sorong is located in Southwest Papua. As per the College Entrance Test Institute (LTMPT), this school secured the highest position among all the schools in Papua Island based on the 2022 Computer-Based Written Examination. In that year, only two schools from Papua managed to make it to the top 1000, with SMA Averos ranked 570 out of all the schools in Indonesia.

== Economy ==
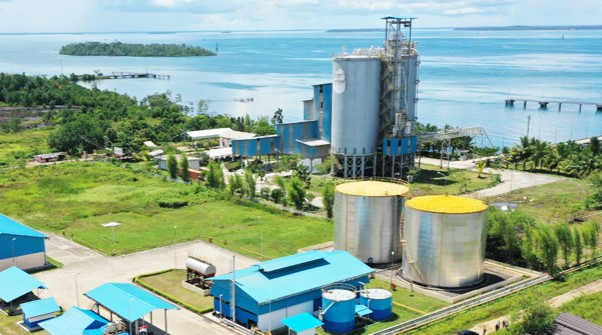
Sorong Special Economic Zone

Sorong, situated in Southwest Papua, holds immense promise owing to its strategic positioning along the trade routes connecting the Asia-Pacific and Australia. Recognizing its potential, the central government took initiative in 2016 by establishing the Sorong Special Economic Zone (SEZ), encompassing an expansive area of 523.7 hectares. The vision for the Sorong SEZ was ambitious, aiming to catalyze economic development across Papua by fostering a diverse array of industries. These included nickel mining, palm oil production, and the processing of other forestry products, leveraging the region's rich natural resources. However, despite initial enthusiasm and governmental support, the Sorong SEZ has encountered challenges. Chief among them is the tepid response from potential investors, which has cast doubt on the project's viability. Consequently, there are concerns that the SEZ status of Sorong may be at risk of being revoked due to the lack of investor interest.

=== Mining ===
Southwest Papua emerges as a hub of significant mining potential, particularly in the domains of petroleum, natural gas, and nickel. Notably, the state-owned corporation Pertamina EP Cepu undertakes oil and gas drilling operations across various locales within Sorong Regency, including Salawati, Sele Linda, and Klamono. In a concerted effort to capitalize on these resources, Pertamina, via its subsidiary PT Kilang Pertamina Internasional Unit VII Kasim, has established an oil refinery. This refinery serves to process oil extracted from Salawati and Sele Linda, contributing to the region's energy infrastructure and economic growth. Additionally, Petrogas (Basin) Ltd., a Singapore-based company, operates within Southwest Papua, with facilities located in Kasim and Arar. Petrogas engages in crude oil extraction from fields such as Walio and Matoa, channeling the extracted resources to Pertamina's refinery in Kasim. Furthermore, the facility in Arar plays a pivotal role in gas production, serving as a fuel source for the power plant situated in Sorong.

Gag Island within the Raja Ampat archipelago, represents a focal point for nickel mining endeavors. Managed by PT Gag Nickel, a subsidiary of Antam, this small island holds significant nickel potential. In addition to Gag Island, neighboring small islands such as Kawe Island and Manuran Island also feature nickel mining activities.

=== Forestry ===
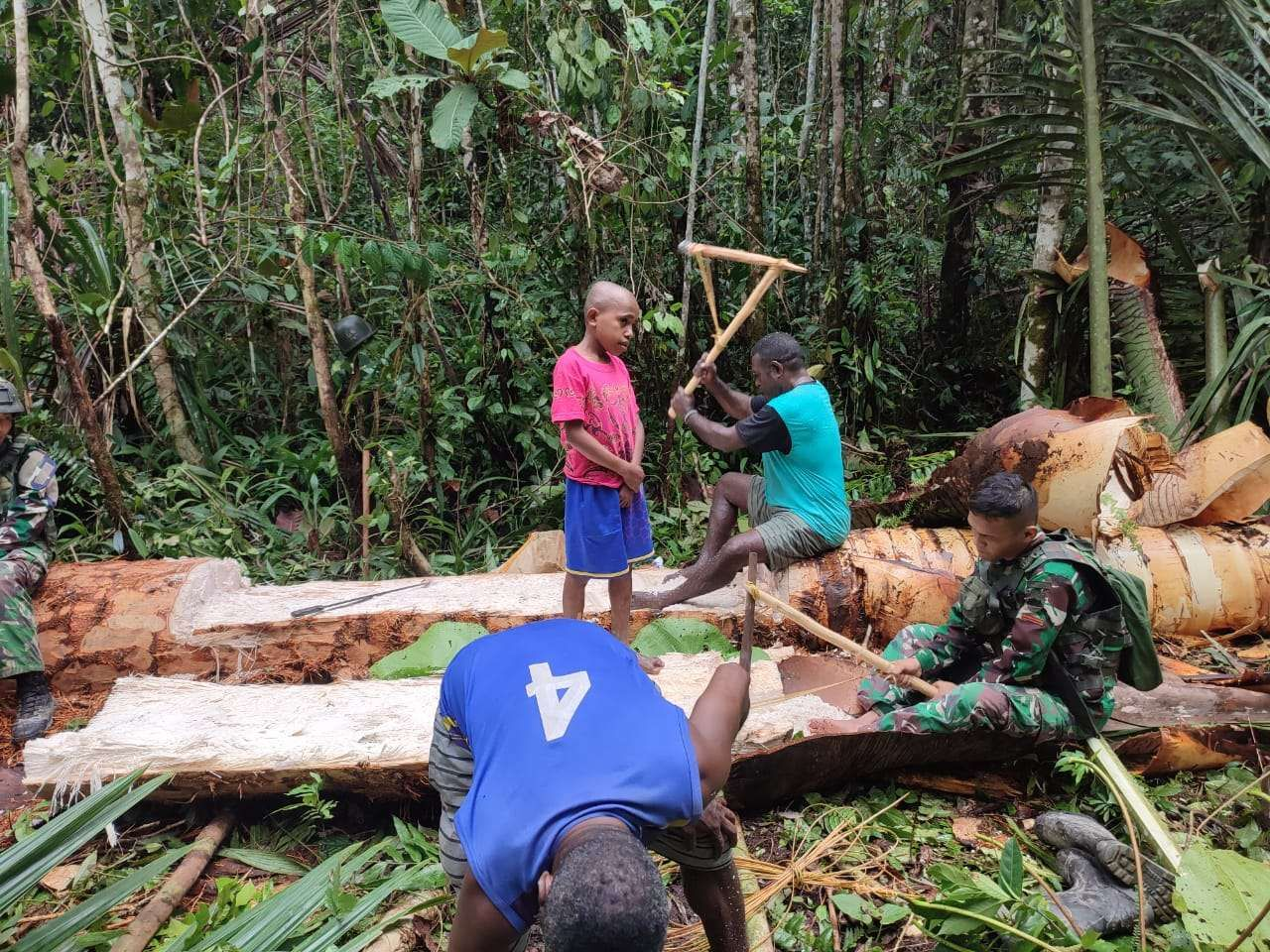
Sago harvesting using traditional method

Sorong Regency has tens of thousands of hectares of palm oil plantations managed by four companies in Salawati, Klamono and Segun. However, the land was returned to the Moi tribal community due to licensing violations so the company's permit was revoked.

South Sorong Regency boasts significant sago potential, offering a valuable resource for both traditional culinary practices and industrial-scale production. Sago flour, derived from processed sago, holds promise as a commodity of industrial significance. One prominent player in this sector is PT Austindo Nusantara Jaya Agri Papua (ANJAP), a sizable company with a sago forest concession spanning approximately 40 thousand hectares in Matemani District. Notably, 10 thousand hectares within this concession are designated as conservation areas. PT ANJAP, a subsidiary of PT ANJ engaged in the palm oil industry, operates in a manner distinct from oil palm plantations. Rather than extensively altering the landscape, PT ANJAP focuses on harnessing naturally occurring sago from swamps and wet peatlands. Furthermore, Perhutani, a state-owned forestry enterprise, has also invested in sago production, establishing a sago factory in Kais District. This initiative is supported by a sago forest concession covering an area of 16 thousand hectares.

== Tourism ==
=== Raja Ampat Islands ===
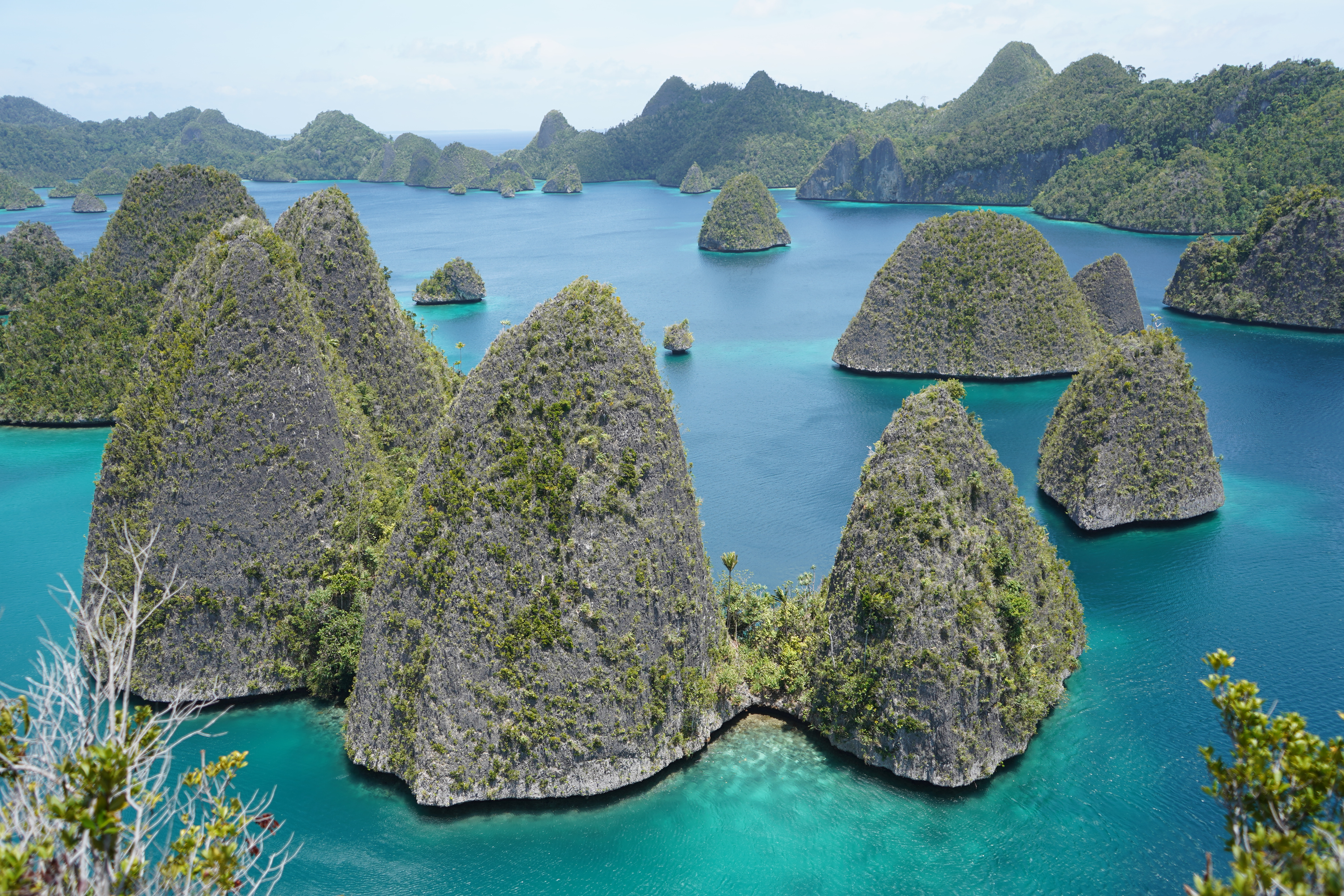
Wajag Island, Raja Ampat Islands

The Raja Ampat Islands are a series of four adjacent island clusters located in the western part of the Bird's Head (Vogelkoop) of Papua Island. Administratively, this cluster is mainly under Raja Ampat Regency, Southwest Papua Province (except for two districts which lie within the Sorong Regency). These islands are now a destination for divers who are interested in the underwater scenery. The island group is named after the four kings, who used to rule the islands of Waigeo, Misool, Salawati, and Batanta.

=== Tambrauw Conservation Regency ===
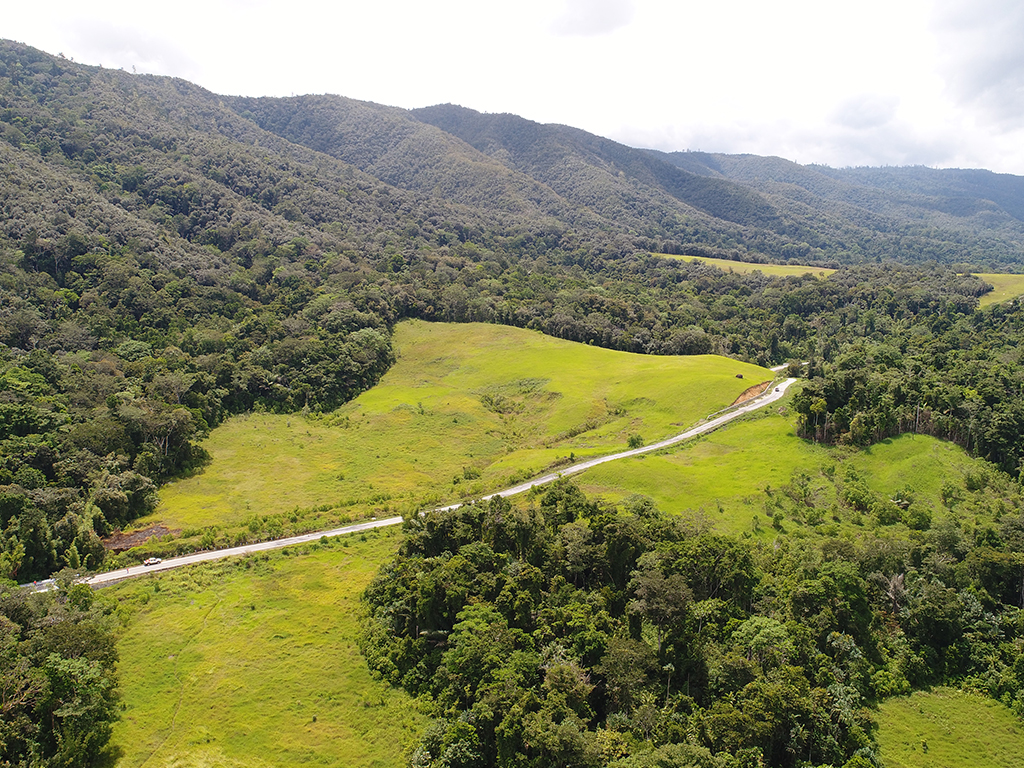
Kebar valley in Tambrauw

The Regent of Tambrauw declared Tambrauw Regency as a Conservation Regency through a Regional Regulation in 2018. Most of Tambrauw's territory consists of conservation forests, protected forests, and coastal areas with a variety of protected flora and fauna. Indigenous people with their traditional culture play an important role in maintaining the conservation area. Some protected areas in Tambrauw include North Tambrauw Nature Reserve, South Tambrauw Nature Reserve, Sausapor Beach Nature Reserve, and Jeen Womom Coastal Park. Tambrauw has great ecotourism potential. One of them is as a birdwatching destination. Birds that can be found in Tambrauw include cenderawasih, mambruk, cockatoo, nuri and cassowary. Other fauna in Tambrauw include wallabies, tree kangaroos, cuscuses and leatherback turtles.

=== Cultural festivals ===
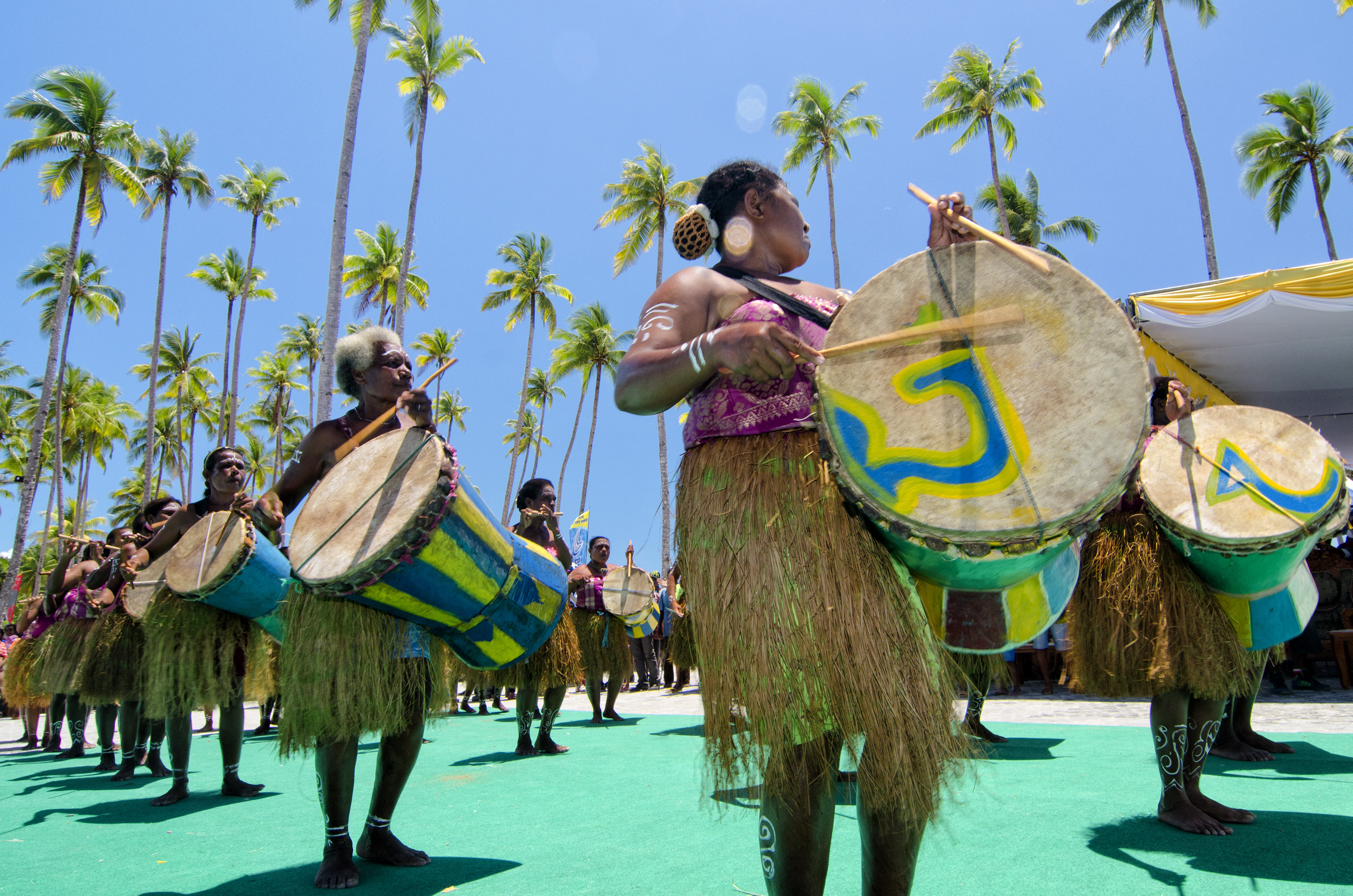
Suling Tambur performance

Suling tambur is a traditional dance art practiced by the people of Raja Ampat. Central to this performance are two distinct musical instruments: the flute, suling, and the large tifa, tambur. Traditionally, these dances were reserved for special occasions such as weddings and traditional festivities, where groups of performers would come together to entertain and celebrate. The drum, originally crafted from skins of stingray, magewang, or other shark species, has evolved over time, with modern iterations now utilizing goat or deer skin. Similarly, the flute, an integral component of the ensemble, is traditionally fashioned from bamboo, lending its unique timbre to the musical accompaniment. In recent years, the suling tambur has become a symbol of festivity and cultural pride, extending its presence to larger events beyond traditional gatherings. The Raja Ampat Regency Government has taken proactive steps to preserve and promote this cherished cultural heritage by organizing the Suling Tambur Festival annually since 2017.
