= Batta language =

Austronesian language spoken in West Papua

Batta
- Batanta
- Native to: Indonesia
- Region: Batanta
- Native speakers: 150 (2024)
- Language family: Austronesian: Malayo-Polynesian; Central–Eastern Malayo-Polynesian; Eastern Malayo-Polynesian; South Halmahera–West New Guinea; Raja Ampat–South Halmahera; Raja Ampat; Nuclear Raja Ampat; Ma'ya-Salawati; Salawati-Batta; Batta

Language codes
- ISO 639-3: –
- Glottolog: bata1295
- ELP: 10990
- Location of Batanta Island, Batta is spoken in the southern part of this island.
- Coordinates: 0.86°S 130.65°E

Batta (Batanta) is an Austronesian language spoken in Batanta Island, one of the Raja Ampat Islands. According to local history, some Batta speakers originated in the interior of the island, but were brought to the coast by Manarmakeri, a local influential figure.

This language is critically endangered, as only people aged around 40 and above speak it on a daily basis.
