= Misool =

Island in Indonesia

- Location in Raja Ampat Islands Location in Papua

Geography
- Location: Oceania
- Coordinates: 1°53′41″S 130°5′1″E
- Archipelago: Raja Ampat Islands
- Area: 2,034 km^{2} (785 sq mi)
- Area rank: 205
- Highest elevation: 561 m (1841 ft)

Administration
- Indonesia
- Province: Southwest Papua

Demographics
- Ethnic groups: Ma'ya, Matbat, Matlow, Biga (native); Biak, Moluccans, and others

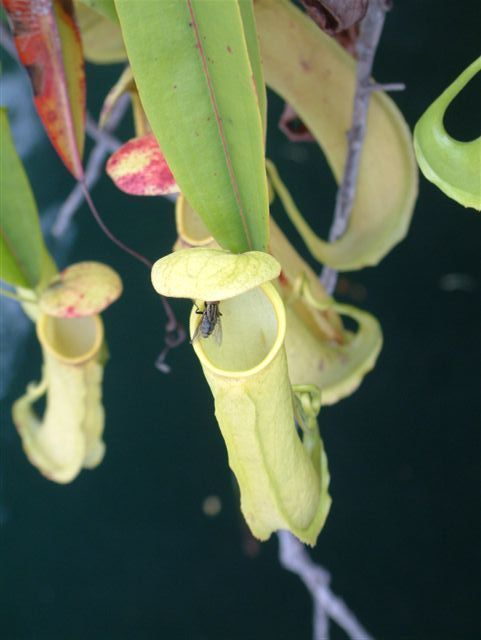
Aerial traps of the pitcher plant Nepenthes sp. Misool

Misool (Indonesian: Pulau Misool; Matbat: Batan Mee; Dutch: Misool-eiland), formerly spelled Mysol or Misol, is one of the four major islands in the Raja Ampat Islands in Southwest Papua, Indonesia. Its land area is 2,034 km^{2}, although with surrounding smaller islands, including Kofiau Island and the Boo Islands to the northwest of Misool and the Sembilan Islands (which lie equidistant between Misool, Kofiau and Salawati) to the north, this rises to over 2,440 km^{2}. The highest point is 561 m and the main towns are Waigama, located on the island's northwest coast, and Lilinta on the island's southeast coast.

The inhabitants speak the Ma'ya, Biga, and Matbat languages, as well as Indonesian and a variety of the Malay-based creole, namely Papuan Malay.

Other main islands of this group off the western end of Southwest Papua are Salawati, Batanta, and Waigeo, and there are numerous smaller islands such as Kofiau.

== Etymology ==
The name Misool is from the Ma'ya language which meant "port" or "harbour", relating to when the first king from Waigeo arrived on the island. The original inhabitants (Matbat) called the island by the name Batan Mee.

== History ==
Islam first arrived in the Raja Ampat Islands in the 15th century due to political and economic contacts with the Bacan Sultanate. During the 16th and 17th centuries, the Sultanate of Tidore had close economic ties with the island of Misool, which was ruled by king in Lilinta descended from Gurabesi of Waigeo, while Tidore appointed another king in Waigama. During this period, Islam became firmly established and local chiefs had begun adopting Islam.

Misool was a part of the Dutch colonial empire under the Netherlands East Indies administration. The Japanese occupied the island in 1942, became the base of Imperial Japanese Navy until 1945.

== Administration ==
The southern part of the Raja Ampat Islands is divided into the following administrative districts (distrik). This includes Kofiau Island, the Boo Islands and the Sembilan Islands (Kepulauan Sembilan), all of which are considered part of the southern section of Raja Ampat.

Kode Kemendagri	Name of District (distrik)	Land area in km^{2}	Pop'n Census 2010	Pop'n Census 2020	Pop'n Estimate mid 2025	Admin centre	No. of villages	No. of islands	Post code	Villages
92.05.13	Misool Selatan (South Misool)	91.16	3,026	3,504	4,079	Dabatan	5	295	98485	Dabatan, Fafanlap, Harapan Jaya, Usaha Jaya, Yellu
92.05.16	Misool Barat (West Misool)	336.84	1,291	1,498	2,072	Lilinta	5	79	98484	Biga, Gamta, Kapatcol, Lilinta, Magey
92.05.01	Misool (or Misool Utara)	1,235.68	1,761	2,017	2,788	Salafen	5	38	98483	Aduwei, Atkari, Salafen, Solal, Waigama
92.05.10	Kofiau ^{(a)}	206.23	2,520	2,599	2,975	Mikiran	5	29	98482	Awat, Deer, DibalaI, Mikiran, Tolobi
92.05.06	Misool Timur (East Misool)	553.66	2,651	2,835	3,146	Folley	6	136	98486	Audam, Folley, Limalas Barat, Limalas Timur, Tomolol, Usaha Jaya
92.05.17	Kepulauan Sembilan (Sembilan Islands)	17.21	1,458	1,458	1,660	Weijim Barat	4	16	98481	Pulau Tikus, Satukurano, Wejim Barat, Wejim Timur
	Total Raja Ampat Selatan	2,440.78	12,707	13,911	16,720		30	593		

Notes: (a) including the Boo Islands.

== Ecology ==
=== Terrestrial ===
Misool is part of the Vogelkop–Aru lowland rain forests ecoregion, which includes the other Raja Ampat Islands and the Bird's Head Peninsula on mainland New Guinea. Plant communities include alluvial, or lowland alluvial rain forest and lowland hill rain forest. Native animals include marsupials, murid rodents, bats, and many birds, including several endemic species. Some native animals include:

- Echymipera kalubu, common spiny bandicoot
- Echymipera rufescens
- Dorcopsis muelleri
- Phalanger orientalis
- Spilocuscus maculatus
- Petaurus breviceps
- Macroglossus minimus
- Nyctimene aello
- Pteropus conspicillatus
- Aselliscus tricuspidatus
- Pipistrellus papuanus
- Lesser bird-of-paradise (Paradisaea minor)

=== Aquatic ===
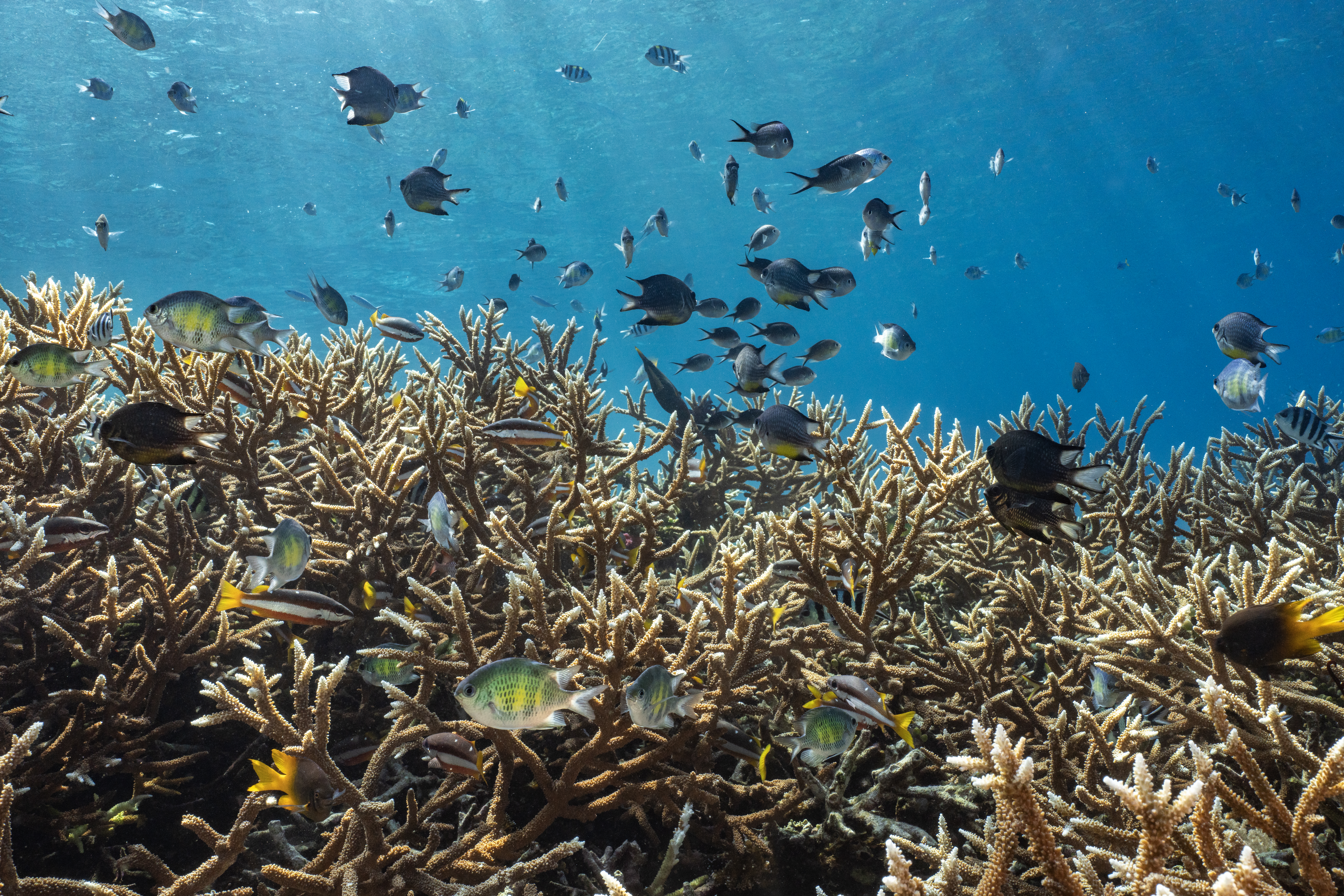
Coral reef ecosystem of Kalig Reef in Misool

Misool and the Raja Ampat Islands are part of the Coral Triangle, and islands' coral reefs and coastal waters are some of the most biodiverse on Earth. A section of Raja Ampat Marine Recreation Park covers the coastal waters southeast of the island. The park was designated in 2009.

Endemic freshwater fish include the Misool rainbowfish (Melanotaenia misoolensis) and Misool yellowfin rainbowfish (Melanotaenia flavipinnis).

== Misool Island Nature Reserve ==
Misool Island Nature Reserve
- Cagar Alam Pulau Misool
- IUCN category Ia (strict nature reserve)
- Interactive map of Misool Island Nature Reserve
- Area: 84,000 ha (320 sq mi)
- Designated: 1982
- Operator: Balai KSDA Maluku

Misool Island Nature Reserve was established in 1982. It covers the southern portion of the island, with an area of 840 km^{2}.
