= Raja Ampat–South Halmahera languages =

Branch of Malayo-Polynesian languages

Raja Ampat–South Halmahera
- Halmahera Sea
- Geographic distribution: Halmahera Sea and Raja Ampat Islands
- Linguistic classification: Austronesian: Malayo-Polynesian; Central–Eastern Malayo-Polynesian; Eastern Malayo-Polynesian; South Halmahera–West New Guinea; Raja Ampat–South Halmahera
- Proto-language: Proto-Raja Ampat–South Halmahera (Proto-RASH)
- Subdivisions: Waigeo (Ambel)–As; Ma'ya–Matbat (Nuclear Raja Ampat); South Halmahera

Language codes
- Glottolog: raja1255

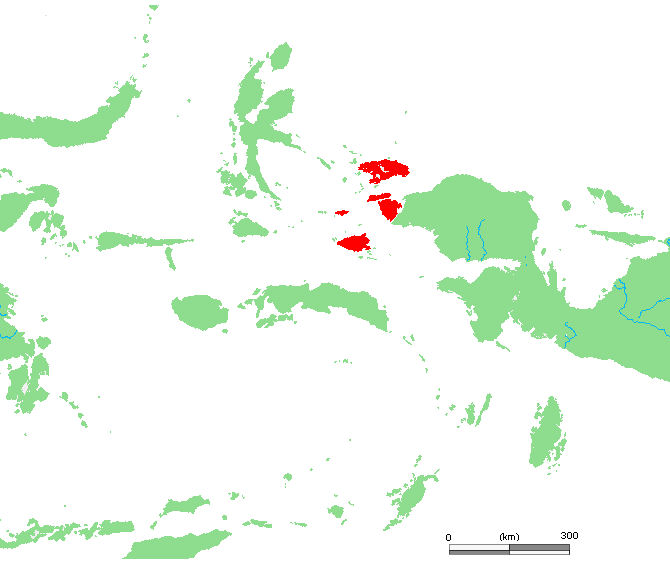

The Raja Ampat–South Halmahera languages are a branch of Malayo-Polynesian languages of eastern Indonesia. They are spoken on islands in the Halmahera Sea, and on its margins from the south-eastern coast of Halmahera to the Raja Ampat Islands off the western tip of New Guinea.

The languages of the Raja Ampat Islands show a strong Papuan substratum influence; it is not clear that they are actually Austronesian as opposed to relexified Papuan languages.

Remijsen (2001) and Blust (1978) linked the languages of Raja Ampat to the South Halmahera languages.

== Historical morphology ==
Reconstructions of subject markers and inalienable possessive markers for Raja Ampat–South Halmahera proto-languages according to Kamholz (2015). Note that V = vocalic conjugation, C = consonantal conjugation:

Proto-Raja Ampat–South Halmahera:

| 1sg. | *k-, *y- (V), *k-, *-y- (C) | 1pl. | *t- (incl.), *am- (excl.) |
| 2sg. | *my- (V), *m-y- (C) | 2pl. | *m- |
| 3sg. | *n- (V), *n- (C) | 3pl. | *d- |

| 1sg. | *-g | 1pl. | *-nd (incl.), *-mam (excl.) |
| 2sg. | *-m | 2pl. | *-meu |
| 3sg. | *-∅ | 3pl. | *-ndri, *si- |

Proto-Ma'ya-Matbat:

| 1sg. | *k-, *y- (V), *k-, *-y- (C) | 1pl. | *t- (incl.), *m-? (excl.) |
| 2sg. | *my- (V), *m-y- (C) | 2pl. | *m- |
| 3sg. | *n- (V), *n- (C) | 3pl. | ? |

| 1sg. | *-g | 1pl. | *-n (incl.), *-m (excl.) |
| 2sg. | *-m | 2pl. | *-m |
| 3sg. | *-∅ | 3pl. | *-n |

Subject markers and personal pronouns of Proto-Raja Ampat–South Halmahera according to Arnold (2023):

| 1sg. | *-y- | 1pl. | *t- (incl.), *am- (excl.) |
| 2sg. | *m-y- | 2pl. | *m- |
| 3sg. | *n- | 3pl. | *l- |

| 1sg. | *yak | 1pl. | *tit (incl.), *am (excl.) |
| 2sg. | *aw | 2pl. | *mew |
| 3sg. | *i | 3pl. | *si |

== Languages ==
From Kamholz (2024). The earlier classification in Kamholz (2014) grouped Ambel and Biga together, but the innovation posited for Proto-Ambel-Biga (innovation of the inalienable possessive plural suffix -n/-no) did not in fact exist:

- Raja Ampat–South Halmahera
  - Waigeo (Ambel)
  - Biga
  - Batta
  - Salawati
  - As
  - Ma'ya-Matbat
    - Ma'ya
    - Matbat
  - South Halmahera (see more)

Laura Arnold (2024) presents a revised classification, placing Biga within Ma'ya and unifying all Raja Ampat languages into a branch with two subgroups, one containing most Raja Ampat languages into a Nuclear Raja Ampat subgroup and the other containing Ambel and As.

- Raja Ampat–South Halmahera
  - Raja Ampat
    - Ambel-As
      - Waigeo (Ambel)
      - As
    - Nuclear Raja Ampat (= Ma'ya-Matbat)
      - Matbat
      - Ma'ya-Salawati
        - Ma'ya
        - Salawati-Batta
          - Batta
          - Salawati
  - South Halmahera (see more)

== Lexical reconstructions ==
Reconstruction of lexemes found in Proto-Raja Ampat–South Halmahera according to Arnold (2020, 2025):

| Proto-RASH | Gloss |
|---|---|
| *tela | 'banana' |
| *fa- | 'causative prefix' |
| *fi | 'good' |
| *su | 'fart' |
| *-opak | 'to fly' |
| *boe | 'to give' |
| *kuita | 'octopus' |
| *wu | 'rainbow' |
| *du | 'rattan' |
| *lu | 'two' |
| *pnu | 'village' |
| *mora | 'wind' |

Reconstruction of lexemes found in Proto-Ma'ya-Salawati according to Arnold (2023, 2024, 2025):

| Proto-Ma'ya-Salawati | Gloss |
|---|---|
| *hayˈwa³n | 'animal' |
| *-sa³ | 'to ascend' |
| *kaˈla¹²p | 'ash' |
| *go³f | 'bamboo' |
| *ˈtala³ | 'banana' |
| *faˈnyi³ | 'bat' |
| *-sʊ³p | 'to bathe' |
| *du¹²w (?) | 'beetle' |
| *ˈnyana³ | 'betel pepper' |
| *ˈmani³ | 'bird' |
| *ˈmete³m | 'black' |
| *ˈlomo³s | 'blood' |
| *maˈla³w | 'blue' |
| *kaˈbo³m | 'bone' |
| *su³s | 'breast' |
| *faˈsi³l (?) | 'to breathe' |
| *saˈsa¹²y (?) | 'broom' |
| *wa³g | 'canoe' |
| *kaˈlo³w | 'cassowary' |
| *fa- | 'causative prefix' |
| *si³f | 'cloth' |
| *mnye³t | 'cloud' |
| *aˈko³p | 'cockatoo' |
| *kaˈliti³f | 'cockroach' |
| *nyu¹²w | 'coconut' |
| *kaˈbluti³ | 'cold' |
| *si¹²w (?) | 'comb' |
| *-bʊ³t | 'to come' |
| *wi¹²f | 'crocodile' |
| *-ˈtini³s | 'to cry' |
| *mo¹²y | 'current' |
| *-ˈale³ | 'to descend' |
| *-ma³t | 'to die' |
| *-maˈnya¹²l | 'to dream' |
| *ˈsili³p | 'drum' |
| *baˈla³ | 'earth' |
| *-aˈpo³n | 'to eat (intr.)' |
| *-a | 'to eat (tr.)' |
| *ˈtolo³ | 'egg' |
| *-su³n | 'to enter' |
| *-ˈsapa³n | 'to exit' |
| *kaˈli³ | 'feces' |
| *la³p | 'fire' |
| *ˈyini³ | 'fish' |
| *ˈwana³t | 'flesh' |
| *-ˈapo³ | 'to fly' |
| *panˈpo³n | 'food' |
| *fo³n | 'full' |
| *-bɪy | 'to give' |
| *kalaˈbe³t | 'goanna' |
| *fi³y | 'good' |
| *maˈna³ | 'grease' |
| *-ˈdono³ | 'to hear' |
| *maˈsyono³ | 'heavy' |
| *haˈba³t (?) | 'to hit' |
| *-bu³n | 'to kill' |
| *ˈfunu³ | 'king' |
| *-un | 'to know' |
| *ˈlʊnʊ³ | 'ladder' |
| *kaˈnya³t | 'land turtle' |
| *kaˈlu¹²w (?) | 'leech' |
| *-ˈene³f | 'to lie down' |
| *maˈla¹²s | 'long' |
| *mʊ³s | 'low tide' |
| *kaˈya³w | 'machete' |
| *ˈmana³ | 'man' |
| *pɪ¹²t | 'moon' |
| *ˈlyama³ | 'needle' |
| *galaˈwa¹²w | 'new' |
| *maˈle³m | 'night' |
| *si³w | 'nine' |
| *kɪ³t | 'octopus' |
| *kaˈte³m | 'one' |
| *ˈpʊsʊ³ | 'paddle' |
| *-ˈbyaya³ | 'to play' |
| *ˈgoli³m | 'rain' |
| *wu¹²w | 'rainbow' |
| *kaˈlu³f | 'rat' |
| *ˈbulu³f | 'raw' |
| *maˈme³ | 'red' |
| *lefˈli³f | 'roof' |
| *ˈwali³ | 'rope' |
| *faˈyow³ | 'rose apple' |
| *-ˈtati³ | 'to run' |
| *bi³y | 'sago' |
| *le³n | 'sand' |
| *binsaˈla¹²y (?) | 'sandfly' |
| *fɪ³n | 'sea turtle' |
| *kaˈwa¹² | 'seaweed' |
| *-ten | 'to share (food)' |
| *ˈwono³m | 'six' |
| *na¹² (?) | 'sky' |
| *ko³k | 'snake' |
| *-fa³n | 'to shoot' |
| *-ˈene³f | 'to sleep' |
| *ˈsulu³ | 'spoon' |
| *kaˈpa³t | 'stone' |
| *tʊ³p | 'sugarcane' |
| *kaˈlene³ | 'taro' |
| *ˈlafe³ | 'ten' |
| *tʊ³l | 'three' |
| *taˈbaka³ | 'tobacco' |
| *taˈmi³ | 'urine' |
| *pnu³w | 'village' |
| *ˈwali³ | 'vine' |
| *-da³g | 'to walk' |
| *kanˈdyɪ³n | 'wall' |
| *ˈwVyV³ | 'water' |
| *-faˈnyo³w | 'to wash' |
| *-faˈba¹²m | 'to wash clothes' |
| *maˈlomo³ | 'wet' |
| *ˈlaba³t | 'wound' |
| *-ma¹²h | 'to yawn' |
