= Gag Island =

Island in Southwest Papua, Indonesia

Coordinates: 0°27′0″S 129°52′0″E

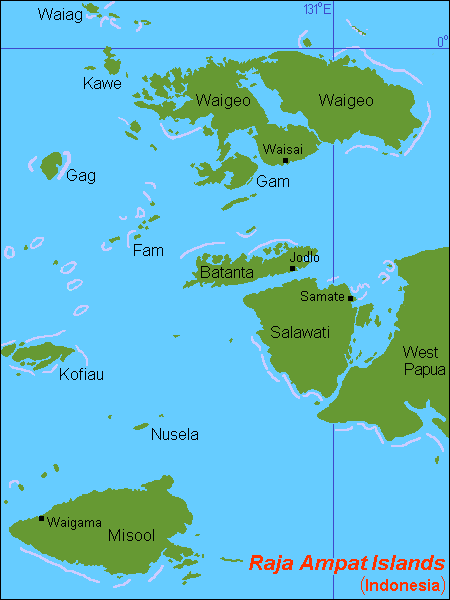
Gag and the Raja Ampat Islands

Gag Island is one of the Raja Ampat Islands in the Indonesian province of Southwest Papua. It is situated some 150 kilometres west of Sorong, the provincial capital.

The island's population is approximately 450 living at Gambier Bay. This community was established in the early 1960s by people moving to the island in the hope of finding work with nickel exploration ventures at that time.

== Demographics ==
The original inhabitants of Gag Island were originally Gebe people who migrated from Gebe Island in the northwest, primarily from the village of Umera. Apart from that, the Kawe people from Waigeo Island and the small islands around it to the east also live here. Because this island is open for nickel mining, the people who live on this island are not only the ethnic groups mentioned above, there are also migrants from Maluku Islands, especially from Seram and Halmahera, then people from Butonese, Makassarese, Javanese, and other indigenous peoples of New Guinea, especially Biak and Ma'ya.

== Economy ==
Gag Island represents one of the largest nickel reserve in Indonesia having estimated reserves of 240 million tonnes of ore grading 1.35% nickel. The 240 million tonnes of ore contains 3.24 million tonnes of nickel metal.

In 1996 the PT Gag Nikel company was formed as a joint venture agreement between BHP (75%) and Indonesia's state-owned mining company, Aneka Tambang (25%). A contract of work was awarded in February 1998, and a program of exploration and preliminary evaluation was conducted. In late 1999, the Government of Indonesia enacted a forestry law prohibiting open cast mining in "protection forest" areas. The forest on Gag Island was subsequently reclassified as "protection forest", stopping any mining activity on the island.

Mining had resumed in Gag since 2017, following an exploration phase.

== Sources ==
- "Working for a Sustainable Future", BHP
