= As language =

Austronesian language

As
- Native to: Indonesia
- Region: Bird's Head Peninsula
- Ethnicity: As
- Native speakers: 5–6 (2020)
- Language family: Austronesian: Malayo-Polynesian; Central–Eastern Malayo-Polynesian; Eastern Malayo-Polynesian; South Halmahera–West New Guinea; Raja Ampat–South Halmahera; Raja Ampat; Ambel–As; As

Language codes
- ISO 639-3: asz
- Glottolog: asss1237
- ELP: As
- Coordinates: 0.75°S 131.73°E

As is an Austronesian language spoken in the village of Asbaken, on the north coast of the Doberai Peninsula, on the Indonesian portion of the island of New Guinea. It was possibly originally spoken on Gag Island.

In 1987, Berry & Berry found approximately 300 speakers of As, but by 2020, Arnold found only six speakers, all elderly. The language is considered moribund as a result, though there is some interest among younger people in documenting the language before it is fully extinct.
