= Matlow people =

Matlow
Misool

Total population
- 8.000 (2007)

Regions with significant populations
- Indonesia (Misool)

Languages
- Matlow, Papuan Malay, and Indonesian

Religion
- Islam (majority)

Related ethnic groups
- Matbat • Biga • Ma'ya

The Matlow people (Matbat Laut), also known as the Misool, Matlou, Matlouw, Matlaw, Matlau, or Matlauw, are an ethnic group originating from Misool in Raja Ampat, Southwest Papua, Indonesia. They are one of the Ma'ya sub-ethnic groups recognized at a grand assembly of the Bomberai Customary Council. However, this recognition has sparked controversy, particularly among the Matbat, who regard them as part of the Matbat rather than as a separate ethnic group.

All or nearly all Matlow are Muslim and have long abandoned some of their original customs and traditions. This contrasts with the inland Matbat people, who are predominantly Christian and continue to preserve their customary practices and traditions. From a linguistic perspective, the languages spoken by the Matbat and Matlow communities also differ, despite their close proximity. Similarly, the Biga people from Biga have settlement patterns, livelihoods, and lifestyles comparable to those of the Matbat, reflecting indigenous Papuan culture. Nevertheless, the Biga and Matbat differ in many respects, and these two ethnic groups are therefore also regarded as distinct.

== Etymology ==
The name “Matlow” derives from two words: mat, meaning “people,” and lou, low, lau, or law, meaning “sea,” referring to those who live along the coast or by the sea. Meanwhile, the name “Matbat” comes from mat, meaning “people,” and bat, meaning “inland,” referring to those who live in the interior forests and mountainous areas.

== Origin ==
According to folklore, particularly among the Matbat people, the Matlow are coastal people or outsiders who have a long history in the customary territory of the Matbat (Batan Mee) in Misool.

== History ==
The Matlow people, also known as the Misool people, migrated to Misool hundreds of years ago and are an ethnic group that has undergone ethnic mixing over time, forming a group with its own distinct identity. They are initially believed to have originated from Waigeo and some scholars referred them as part of the Ma'ya people, both culturally and linguistically. However, they also intermarried with groups from the Maluku Islands such as Seram, Tobelo, Tidore, and Ternate. This can be seen in the physical appearance of Matlow people, as well as in the oral histories of the Matlow (Misool) people themselves.

The Matbat people, who were the first to inhabit the island, refer to the Misool people as Matlou or Matlow, meaning “coastal people.” They inhabit the southeastern part of the island, where the language spoken is called Misool or Matlow. Their villages include Waigama (located far to the west, separated from the other Matlow villages), Lilinta, Fafanlap, Kafopop (Kayerepop), Gamta, Yellu, Dabatan, Harapan Jaya, and Usaha Jaya. In general, the villages they established are slightly larger, and their population numbers are also somewhat higher than those of the Matbat villages. They live along the coast, intermingled with immigrant communities that arrived later.

== Distribution ==
The Ma'ya population on Misool Island (excluding the Biga people) is divided into two major ethnic groups: the Matbat or Matlei (Inland Matbat), who are spread across the villages of Magey, Temulol (Tomolol), Folley, Lenmalas, Atkari, Salafen, Aduwei, and Kapatcol; and the Matlow (Coastal Matbat), who are found in the villages of Fafanlap, Kafopop (Kayerepop), Yellu, and Gamta, Waigama, Lilinta, Dabatan, Usaha Jaya, and Harapan Jaya. They can also be found in Salawati Island, particularly in the villages of Sailolof and Samate. The Matbat and Matlow people in the villages of Gamta, Magey, and Yellu share common ancestry. The inhabitants of Magey and Gamta are often referred to as “Matbat Gam,” as they live in the Gam River basin.

The villages inhabited by the Matlow people are located along the coast. It is therefore not surprising that they live in coastal settlements characterized by ethnic diversity. Most Matlow villages are inhabited by other indigenous Raja Ampat tribes, particularly the Matbat. Moreover, Harapan Jaya and Yellu, which are also inhabited by Matlow people, have populations that are largely composed of migrants from the Maluku Islands, especially from Seram. Most residents of Matlow villages are Muslim, whereas in Matbat villages the majority of the population is Christian.

== Recognition as a separate ethnic group ==
On 6–9 February 2019, during a grand assembly of the Bomberai Customary Council, the Matlow people were recognized as part of the Ma'ya. However, this decision faced opposition from several Matbat community members and leaders.

The inauguration of the tribal chief and the recognition of the Matlow tribe held on 20 September 2021 in Fafanlap, was rejected by the Matbat–Misool Customary Law Community (Batan Mee). A representative of the Matbat, Abidin Macap, stated in a press release that, in his view, the rejection was not an institutional issue, but rather a matter of upholding cultural values and local wisdom. It was revealed that the event did not involve the Matbat, who are the indigenous people of Misool. It was also asserted that there is only Matbat civilization.

== Language ==
The Matlow language (Coastal Matbat), also called the Misool language by the Matlow (Misool) people who speak it, is the mother tongue of the Matlow community. The Matlow (Misool) language is different from the Matbat language, though they are still related and it may be considered a dialect. Its speakers are Muslims living in the villages of Waigama, Fafanlap, Kafopop (Kayerepop), Gamta, Lilinta, Yellu, Dabatan, Usaha Jaya, and Harapan Jaya. This language is also used by Matlow migrants on Salawati Island, such as in the villages of Sailolof and Samate.

Internally, the indigenous people of Misool Island use three different languages: the Matlow (Misool) language, while the Matbat people use the Matbat language. On the other hand, the Matbat can use the Matlow (Misool) language to communicate with their neighboring ethnic group, but the Matlow cannot speak the Matbat language. Similarly, the Biga people can speak the Matlow (Misool) language in addition to the Biga language, but not vice versa. Therefore, it can be said that the Matlow (Misool) language is more commonly used for communication among the indigenous people of Misool Island.

== Cultures ==
=== Som ===
The Matlow people, who live along the coast, celebrate som when the harvest season arrives. Som means “oath” in the Matbat language. This som tradition serves as the opening of the land sasi (“taboo land”) for the Matbat people, while the Matlow also refer to it as sasi meaning “prohibition” or “taboo.” Som is also called samsom in the Ma'ya language or fanfan in the Matlow (Misool) language.

=== Sop Safar ===
During Safar, Matlow people in Lilinta hold a cultural event named Sop Safar, meaning “Safar bath. This celebration is intended to ward off any dangers and illnesses that may arise during the month of Safar. Sop Safar is performed by leaving their homes and drinking fresh water prepared by a religious leader, also called waya kawa. The ritual takes place from after the Fajr prayer until the Asr prayer, during which participants recite prayers together. Afterwards, they are allowed to return home.

== List of clans ==
Like other indigenous communities in Papua, they also have clans (fam, marga, or keret) based on patrilineal relationships, as follows:

- Alkadry
- Botot
- Dautot
- Faam
- Fadimpo
- Falon
- Hamui
- Hay
- Jemput
- Kamausum
- Kapaunon
- Lewataka
- Matilkate
- Mjam
- Mlui
- Moom
- Soltif
- Umbalak
- Wailegi
- Wainsaf
- Wihel
