= Urbinasopen =

Urbinasopen is a kampung (traditional village) located in the eastern part of the island of Waigeo in the Raja Ampat Islands of Indonesia. It is one of four historic kampung, namely Puper, Urbinasopen, Yembekaki, and Yessener. This area has a population of more than 400 people with the majority working as fisherman or working in the fields. The village has a large dock, which does not operate every day because there is no land to go every kampung. Urbinasopen transport uses a sea route with a wooden boat which is often called the longboat, can be of the sliding track as well as from the district capital Waisai. As for its natural attractions, every year at the end of December there is a "sea ghost" phenomenon which is said to be one of the phenomena of the traditions of their ancestors.
