= Maʼya language =

Austronesian language spoken in Indonesia

Maʼya
- Native to: Indonesia
- Region: Raja Ampat Islands
- Ethnicity: Ma'ya
- Native speakers: (5,000 cited 2000–2001)
- Language family: Austronesian: Malayo-Polynesian; Central–Eastern Malayo-Polynesian; Eastern Malayo-Polynesian; South Halmahera–West New Guinea; Raja Ampat–South Halmahera; Raja Ampat; Nuclear Raja Ampat; Ma'ya–Salawati; Maʼya
- Dialects: Biga; Ma'ya; Kawe; Legenyem; Wauyai

Language codes
- ISO 639-3: Variously: slz – Ma'ya kgb – Kawe lcc – Legenyem wuy – Wauyai
- Glottolog: raja1258
- ELP: Legenyem
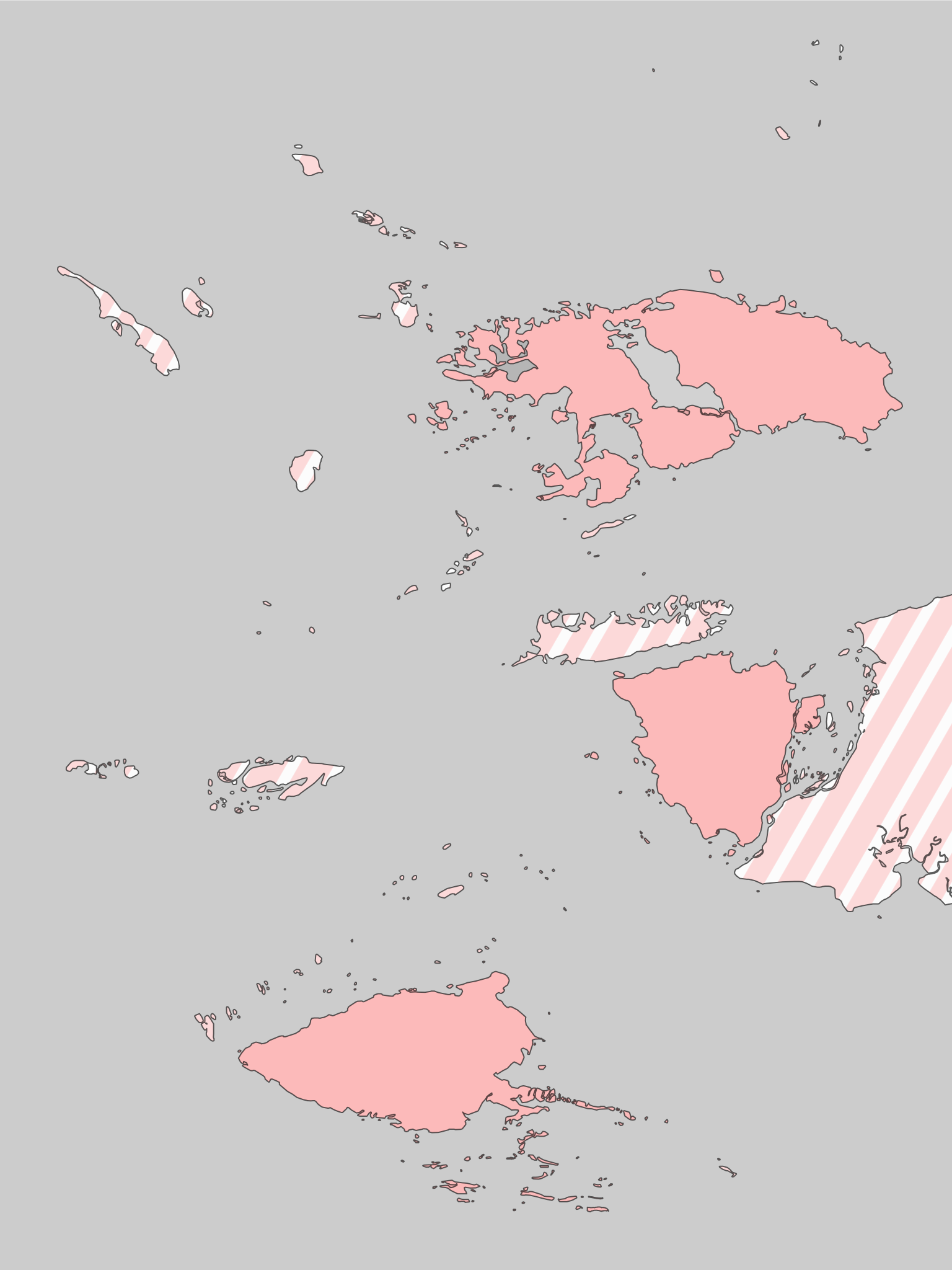

- Location within Southeast Asia
- Coordinates: 0.86°S 130.65°E

Maʼya is an Austronesian language of the Raja Ampat islands in Southwest Papua, Indonesia. It is part of the South Halmahera–West New Guinea (SHWNG) subgroup and is spoken by about 6,000 people in coastal villages on the islands of Batanta, Misool, Salawati, and Waigeo, on the boundary between Austronesian and Papuan languages.

== Dialects ==
Maʼya has five dialects: three on the island of Waigeo (Legenyem, Wauyai, and Kawe), one on Salawati and part of Batanta, and one on Misool. The prestige dialect is the one on Salawati. The varieties spoken on Salawati and Misool are characterized by the occurrence of /s/ and /ʃ/ in some words, where the Waigeo dialects (and other related SHWNG languages) have /t/ and /c/ respectively.

On Waigeo Island, the three dialects are

- The Kawe dialect in Selpele and Salyo villages in the northwest part of the island.
- The Laganyan (Legenyem) dialect is spoken in Araway, Beo, and Lopintol villages on the Mayalibit Bay coast.
- The Wauyai (Wawiyai) dialect is spoken in Wawiyai village on the Kabui Bay coast.

In Glottolog 5.2 (2025), which is based on Laura Arnold's most recent classification, the Ma'ya dialects are classified as follows:

- Misool-Salawati Ma'ya
  - Banlol
  - Batanta Ma'ya
  - Nuclear Ma'ya
- Waigeo Maya
  - Biga
  - Kawe
  - Legenyem
  - Wauyai

== Phonology ==
=== Consonants ===
| | | Labial | Alveolar | Palatal | Velar | Glottal |
|---|---|---|---|---|---|---|
| Plosive | voiceless | p | t | | k | (ʔ) |
| Plosive | voiced | b | d | | ɡ | |
| Nasal | | m | n | | (ŋ) | |
| Fricative | | f | s | | | |
| Tap | | | ɾ | | | |
| Lateral | | | l | | | |
| Approximant | | w | | j | | |

- Twelve consonants may also be heard as palatalized /pʲ, bʲ, tʲ, dʲ, kʲ, ɡʲ/; /fʲ, sʲ/; /mʲ, nʲ, lʲ, wʲ/.
- When in word-final position, six plosives can occur as unreleased [p̚, b̚, t̚, d̚, k̚, ɡ̚], as well as nasals [m̚, n̚, ŋ̚].
- /l/ can be heard as retroflex [ɭ] in word-final positions, and when preceded by a back vowel.
- /s/ can be pronounced as [ʃ] when between two /i/ vowel sounds.
- /ɾ/ can also be heard as a trill [r], when in word-final positions.
- /n/ can be heard as a velar [ŋ], when preceding velar stops. [ŋ] may also be a loan phoneme.
- The glottal stop [ʔ] is heard mostly phonetically, in word-initial position before initial vowels.
- Other sounds /ɦ, x, z/ may also occur as a result of Arabic and Indonesian loanwords.

=== Vowels ===
| | Front | Central | Back |
|---|---|---|---|
| Close | i | | u |
| Mid | e | | ɔ |
| Open | a | | |

| Phoneme | Allophones |
|---|---|
| /e/ | [e], [e̝], [ɛ] |
| /a/ | [a], [ä] |
| /ɔ/ | [ɔ], [ɔ̞], [o] |

- Other sounds /ɪ, ʊ/ are considered archiphonemes, and can also phonetically occur as a result of /i, u/ within vowel clusters.

=== Tone ===
In Maʼya, both tone and stress are lexically distinctive. This means both the stress and the pitch of a word may affect its meaning. The stress and tone are quite independent from one another, in contrast to their occurrence in Swedish and Serbo-Croatian. The language has three tonemes (high, rising and falling). Out of over a thousand Austronesian languages, there are only a dozen with lexical tone; in this case it appears to be a remnant of shift from Papuan languages.

Lexical tone is found only in final syllables.

== See also ==
- Matbat language, a neighboring language with more extreme Papuan influence and five tones.
