= Salawati language =

Language

Salawati
- Maden
- Native to: Indonesia
- Region: Bird's Head Peninsula
- Native speakers: (600 cited 2001)
- Language family: Austronesian: Malayo-Polynesian; Central–Eastern Malayo-Polynesian; Eastern Malayo-Polynesian; South Halmahera–West New Guinea; Raja Ampat–South Halmahera; Raja Ampat; Nuclear Raja Ampat; Ma'ya-Salawati; Salawati-Batta; Salawati
- Dialects: Butlih; Kawit; Tepin; Rajau; Fiawat; Waili

Language codes
- ISO 639-3: xmx
- Glottolog: made1253
- Coordinates: 1.12°S 130.87°E

Salawati is an Austronesian language spoken on Salawati Island, in the Raja Ampat Islands in Indonesian New Guinea. There is some uncertainty as to whether the dialects comprise a single language or two separate ones (divided geographically between the west and east sides of the island).

Salawati is a vulnerable-to-endangered language (6b-7 on the EGIDS scale), with younger community members having only a passive command of the language. Anecdotal reports suggest that younger speakers may be learning the language in some Tepin-dialect villages, but these reports are unconfirmed.

Like its related languages of the Raja Ampat Islands, Salawati has approximately 15 consonants and 5-6 vowels and lexical tone. It is mainly head-initial in noun phrases, and primarily uses prepositions over postpositions.

== Dialects ==
The dialects of Salawati are as follows:

- Butlih (Butleh, Butlis, Banlol) used in
  - Salawati Tengah District (Raja Ampat): Kampung Wailen, Kampung Sakabu, Kampung Kalobo
- Kawit (Esaro, Saorof), used in
  - Salawati Tengah District (Sorong): Kampung Duriankari, Kampung Maralol
  - Salawati Tengah (Raja Ampat): Kampung Kalobo
- Tepin (Tipin, Metli), used in
  - Salawati Barat District: Kampung Solol, Kampung Kaliam,
  - Salawati Utara District: Kampung Kapatlap
  - Salawati Tengah District (Raja Ampat): Kampung Kalobo, Kampung Waijan
- Rajau (Rajao), used in
  - Salawati Utara District: Kampung Mucu (included in Samate)
- Fiawat (Fiat, Fyawat) used to be a village name now used in
  - Salawati Utara District: Kampung Mucu (included in Samate)
- Waili (Wailil, Wail, Waliam) used in
  - Salawati Tengah District (Sorong): Kampung Waliam, Kampung Sakapul
