= Moi language =

Papuan language spoken in Indonesia

Moi
- Native to: Indonesia
- Region: Southwest Papua
- Ethnicity: Moi
- Native speakers: (4,600 cited 1993)
- Language family: West Papuan?: Bird's Head; West Bird's Head; Moi

Language codes
- ISO 639-3: mxn
- Glottolog: moii1235

Moi is a West Papuan language of the Bird's Head Peninsula of New Guinea.

== Phonology ==
=== Consonants ===
		Labial	Alveolar	Palatal	Velar	Glottal
Nasal		m	n		ŋ	
Plosive	voiceless	p	t		k	(ʔ)
Plosive	voiced	b	d		ɡ	
Fricative		f	s			h
Approximant		w	l	j		
Trill			r			

[ʔ] is in free variation with /k/ in word-final position.

=== Vowels ===
	Front	Central	Back
Close	i		u
Close-mid	e	ə	o
Open-mid	ɛ	ə	ɔ
Open	a		ɑ

/i, u/ can also be heard as [ɪ, ʊ].

== Morphology ==
=== Verb morphology ===
Verbs agree with the grammatical subject for person, number and, in the third-person, for gender. There are three grammatical genders: masculine, feminine and non-human. For the third person plural, the gender distinction applies only for human vs. non-human. For the first person plural, there exists a two way clusivity distinction. The agreement markers are prefixes on the main verb.

Moi subject agreement prefixes
	Singular		Plural	
1p.	t-		Incl.	Excl.
1p.	t-		w-	m-
2p.	n-			
3p.	Masculine	w-	y-	
3p.	Feminine	m-	y-	
3p.	Non-human	p-	n-	

Along with agreement prefixes cross-referencing the grammatical number of the subject, the verb stem itself can reflect number too: there may be one stem allomorph with front vowels (singular agreement) and one with back vowels (plural agreement).

ne-dala we-ben ne-laagi
person-man 3MSG-hit person-woman
'A man hit a woman'

ne-laagi me-ben ne-dala
person-woman 3FSG-hit person-man
'A woman hit a man'

te-ben miye-kiyem
1SG-hit child-little
'I hit a child'

n-auk p-au kamaser
2SG-place 3SG.NH-at.SG place.mat
'You put it on a place mat'

ne-Moi y-eek yawa k-ow
person-Moi 3PL.H-know sago.tree PROX.DEM
'Moi people knew this sago tree'

aa-ya-faagu kawak n-uu-s ow
DU-3PL.H-collect stone 3PL.NH-at.PL-PERF DEM
'They both collected stones there'

aa-m-oka aa-n-ankar mam
DU-1PL.EXCL-assume DU-2PL-cheat 1PL.EXCL
'We both thought that the two of you cheated us'

ara n-eesin n-oolok n-osu aali
breadfruit.tree 3PL.NH-fruit 3PL.NH-fall 3PL.NH-to below
'Fruits of the breadfruit tree fell down'

As can be seen in the examples (1d) and (1f) and elaborated on by Menick, elements corresponding to prepositions in English share characteristics with verbs, which is why the conclusion can be made that the lexical category of adpositions is absent in Moi.

=== Nominal morphology ===
Inalienable nouns are obligatorily marked by prefixes for the possessor agreement (see example (1h) ara n-eesin 'breadfruit fruits', literally 'breadfruit tree its fruits')

=== Negation ===
To negate a clause, the particle dau following the verb is used:

ne-Moi y-eek dau yawa k-ow
person-Moi 3PL.H-know NEG sago.tree PROX.DEM
'Moi people did not know this sago tree'

The same particle can also negate a noun phrase:

ne-Moi dau y-eek yawa k-ow
person-Moi NEG 3PL.H-know sago.tree PROX.DEM
'not the Moi people knew this sago tree'

ne-Moi y-eek yawa k-ow dau
person-Moi 3PL.H-know sago.tree PROX.DEM NEG
'the Moi people knew not this sago tree'

=== Aspect ===
The verb -ein indicates perfective aspect. It can also be indicated by the means of the suffix -s appended to the verb, cf ex. (1f) above.

ya-sak Kalasowo aali-ow p-ein y-umu
3PL.H-cross river.name below-DEM 3SG.NH-finish 3PL.H-leave:PL
'After they had crossed the Kalasowo river, they left.'
Literally: 'they crossed the Kalasowo river down there, it was finished, they left'
