= Batanta =

Island in Indonesia

- Location in Raja Ampat Islands Location in Papua

Geography
- Location: Pacific Ocean
- Coordinates: 0°52′4″S 130°39′27″E
- Archipelago: Raja Ampat Islands
- Area: 479.52 km^{2} (185.14 sq mi)
- Highest point: 1184 m

Administration
- Indonesia
- Province: Southwest Papua

Demographics
- Population: 3,999 (mid 2025 estimate)
- Pop. density: 8.35/km^{2} (21.63/sq mi)

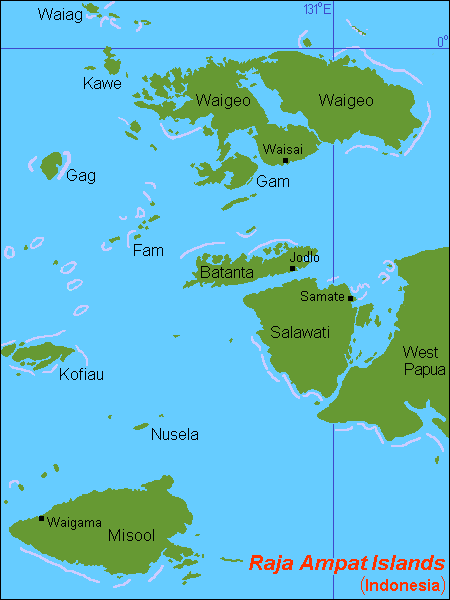
The Raja Ampat Islands

Batanta is the smallest of the four major islands in the Raja Ampat Islands in Southwest Papua province, Indonesia. Its area is 479.52 km^{2} (including smaller offshore islands) and its highest point is 1184 m. The Pitt Strait separates it from Salawati Island, while the Dampier Strait separates it from Waigeo Island. The population was estimated at 3,999 as at mid 2025. The island is divided administratively into the districts (distrik) - North Batanta (Batanta Utara) and South Batanta (Batanta Selatan).

Dampier Strait is named after the English explorer William Dampier. In 1759 Captain William Wilson sailing in the East Indiaman Pitt navigated these waters and named the channel between Batanta and Salawati as Pitt Strait, after his vessel.

== History ==
Islam first arrived in the Raja Ampat archipelago in the 15th century due to political and economic contacts with the Bacan Sultanate. During the 16th and 17th centuries, the Sultanate of Tidore had close economic ties with the island. During this period, Islam became firmly established and local chiefs began adopting Islam. Batanta was historically under the rule of the Salawati Kingdom, one of the Raja Ampat (Four Kings).

== Fauna ==
The following reptile, mammal, and bird species are found on the island:

- Blue-spotted tree monitor (Varanus macraei)
- Crocodile Monitor (Varanus salvadorii)
- Wild boar (Sus scrofa) (prehistorically introduced)
- Black rat (Rattus rattus) (uncertain; introduced)
- Wilson's bird-of-paradise (Cicinnurus respublica)
- Myoictis wallacei (uncertain)
- Echymipera kalubu (uncertain)
- Phalanger orientalis
- Spilocuscus maculatus
- Paramelomys platyops
- Dobsonia beauforti
- Dobsonia magna
- Macroglossus minimus
- Nyctimene albiventer (Common tube-nosed fruit bat)
- Pteropus conspicillatus
- Rousettus amplexicaudatus
- Syconycteris australis
- Emballonura nigrescens
- Hipposideros cervinus
- Hipposideros diadema
- Hipposideros maggietaylorae
- Rhinolophus euryotis
- Miniopterus australis
- Myotis adversus (uncertain)
- Pipistrellus papuanus
