= Waigeo =

Island in Indonesia

Native name: Pulau Waigeo
- Location in Raja Ampat Islands Location in Papua

Geography
- Coordinates: 0°12′S 130°50′E
- Archipelago: Raja Ampat Islands
- Area: 3,155 km^{2} (1,218 sq mi)
- Highest elevation: 958 m (3143 ft)
- Highest point: Buffalo Horn

Administration
- Indonesia
- Province: Southwest Papua

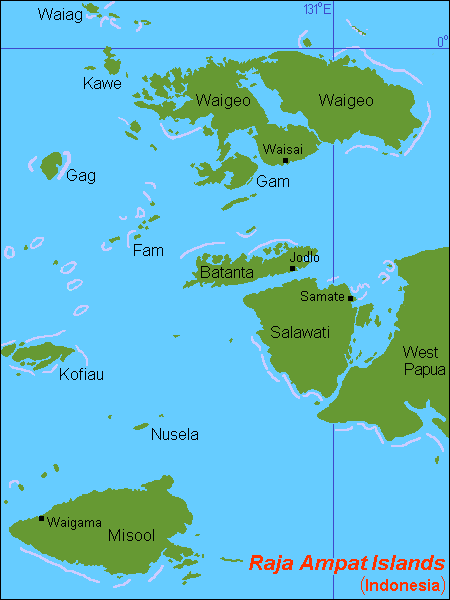
The Raja Ampat Islands

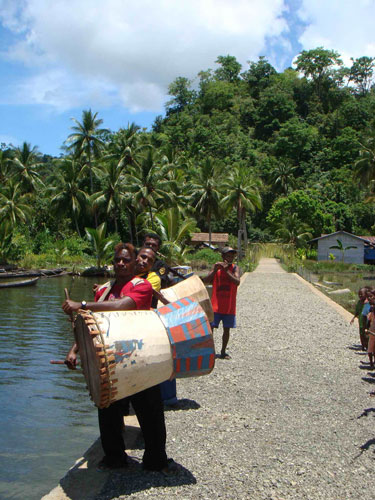
People in Waigeo

Waigeo is an island in the Southwest Papua province of eastern Indonesia. The island is also known as Amberi or Waigiu. It is the largest of the four main islands in the Raja Ampat Islands archipelago, between Halmahera and New Guinea, and about 65 kilometres (40 miles) from the northwest coast of the latter. The Dampier Strait (a.k.a. Augusta's Strait) separates it from Batanta, and the Bougainville Strait (not to be confused with the similarly-named Bougainville Strait in the Solomon Islands) from the Kawe islands (Kawe, Wayag and Sayang) to its northwest. The "inner sea" that nearly cleaves the island in two is Mayalibit Bay (Teluk Mayalibit), also known as the Majoli Gulf.

The land area of the island is 3,155 square kilometres (1,218 square miles), although with the many hundreds of outlying islands ond islets the total becomes 3,514.85 square kilometres (1,357.09 square miles); the highest elevations are the 958-metre-high (3,143-foot) Buffalo Horn (Gunung Nok) and 939-metre-high (3,081-foot) Serodjil. From west to east, the island measures approximately 110 km (68 mi), north–south about 50 kilometres (31 miles).

The town of Waisai in the south of the island is the capital of the Raja Ampat Regency, and holds more than half of the population of the island.

== History ==
Waigeo was physically connected to Gam and Batanta during most of the Pleistocene period, forming an island called Waitanta. Waitanta was first inhabited by humans over 50,000 years ago and excavations at Mololo Cave indicate people were making tree resin artefacts and hunting native animals. The first pottery-making communities were present around Waigeo about 3500–3000 years ago and may have brought Austronesian languages to the area.

Jorge de Menezes, a Portuguese explorer, may have landed on Waigeo Island in 1526–27.

Islam first arrived in the Raja Ampat archipelago in the 15th century due to political and economic contacts with the Bacan Sultanate, coinciding with Biak migrations to the region. During the 16th and 17th centuries, the Sultanate of Tidore had close economic and familial ties with the island as Gurabesi, the Biak ruler of the island married Tidore Sultan's daughter. His descendant then migrated out of Mayalibit Bay, becoming the Ma'ya kings of the other Raja Ampat Islands. During this period, Islam became firmly established, as local chiefs began adopting Islam.

Alfred Russel Wallace spent some time on the island and studied the flora and fauna during the late 1850s while on his scientific exploration trip.

Since 1997, the island has been the site of a substantial pearl farming operation owned by the Australian company Atlas Pacific.

== Administrative districts ==
The island is surrounded by numerous smaller islands and islets, of which the largest are Pulau Gaman to the south, Pulau Gag and Pulau Munsung to the west (in West Waigeo Islands District), and Pulau Kawe, Pulau Wayag and Pulau Sayang forming a chain to the northwest (in West Waigeo District). Altogether there are 165 islands included in West Waigeo District, 21 in West Waigeo Islands District, 157 in South Waigeo District and 22 in East Waigeo District. The Ayau Islands to the north of Waigeo add amother 32 named islands. Including these, the area and 2025 populations of the districts comprising northern Raja Ampat is as follows:

Kode Kemendagri	Name of District (distrik)	Land area in km^{2}	Pop'n Census 2010	Pop'n Census 2020	Pop'n Estimate mid 2025	Admin centre	No. of villages	No. of islands	Post code	Villages
92.05.03	Waigeo Selatan (South Waigeo)	240.12	1,715	2,173	2,599	Saonek	5	197	98475	Friwen, Saonek, Saporkren, Wawiyai, Yenbeser
92.05.09	Teluk Mayalibit (Mayalibit Bay)	621.93	846	1,297	1,604	Yenanas	4	34	98473	Kalitoko, Lopintol, Mumes, Warsamdin
92.05.11	Meos Mansar	218.87	1,625	2,221	2,769	Yinbekwan	9		98472	Arborek, Kabuy, Kapisawar, Kurkapa, Sawandarek, Sawinggrai, Yenbekwan, Yenbuba, Yenwaupnor
92.05.18	Kota Waisai (Waisai Town)	121.87	6,976	21,797	23,798	Waisai	4		98471	Bonwakir, Sapordanco, Waisai, Warmasen (all kelurahan)
92.05.19	Tiplol Mayalibit	200.51	930	1,171	1,356	Go	6		98474	Arway, Beo, Go, Kabilol, Waifoi, Warimak
92.05.07	Waigeo Barat (West Waigeo)	763.64	1,409	1,786	2,123	Waisilip	5	327	98464	Bianci, Mutus, Saleo, Selpele, Waisilip
92.05.15	Waigeo Barat Kepulauan (West Waigeo Islands)	103.30	2,084	2,768	3,216	Manyaifun	6	22	98465	Gag, Manyaifun, Meosmanggara, Pam, Saukabu, Saupapir
92.05.02	Waigeo Utara (North Waigeo)	149.57	1,477	1,800	2,300	Kabare	6		98466	Andey, Asukweri, Bonsayor, Darumbab, Kabare, Kalisade
92.05.14	Warwarbomi	297.33	1,045	1,389	1,538	Warwanai	4		98467	Boni, Mnier, Warkori, Warmanai
92.05.23	Supnin	223.82	908	1,117	1,283	Rauki	4		98463	Duber, Kapadiri, Rauki, Urai
92.05.05	Kepulauan Ayau ^{(a)} (Ayau Islands)	12.66	1,230	1,092	1,468	Abidon	5		98462	Boiseran, Dorehkar, Runi, Yenkanfan, Yenkawir
92.05.24	Ayau ^{(a)}	5.83	989	1,103	1,552	Dorehkar	4	45	98461	Abidon, Meosbekwan, Reni, Rutum
92.05.08	Waigeo Timur (East Waigeo)	555.40	1,386	1,609	1,987	Urbinasopen	4	27	98476	Puper, Urbinasopen, Yenbekaki, Yensner
	Total Raja Ampat Utara	3,514.85	22,620	41,323	47,593		63	652		

Note: (a) the Ayau Islands (including Ayau District) lie some distance to the north of Waigeo.

Since 2010, the new Waisai district has been created from part of Waigeo Selatan District, the new Tiplol Mayalibit District has been created from part of Teluk Mayalibit District, the new Supnin District has been created from part of Waigeo Utara District, and the new Ayau District has been created from part of Kepulauan Ayau District.

== Languages ==
Languages spoken on Waigeo include Papuan Malay, Biak, Ma'ya, and Ambel. Their distributions within the island are given below.

- Ambel is spoken in central Waigeo, along the coast of Mayalibit Bay.
- Ma'ya is spoken in northwest Waigeo.
- Biak is spoken in the southwest and eastern parts of Waigeo.

== Fauna and flora ==
- Waigeo brushturkey (Aepypodius bruijnii)
- Waigeou cuscus (Spilocuscus papuensis)
- Waigeo rainbowfish (Melanotaenia catherinae)
- Waigeo seaperch (Psammoperca waigiensis)
- Wilson's bird-of-paradise (Diphyllodes respublica)
- Golden-spotted tree monitor (Varanus boehmei)
- Achaea simplex
- Hypochlorosis ancharia
- Hypolycaena phorbas
- Karstarma waigeo
- Nepenthes danseri

== Villages ==
- Urbinasopen

== Protected Areas ==
- Waigeo Barat Timur Nature Reserve protects much of the island's interior.
- Raja Ampat Marine Park covers Mayalibit Bay in central Waigeo and parts of the southern and southwestern shores.
