= List of incumbent regional heads and deputy regional heads in Southwest Papua =

The following is an article about the list of Regional Heads and Deputy Regional Heads in 6 regencies/cities in Southwest Papua who are currently still serving.

== List ==
| Regency/ City | Photo of the Regent/ Mayor | Regent/ Mayor | Photo of Deputy Regent/ Mayor | Deputy Regent/ Mayor | Taking Office | End of Office (Planned) | Ref. |
|---|---|---|---|---|---|---|---|
| Maybrat; Regency List of Regents/Deputy Regents | | Karel Murafer | | Ferdinando Solossa | 20 February 2025 | 20 February 2030 | |
| Raja Ampat; Regency List of Regents/Deputy Regents | | Orideko Iriano Burdam | | Mansyur Syahdan | 20 February 2025 | 20 February 2030 | |
| Sorong; Regency List of Regents/Deputy Regents | | Johny Kamuru | | Sutejo | 20 February 2025 | 20 February 2030 | |
| South Sorong; Regency List of Regents/Deputy Regents | | Petronela Krenak | | Yohan Bodory | 20 February 2025 | 20 February 2030 | |
| Tambrauw; Regency List of Regents/Deputy Regents | | Yeskiel Yesnath | | Paulus Ajambuani | 20 February 2025 | 20 February 2030 | |
| Sorong; City List of Mayors/Deputy mayors | | Septinus Lobat | | Anshar Karim | 20 February 2025 | 20 February 2030 | |

Notes

- "Commencement of office" is the inauguration date at the beginning or during the current term of office. For acting regents/mayors, it is the date of appointment or extension as acting regent/mayor.
- Based on the Constitutional Court decision Number 27/PUU-XXII/2024, the Governor and Deputy Governor, Regent and Deputy Regent, and Mayor and Deputy Mayor elected in 2020 shall serve until the inauguration of the Governor and Deputy Governor, Regent and Deputy Regent, and Mayor and Deputy Mayor elected in the 2024 national simultaneous elections as long as the term of office does not exceed 5 (five) years.

== See also ==
- Southwest Papua
