= Septinus Lobat =

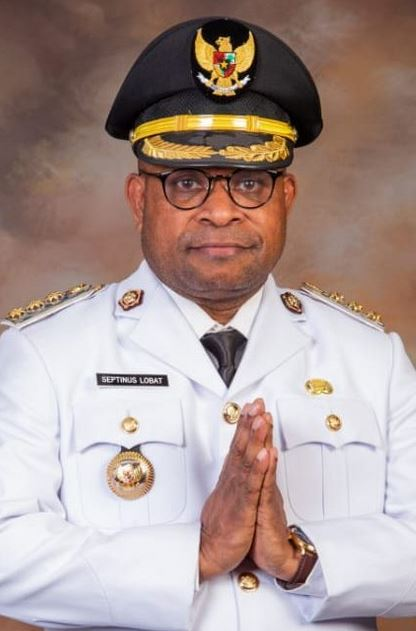

Mayor of Sorong
- Incumbent
- Assumed office 20 February 2025
- Preceded by: Lamberthus Jitmau; Bernhard Rondonuwu (act.)

Personal details
- Born: 14 March 1970 (age 56) Indiwi, Irian Jaya, Indonesia

Septinus Lobat (born 14 March 1970) is an Indonesian politician and bureaucrat who is the mayor of Sorong, Southwest Papua, serving since February 2025. He had previously served as the city's acting mayor between 2023 and 2024, and was previously part of the province's civil service.

== Early life ==
Septinus Lobat was born in the village of Indiwi, within present-day Sorong Regency, on 14 March 1970. He is of Moi origin. He studied at an elementary school in Buk, middle school in Klamono District of Sorong, and in 1986 he went to Manokwari for high school. In 1995, Lobat obtained a bachelor's in law from Manokwari's Law Academy. He would later receive a master's degree in public administration from Gadjah Mada University in 2009.

== Career ==
Lobat began to work at Sorong Regency's civil service, in 2005 having become a section head within the regency's fishery service. He continued to rise up the ranks, serving as secretary of the regency's elections commission and municipal police during his service. By 2022, he was head of Sorong Regency's public housing department. That year, he was moved to the provincial government of Southwest Papua as assistant for government affairs.

On 24 August 2023, Lobat was appointed as acting mayor of Sorong city to replace another acting mayor George Yarangga. However, he decided to resign his position on 8 August 2024 in order to run in the city's mayoral election in November 2024, and he also resigned from his civil servant position. Lobat received the endorsement of the National Mandate Party (PAN), Nasdem Party, PSI, and Labour, with Anshar Karim as his running mate. In the ensuing four-way race, Lobat and Karim won 50,255 votes (40.9%), and after an unsuccessful lawsuit by a competitor to the Constitutional Court of Indonesia, they were officially declared winners of the election on 7 February 2025. They were sworn in as mayor and vice-mayor on 20 February 2025 along with other regional leaders elected in 2024.

As mayor, Lobat announced that tuition, registration fees, book fees, and uniforms for the city's 72 public schools would be waived. The city's government also provided "selective" financial aid for private school students.

== Personal life ==
Lobat is married to Jemima Elisabeth Lobat, and the couple has four children.
