= Moi people =

Ethnic group in Indonesia

Moi
Mosana
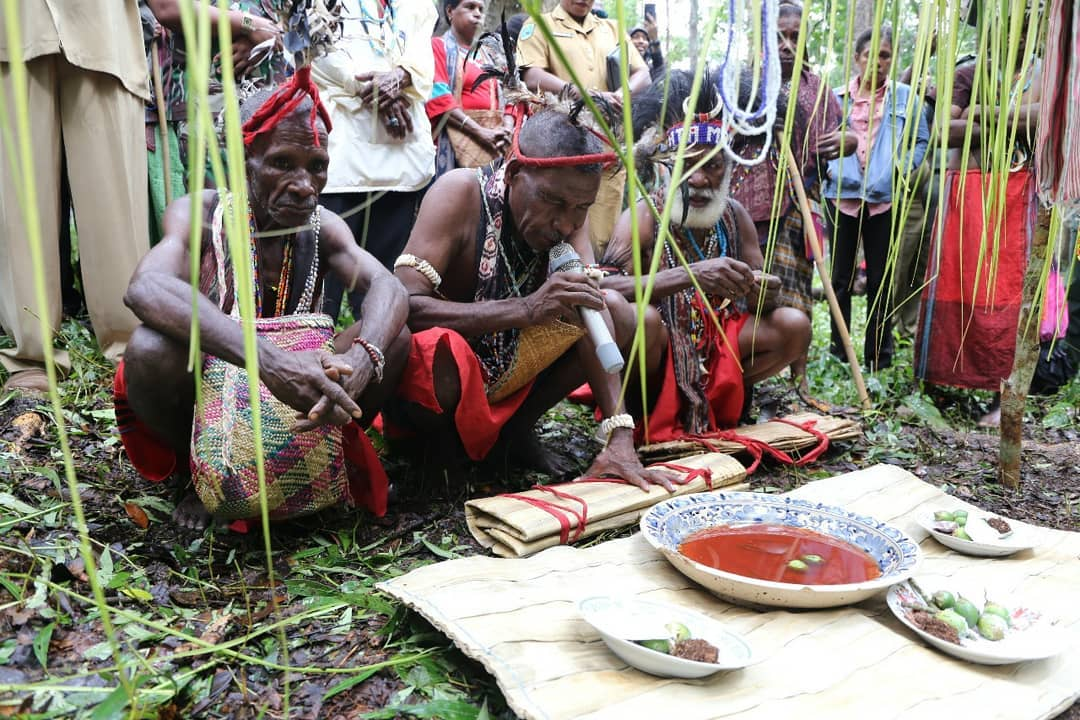
- Moi's traditional ceremony in Sorong Nature Tourism Park in 2019

Total population
- 21,923 (2010)

Regions with significant populations
- Indonesia (Southwest Papua)

Languages
- Moi, Indonesian

Religion
- Christianity 70% Indigenous religion 30%

The Moi people (Moi: Mosana) are an indigenous ethnic group in Southwest Papua, Indonesia. They live in Sorong City (Maladum, literally translated as "a vast plain where dum (Hornstedtia alliacea) grows"), Sorong Regency, South Sorong Regency, Raja Ampat, and western part of Tambrauw Regency.

Moi is divided into several sub-tribes: Moi Kelin, Moi Klabra, Moi Karon, Moi Lamas, Moi Legin, Moi Maya, Moi Moraid, Moi Salkma, and Moi Segin. Their main livelihoods are gardening and forestry. In gardening and forestry, they observe yegek (a customary resource management) to avoid excessive exploitation of natural resources, which leads to traditional conservation. Customary education is taught to the youth in a traditional house called Kambik.

== History ==
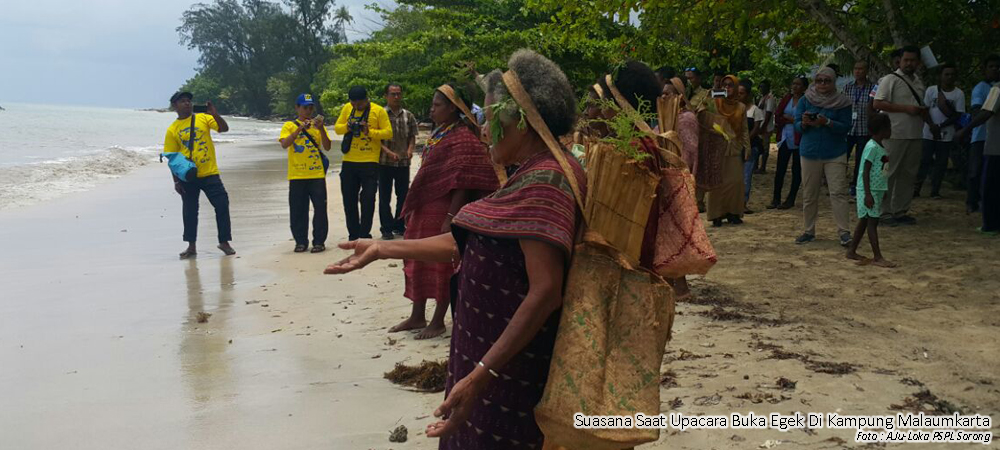
Buka Egek ceremony in Malaumkarta, Makbon, Sorong

=== Past ===
Moi is believed to have originated from Klawelem in Makbon. The indigenous Moi were called neulig (landowners) and later other tribes arrived, referred to as nesaf (migrants), especially in coastal areas. These two groups interacted with each other and intermarried, resulting in the formation of the present-day Moi. Through the formation of modern Moi, there are changes in gelet (clan names) such as Manggapraw becoming Manggablaw and Arfayan becoming Arfan.

=== Tidore Sultanate era ===
The founder of the Sailolof Kingdom was a Moi named Ulbisi. He had no patrilineal ties to the kings of Waigeo, Salawati, or Misool. According to oral tradition, Ulbisi came from around the Malyat River and was born from a baykole egg and raised on sugarcane water, hence he was named Ulbisi. He was later given the title fun Mo, meaning "king of the Moi people," on Sabba Island. He then married Pinfun Libit, the daughter of the king of Waigeo, who was stranded near Sabba along with her two servants. Fun Mo later moved to the southern part of Salawati Island, to a place that would later be called Sailolof. His descendants ruled the Sailolof and held the title Kapita-laut or Kapatla, which was acquired through trade relations with the Sultanate of Tidore.

=== Trikora era ===
Moi's youth played a role in the Operation Trikora by assisting Simon Randa, a Torajan who worked for the Dutch government, in supplying guerrilla pockets around Sorong that were formed by Trikora infiltration forces (referred to as Enso-Enso in the Moi). The youths who worked alongside Randa were: Oscar Osok, Lodewijk Osok, David Osok, Fritz Osok, Edwar Osok, Robert Malibela, Sadrak Malibela, Amanja Malibela, Edwin Malibela, Petrus Kalaibin, Steven Kalaibin, Aminyas Kalaibin, Joel Kalaibin, Karel Kalaibin, Josafat Kalaibin, Josan Kalaibin, Jonas Satisa, and Hermanus Mili. A remnant of this operation is a house located at kilometre 12 in Klasaman, Sorong.

== Sub-tribes & customary territories ==
Land in the Moi people's customary law is communal, although its use can be either individual or communal—for example, for animal husbandry, market, customary hamlet, or for villages (iik fagu). The following is the division of Moi (Malamoi) tribal land based on sub-tribes:

1. Moi Karon: Sausapor and the hinterland
2. Moi Kelin: Aimas, Mariat Gunung, and Klamono
3. Moi Klabra: Beraur, Misbra, Buk, Wanurian, Klarion, Wungkas, Wilti, Tarsa, and Hobar
4. Moi Lamas: Seget, Duriankari, Waliam, Malabam, Sailolof, and Ketlosuf
5. Moi Legin: Batulubang, Makbon, Malaumkarta, Asbaken, Dela, Mega, Klayili, Maladofok, and Sayosa
6. Moi Maya: Salawati, Batanta, Sailolof, and Julbatam
7. Moi Moraid: Sayosa, Moraid, and Salkma
8. Moi Salkma: Wemak, Klawak, Salkma, and Fokour
9. Moi Segin: Gisim, Segun, Waimon, Katapop, Katimin, Yeflio, and Kasimle

== Customs and culture ==
=== Social structure ===
Traditionally, the Moi tribe is generally divided into three groups:

- ne folus, people who are knowledgeable
- middle group, people with limited knowledge
- lower group, women

The social structure usually follows a patrilineal line, with women holding a subordinate position and men being born with special rights such as serving as customary elders and owning land, except for the Moi-Ma'ya, who have a more balanced customary structure between women and men due to the influence of the Ma'ya. Some other customary leaders of the Moi tribe are:

- ne fulus – historian
- ne foos – people with supernatural powers (shamans)
- ne ligin – speakers or spokespersons
- ne kook – wealthy and respected individuals

=== Education in Kambik ===
A young boy (nedla) must undergo education as a student (ulibi) in the Kambik to be recognized as a man. Similar to formal education, customary education is also divided into levels. At the elementary level, a student receives the title unsulu. The next level, called unsmas, is equivalent to junior and senior high school and grants the title tulukma. The highest level is untlan/kmabiek, equivalent to university, and upon graduation, the graduates receive the titles wariek, sukmin, and tukan (to become a Kambik teacher). The basic and intermediate levels take about 6–12 months, while the highest level can take up to 18 months.

There are three ways for a child to become a student:

- Being taken (abducted) — the child is returned to the family after completing training.
- Traditional selection — usually for the firstborn son.
- Representation — a child is entrusted to another clan with the payment of kain toba (a type of kain timur fabric).

Examples of the knowledge taught include:

- Hunting, such as how to determine wind direction, identify animal types, and locate them.
- Farming, such as how to cut down sago trees and preserve sago using soil and chants.
- Health, including traditional medicine using leaves, bark, fruits, and embers to cure illnesses
- Warfare, such as making shields (gili) and spears (sawiyek)
- Customary law, including marriage systems and traditional payments for the deceased, among others

Several factors contributed to the decline of Kambik customary education, including the arrival of the Dutch, who opened job opportunities such as Nederlandsch Nieuw Guinee Petroleum Maatschappij(NNGPM) for Moi youths who were supposed to undergo Kambik education, the introduction of Christianity, and World War II. Efforts to revive Kambik education have been facilitated by the Moi Indigenous Council (LMA Moi) in Maladofok, which is a sacred place for the Moi tribe.

== Bibliography ==
- Sahertian, Aldry (2018). Tradisi Lisan Pendidikan Adat Kambik Suku Moi dalam Memori Kolektif (PDF) (M.Si thesis) (in Indonesian). Salatiga: Universitas Kristen Satya Wacana.
- Suaib, Hermanto (2017). Suku Moi: Nilai‑Nilai Kearifan Lokal dan Modal Sosial dalam Pemberdayaan Masyarakat. Tangerang: An1mage. ISBN 9786026510549.
