= Aimas =

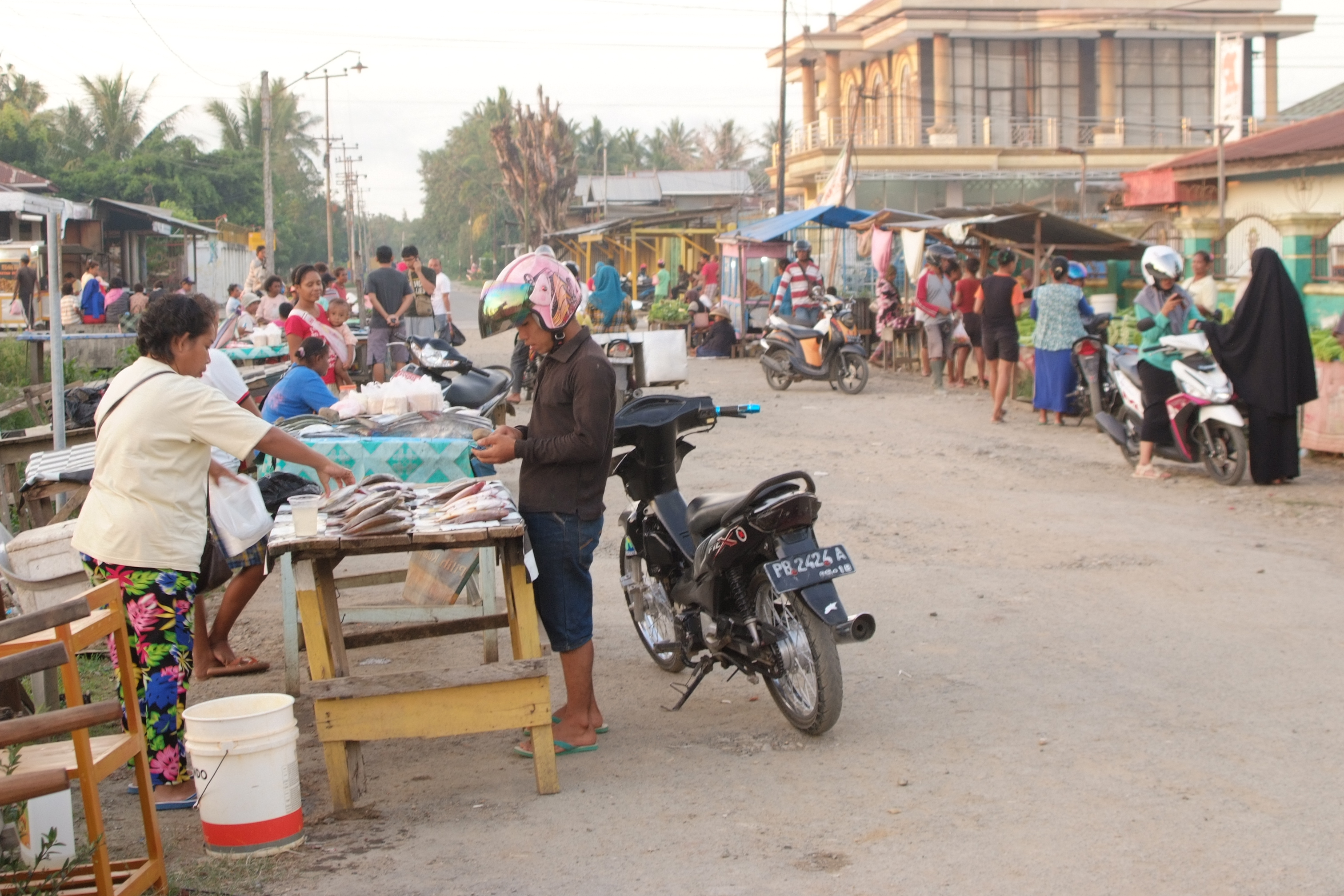

Aimas is a town (kelurahan) and an administrative district (distrik) in Sorong Regency, within the Indonesian province of Southwest Papua. It lies to the south of the city of Sorong, and is the administrative capital of Sorong Regency (which does not include the city). The district covers an area of 690.06 km^{2}, and had a population of 19,911 at the 2010 Census and 42,014 at the 2020 Census; the official estimate as at mid 2023 was 48,499. The town of Aimas contains the administrative centre of the district.

== Communities ==
Aimas District comprises eleven urban communities (kelurahan) and three rural villages (desa), all fourteen sharing the poistcode of 98444, and listed below with their official codes (kode wilayah) and their populations at the 2020 Census. The three desa are indicated by an asterisk after their names.

Kode Wilayah	Name of kelurahan or desa	Pop'n Census 2020
92.01.07.1001	Aimas (town)	9,068
92.01.07.1002	Malawili	7,142
92.01.07.1003	Malawele	7,531
92.01.07.1006	Mariat Pantai	2,575
92.01.07.1026	Mariat Gunung	878
92.01.07.2028	Maibo *	361
92.01.07.1029	Warmon	840
92.01.07.1030	Klabinain	1,508
92.01.07.1031	Malasom	5,178
92.01.07.1032	Klaigit	703
92.01.07.2033	Aimo *	352
92.01.07.1034	Malagusa	3,916
92.01.07.1035	Klafma	1,829
92.01.07.2038	Malasaum *	133
92.01.07	Totals	42,014
