= Sapta Ratna Pagoda =

Pagoda in Sorong, Indonesia

Coordinates: 0°52′44.60″S 131°16′07.7″E

The Sapta Ratna Pagoda is a Chinese pagoda in Sorong, Southwest Papua province, Indonesia.

Each month about 7,000 locals and foreigners visit the pagoda.

The Sapta Ratna Pagoda was built in the late 1990s. It has undergone minor restorations in the 2010s. It has seven wooden stories with multiple eaves and built along the same original traditions as the stupa. It still functions as a place of worship.

The pagoda is located within the city and can be reached by public transport or taxi. Just behind the pagoda is a temple and a statue of the Buddha. It is open everyday from 9 am till about 7 pm. There is a small admission fee of 60 US cents (10,000 rupiahs).
