= Salawati =

Island in Indonesia

- Location in Raja Ampat Islands Location in Western New Guinea

Geography
- Coordinates: 1°6′24″S 130°51′59″E
- Archipelago: Raja Ampat Islands
- Area: 1,623 km^{2} (627 sq mi)

Administration
- Indonesia
- Province: Southwest Papua

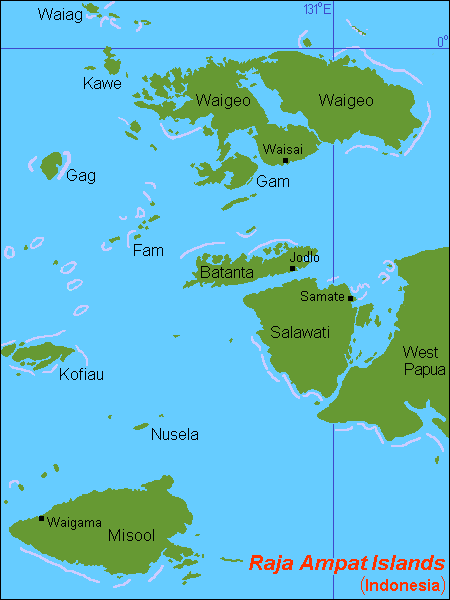
The Raja Ampat Islands

Salawati (Indonesian pronunciation: [salaˈwat̪i]) is one of the four major islands in the Raja Ampat Islands in Southwest Papua (formerly West Papua), Indonesia. Its area is 1,902.1 km^{2} (including smaller offshore islands). Salawati is separated from New Guinea to the southeast by the Sele Strait (a.k.a. Galowa Strait, Revenges Strait), and from Batanta to the north by the Pitt Strait (a.k.a. Sagewin Strait).

== History ==
Islam first arrived in the Raja Ampat archipelago in the 15th century due to political and economic contacts with the Bacan Sultanate. During the 16th and 17th centuries, the Sultanate of Tidore had close economic ties with the island. The name of the island comes from Shalawat which was spoken by the Sultan of Bacan as he arrived on the island and memorialized as 'Salawati'. During this period, Islam became firmly established, and local chiefs began adopting Islam. On this island also once stood an Islamic kingdom named Salawati Kingdom which was founded by Fun Malaban. The southern part of the island is the region of the former Sailolof Kingdom based in Sailolof, which was founded by Fun Mo, a Moi not related to the other kings but later married Pinfun Libit, daughter of Waigeo's king.

== Administration ==
Salawati Island (with small offshore islets) comprises five administrative districts (kecamatan) of Southwest Papua Province. The northern part of the island is divided into North Salawati (Salawati Utara), West Salawati (Salawati Barat), and Central Salawati (Salawati Tengah) districts of Raja Ampat Regency, while the southern part is divided into South Salawati (Salawati Selatan) and Central Salawati (Salawati Tengah) districts of Sorong Regency. Note that the name of Central Salawati District is held by two different districts in adjacent parts of the two regencies. Altogether the five districts cover an area of 1,902.1 km^{21} (including offshore islands), and had a combined population of 9,891 in mid 2024.

Kode Kemendagri	Name of District (distrik)	Land area in km^{2}	Pop'n Census 2010	Pop'n Census 2020	Pop'n Estimate mid 2024	Admin centre	No. of villages	Post code	Villages
92.05.04	Salawati Utara (North Salawati)	38.52	2,144	2,597	2,956	Samate	6	98495	Jefman Barat, Jefman Timur, Kapatlap, Samate, Waidim, Wamega
92.05.22	Salawati Tengah ^{(a)} (Central Salawati)	572.47	1,917	1,992	2,263	Kalobo	7	98494	Kalobo, Sakabu, Waibu, Waijan, Wailabu, Wailen, Waimeci
92.05.21	Salawati Barat (West Salawati)	502.47	899	1,121	1,314	Solol	4	98493	Kaliam, Kalwal, Solol, Waibon
92.01.14	Salawati Selatan (South Salawati)	295.74	2,057	1,212	1,468	Sailolof	6	98424	Dulbatan, Klotlol, Manoket, Masmaspop, Payapop, Sailolof
92.01.53	Salawati Tengah ^{(b)} (Central Salawati)	492.90	^{(c)}	1,529	1,890	Waliam	10	98425	Batbiro, Duriankari, Manfanim, Maralol, Meyaup, Sailen, Sakapul, Waibin, Waiman, Waliam

Notes: (a) within Raja Ampat Regency. (b) within Sorong Regency.
(c) the 2010 population of the new Salawati Tengah District of Sorong Regency is included with the figure for Salawati Selatan District from which it was separated.
There is also a Salawati District on the Papuan mainland, facing Salawati Island across the islet-studded Sele Strait. It is also a part of Sorong Regency but is obviously not part of Salawati Island.

== Pulau Salawati Utara Nature Reserve ==
Pulau Salawati Utara Nature Reserve
- Cagar Alam Pulau Salawati Utara
- IUCN category Ia (strict nature reserve)
- Interactive map of Pulau Salawati Utara Nature Reserve
- Area: 57,000 ha (220 sq mi)
- Operator: Balai Besar Konservasi Sumber Daya Alam Papua Barat

Pulau Salawati Utara Nature Reserve covers much of the northern portion of the island, with an area of 570 km^{2} on the northern portion of the island. It protects part of the island's native lowland rainforest.

== See also ==
- Raja Ampat Islands
- Salawati Kingdom
