= Soop (Southwest Papua) =

Island in Southwest Papua, Indonesia

Sop, Tsiof
- Soop is the big island at the centre of the map.

- Location in Southwest Papua Location in Western New Guinea

Geography
- Location: Sele Strait
- Coordinates: 0.89°S 131.2°E
- Area: 2.67 km^{2} (1.03 sq mi)
- Length: 3.3 km (2.05 mi)
- Coastline: 8 km (5 mi)
- Highest elevation: 53 m (174 ft)

Administration
- Indonesia
- Province: Southwest Papua
- City: Sorong
- District: Sorong Islands

Demographics
- Population: 1,378 (mid 2021 estimate)

Soop, also known as Sop or Tsiof, is an island in Southwest Papua province of Indonesia, located in the north of Sele Strait, and off the northwestern coast of the Bird's Head Peninsula. It lies at a distance of about 4 kilometres (2.5 mi) west of the city of Sorong on the mainland, 2.5 kilometres (1.6 mi) west of the island of Doom, 3 kilometres (1.9 mi) northwest of the uninhabited island of Nana, 6 kilometres (3.7 mi) north-east of the island of Yefman, and 5 kilometres (3.1 mi) south of the island of Raam. Soop is 3.3 kilometres (2.1 mi) long and up to 1.3 kilometres (0.81 mi) wide, with an area of 2.67 square kilometres (1.03 sq mi).

There is a settlement covering the north and east coasts of the island. It has a population of 1,378 (according to the official estimate for mid 2021) and constitutes a kelurahan within the district of Sorong Islands within the City of Sorong. Outside the settlement, and apart from a small mangrove patch in the southeast, the island is covered by shrub and savannah-type vegetation. Its highest point is at an elevation of 53 metres (174 ft).

== Bibliography ==
- Atlas peta potensi pengembangan komoditas dan kawasan perkebunan kakao dan pala provinsi Papua Barat (PDF). 2015. p. 55.
- Badan Pusat Statistik (BPS) Kabupaten Kota Sorong. Distrik Sorong Kepulauan Dalam Angka 2017 (Report). p. 34.
- Penutupan Lahan 2011 (available at WebGIS Kehutanan), a land cover dataset
- Sailing directions (enroute) : New Guinea (PDF). National Geospatial-intelligence Agency. 2018. pp. 112–13.
