= Raam (Southwest Papua) =

Island in West Papua, Indonesia

Ram, Buaya
- Raam is in the north of the group of islands off Sorong.

- Location in Southwest Papua Location in Western New Guinea

Geography
- Coordinates: 0.838°S 131.214°E
- Area: 0.52 km^{2} (0.20 sq mi)
- Length: 1.6 km (0.99 mi)
- Coastline: 4 km (2.5 mi)
- Highest elevation: 65 m (213 ft)

Administration
- Indonesia
- Province: Southwest Papua
- City: Sorong
- District: Sorong Islands

Demographics
- Population: 2,078 (mid 2021 estimate)

Raam, also spelt Ram, is an island in Southwest Papua province of Indonesia, located off the northwestern tip of the Bird's Head Peninsula of New Guinea. It lies at a distance of about 2 kilometres (1.2 mi) from the coast of the city of Sorong (of which it is administratively part), and about 5 kilometres (3.1 mi) north of the islands of Doom and Soop (or Tsiof). About 1.6 kilometres (0.99 mi) long and up to 0.5 kilometres (0.31 mi) wide, Raam has an area of 0.5 square kilometres (0.19 sq mi). Occupying the eastern half of the island is a settlement with a population of 2,078 (as of mid 2021), which forms a kelurahan within the district of Sorong Islands in the City of Sorong.

== Bibliography ==
- Atlas peta potensi pengembangan komoditas dan kawasan perkebunan kakao dan pala provinsi Papua Barat (PDF). 2015. p. 55.
- Badan Pusat Statistik (BPS) Kabupaten Kota Sorong. Distrik Sorong Kepulauan Dalam Angka 2022 (Report). p. 34.
- Penutupan Lahan 2011 (available at WebGIS Kehutanan), a land cover dataset
- Sailing directions (enroute) : New Guinea (PDF). National Geospatial-intelligence Agency. 2018. p. 112. Archived from the original (PDF) on 2019-08-21.
