= Konhir =

District in Southwest Papua, Indonesia

- District
- Interactive map of Konhir
- Coordinates: 1.1741302°S 131.7700222°E
- Country: Indonesia
- Province: Southwest Papua
- Regency: Sorong

Area
  - Total: 394.32 km^{2} (152.25 sq mi)
- Time zone: UTC+9 (WIT)
- Postal Code: 98438

Konhir is an administrative district in Sorong Regency, Southwest Papua, Indonesia.
