= Maudus =

District in Southwest Papua, Indonesia

- District
- Interactive map of Maudus
- Coordinates: 0°56′55.9316″S 132°4′11.506″E
- Country: Indonesia
- Province: Southwest Papua
- Regency: Sorong
- District seat: Luwelala

Area
  - Total: 443.61 km^{2} (171.28 sq mi)
- Time zone: UTC+9 (WIT)
- Postal Code: 98457
- Villages: 9

Maudus is a district in Sorong Regency, Southwest Papua, Indonesia.

== Geography ==
Maudus consists of nine villages (kampung), namely:

- Luwelala
- Klatim
- Klaos
- Suluh
- Bosi
- Kamuyar
- Klaka
- Safdesa
- Klagen
