= Bagun =

District in Southwest Papua, Indonesia

- District
- Interactive map of Bagun
- Coordinates: 1°16′24″S 131°35′23″E
- Country: Indonesia
- Province: Southwest Papua
- Regency: Sorong
- District seat: Disfra

Area
  - Total: 443.61 km^{2} (171.28 sq mi)

Population (mid 2024 estimate)
  - Total: 629
  - Density: 1.42/km^{2} (3.67/sq mi)
- Time zone: UTC+9 (WIT)
- Postal Code: 98431
- Villages: 9

Bagun is an administrative district (distrik) in Sorong Regency, Southwest Papua, Indonesia.

== Geography ==
Bagun District consists of 9 villages (kampung), namely:

- Bagun
- Bratmawe
- Disfra
- Klakwonrit
- Klamomis
- Klawom
- Klawon
- Mlamli
- Mode
