= Mariat =

District in Southwest Papua, Indonesia

- District
- Location within the Indonesian region of Western New Guinea
- Coordinates: 1.008323°S 131.319319°E
- Country: Indonesia
- Province: Southwest Papua
- Regency: Sorong Regency
- District seat: Mariyai

Area
  - Total: 542.19 km^{2} (209.34 sq mi)

Population (2023)
  - Total: 17,841
  - Density: 32.905/km^{2} (85.225/sq mi)
- Time zone: UTC+09:00 (Eastern Indonesia Time)
- Postal Code: 98445

Mariat is a district in Sorong Regency, Southwest Papua, Indonesia.

== Geography ==
Mariat district consists of 11 villages (Desa/Kelurahan), namely:

- Fafi
- Jamaimo
- Kasih
- Klaben
- Klamalu
- Klamasen
- Klaru
- Klasan
- Klasuluk
- Maklalut
- Mariyai
