= Gurabesi =

Gurabesi was a legendary Papuan leader from Biak in West New Guinea (present-day Indonesia) who had a large role in tying part of the Papuans to the Islamic Sultanate of Tidore. He is commonly believed to have flourished in the 15th or early 16th century, although other sources point at a later date. His story symbolizes the beginnings of communication between the Malayo-Islamic and Papuan cultures.

== War leader from Biak ==
Gurabesi is a Tidorese name meaning "iron spark" from the word gura (spark) and besi (iron); although other explanations of his name include "teacher of iron" from the word guru (teacher) and besi (iron), or "we go to them" from the Biak words ku (we), ra (go), be (to), and si (they). He was identified in local Biak tradition with the legendary hero Sekfamneri. Legend says that he was a prominent fighter, mambri, who had an outstanding role in the fighting between the Biak and the Sawai, who inhabited south-eastern Halmahera and tried to establish themselves in the islands later known as Raja Ampat. Through his cunning strategems he helped the Biak warriors to repeated victory. A Sawai fortification in Patani was overcome through poisoning the watchdogs at night and thus enabling a surprise attack. The center of his activities as a sea raider was Wawiai in Waigeo, one of the Raja Ampat Islands. During his travels overseas he came to hear about the four kingdoms of Maluku, Kororo (Tidore), Karnaki (Ternate), Jailolo, and Bacan, and decided to make contact with these rulers.

== Bonding the Tidore ruler ==
At a time, Gurabesi set out with a large war canoe with 30 rowers, and reached Tidore after an adventurous journey where his supernatural power ensured that the men obtained good water and catches of fish. At the moment when the vessel arrived, Tidore was acutely threatened by a large armada from Jailolo (Halmahera). Gurabesi at once offered his service to the Sultan of Tidore, Al-Mansur (d. 1526), addressing him with "Jou, Jou" (Lord, Lord). The sultan promised to fulfil any wish from Gurabesi if he could help him repel the invasion. Gurabesi then carved an arrowhead from a piece of sacred wood and led the Tidorese ships against the enemy. As he shot against the Jailolo fleet, the magic arrow pierced all the enemies. As a reward for the victory, Gurabesi received Al-Mansur's daughter Boki Taebah for his wife.

An alternative version says that Al-Mansur asked the Sangaji (sub-ruler) of Patani, Sahmardan, to find a man who was capable enough to assist him in a war against Ternate. Though neighbouring islands, Tidore and Ternate lived in a constant state of conflict. Sahmardan promised to look for such a person and travelled the islands, finally meeting the local leader (with a European-derived title, Kapita) of Waigeo, Gurabesi, who agreed to assist in the war. Then followed his successful intervention in Maluku, and marriage with Boki Taebah, whom he brought back to Waigeo.

== Establishment of Tidore in Papua ==
At a later time, Al-Mansur began to wonder what had happened to his child. He also wished to expand his tiny kingdom. For these reasons he undertook an expedition to the east. He met with Gurabesi at Waigeo and then went to the mainland of New Guinea with him and Sahmardan of Patani. Along his journey, he selected suitable persons to become subrulers with titles such as sangaji and gimalaha. After this successful display of peaceful subjugation, he returned via Waigeo. There, he appointed the four sons of Gurabesi and Boki Taebah, thus his grandsons, as rulers of Waigeo, Salawati, Waigama, and Misool. These became the Raja Ampat ("Four Kings"). (Note: While Waigama was ruled by a king and is considered one of the four kings by Tidore, locally the fourth king is ruler of Sailolof.) There are various versions of this story, one of which says that it was actually the kapita of Buli, Maba, Bicoli, and Patani who were made rulers of the four Papuan island kingdoms.

== Gurabesi in historical sources ==
The name Goerabessi (Gurabesi) is also known from Dutch sources, although these are from a much later time than Al-Mansur of the 16th century. In the mid-17th century, Tidore was at war with the Dutch East India Company (VOC). A report from 1649 relates that a Gourabessi brought 24 ships with sago, a locally important foodstuff, from the Papuan Islands to assist the Tidorese king Saidi. When the convoy was on its way it was attacked by ships from Kau and Dodinga in Jailolo Island (Halmahera) who acted on behalf of the VOC. The enemy managed to kill some of the crew, but the bulk of the convoy was able to break through and reach Tidore. The Dutch were irritated that their ally Ternate had not been able to impede the delivery. At least some of this fits with the legend of Gurabesi. According to descendants of the royals of Raja Ampat, Herry Arfan of Salawati and Yasin Mayalibit of Waigeo or Sailolof, the name Gurabesi was also used as a title for his descendants, the kings of Raja Ampat (predominantly of Salawati as the most influential). Fun Baijit Kalewan who converted to Islam was the fourth Gurabesi, while Muhamad Amirudin Arfan who guided the missionaries Carl Wilhelm Ottow and Johann Gottlob Geissler to Mansinam Island, was the ninth Gurabesi.
