= Raja Ampat Islands =

Archipelago in Southwest Papua, Indonesia

Native name: Kepulauan Raja Ampat (Indonesian) Kalano Muraha, Kolano Nguraha (Tidore) Kalana Fat (Ma'ya)
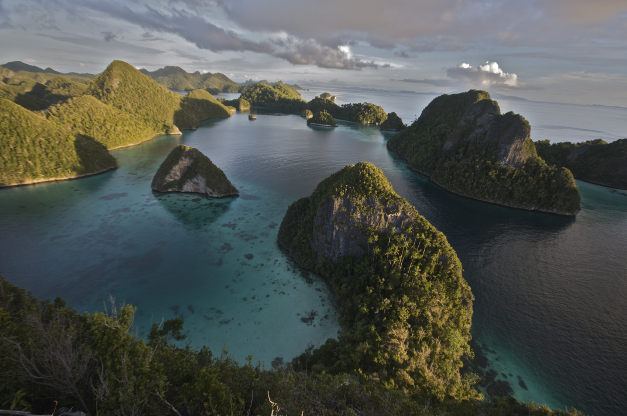
- Panoramic view

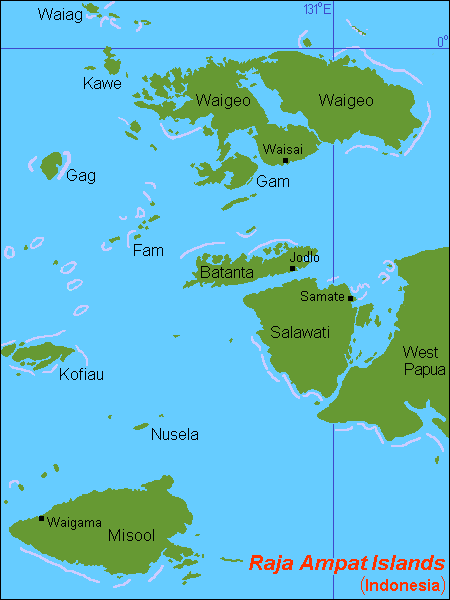
- Map of the islands

- Location in Indonesia

Geography
- Coordinates: 0.2333115°S 130.5078908°E
- Archipelago: Melanesia
- Total islands: 612
- Major islands: Misool; Salawati; Batanta; Waigeo
- Area: 8,034.44 km^{2} (3,102.11 sq mi)

Administration
- Indonesia
- Province: Southwest Papua
- Regency: Raja Ampat; Sorong

Demographics
- Population: 66,839 (mid 2022 estimate)
- Pop. density: 8.32/km^{2} (21.55/sq mi)

Raja Ampat (Indonesian pronunciation: [ˌrad͡ʒa ˈ(ʔ)ampat̪̚]), or the Four Kings, is an archipelago located off the northwest tip of Bird's Head Peninsula (on the island of New Guinea), Southwest Papua province, Indonesia. It comprises over 1,500 small islands, cays, and shoals around the four main islands of Misool, Salawati, Batanta, and Waigeo, and the smaller island of Kofiau.

The Raja Ampat archipelago is just south of the equator and forms part of the Coral Triangle, an area of Southeast Asian seas containing the richest marine biodiversity on earth. The Coral Triangle itself is an approximate area west-southwest of the Philippines, east-northeast and southeast of the island of Borneo, and north, east, and west of the island of New Guinea, including the seas in between. Thousands of species of marine organisms, from the tiniest cleaner shrimp and camouflaged pygmy seahorses to the majestic cetaceans and whale sharks, thrive in these waters.

Since 2024, the archipelago is part of the province of Southwest Papua (formerly West Papua (province)). Most of the islands constitute the Raja Ampat Regency, which was separated from Sorong Regency in 2004. The regency encompasses around 70,000 square kilometres (27,000 mi^{2}) of land and sea, of which 8,034.44 km^{2} constitutes the land area and has a population of 64,141 at the 2020 census; the official estimate as at mid 2022 was 66,839. This excludes the southern half of Salawati Island, which is not part of this regency but instead constitutes the Salawati Selatan and Salawati Tengah Districts of Sorong Regency.

From 2019 onwards, the natural conservation in the islands has been endangered by illegal mining (e.g. nickel) that has caused widespread criticism from the Indonesian public.

== History ==
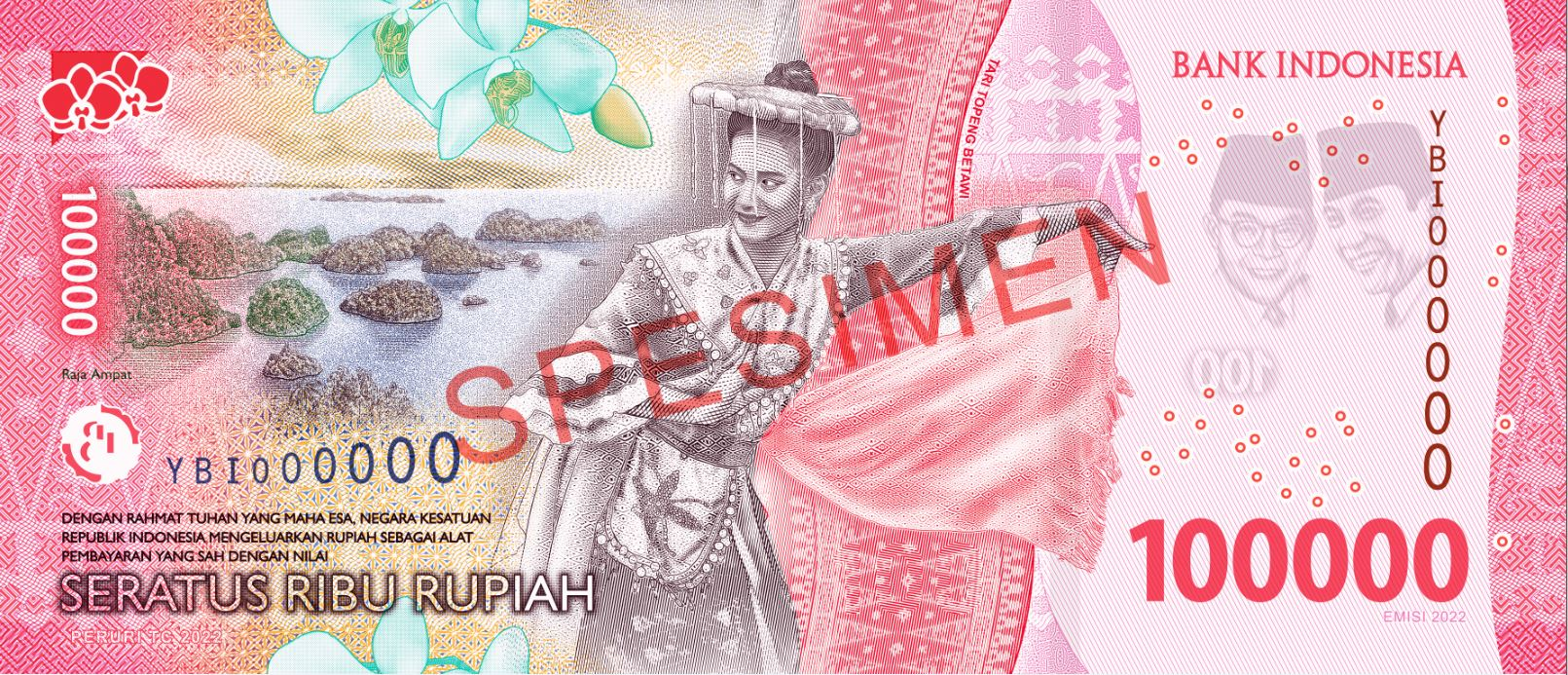
Raja Ampat Islands featured on the reverse side of the 100,000 rupiah banknote

Archaeological evidence indicates that the Raja Ampat Islands were first visited by humans over 50,000 years ago. At this time, Misool and Salawati were connected to New Guinea, while Waigeo and Batanta formed an island called Waitanta. At the Mololo Cave site, excavations show that early people were processing tree resins and hunting native animals. Pottery-making communities moved into Raja Ampat about 3500–3000 years ago and may have brought Austronesian languages to the area.

The name of Raja Ampat (Raja means king, and empat means four) comes from local mythology that told of a woman who found seven eggs; in one version, this woman was Boki Tabai, daughter of Al-Mansur of Tidore and wife to Gurabesi. Three of the seven hatched and became kings who occupied the Raja Ampat Islands, the fourth hatched and settled in Waigama but later migrated to Kalimuri (Seram). In another version, the fifth egg hatched into a woman (Pin Take) who later washed away to Biak, married Manar Makeri, and later gave birth to Gurabesi. The sixth egg hatched into a spirit, while the seventh egg did not hatch and turned to stone and worshipped as a king in Kali Raja (Wawiyai, Waigeo). Historically the 'four' kingdoms were Waigeo, Salawati, Sailolof, Misool, and Waigama. Locally Waigama is not considered one of the Raja Ampat, while Sailolof is not considered one of the Raja Ampat by Tidore.

The first recorded sighting and landing by Europeans of the Raja Ampat Islands was by the Portuguese navigator Jorge de Menezes and his crew in 1526, en route from Biak, the Bird's Head Peninsula, and Waigeo, to Halmahera (Ternate).

Islam first arrived in the Raja Ampat Islands in the 15th century due to political and economic contacts with the Bacan Sultanate. During the 16th and 17th centuries, the Maluku-based Sultanate of Tidore had close economic and political ties with the islands, especially with Gurabesi. During this period, Islam became firmly established, and local chiefs began adopting Islam.

As a consequence of these ties, Raja Ampat was considered a part of the Sultanate of Tidore. After the Dutch invaded Maluku, it was claimed by the Netherlands.

The English explorer William Dampier gave his name to Dampier Strait, which separates Batanta Island from Waigeo Island. To the east, there is a strait that separates Batanta from Salawati. In 1759, Captain William Wilson, sailing in the East Indiaman Pitt navigated these waters and named a strait the 'Pitt Strait', after his vessel; this was probably the channel between Batanta and Salawati.

== Climate ==
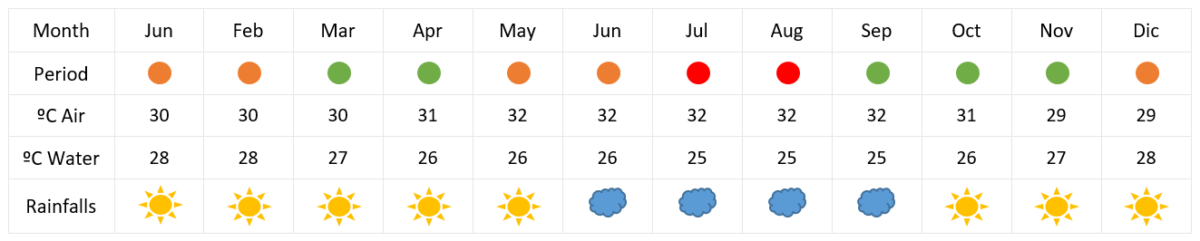
Weather in Raja Ampat (2016).

The islands have a tropical climate, with temperatures ranging from 20 to 33 °C (68 to 91 °F).

Water temperature in North Raja Ampat ranges from 28 to 30 °C (82 to 86 °F), while in the South in Misool, it ranges from 26 to 28 °C (79 to 82 °F) (Water temperature chart in Misog ol).

== Ecology ==
In 2025, the islands were designated as a biosphere reserve by UNESCO.

=== Terrestrial ===
The islands are part of the Vogelkop-Aru lowland rain forests ecoregion. The rainforests that cover the islands are the natural habitat of many species of birds, mammals, reptiles, and insects. Two species of bird-of-paradise, the red bird-of-paradise (Paradisaea rubra) and Wilson's bird-of-paradise (Diphyllodes respublica), are endemic to the islands of Waigeo, Gam, and Batanta.

The recently [when?] discovered palm tree Wallaceodoxa raja-ampat is endemic to the Raja Ampat Islands.

=== Marine ===
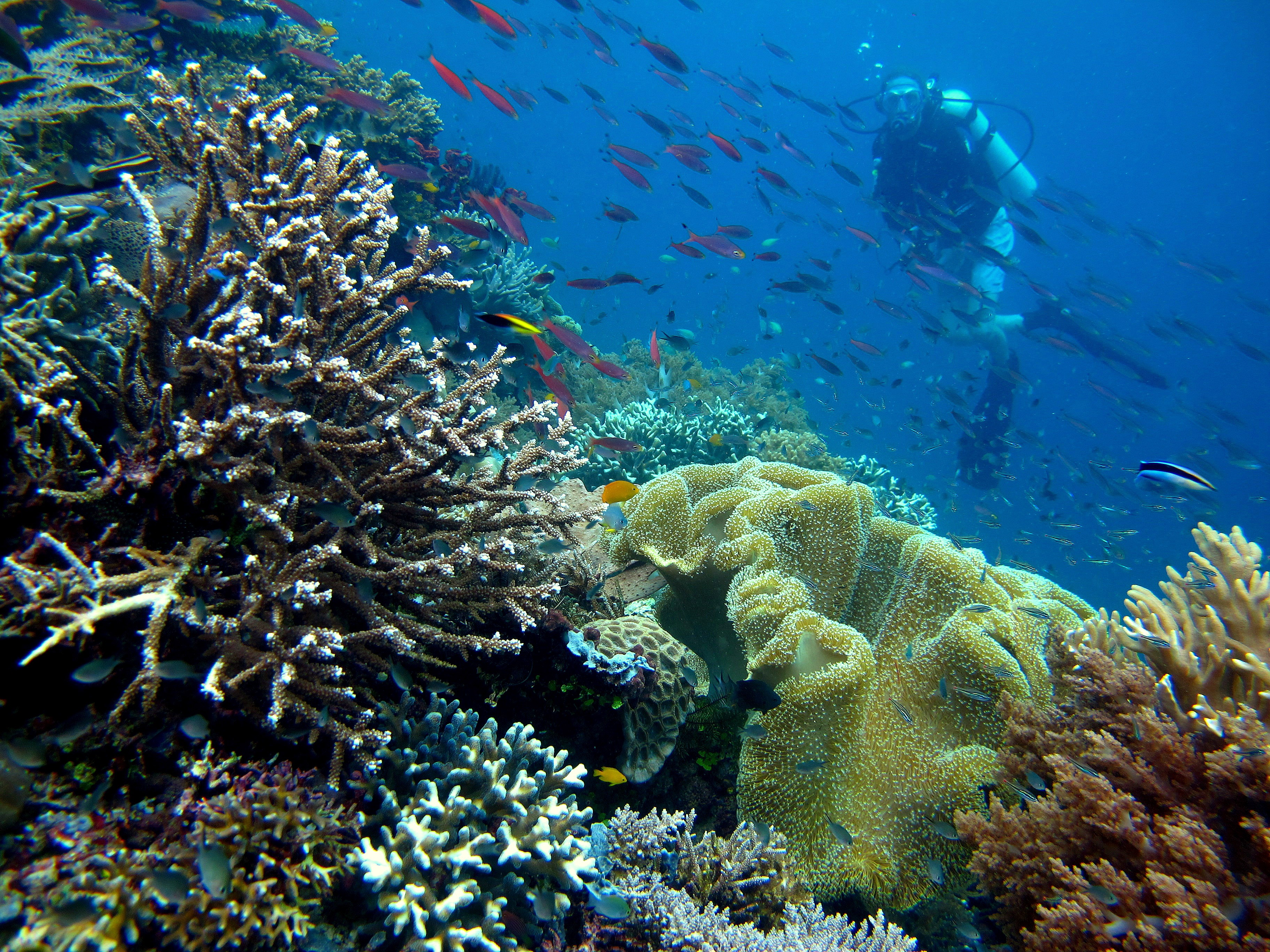
Coral reef off Piaynemo, an island in Misool District

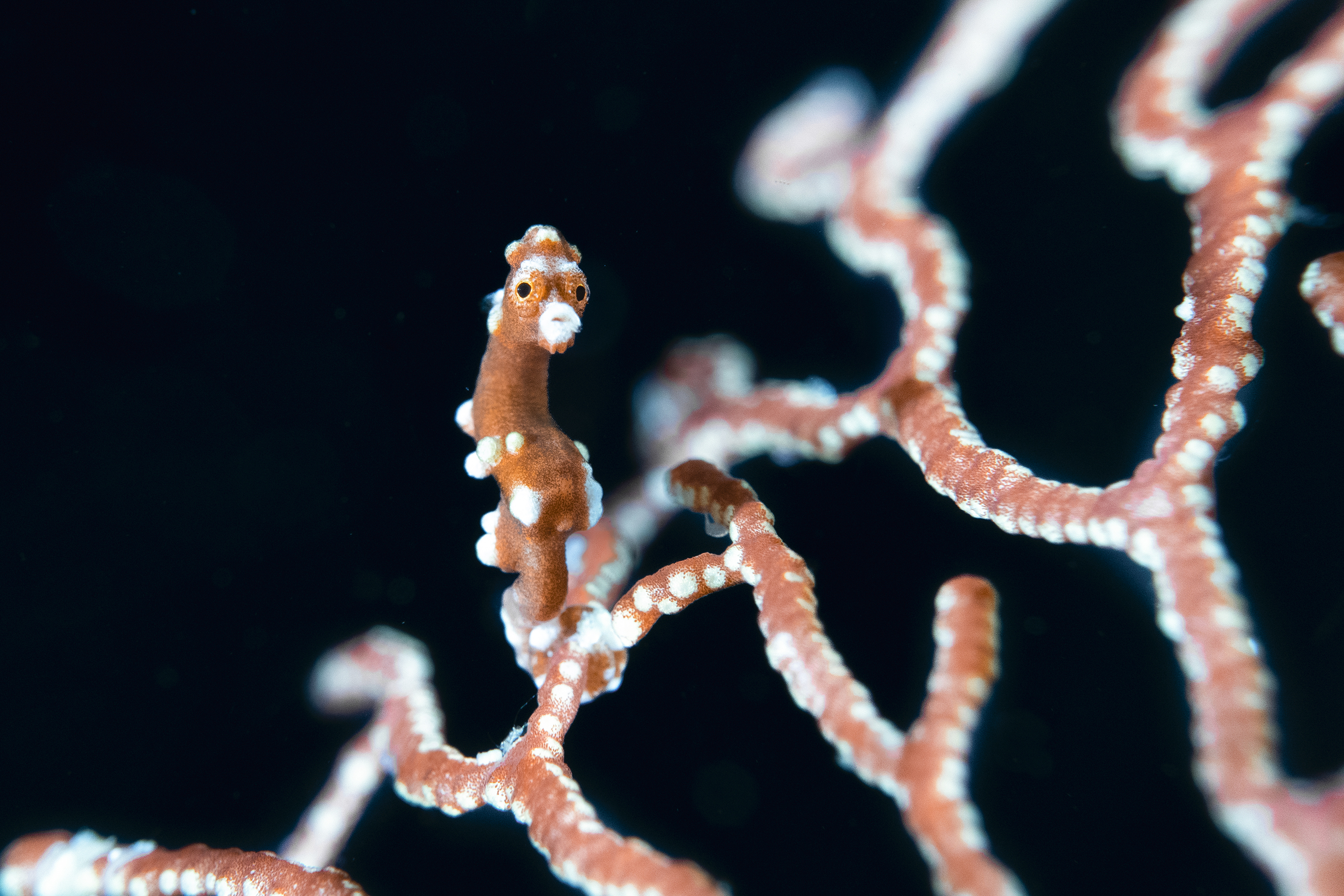
Denise's pygmy seahorse

Raja Ampat is considered the global epicentre of tropical marine biodiversity and is referred to as "The Crown Jewel" of the Bird's Head Seascape, which also includes Cenderawasih Bay and Triton Bay. The region contains more than 600 species of hard corals, constituting about 75% of the world's known species, and more than 1,700 species of reef fish – including on both shallow and mesophotic reefs. Compared to similarly-sized ecosystems elsewhere in the world, Raja Ampat's biodiversity is arguably the richest in the world. Endangered and rare marine mammals, such as dugongs, whales (such as blue, pygmy blue, Bryde's, Omura's, sperm), dolphins, and even orcas occur here. Endangered whale sharks, the largest extant fish species on earth, also thrive in this region.

In the northeast region of Waigeo Island, local villagers have been involved in turtle conservation initiatives by protecting nests or relocating eggs of leatherback, olive ridley, and hawksbill turtles. Their works are supported by the local government and NGOs.

Raja Ampat Marine Recreation Park was designated in 2009. It is composed of four marine areas – the waters around northern Salawati, Batanta, and southwestern Waigeo, Mayalibit Bay in central Waigeo, the waters southeast of Misool, and waters around the Sembilan Islands north of Misool and west of Salawati.

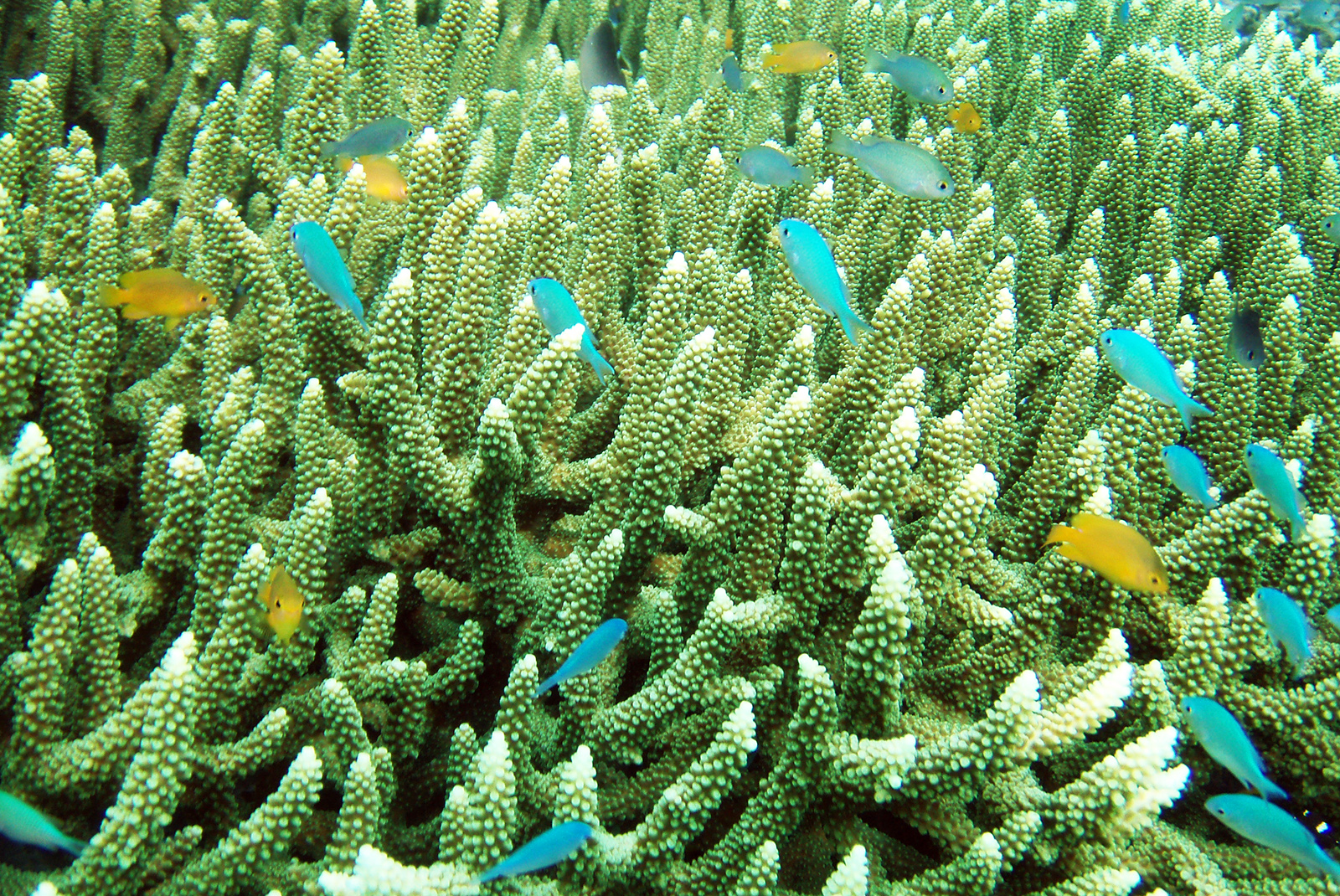
Marine biodiversity of Raja Ampat.

The oceanic natural resources around Raja Ampat give the area significant potential as a tourist area, drawing divers, researchers, and others with an interest in the marine life there.

According to Konservasi Indonesia, marine surveys suggest that the marine life diversity in the Raja Ampat area is the highest recorded on Earth. Diversity is considerably greater than in any other area sampled in the Coral Triangle, composed of Indonesia, Malaysia, Philippines, Papua New Guinea, the Solomon Islands, and East Timor. The Coral Triangle is the heart of the world's coral reef biodiversity, making Raja Ampat quite possibly the richest coral reef ecosystem in the world.

The area's massive coral colonies, along with relatively high sea surface temperatures, also suggest that its reefs may be relatively resistant to threats like coral bleaching and coral disease, which now jeopardize the survival of other coral ecosystems around the world. The Raja Ampat islands are remote and relatively undisturbed by humans.

The crown-of-thorns starfish eats Raja Ampat's corals, and the destruction this causes among reefs has posed a threat to tourism. The crown-of-thorns starfish, which "can grow around as big as a trash-can lid" and is covered in sharp, stinging spines, has proliferated due to increasing nitrogen in the water from human waste, which in turn causes a spike in phytoplankton on which the starfish feed. In 2019, local divers began the task of reducing starfish populations by injecting the starfish with a 10% vinegar solution; the dead starfish can then be eaten by local fish.

The high marine diversity in Raja Ampat is strongly influenced by its position between the Indian and Pacific Oceans, as coral and fish larvae are more easily shared between the two oceans. Raja Ampat's coral diversity, resilience, and role as a source for larval dispersal make it a global priority for marine protection. Its location results in it being a biogeographic crossroads between Indonesia, Micronesia and the Arafura Sea.

1,508 fish species, 537 coral species (a remarkable 96% of all scleractinians recorded from Indonesia are likely to occur in these islands and 75% of all species that exist in the world), and 699 mollusk species, the variety of marine life is staggering. Raja Ampat is identified as the epicenter of restricted-range reef fishes, in the Coral Triangle with over 100 species of endemic reef fishes, and also an extremely high diversity of reef coral species (over 600 475 species).

The Raja Ampat Islands have at least three ponds containing harmless jellyfish, all in the Misool area.

The submarine world around the islands was the subject of the documentary film Edies Paradies 3 (by Otto C. Honegger), which has been broadcast by the Swiss television network Schweizer Fernsehen.

In March 2017, the 90-metre-long (295 ft) cruise ship Caledonian Sky owned by British tour operator Noble Caledonia got caught in a low tide and ran aground on the reef. An evaluation team estimated that 1,600 square metres (17,000 sq ft) of the reef was destroyed, which will likely result in a compensation claim of $1.28 million – $1.92 million. A team of environmentalists and academics estimated much more substantial damage, with potential losses to Indonesia estimated at $18.6 million and a recovery time for the reef spanning decades.

A zebra shark breeding and release initiative started in 2022, aiming to release 500 sharks by 2032. The wild population was formerly abundant, but a fishing industry that ballooned starting in the 1990s reduced the population to perhaps just 20 individuals.

== Population ==
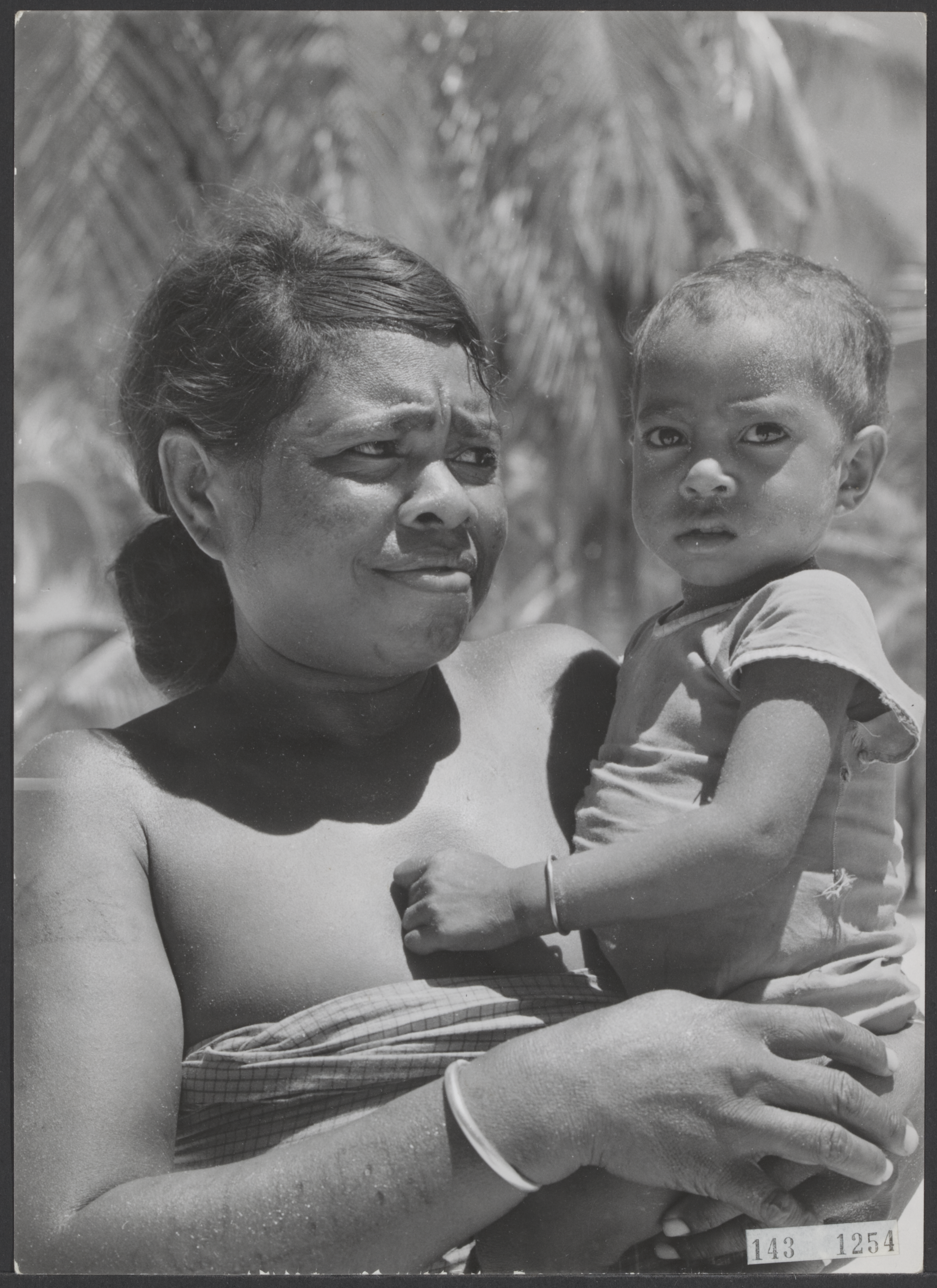
Ma'ya woman with her child, 1960s

The main occupation for people around this area is fishing since the area is dominated by the sea. They live in a small colony of tribes spread throughout the area. Although traditional culture is still strong, they are very welcoming to visitors. Raja Ampat people have similarities with the surrounding Moluccan people and Papuan people, as they speak Papuan and Austronesian languages. The Muslim proportion is much higher compared with other Papuan areas. However, the West Papua province as a whole has a larger Muslim population because of its extensive history with the Sultanate of Tidore.

Religion in Raja Ampat (2010)
1. Protestantism (67.3%)
2. Roman Catholicism (0.76%)
3. Islam (31.8%)
4. Hinduism (0.06%)
5. Buddhism (0.01%)

== Administration ==
Most of the islands make up the Raja Ampat Regency, a regency (kabupaten) forming part of Southwest Papua. It came into existence in 2004, before which the archipelago was part of Sorong Regency. The southern part of the island of Salawati is not part of the Raja Ampat Regency. Instead, it constitutes the Salawati Selatan and Salawati Tengah Districts of Sorong Regency.

Raja Ampat Regency is subdivided into the following districts (kecamatan):

Name	Land area in km^{2}	Population Census 2010	Population Census 2020	Population Estimate mid 2021	Administrative centre	No. of villages	No. of islands	Post code
Misool Selatan (South Misool)	91.16	3,026	3,504	3,532	Dabatan	5	295	98485
Misool Barat (West Misool)	336.84	1,291	1,498	1,510	Lilinta	5	79	98484
Misool (or Misool Utara)	1,235.68	1,761	2,017	2,031	Salafen	5	38	98483
Kofiau ^{(a)}	206.23	2,520	2,599	2,617	Mikiran	5	29	98482
Misool Timur (East Misool)	553.66	2,651	2,835	2,855	Folley	6	136	98486
Kepulauan Sembilan (Sembilan Islands)	17.21	1,458	1,458	1,468	Weijim Barat	4	16	98481
Total Raja Ampat Selatan	2,440.78	12,707	13,911	14,003		30	593	
Salawati Utara (North Salawati)	38.52	2,144	2,597	2,629	Samate	6	59	98495
Salawati Tengah ^{(b)} (Central Salawati)	572.47	1,917	1,992	2,017	Kalobo	10		98494
Salawati Barat (West Salawati)	502.47	899	1,121	1,138	Solol	4		98493
Batanta Selatan (South Batanta)	188.77	1,312	1,598	1,619	Yenanas	4		98491
Batanta Utara (North Batanta)	290.75	909	1,599	1,620	Yensawai Timur	4		98492
Total Raja Ampat Tengah	1,592.98	7,181	8,907	9,023		28	59	
Waigeo Selatan (South Waigeo)	240.12	1,715	2,173	2,210	Saonek	5	197	98475
Teluk Mayalibit (Mayalibit Bay)	218.87	846	1,297	1,318	Yenanas	4	34	98473
Meos Mansar	200.51	1,625	2,221	2,275	Yinbekwan	9		98472
Kota Waisai (Waisai Town)	621.93	6,976	21,797	22,541	Waisai	4		98471
Tiplol Mayalibit	121.87	930	1,171	1,190	Go	6		98474
Waigeo Barat (West Waigeo)	763.64	1,409	1,786	1,816	Waisilip	5	327	98464
Waigeo Barat Kepulauan (West Waigeo Islands)	103.30	2,084	2,768	2,828	Manyaifun	6	22	98465
Waigeo Utara (North Waigeo)	149.57	1,477	1,800	1,821	Kabare	6		98466
Warwarbomi	297.33	1,045	1,389	1,407	Warwanai	4		98467
Supnin	223.82	908	1,117	1,132	Rauki	4		98463
Kepulauan Ayau ^{(c)} (Ayau Islands)	12.66	1,230	1,092	1,097	Abidon	5		98462
Ayau ^{(c)}	5.83	989	1,103	1,108	Dorehkar	4	45	98461
Waigeo Timur (East Waigeo)	555.40	1,386	1,609	1,622	Urbinasopen	4	27	98476
Total Raja Ampat Utara	3,514.85	22,620	41,323	42,367		63	652	
Total Regency	7,559.60	42,508	64,141	65,403	Waisai	121	2,179	

Note: (a) including the Boo Islands, which lie some distance to the west of Kofiau. (b) Not to be confused with the Salawati Tengah District of Sorong Regency, the Salawati Tengah District of Rajah Ampat Regency actually forms the southeast portion of Salawati Island. (c) The Ayau Islands (including Ayau District) lie some distance to the north of Waigeo.

Taking account of the 2,757 people of Salawati Selatan and Salawati Tengah Districts, which are administratively in Sorong Regency, the total population of the archipelago added up to 69,596 in mid 2022.

There are proposals to divide the current Raja Ampat Regency into three, with Waigeo and its surrounding small islands forming a new North Raja Ampat Regency (Kabupaten Raja Ampat Utara), and with Misool and Kofiau and their surrounding small islands forming a new South Raja Ampat Regency (Kabupaten Raja Ampat Selatan), leaving the residue of the existing Regency to cover the northern part of Salawati Island (the rest of Salawati Island still lies within Sorong Regency) and Batanta Island (which forms Selat Sagawin District).

== See also ==
- Raja Ampat languages
