= Sayosa =

District in Southwest Papua, Indonesia

- District
- Interactive map of Sayosa
- Coordinates: 1°0′41.6657″S 131°45′34.4182″E
- Country: Indonesia
- Province: Southwest Papua
- Regency: Sorong
- District seat: Sayosa

Area
  - Total: 398.19 km^{2} (153.74 sq mi)

Population (2020)
  - Total: 1,020
  - Density: 2.56/km^{2} (6.63/sq mi)
- Time zone: UTC+9 (EIT)
- Postal Code: 98453
- Villages: 6

Sayosa is a district in Sorong Regency, Southwest Papua, Indonesia.

== Geography ==
Sunook consists of 6 villages (kampung), namely:

- Sayosa
- Maladofok
- Yorbes
- Samusa
- Klamintu
- Klain
