= Sailolof =

- Town
- Location of the town in Western New Guinea Location of the town in Indonesia
- Coordinates: 1°15′S 130°46′E
- Country: Indonesia
- Province: Southwest Papua
- Regency: Sorong
- District: Salawati Selatan

Population (mid 2021 estimate)
  - Total: 581
- Time zone: UTC+9 (WIT)
- Postal code: 98424

Sailolof (also known as Kampung Sailolof) is a small port town in the province of Southwest Papua, Indonesia, some 1,686 miles from Jakarta. It is located on the west coast of Salawati Island in Sorong Regency. and is the administrative centre for the South Salawati District (Kecamatan Salawati Selatan) of Sorong Regency. Sailolof also constitutes a historic kingdom one of the Four Kings of Raja Ampat Islands in Southwest Papua. The town is located near the western coastal tip of the Bird's Head Peninsula.
