= Klabot =

District in Southwest Papua, Indonesia

- District
- Interactive map of Klabot
- Coordinates: 1°22′41.5693″S 131°47′1.5425″E
- Country: Indonesia
- Province: Southwest Papua
- Regency: Sorong
- District seat: Klabot

Area
  - Total: 394.32 km^{2} (152.25 sq mi)
- Time zone: UTC+9 (WIT)
- Postal Code: 98436
- Villages: 8

Klabot is a district in Sorong Regency, Southwest Papua, Indonesia.

== Geography ==
Klabot consists of eight villages (kampung), namely:

- Indiwi
- Klabot
- Mlat
- Mlawes
- Mlasfa
- Kanolo
- Somir
- Warkti
