= Wemak =

District in Southwest Papua, Indonesia

- District
- Interactive map of Wemak
- Coordinates: 1°5′46.1724″S 131°47′20.3935″E
- Country: Indonesia
- Province: Southwest Papua
- Regency: Sorong
- District seat: Saluk

Area
  - Total: 395.74 km^{2} (152.80 sq mi)
- Time zone: UTC+9 (EIT)
- Postal Code: 98455
- Villages: 6

Wemak is a district in Sorong Regency, Southwest Papua, Indonesia.

== Geography ==
Wemak consists of six villages (kampung), namely:

- Kamlin
- Klalin Mos
- Klawaren (Klawren)
- Kwari
- Saluk
- Woloin
