= Hobard =

District in Southwest Papua, Indonesia

- District
- Interactive map of Hobard
- Coordinates: 1.338355°S 131.835228°E
- Country: Indonesia
- Province: Southwest Papua
- Regency: Sorong

Area
  - Total: 345.03 km^{2} (133.22 sq mi)
- Time zone: UTC+09:00 (Eastern Indonesia Time)
- Postal Code: 98435

Hobard is an administrative district in Sorong Regency, Southwest Papua, Indonesia.

== Climate ==
Hobard has a tropical rainforest climate (Af) with high rainfall throughout the year. The following climate data is based on observations from the Sorong Meteorology Station.

Climate data for Hobard
| Month | Jan | Feb | Mar | Apr | May | Jun | Jul | Aug | Sep | Oct | Nov | Dec | Year |
|---|---|---|---|---|---|---|---|---|---|---|---|---|---|
| Average rainfall mm (inches) | 166.5 (6.56) | 299.9 (11.81) | 236.1 (9.30) | 108.7 (4.28) | 321.6 (12.66) | 403.3 (15.88) | 529.4 (20.84) | 653.0 (25.71) | 460.0 (18.11) | 230.8 (9.09) | 231.3 (9.11) | 186.2 (7.33) | 3,826.8 (150.68) |
Source: BPS Sorong Regency
