= Sunook =

District in Southwest Papua, Indonesia

- District
- Country: Indonesia
- Province: Southwest Papua
- Regency: Sorong
- District seat: Dasri

Area
  - Total: 347.04 km^{2} (133.99 sq mi)
- Time zone: UTC+9 (WIT)
- Postal Code: 98459
- Villages: 7

Sunook is a district in Sorong Regency, Southwest Papua, Indonesia.

== Geography ==
Sunook consists of 7 villages (kampung), namely:

- Bolwi
- Dasri
- Ketawas
- Masos
- Sulya
- Suus
- Warbo
