= Buk District, Sorong =

District in Southwest Papua, Indonesia

Buk
- District
- Interactive map of Buk
- Location Buk (Indonesia)
- Coordinates: 1°20′26.466″S 131°46′20.7228″E
- Country: Indonesia
- Province: Southwest Papua
- Regency: Sorong
- District seat: Buk

Area
  - Total: 345.03 km^{2} (133.22 sq mi)
- Time zone: UTC+9 (EIT)
- Postal Code: 98434
- Villages: 7

Buk is a district in Sorong Regency, Southwest Papua, Indonesia.

== Geography ==
Buk consists of seven villages (kampung), namely:

- Buk
- Mlakhan
- Klais
- Mimpe
- Tiklen
- Klahen
- Moos
