= Makbon =

District in Southwest Papua, Indonesia

- District
- Interactive map of Makbon
- Coordinates: 0°44′53.7828″S 131°32′26.4948″E
- Country: Indonesia
- Province: Southwest Papua
- Regency: Sorong
- District seat: Makbon

Area
  - Total: 690.06 km^{2} (266.43 sq mi)

Population (2020)
  - Total: 3,200
  - Density: 4.6/km^{2} (12/sq mi)
- Time zone: UTC+9 (EIT)
- Postal Code: 98452
- Villages: 16

Makbon is a district in Sorong Regency, Southwest Papua, Indonesia.

== Geography ==
Makbon consists of one urban village (kelurahan) and 15 rural villages (kampung), namely:

- Makbon ^{(k)}
- Asbaken
- Bainkete
- Batu Lubang
- Batu Lubang Pantai
- Klagulus
- Klasigi
- Klasimigik
- Kwadas
- Malagasih
- Malagufuk
- Malaumkarta
- Mibi
- Sawatuk
- Suatolo
- Teluk Dore
