= Ayau =

District in Southwest Papua, Indonesia

- district
- Interactive map of Ayau
- Coordinates: 0°23′49.469″N 131°8′17.810″E
- Country: Indonesia
- Province: Southwest Papua
- Regency: Raja Ampat Regency
- District seat: Abidon

Area
  - Total: 5.83 km^{2} (2.25 sq mi)

Population (2024)
  - Total: 1,490
  - Density: 256/km^{2} (662/sq mi)
- Time zone: UTC+9 (WIT)
- Regional code: 92.05.24
- Villages: 4

Ayau is a district in Raja Ampat Regency, Southwest Papua Province, Indonesia.

== Geography ==
Ayau consists of four villages, namely:

- Abidon
- Meosbekwan
- Reni
- Rutum
