= Sorong =

Capital and largest city of Southwest Papua, Indonesia

- City
- City of Sorong; Kota Sorong
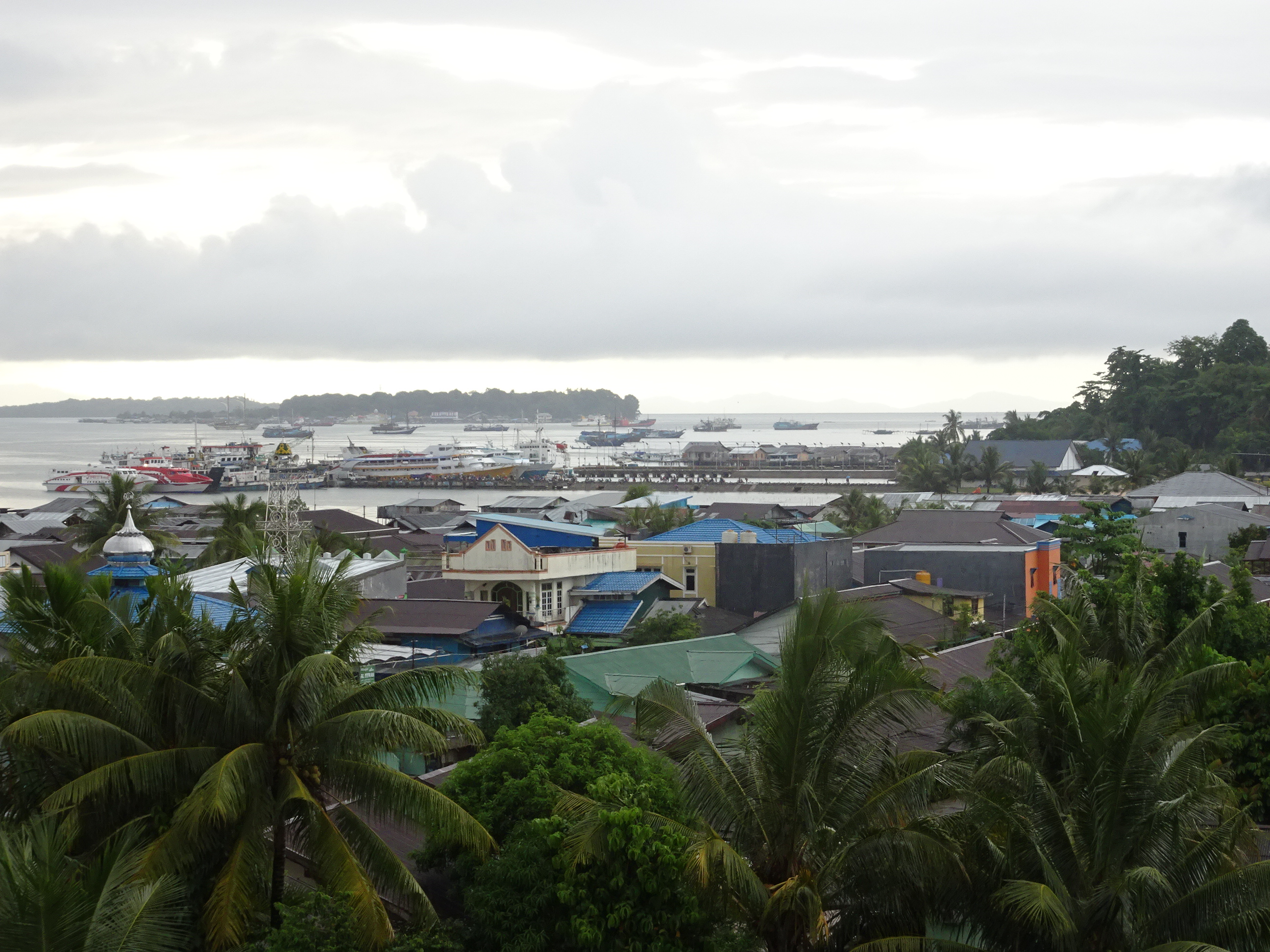
- Skyview of Sorong

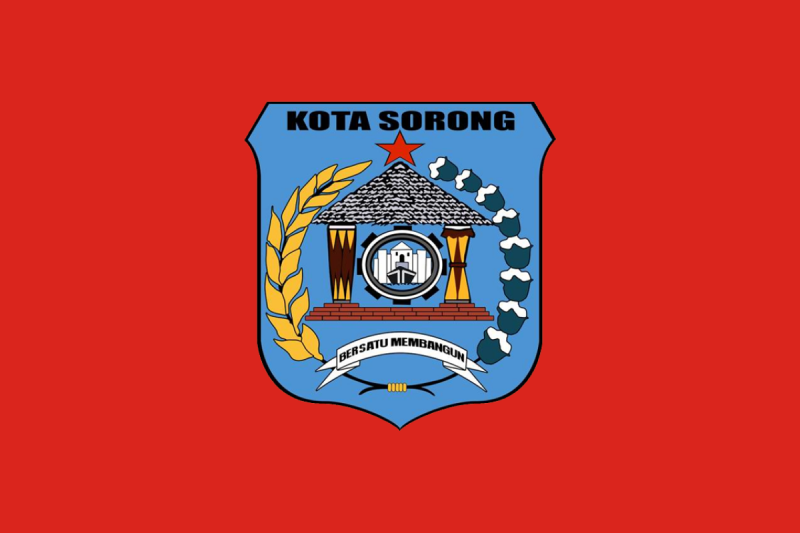
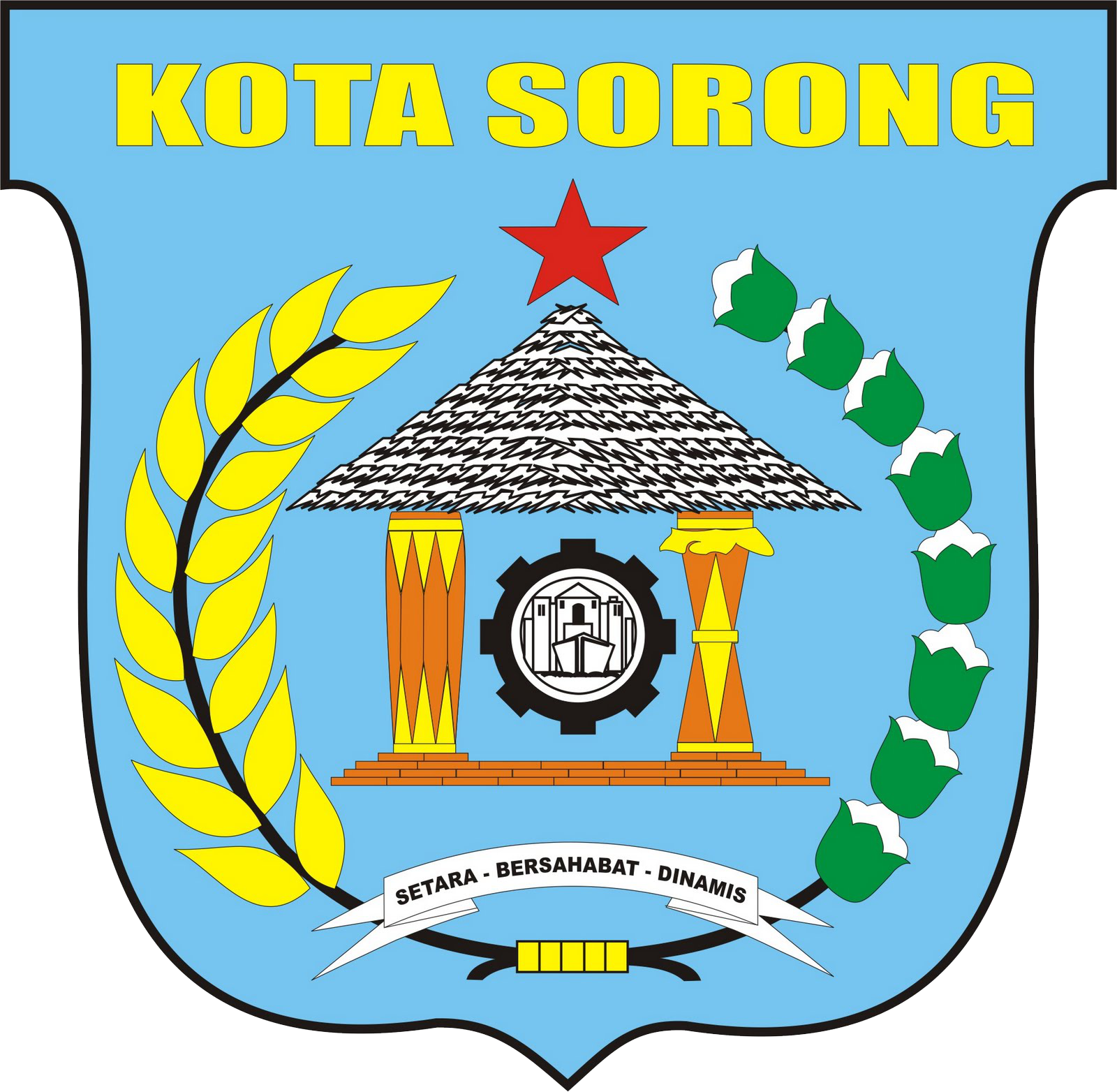
- Flag Coat of arms
- Motto: Setara – Bersahabat – Dinamis (Equal – Friendly – Dynamic)
- Location in Southwest Papua
- Interactive map of Sorong
- Location in Western New Guinea and Indonesia Sorong (Indonesia)
- Coordinates: 0°52′S 131°15′E
- Country: Indonesia
- Province: Southwest Papua

Government
  - Mayor: Septinus Lobat
  - Vice Mayor: Anshar Karim
  - Legislature: Sorong City House of Representatives

Area
  - Total: 1,105.50 km^{2} (426.84 sq mi)

Population (2010)
  - Total: 118,017
  - Estimate (2025): 219,958
  - Density: 106.754/km^{2} (276.493/sq mi)
- Time zone: UTC+9 (Indonesia Eastern Time)
- Postcodes: 98414
- Area code: (+62) 951
- Website: sorongkota.go.id

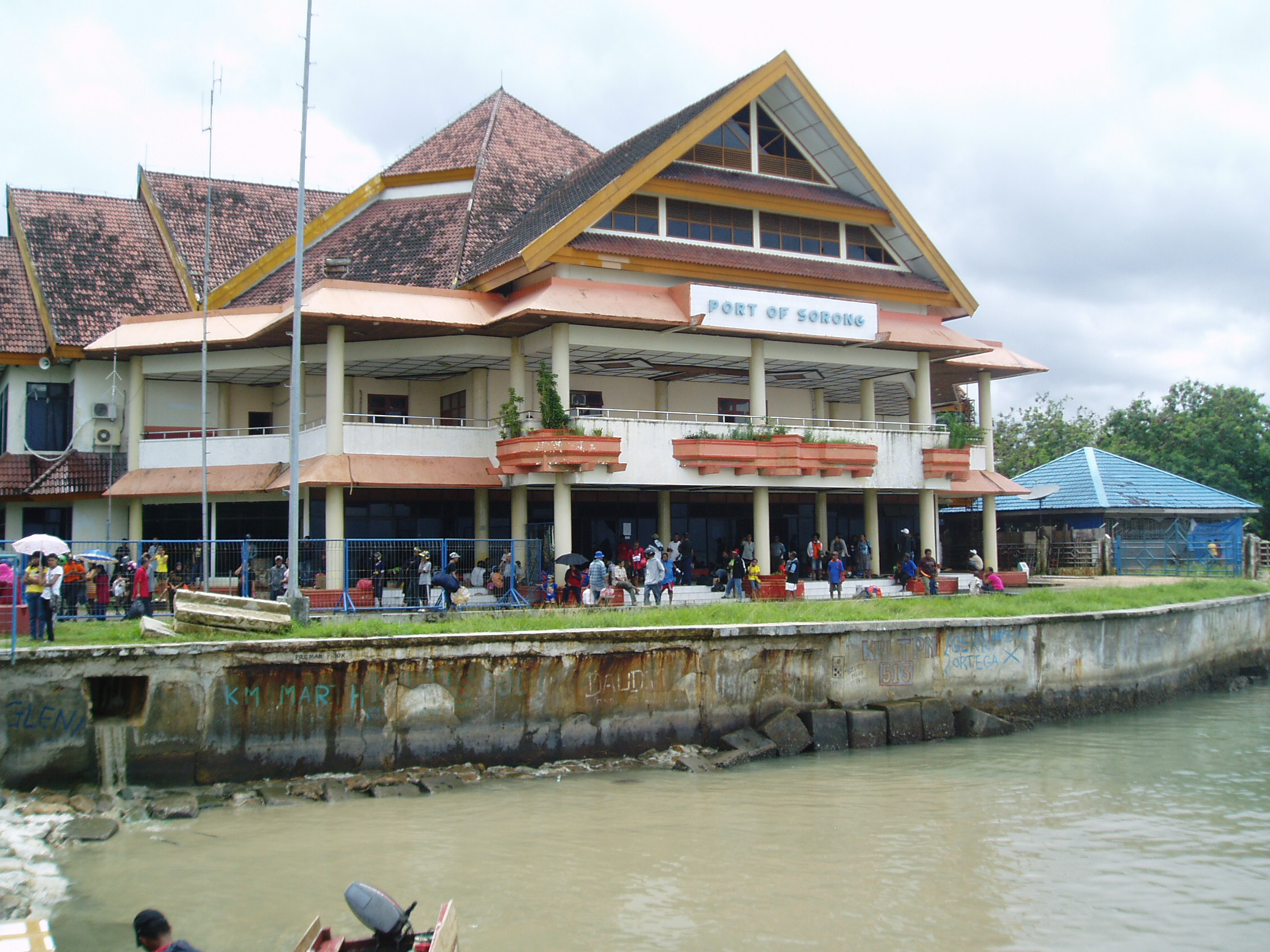
Port of Sorong

Sorong is the largest city and the capital of the Indonesian province of Southwest Papua. The city is located on the western tip of the island of New Guinea with its only land borders being with Sorong Regency. It is the gateway to Indonesia's Raja Ampat Islands, species rich coral reef islands in an area considered the heart of the world's coral reef biodiversity. It also is the logistics hub for Indonesia's thriving eastern oil and gas frontier. Sorong experienced rapid growth during the decade from 2010, and further growth is anticipated as Sorong becomes linked by road to other frontier towns in Papua's Bird's Head Peninsula. The official estimate of population as of mid 2024 was 286,028 - comprising 150,236 males and 135,729 females. The suburban area of Sorong city contains tropical rainforest and mangrove forest that has increasingly become popular as ecotourism attractions especially for birdwatching or wildlife watching.

== Etymology ==
The origin of Sorong's name comes from the word Soren, which means "deep and wavy ocean" in the Biak language. The name was first used by the Biak-Numfor people who sailed to different islands before they finally decided to settle down in Raja Ampat Islands. When the Biak-Numfor people came to the place called "Daratan Maladum", they decided to call it Soren. After centuries of contact with Chinese merchants, European missionaries, and people from Maluku and Sangihe-Talaud, the name underwent further change into Sorong.

== History ==
From the 15th century to the early 20th century, the Sultanate of Tidore claimed suzerainty over parts of Papua, including Sorong. During this period, Sorong primarily served as a small trading port for birds-of-paradise. It was also home to merchants of Chinese, Moluccan, Arab, and Bugis origins. Islam spread to the area from the Moluccas. The Italian naturalist Luigi d’Albertis, who visited Sorong in 1872, reported that the city's population was almost entirely Muslim.

Dutch influence over the region was minimal until the 20th century, when a colonial post was established on Doom Island in 1906, serving as the Dutch administrative center of the region. In the 1930s, the Dutch oil company Nederlandsch Nieuw Guinee Petroleum Maatschappij (NNGPM) had discovered oil off the coast of Sorong. The newly established oil fields led to the expansion of Dutch colonial influence in Western New Guinea, and had made Sorong into a valuable military target. During World War II, Sorong was occupied by the Empire of Japan in 1942, and would serve as the center of operations for Japanese forces during the Western New Guinea campaign. The Battle of Sansapor in June 1944 would effectively end Japanese control over the Bird's Head Peninsula, and by August 1944 any remaining Japanese presence in the region was removed by the US 6th Division. After the Indonesian War of Independence, the colonial administration would attempt to expand oil production with the construction of the 58 kilometer Klamono-Sorong pipeline. However, oil production declined after the war, and by 1961 oil production had dropped another 33%. This decline in production contributed to the demise of the Dutch colonial administration, as the Dutch administration over the territory could no longer be defended as economically viable. Under Indonesian administration, oil production would return to pre-war levels, and by 1967 production had more than trebled from 1961 levels. Today, the city still remains as one of the major oil and gas producers of Indonesian New Guinea.

In 1972, Sorong was reformed into an autonomous city, and then reformed into an administrative city in 1996. Administrative cities were abolished in 1999, granting Sorong full city status, and separating Sorong City from the Sorong Regency.

== Administrative districts ==
At the 2010 Census, the city comprised six districts (distrik), but the number has subsequently been increased to ten by the splitting of existing districts. These are tabulated below with their populations at the 2010 Census and 2020 Census, together with the official estimates for mid-2024. The table also includes the locations of the district administrative centres, the number of administrative villages or subdistricts (all classed as urban kelurahan, 41 in total) in each district, and its post code.

| Kode Kemendagri | Name of District (distrik) | Area in km^{2} | Pop'n 2010 Census | Pop'n 2020 Census | Pop'n mid 2024 Estimate | Admin centre | No. of villages | Post code |
|---|---|---|---|---|---|---|---|---|
| 92.71.03 | Sorong Barat (West Sorong) | 127.74 | 35,306 | 38,578 | 39,936 | Klawasi | 4 | 98412 |
| 92.71.10 | Maladum Mes ^{(a)} | 126.40 | ^{(b)} | 11,412 | 12,258 | Tanjung Kasuari | 4 | 98411 |
| 92.71.04 | Sorong Kepulauan ^{(c)} (Sorong Islands) | 200.11 | 9,711 | 11,801 | 13,351 | Doom Timur | 4 | 98413 |
| 92.71.02 | Sorong Timur (East Sorong) | 69.39 | 26,804 | 40,374 | 44,424 | Klamana | 4 | 98418 |
| 02.71.05 | Sorong Utara (North Sorong) | 127.21 | 45,001 | 37,029 | 39,503 | Malanu | 4 | 98410 |
| 92.71.01 | Sorong (district) | 48.81 | 31,264 | 19,083 | 18,216 | Remu | 4 | 98416 |
| 92.71.06 | Sorong Manoi | 135.97 | 42,539 | 55,482 | 56,268 | Malawei | 5 | 98415 |
| 92.71.08 | Klaurung | 88.83 | ^{(b)} | 15,145 | 16,801 | Klablim | 4 | 98417 |
| 92.71.09 | Malaimsimsa | 102.50 | ^{(b)} | 32,600 | 33,269 | Klabulu | 4 | 98419 |
| 92.71.07 | Sorong Kota (Sorong town) | 78.04 | ^{(b)} | 21,446 | 20,952 | Kampung Baru | 4 | 98414 |
| | Totals | 1,105.50 | 190,625 | 284,410 | 294,978 | | 41 | |

Note: (a) A coastal strip along the northern edge of the city. (b) the populations as of 2010 of the four new districts established after 2010 are included in the figures for the districts from which they were split off.
(c) Sorong Kepulauan District comprises 25 islands off the west coast of Sorong but within the city limits, including Doom, Soop, Raam and Umbre Islands.

== Demographics ==
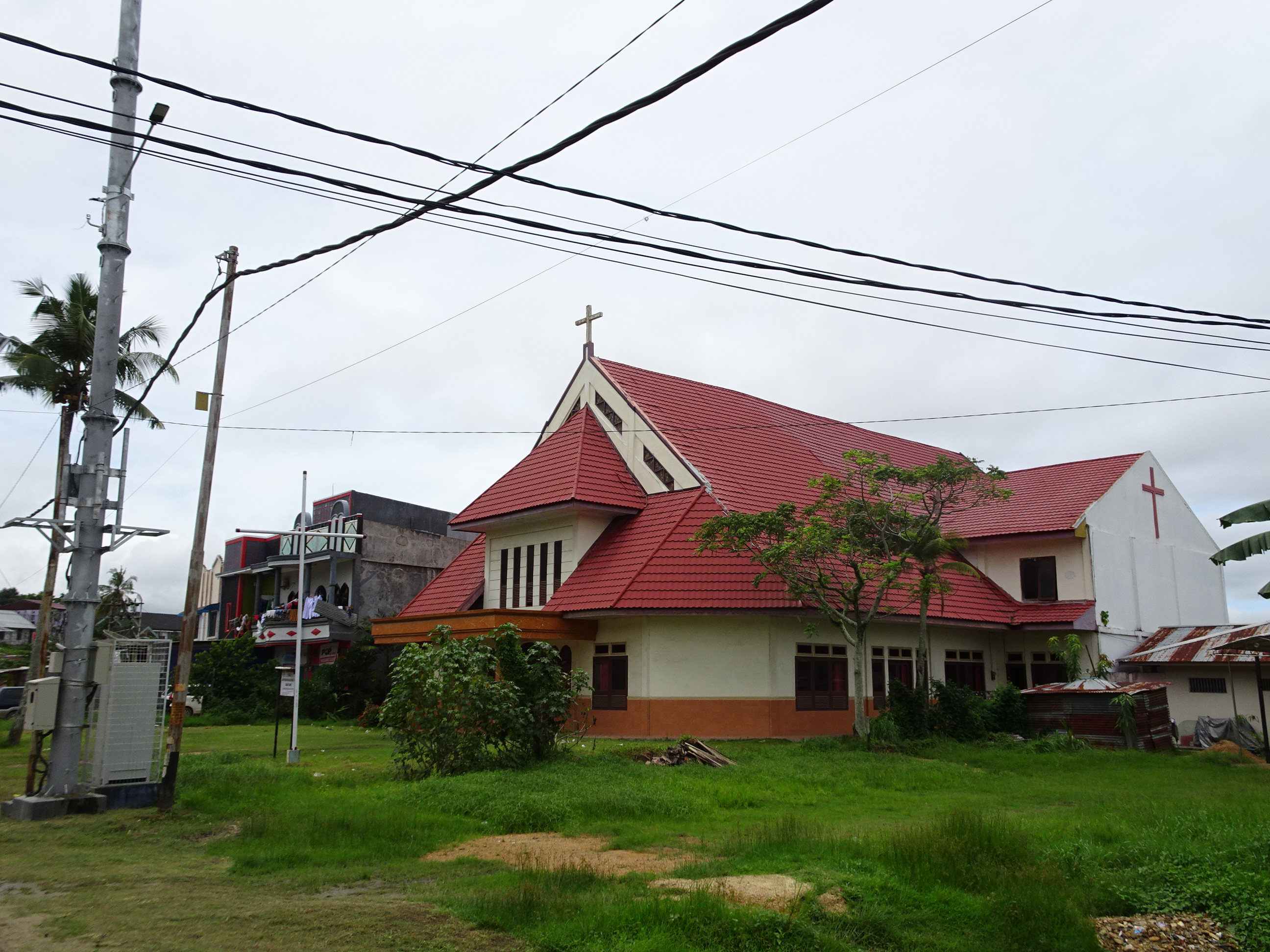
A Christian church in Sorong

The city had a population of 190,625 at the 2010 Census and 284,410 at the 2020 Census; the official estimate (as at mid 2023) was 286,028 (comprising 150,236 males and 135,729 females). In mid 2022, 54.89% of the city population were Christians, 44.82% were Muslims, and followed by minorities of Buddhists and Hindus.

== Climate ==
Sorong experiences a tropical rainforest climate (Köppen Af), as there is no real dry season throughout the year. The wettest month is June, with a total rainfall of 373 millimetres (14.7 in), while the driest month is February, with a total rainfall of 180 millimetres (7.1 in). The excessive rainfall is caused by the monsoon. The temperature variation remains constant throughout the year. The temperature difference between the hottest month and the coolest month is 1.2 °C (2.2 °F). The hottest month is November, with an average temperature of 27.8 °C (82.0 °F), while the coolest month is July, with an average temperature of 26.6 °C (79.9 °F).

Climate data for Sorong, West Papua
| Month | Jan | Feb | Mar | Apr | May | Jun | Jul | Aug | Sep | Oct | Nov | Dec | Year |
|---|---|---|---|---|---|---|---|---|---|---|---|---|---|
| Mean daily maximum °C (°F) | 30.6 (87.1) | 30.5 (86.9) | 30.5 (86.9) | 30.7 (87.3) | 30.6 (87.1) | 30.0 (86.0) | 29.4 (84.9) | 29.5 (85.1) | 29.9 (85.8) | 30.7 (87.3) | 31.0 (87.8) | 30.8 (87.4) | 30.4 (86.7) |
| Daily mean °C (°F) | 27.5 (81.5) | 27.4 (81.3) | 27.5 (81.5) | 27.6 (81.7) | 27.5 (81.5) | 27.1 (80.8) | 26.6 (79.9) | 26.7 (80.1) | 26.9 (80.4) | 27.5 (81.5) | 27.8 (82.0) | 27.6 (81.7) | 27.3 (81.1) |
| Mean daily minimum °C (°F) | 24.4 (75.9) | 24.4 (75.9) | 24.6 (76.3) | 24.5 (76.1) | 24.5 (76.1) | 24.3 (75.7) | 23.9 (75.0) | 23.9 (75.0) | 24.0 (75.2) | 24.3 (75.7) | 24.6 (76.3) | 24.5 (76.1) | 24.3 (75.7) |
| Average rainfall mm (inches) | 194 (7.6) | 180 (7.1) | 198 (7.8) | 243 (9.6) | 368 (14.5) | 373 (14.7) | 321 (12.6) | 277 (10.9) | 234 (9.2) | 207 (8.1) | 186 (7.3) | 188 (7.4) | 2,969 (116.8) |
| Average relative humidity (%) | 81 | 81 | 82 | 82 | 85 | 84 | 85 | 86 | 85 | 82 | 82 | 83 | 83 |
Source 1: Climate-Data.org (average temps & precipitation)
Source 2: Weatherbase (humidity)

== Economy ==
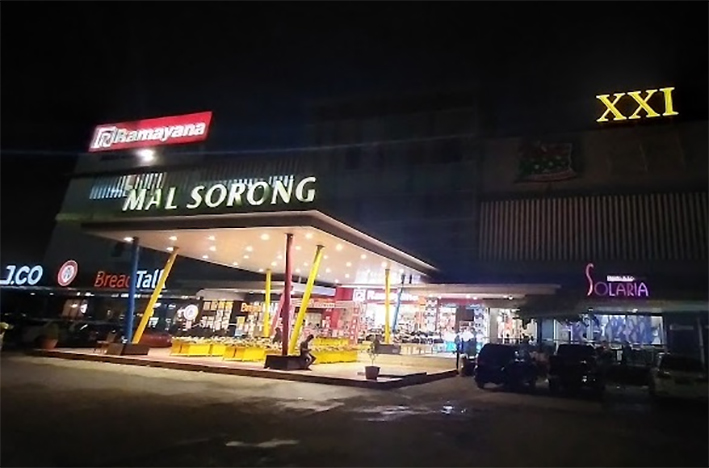
A shopping center in Sorong

A container port was built in Sorong with an annual container-handling capacity of 500,000 twenty-foot equivalent units (TEUs) at a cost of Rp.800 billion (US$93.6 million). Construction began in early 2012 and was intended to be completed in mid-2013, but was delayed and was inaugurated on 20 September 2021.

The state-owned oil company Pertamina operates a dockyard in Sorong. The city is served by Domine Eduard Osok Airport.

== In popular culture ==
The phrase "Sorong to Samarai" is commonly used throughout Papua New Guinea and Indonesian Papua to express solidarity and oneness and makes reference to both Sorong, a town in Southwest Papua, Indonesia and Samarai, a small township being one of the easternmost point located in Milne Bay Province, Papua New Guinea. It is sometimes used by Papuan independence activists in reference to Papuan unification, in opposition to the common Indonesian phrase of "Sabang to Merauke". In 2016, the ARIA Music Awards-nominated Papua New Guinean-Australian musician Airileke released a single titled "Sorong Samarai".

=== Cooperation and friendship ===
In addition to its sister cities, Sorong cooperates with:

- Baltimore, United States
- Busan, South Korea
- Fukuoka, Japan
