= Sorong Regency =

Regency in Southwest Papua, Indonesia

Sorong Regency Kabupaten Sorong
- Regency
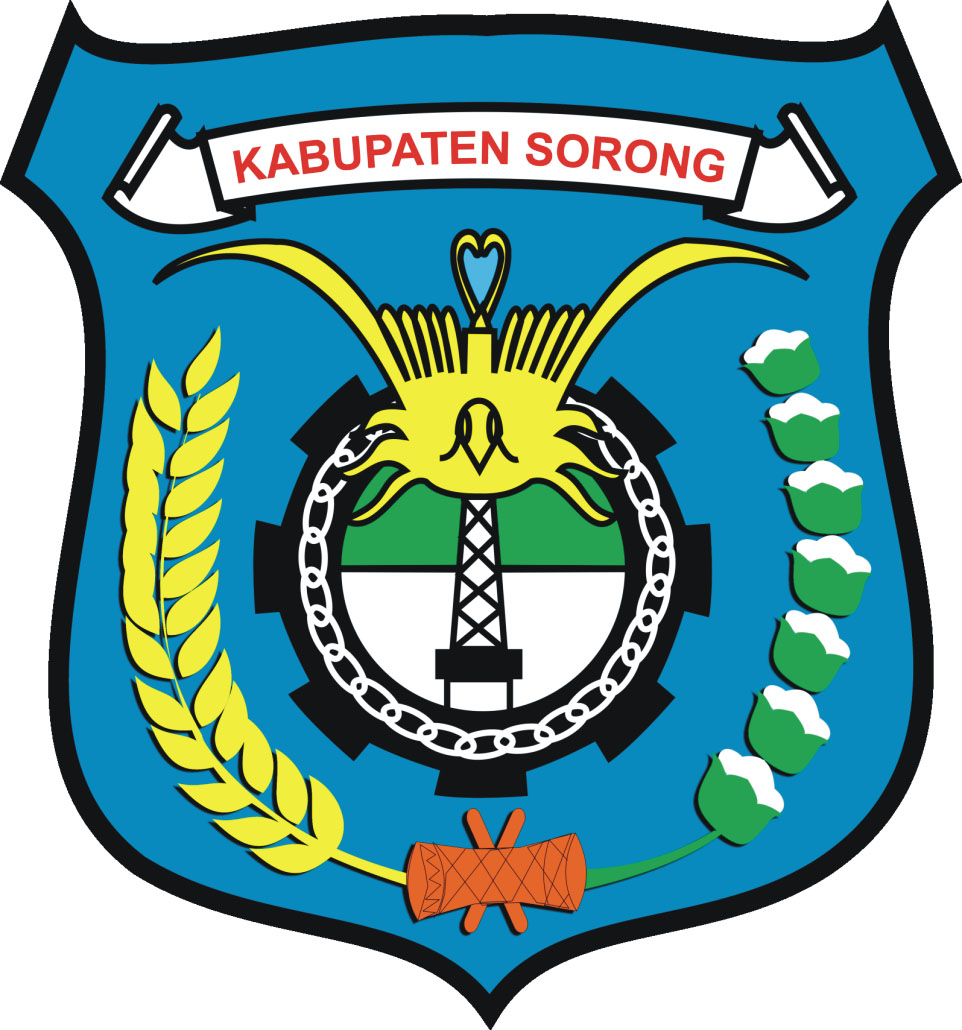
- Coat of arms

- Location in Southwest Papua

- Location in Indonesia
- Coordinates: 0°52′59″S 131°15′00″E
- Country: Indonesia
- Province: Southwest Papua
- Capital: Aimas

Government
  - Regent: Johny Kamuru
  - Vice Regent: Sutedjo

Area
  - Total: 13,075.28 km^{2} (5,048.39 sq mi)

Population (mid 2024 estimate)
  - Total: 129,669
  - Density: 9.91711/km^{2} (25.6852/sq mi)
- Time zone: UTC+9 (Indonesia Eastern Time)
- Area code: (+62) 951
- Website: sorongkab.go.id

Sorong Regency (Indonesian: Kabupaten Sorong) is a regency of the Southwest Papua province of Indonesia. It covers an area of 13,075.28 km^{2}, and had a population of 70,619 at the 2010 Census, and 118,679 at the 2020 Census; the official estimate as of mid-2024 was 129,669 (comprising 67,118 males and 62,551 females). Its administrative centre is the town of Aimas. Sorong Regency surrounds Sorong City (Kota) on the landward side; the city is administratively independent of the Regency and is not included in the above statistics; Sorong City has an airport, Sorong Airport, which also serves the Regency.

== Geography ==
Sorong Regency is one of the regencies which is administratively included in the territory of the new Southwest Papua Province. Sorong Regency is located at 00° 33' 42” - 01° 35' 29" South Latitude and 130° 40' 49" - 132° 13' 48” East Longitude.

== Administrative districts ==
At the time of the 2010 Census, the Sorong Regency was divided into eighteen administrative districts (distrik). However, since 2013 Moraid District has been transferred to the expanded Tambrauw Regency, while thirteen additional districts have been created in Sorong Regency by the division of existing districts. Thus Sorong Regency now comprises thirty districts (kecamatan), tabulated below with their populations at the 2010 Census and 2020 Census, together with the official estimates as of mid-2024.

The table also includes the locations of the district administrative centres, the number of administrative villages in each district (totaling 231 rural kampung and 26 urban kelurahan), and its postcode.

Kode Kememdagri	Name of District (distrik)	Area in km^{2}	Pop'n Census 2010	Pop'n Census 2020	Pop'n Estimate mid 2024	Admin centre	No. of villages	Post code
92.01.41	Klaso	345.03	306	574	1,244	Siwis	7	98456
92.01.48	Saengkeduk	395.74	^{(a)}	537	931	Suye	6	98458
92.01.01	Makbon	690.06	2,130	3,200	3,680	Makbon	15 ^{(b)}	98452
92.01.40	Klayili	394.32	416	1,147	1,320	Klayili	8	98451
92.01.04	Beraur	540.77	1,007	882	1,041	Wanurian	13	98432
92.01.44	Bagun	443.61	^{(a)}	427	629	Disfra	9	98431
92.01.54	Botain	349.74	^{(a)}	119	415	Mamsit	4	98433
92.01.08	Klamono	488.45	4,483	5,625	4,736	Klawana	10	98441
92.01.51	Klasafet	246.45	^{(a)}	986	1,394	Maladuk	5	98442
92.01.49	Malabotom	443.61	^{(a)}	1,085	1,119	Tanah Tinggi	9	98443
92.01.17	Klabot	394.32	638	595	866	Klabot	8	98436
92.01.47	Buk	345.03	^{(a)}	665	821	Buk	7	98434
92.01.18	Klawak	591.48	597	791	1,017	Wilty	12	98437
92.01.50	Konhir	394.32	^{(a)}	560	725	Tarsa	8	98438
92.01.52	Hobard	345.03	^{(a)}	351	421	Hobard	7	98435
92.01.05	Salawati ^{(c)}	345.03	9,149	12,091	12,491	Katinim	7 ^{(d)}	98423
92.01.13	Mayamuk	541.19	9,983	14,321	15,573	Makbalim	11 ^{(e)}	98421
92.01.42	Moisigin (formerly East Salawati) ^{(c)}	443.61	1,952	3,581	3,921	Klafdalim	9	98422
92.01.06	Seget	443.61	3,087	4,233	4,936	Seget	9	98426
92.01.12	Segun	443.61	1,369	1,634	1,815	Segun	9	98427
92.01.14	Salawati Selatan ^{(f)} (South Salawati)	295.74	2,057	1,212	1,468	Sailolof	6	98424
92.01.53	Salawati Tengah ^{(f)} (Central Salawati)	492.90	^{(g)}	1,529	1,890	Waliam	10	98425
92.01.07	Aimas	690.06	19,911	42,014	43,539	Aimas	14 ^{(h)}	98444
92.01.39	Mariat	542.19	10,432	16,735	18,599	Mariat	11^{(j)}	98445
92.01.43	Sorong (district)	443.61	^{(a)}	785	984	Maibo	9	98446
92.01.10	Sayosa	398.19	988	1,020	1,478	Sayosa	6	98453
92.01.45	Wemak	395.74	^{(a)}	725	937	Saluk	6	98455
92.01.55	Sayosa Timur (East Sayosa)	395.74	^{(a)}	406	557	Sailala	6	98454
92.01.20	Maudus	443.61	^{(a)}	467	602	Luwelala	9	98457
92.01.46	Sunook	347.04	^{(a)}	382	520	Dasri	7	98459
	Totals	13,075.28	68,902	118,679	129,669	Aimas	257	

While the areas given above for the districts are exactly as given in BPS official statistics, they are highly questionable (note the repetition of certain values).

Notes: (a) the 2010 population of the new districts is included with the figures for the districts from which they were separated.
(b) includes 1 kelurahan (Makbon - the district centre).
(c) Notwithstanding the names, Salawati District and Salawati Timur District - the latter now called Moisigin district - do not lie on Salawati Island, but on the Papuan 'mainland'.
(d) comprises 4 kelurahan (Katinim, Mararan, Majener, and Matawolat) and 3 kampung.
(e) comprises 3 kelurahan (Makbalim, Makbosun, and Mayamuk) and 8 kampung.
(f) Salawati Selatan District and Salawati Tengah District are situated on the island of Salawati and are thus geographically part of the Raja Ampat island group.
Note particularly that Raja Ampat Regency also contains a district on Salawati Island which is confusingly also named "Salawati Tengah".
(g) the 2010 population of the new Salawati Tengah District is included with the figure for Salawati Selatan District from which it was separated.
(h) comprises 11 kelurahan (Aimas, Klabinain, Klafma, Klaigit, Malagusa, Malasom, Malawele, Malawili, Mariat Gunung, Mariat Pantai, and Warmon) and 3 kampung.
(j) comprises 7 kelurahan (Jamaimo, Klamalu, Klamasen, Klaru, Klasukuk, Maklalut, and Mariyai) and 4 kampung.

== Climate ==
Aimas, the seat of the regency has a tropical rainforest climate (Af) with heavy to very heavy rainfall year-round. Unlike most parts of Indonesia, it experiences a rainfall maximum during the low-sun season due to local wind currents.

Climate data for Aimas
Month	Jan	Feb	Mar	Apr	May	Jun	Jul	Aug	Sep	Oct	Nov	Dec	Year
Mean daily maximum °C (°F)	30.6 (87.1)	30.5 (86.9)	30.5 (86.9)	30.6 (87.1)	30.5 (86.9)	29.9 (85.8)	29.3 (84.7)	29.3 (84.7)	29.8 (85.6)	30.6 (87.1)	30.9 (87.6)	30.7 (87.3)	30.3 (86.5)
Daily mean °C (°F)	27.4 (81.3)	27.3 (81.1)	27.4 (81.3)	27.4 (81.3)	27.4 (81.3)	27.0 (80.6)	26.5 (79.7)	26.4 (79.5)	26.8 (80.2)	27.3 (81.1)	27.6 (81.7)	27.6 (81.7)	27.2 (80.9)
Mean daily minimum °C (°F)	24.2 (75.6)	24.1 (75.4)	24.4 (75.9)	24.2 (75.6)	24.3 (75.7)	24.1 (75.4)	23.7 (74.7)	23.6 (74.5)	23.8 (74.8)	24.0 (75.2)	24.3 (75.7)	24.3 (75.7)	24.1 (75.4)
Average rainfall mm (inches)	215 (8.5)	205 (8.1)	223 (8.8)	258 (10.2)	392 (15.4)	390 (15.4)	348 (13.7)	317 (12.5)	272 (10.7)	233 (9.2)	201 (7.9)	205 (8.1)	3,259 (128.5)
Source: Climate-Data.org
