= List of straits =

This list of straits is an appendix to the article strait. For "Strait of.." or for "The.. " see the first letter of the word which follows the article.

A strait being a narrow passageway connecting two large bodies of water. Most commonly, the strait is a narrow channel that lies between two land masses

Strait	Location	Depth (meters)	Min. width (meters)	Max. width (meters)	Known crossings
Agate Pass	Part of Puget Sound. Separates Bainbridge Island from the mainland of the Kitsap Peninsula near Suquamish	6.1	91	375	Agate Pass Bridge
Agattu Strait	Attu Island and Agattu Island in the Alaskan Aleutians	-	-	-	-
Akashi Strait	Connects Seto Inland Sea and Osaka Bay.Separates Honshu from Awaji Island, Japan	110	-	4,000	Akashi Kaikyo Bridge
Alas Strait	Separates Lombok and Sumbawa, two islands of Indonesia	-	-	-	-
Alor Strait	Divides the Solor Archipelago from the Alor Archipelago, in the Lesser Sunda Islands of Indonesia	-	-	-	-
Amchitka Pass	It is the largest pass in the Aleutian Islands Alaskan	1,800	-	80,000	-
Anegada Passage	In the Caribbean Sea. Separates the Virgin Islands and Anguilla	2,300	-	127,000	-
Anguilla Channel	In the Caribbean Sea. Separates Anguilla and Saint Martin	-	-	-	Ferry service from Marigot, Saint Martin
Arthur Kill	Separates Staten Island and New Jersey	-	-	-	Goethals Bridge, Outerbridge Crossing, and the Arthur Kill Vertical Lift Bridge
Augusta's Strait	Aka. Dampier Strait (Indonesia), between the Raja Ampat islands of Waigeo and Batanta, province of West Papua	-	-	-	-
Bab-el-Mandeb	Between Yemen on the Arabian Peninsula and Djibouti and Eritrea in the Horn of Africa, connecting the Red Sea to the Gulf of Aden and by extension the Indian Ocean	186	26,000	-	-
Bab Iskender	The eastern section of the Bab-el-Mandeb straits	330	6,400	24,000	-
Balabac Strait	Connects the South China Sea with the Sulu Sea. It separates Balabac Island (Palawan province), Philippines, from Balambangan and the Banggi Islands north of Borneo	100	50,000	-	-
Bali Strait	Separating Java and Bali while connecting the Indian Ocean and the Bali Sea	60	2,400	-	Ferry between Ketapang in Java
Baltiysk strait	Connects Vistula Bay and Gdańsk Bay	12	400	-	-
Bangka Strait	Separates Sumatra and Bangka Island (also: Banca, Banka)	27	14,000	48,000	-
Banks Strait	Separates Cape Barren Island/Clarke Island and Tasmania	-	-	-	-
Barbuda Passage	In the Caribbean Sea. Separates Antigua from Barbuda	-	-	-	Ferry between St. John's Harbour and River Dock
Bashi Channel	Between the Batanes Islands, Philippines and Orchid Island of Taiwan	-	-	-	-
Basilan Strait	Lies between Mindanao and Basilan in the Philippines	-	-	-	-
Bass Strait	Divides Mainland Australia and Tasmania	155	-	350,000	Spirit of Tasmania
Beagle Channel	Separates the larger main island of Isla Grande de Tierra del Fuego from various smaller islands	-	4,800	-	-
Belle Isle strait	Separates Labrador, Canada from the island of Newfoundland	-	15,000	60,000	Proposed: Newfoundland–Labrador fixed link
Bering Strait	Connects the Pacific and Arctic oceans, separating the Chukchi Peninsula of the Russian Far East from the Seward Peninsula of Alaska	90	82,000	-	Proposed: Bering Strait crossing
Bohai Strait	Connects the Bohai Sea and Yellow Sea. Separates the Liaodong Peninsula, and the Shandong Peninsula	80	-	-	-
Bonifacio strait	Separates Corsica and Sardinia	100	11,000	-	-
Bosporus	Connects the Black Sea to the Sea of Marmara and separates Europe and Asia	100	700	-	15 July Martyrs Bridge, Fatih Sultan Mehmet Bridge, Yavuz Sultan Selim Bridge, and Eurasia Tunnel
Bougainville Strait	Separates Choiseul Island, part of Solomon Islands, from Bougainville Island, part of Papua New Guinea	-	-	-	-
Boundary Pass	British Columbia and Washington state. It connects Haro Strait to the south with the Strait of Georgia to the north	-	-	23,000	-
Bransfield Strait	Divides South Shetland Islands and the Antarctic Peninsula	2,000	-	100,000	-
Bungo Channel	Separates Kyūshū and Shikoku	-	-	-	-
Burias Pass	Separates Bicol Peninsula and Burias Island in the Philippines	-	-	-	-
Cabot Strait	Separates Newfoundland and Cape Breton Island in Canada	550	-	130,000	-
Caicos Passage	The Caicos Islands are separated by the Caicos Passage from the closest Bahamian islands, Mayaguana and Great Inagua	-	-	-	-
Canso strait	Separates mainland Nova Scotia and Cape Breton Island, in eastern Canada	61	1,000	-	-
Cebu Strait (a.k.a. Bohol Strait)	Connects the western part of the Bohol Sea with the Camotes Sea, and separates the island provinces of Cebu and Bohol.	-	-	-	-
Chatham Strait	Separates Chichagof Island and Baranof Island to its west from Admiralty Island and Kuiu Island on its east in Alaska	-	5,000	16,000	-
Chios Strait	Separates the Greek island of Chios from the Anatolian mainland and from the Aegean Region of Turkey	-	-	-	-
Clarence Strait	Separates Prince of Wales Island, on the west side, from Revillagigedo Island and Annette Island, on the east side	-	5,556	-	-
Colvos Passage	Part of Puget Sound. Separates Vashon Island and the Kitsap Peninsula	-	-	-	-
Cook Strait	New Zealand, between the North Island and the South Island	128	22,000	-	Ferry services run between Picton in the Marlborough Sounds and Wellington
Corfu Strait	Separates Corfu and mainland Greece/Albania	-	-	-	-
Cozumel Channel	Separate Cozumel Island and the Yucatán Peninsula	-	-	-	-
Cross Sound	Chichagof Island to its south and the mainland to its north, of Alaska	-	-	-	-
Dalcahue Channel	Part of the Sea of Chiloé that separates Quinchao Island from Chiloé Island, Chile	-	-	-	-
Dalco Passage	Part of Puget Sound. Separates Vashon Island and the mainland near Tacoma, USA	-	-	-	-
Dampier Strait (Indonesia) (sometimes also known as Augusta's Strait)	Separates the Raja Ampat islands of Waigeo and Batanta, Indonesia	-	-	-	-
Dampier Strait (Papua New Guinea)	Separates Umboi Island and New Britain, PNG	-	-	-	-
Danish Straits	Refers collectively to the Danish Straits Oresund, Fehmarn Belt, Little Belt and Great Belt between Scandinavia and Jutland	-	-	-	Little Belt Bridge, Storstrøm Bridge, Siøsund Bridge, New Little Belt Bridge, Alssund Bridge, Great Belt Bridge, Øresund Bridge
Dardanelles	Connects the Sea of Marmara with the Aegean and Mediterranean seas. Separates Europe and Asia	103	1,200	6,000	1915 Çanakkale Bridge
Davis Strait	Separates Baffin Island and Greenland	-	-	-	-
Deception Pass	Part of Puget Sound. Separates Whidbey Island in Island County, to Fidalgo Island	-	-	-	Deception Pass Bridge
Denmark Strait	Connects the Greenland Sea, an extension of the Arctic Ocean, to the Irminger Sea, a part of the Atlantic Ocean.Separates Greenland from Iceland	191	290,000	-	-
La Désirade Passage	In the Caribbean Sea. Separates the island of la Désirade, from Grande-Terre (Guadeloupe)	-	-	-	-
Detroit River	Connects Lake St. Clair and Lake Erie. Separates the province of Ontario, Canada, and the state of Michigan, USA (The word "détroit" is French for "strait")	16.2	800	4,000	Ambassador Bridge, Detroit–Windsor Tunnel, and Michigan Central Railway Tunnel
Dixon Entrance	Separates Haida Gwaii from the Alexander Archipelago. The Dixon Entrance is part of the Inside Passage shipping route.	-	-	-	-
Dolphin and Union Strait	Connects the Amundsen Gulf, to the Coronation Gulf. Separates Nunavut (Kitikmeot Region), Canada from Victoria Island	-	32,000	64,000	-
Dominica Passage	In the Caribbean Sea. Separates the islands of Dominica and Marie-Galante, Guadeloupe	-	-	-	-
Dover Straits	The narrowest part of the English Channel	223	33,000	-	The Channel Tunnel
Dragon's Mouths (Bocas del Dragón)	Connects the Gulf of Paria to the Caribbean Sea. Separates Trinidad and Venezuela	-	-	-	-
Drake Passage	Connects Atlantic Ocean (Scotia Sea) with the southeastern part of the Pacific Ocean. Separates Cape Horn in Chile at the southern extreme of the South American mainland and the South Shetland Islands of Antarctica	5,000	800,000	-	-
East River	Connects Upper New York Bay to Long Island Sound. Separates Long Island from Manhattan Island, and from the North American mainland	51	-	-	Brooklyn Bridge, Williamsburg Bridge, the Queensboro Bridge, the Manhattan Bridge, the Hell Gate Railroad Bridge, the Triborough Bridge, the Bronx-Whitestone Bridge, the Throgs Neck Bridge and the Rikers Island Bridge
Eastern Channel (a.k.a Tsushima Strait)	A channel of the Korea Strait, which lies between Korea and Japan, connecting the Sea of Japan, the Yellow Sea, and the East China Sea	140	65,000	-	-
English Channel	Great Britain and France	174	34,000	240,000	Channel Tunnel
Euripus Strait	Separates the Greek island of Euboea in the Aegean Sea from Boeotia in mainland Greece	-	38	-	Euripus Bridge
Falkland Sound	Separates West Falkland and East Falkland	-	-	-	-
Fehmarn Belt	Connecting the Bay of Kiel and the Bay of Mecklenburg in the Baltic Sea. Separates the German island of Fehmarn and the Danish island of Lolland	30	18,600	-	Fehmarn Belt Fixed Link
Fehmarn Sound	Separates Fehmarn and the German mainland	-	-	-	Fehmarn Belt Fixed Link
Fisher Strait	Separates Southampton Island (to the northwest) from Coats Island	-	-	-	-
Florida strait	Separates Florida and Cuba. Connects the Gulf of Mexico with the Atlantic Ocean	1,800	150,000	-	-
Foveaux Strait	Separates Stewart Island / Rakiura from the South Island of New Zealand	56	23,000	53,000	Stewart Island § Transport
Foxe Channel	Canada: the Foxe Basin (to the north) from Hudson Bay and the Hudson Strait (to the south)	-	-	-	-
Freeman Strait	Separating Barentsøya, to the north, from Edgeøya, in the Svalbard archipelago, Norway	-	-	-	-
Frozen Strait	Connects Roes Welcome Sound in the west, with Foxe Basin to the east	-	19,000	32,000	-
Fury and Hecla Strait	Separates Baffin Island to the north and the Melville Peninsula, Canada	-	2,000	20,000	-
Georgia strait	Separates Vancouver Island and mainland British Columbia	420	20,000	58,000	Vancouver Island fixed link
Gibraltar strait	Connects the Atlantic Ocean to the Mediterranean Sea and separates Europe from Africa	900	14,200	-	Proposed: Strait of Gibraltar crossing
Golden Gate Strait	Connects San Francisco Bay to the Pacific Ocean. Separates San Francisco Peninsula and the Marin Peninsula	115	4,800	-	Golden Gate Bridge
Great Belt	Between the major islands of Zealand (Sjælland) and Funen (Fyn) in Denmark. It is one of the three Danish Straits	60	16,000	32,000	Great Belt ferries, Great Belt Fixed Link
Guadeloupe Passage	In the Caribbean Sea. Separates Guadeloupe from Montserrat and from Antigua and Barbuda.	-	-	-	-
Gulf of Corryvreckan	Between the islands of Jura and Scarba, in Argyll and Bute, off the west coast of mainland Scotland	-	-	-	-
Gulf of Mannar	Separates India and Sri Lanka	1,335	-	275,000	-
Hall Basin	Between Ellesmere Island and Greenland	-	-	-	-
Harlem River	Separates the island of Manhattan the United States mainland	-	-	-	Wards Island Bridge, Robert F. Kennedy Triboro Lift Bridge, Willis Avenue Bridge, Third Avenue Bridge, Lexington Avenue Tunnel, Park Avenue Bridge, Madison Avenue Bridge, 149th Street Tunnel, 145th Street Bridge, Macombs Dam Bridge, Concourse Tunnel, Putnam Bridge, High Bridge, Alexander Hamilton Bridge, Washington Bridge, University Heights Bridge, Broadway Bridge, Henry Hudson Bridge, Spuyten Duyvil Bridge
Haro Straits	Connecting the Strait of Georgia to the Strait of Juan de Fuca, separating Vancouver Island and the Gulf Islands in British Columbia, Canada	-	-	19,000	-
Hecate Strait	Between Haida Gwaii and British Columbia	-	48,000	140,000	-
Honguedo Strait	Between the Gaspésie peninsula and Anticosti Island, Quebec, Canada	-	-	-	-
Hormuz strait	Connects between the Persian Gulf and the Gulf of Oman. Separating Oman and Iran	-	39,000	97,000	-
Hudson Strait	Links the Atlantic Ocean and the Labrador Sea to Hudson Bay in Canada. This strait lies between Baffin Island and Quebec	-	70,000	240,000	-
Indispensable Strait	Between Guadalcanal and Malaita	-	-	-	-
Irbe Strait	Connects the Gulf of Riga to the Baltic Sea, Separates the Sõrve Peninsula from the island Saaremaa in Estonia	-	27,000	-	-
Jamaica Channel	Separates Jamaica and Hispaniola in the Caribbean Sea	1,200	190,000	-	-
Johor Strait	Separates Singapore and Peninsular Malaysia	40	-	1,600	Johor–Singapore Causeway & Malaysia–Singapore Second Link
Jones Sound	Separate Devon Island and the southern end of Ellesmere Island, Canada	-	-	-	-
Juan de Fuca strait	Separates Vancouver Island, and Olympic Peninsula	100	19,000	40,000	MV Coho
Kalmar Strait	Between the Swedish island of Öland and the Swedish mainland	-	5,000	25,000	Öland Bridge
Kane Basin	Between Greenland and Ellesmere Island, Canada's northernmost	-	-	130,000	-
Kanmon Strait	Separating Honshu and Kyushu	-	-	-	Kanmon Tunnels & Kanmonkyo Bridge
Kara Strait	Between the southern end of Novaya Zemlya, Russia and the northern tip of Vaygach Island. This strait connects the Kara Sea and the Barents Sea in northern Russia	230	50,000	-	-
Karimata Strait	Connects the South China Sea to the Java Sea, separating the Indonesian islands of Belitung and Borneo (Kalimantan)	-	-	206,000	-
Kattegat	Separates Jutland and Halland and neighboring provinces	-	-	-	-
Kerch Strait	Connects the Black Sea and the Sea of Azov, separating the Kerch Peninsula of Crimea from Taman Peninsula of Russia's Krasnodar Krai	18	3,100	15,000	Crimean Bridge
Kildin Strait	Separating the island Kildin and the Kola Peninsula, Russia	-	-	-	-
Kill Van Kull	Between Staten Island and Bayonne, New Jersey	-	305	-	Bayonne Bridge
Kitan Strait	Separates Awaji Island from Honshu and connects the Osaka Bay in the north to the Kii Channel	-	-	11,000	-
Korea Strait	Separates Korea and Japan	100		200,000	Proposed: Japan–Korea Undersea Tunnel
Gulf of Ephesus (Kólpos Ephésou), or Gulf of Kuşadası	Separating the Greek island of Samos from the mainland of Turkey	-	-	-	-
Kvarken	Connects Bothnian Bay with the Bothnian Sea and Separates Sweden and Finland	25	-	70,000	The ferry route between Umeå and Vaasa connects Sweden and Finland
Lancaster Sound	Between Devon Island and Baffin Island, forming the eastern entrance to the Parry Channel and the Northwest Passage	-	-	-	-
Langeland's Belt	Langeland and Lolland	-	-	-	-
Lembeh Strait	Between Sulawesi and Lembeh islands in Indonesia	-	-	-	-
Little Belt	Between the island of Funen and the Jutland Peninsula in Denmark. It is one of the three Danish Straits that drain and connect the Baltic Sea to the Kattegat strait	81	800	28,000	Old Little Belt Bridge and the New Little Belt Bridge
Lombok Strait	Between Bali and Lombok, Indonesia. Part of the Wallace Line separating the Indomalayan and the Australasian Biogeographic realms	250	20,000	40,000	-
Luzon Strait	Between Taiwan and Luzon, Philippines and connects the Philippine Sea to the South China Sea	4,000	-	250,000	-
Mackinac strait	Connects Lake Michigan and Lake Huron. Separates Michigan's Upper and Lower Peninsulas	90	8,000	-	Mackinac Bridge
Magellan strait	Separates South America and Tierra del Fuego archipelago	-	2,000	-	-
Main Channel	Connects Lake Huron and Georgian Bay. Separates Ontario's Manitoulin Island and the Bruce Peninsula	-	-	-	-
Makassar Strait	Between the islands of Borneo and Sulawesi in Indonesia	-	-	-	-
Malacca Strait	Peninsular Malaysia and Sumatra, Indonesia	200	38,000	250,000	-
Maliku Kandu	Between the Maldives and India	-	-	-	-
Malta Channel	Separates Malta from the southern tip of Sicily	171	81,000	102,000	-
Maqueda Channel	Separating the island of Catanduanes from Luzon. The strait connects Lagonoy Gulf and the Philippine Sea	-	-	-	-
Marie-Galante Passage	Separates the island of Marie-Galante from Guadeloupe and Îles des Saintes	-	-	-	-
Martinique Channel	Separates Saint Vincent and the Grenadines and Grenada	-	-	-	-
Martinique Passage	Separates Dominica and Martinique	-	-	-	-
McClure Strait	Separates Melville Island and Banks Island. Connects the Beaufort Sea with Viscount Melville Sound	-	-	-	-
Menai Strait	Between Anglesey and mainland Wales	-	400	25,000	Menai Suspension Bridge & Britannia Bridge
Messina strait	Between Sicily and Italian peninsula	250	3,100	5,100	Planned: Strait of Messina Bridge
The Minch	Divides the Outer Hebrides from the mainland of Scotland	-	14,000	45,000	-
Mindoro Strait	Connecting the South China Sea with the Sulu Sea in the Philippines. It separates Mindoro Island from Busuanga Island	-	-	-	-
Mona Passage	Separates the islands of Hispaniola and Puerto Rico in the Greater Antilles of the Caribbean region	-	-	130,000	-
Mytilini Strait	Separates Mainland Turkey and the island of Lesbos	-	-	-	-
Myeongnyang Strait	Between Jindo Island and the Korean peninsula	-	293	-	Jindo Bridge
Nares Strait	Separates Ellesmere Island and Northern Greenland and connects Baffin Bay with Lincoln Sea / the Arctic Sea	600	-	35,000	-
The Narrows	Separates Staten Island and Brooklyn in New York City, U.S.A	-	-	-	Verrazzano–Narrows Bridge
Naruto Strait	Between Awaji Island and the island Shikoku in Japan	-	-	-	Ōnaruto Bridge
Nemuro Strait	Separating Kunashir Island of the Kuril Islands, Russia (claimed by Japan) from the Shiretoko Peninsula, Hokkaidō, Japan	2,500	-	24,000	-
Nicholas Channel	Between Cuba and the Bahamas	-	-	-	-
North Channel (British Isles)	Between Northern Ireland and Scotland	312	19,000	-	-
Northumberland Strait	Between Prince Edward Island and New Brunswick/Nova Scotia, Canada	65	13,000	-	Confederation Bridge
Old Bahama Channel	Between Cuba and the Bahamas	-	22,500	-	-
Ombai Strait	Separates the Alor Archipelago from the islands of Wetar, Atauro, and Timor in the Lesser Sunda Islands, Indonesia	3,250	27,000	-	-
Øresund	Divides Danish Zealand and Swedish Scania	40	4,000	28,000	Øresund Bridge
Otranto strait	Connects the Adriatic Sea with the Ionian Sea and divides Italy from Albania	18	72,000	-	-
Palk Strait	Separates India and Sri Lanka	35	64,000	137,000	-
Panama Canal	Connects the Caribbean Sea with the Pacific Ocean	12.6	33.5	-	Centennial Bridge & Bridge of the Americas
Parry Channel	Runs through the central Canadian Arctic Archipelago	-	-	-	-
Pearse Canal	Separates Alaska and islands of British Columbia	-	-	-	-
Pentland Firth	Separates Orkney archipelago and the mainland of Scotland	-	-	-	-
La Pérouse Strait (also Soya Strait)	Divides the Russian island of Sakhalin from the Japanese island of Hokkaidō, and connects the Sea of Japan with the Sea of Okhotsk	140	42,000	-	-
Pertuis d'Antioche	Separates western France from Île de Ré to the north, and Oléron to the south	-	-	-	-
Pickering Passage	Separates Hartstine Island from the mainland USA	-	-	-	-
Pitt Strait (Indonesia) (a.k.a. Sagewin Strait)	Separates the Raja Ampat islands of Batanta and Salawati, in Indonesia and links the Ceram Sea to the Pacific Ocean	-	-	-	-
Pitt Strait (New Zealand)	Chatham Island and Pitt Island in the Chatham Islands	-	-	25,000	-
Polillo Strait	Polillo Island and Luzon Island, Philippine archipelago	-	-	-	-
Port Washington Narrows	Puget Sound	-	-	-	-
Porte des Morts	Links Lake Michigan and Green Bay between the northern tip of the Door Peninsula and the southernmost of the Potawatomi Islands	-	-	-	-
Prince of Wales Strait	Separates Banks Island and Victoria Island in Canada	-	-	-	-
Prince Regent Inlet	West end of Baffin Island (Brodeur Peninsula) and Somerset Island on the west, of Canada	-	64,000	105,000	-
Qiongzhou Strait	Separates the island of Hainan and Guangdong, China	120	-	30,000	-
Queen Charlotte Strait	Separates Vancouver Island and the mainland of British Columbia, Canada	-	-	-	-
Rich Passage	Separates Bainbridge Island from the Manchester area of Kitsap Peninsula. In the Puget Sound	-	-	-	-
Robeson Channel	Separates Ellesmere Island and Greenland	-	18,000	29,000	-
Roes Welcome Sound	Between the mainland on the west and Southampton Island	-	24,000	113,000	-
Pitt Strait (Indonesia)	Separates the Raja Ampat islands of Batanta and Salawati and links the Ceram Sea to the Pacific Ocean	-	-	-	-
Saint-Barthélemy Channel	Between Saint Barthélemy and Saint Martin in the Caribbean Sea	-	-	-	-
St. Clair River	Links Lake Huron into Lake St. Clair, forming part of the international boundary between Canada and the United States	-	-	-	-
St George's Channel	Between Ireland and Wales	-	-	-	-
St George's Channel	Between New Britain and New Ireland in the Bismarck Archipelago, Papua New Guinea	-	-	-	-
Saint Lucia Channel	Between Martinique and Saint Lucia in the Caribbean Sea	-	-	-	-
St. Marys River	Between Lake Superior and Lake Huron / and the province of Ontario, Canada, and the state of Michigan, USA	-	-	-	Sault Ste. Marie International Railroad Bridge
Saint Vincent Passage	Between Saint Vincent and Saint Lucia in the Caribbean	-	-	37,000	-
Les Saintes Passage	Separates the archipelago of Îles des Saintes, from Basse-Terre Island (Guadeloupe)	-	-	12,500	-
Sakonnet River	Between Aquidneck Island and Tiverton and Little Compton, Rhode Island.	6.1	500	3,200	Sakonnet River Rail Bridge, Sakonnet River Bridge, Stone Bridge
San Bernardino Strait	Between Luzon and Samar in the Philippines	-	-	-	-
San Juanico Strait	Between Samar and Leyte islands in the Philippines	-	2,000	-	San Juanico Bridge
Scapa Flow	Between several of the Orkney islands	-	-	-	-
Serpent's Mouth	Between Trinidad and Venezuela	-	14,000	-	-
Shelikof Strait	Between the Alaska mainland to the west and Kodiak and Afognak islands to the east, in the USA	-	40,000	48,000	-
Sibutu Passage	Between Borneo and the Sulu Archipelago	-	-	29,000	-
Sicilian Strait	Between Sicily and Africa	316	-	145,000	-
Singapore Strait	Connects the Strait of Malacca and the South China Sea. Separates Singapore and Indonesia (Sumatra)	22	16,000	-	-
Skagerrak	Separating Denmark from Norway and Sweden	-	80,000	140,000	-
Skog Passage	West of Joinville Island, Antarctica	-	-	-	-
Smith Sound	Between Ellesmere Island (Canada) and Greenland	-	-	-	-
The Solent	Between the Isle of Wight and Hampshire	-	1,600	8,000	-
South Kvarken	Between the Finnish Åland and Sweden	-	-	30,000	-
La Pérouse Strait	Separates Sakhalin (Karafuto) (Russia) from Hokkaidō (Japan)	140	-	42,000	-
Sumba Strait	Between Flores and Sumba, Indonesia	-	-	-	-
Sunda Strait	Between Sumatra and Java	-	-	-	-
Surigao Strait	Between Leyte and Mindanao islands in the Philippines	-	-	25,000	-
The Swale	Between the Isle of Sheppey and the mainland of Kent, England	-	-	-	-
Tablas Strait	Between Mindoro and Panay islands in the Philippines	545	-	-	-
Tacoma Narrows	Separates the Kitsap Peninsula from the city of Tacoma in the Puget Sound	-	-	-	Tacoma Narrows Bridges (State Route 16)
Taiwan Strait (a.k.a. Formosa Strait)	Between Taiwan and Mainland China	150	130,000	180,000	-
Tanon Strait	Between Negros and Cebu islands in the Philippines	500	5,000	27,000	-
Strait of Tartary	Separates the island of Sakhalin from mainland Asia	>4	7,000	23,000	-
Ticao Pass	Separates Ticao Island from the Bicol Peninsula in the Philippines	-	-	-	-
Strait of Tiran	Between the Sinai peninsula and Saudi Arabia. Connect the Gulf of Aqaba and the Red Sea	290	-	13,000	-
Tolo Channel	Narrow opening to the Tolo Harbour in Hong Kong	-	-	-	-
Tongass Passage	Between Alaska and British Columbia	-	-	-	-
Torres Strait	Between New Guinea and Australia	15	150,000	-	-
Tsugaru Strait	Between Hokkaidō and Honshū	200	19,500	-	Seikan Tunnel
Viscount Melville Sound	Between Victoria Island and Prince of Wales Island and the Queen Elizabeth Islands	-	-	-	-
Vitiaz Strait	Between New Britain and the Huon Peninsula, northern New Guinea	-	-	-	-
Wetar Strait	Between East Timor and the Indonesian island of Wetar	-	-	42,600	-
Windward Passage	Between Cuba and Hispaniola	1,700	-	80,000	-
Yucatán Channel	Between Mexico and Cuba. Connects the Yucatán Basin of the Caribbean Sea with the Gulf of Mexico	2,800	-	217,000	-

== See also ==
- Intercontinental and transoceanic fixed links
- Floating suspension bridge
