= Sagewin =

Island in Southwest Papua, Indonesia

- Location in Raja Ampat Islands Location in Southwest Papua

Geography
- Location: Pitt Strait
- Coordinates: 0°56′40.2″S 130°38′57.48″E
- Archipelago: Raja Ampat Islands

Administration
- Indonesia
- Province: Southwest Papua
- Regency: Raja Ampat
- District: West Salawati

Sagewin, or Sagawin, is a small uninhabited island in the Raja Ampat Archipelago of eastern Indonesia. It lies off the north-western tip of the larger island of Salawati and is surrounded by the waters of the Pitt Strait (also known as Sagewin Strait), which separates Salawati from the island of Batanta. The island of Sagewin is 7.3 kilometres in length, and has a mean elevation of 20 meters.

Location of Sagewin between Salawati to the south-east and Batanta to the north.

The area of the Dampier Strait and Pitt Strait are a Marine Protected Area for cetaceans.

== History ==
It had previously been settled by a group of people from the northern part of Salawati, who had split off from the rest of the community after a serious marriage feud. They later moved back to Salawati, to the village of Kaliam, and the island of Sagewin is now uninhabited.

According to local oral traditions of the people living on Batanta, Sagewin was formed when an earthquake broke the tip of a mountain called Kalyakut on that island, and it landed in the sea. This is used to explain why the fauna of Sagewin is more similar to Batanta than to Salawati (for example, leeches and species of cassowary, tree-kangaroos, and crowned pigeon are all found on Salawati, but are absent from both Sagewin and Batanta).

== Citations and references ==
Citations

References

- Hoyt, Erich (2013). Marine Protected Areas for Whales, Dolphins and Porpoises: A World Handbook for Cetacean Habitat Conservation and Planning. Routledge. ISBN 978-1844077625.
- Leeden, A.C. van der (1980). "Report on anthropological field research at the northern Raja Ampat Islands, March–June 1979". In Masinambow, E. K. M. (ed.). Halmahera dan Raja Ampat : konsep dan strategi penelitian. Jakarta: Lembaga Ekonomi dan Kemasyarakatan Nasional, LIPI.
