= Dampier Strait =

Dampier Strait may refer to either of two different straits with the same name which are located near the same island of New Guinea:

- Dampier Strait (Papua New Guinea)
- Dampier Strait (Indonesia)
