= Alexander Dalrymple =

Scottish geographer and hydrographer (1737–1808)

Alexander Dalrymple FRS
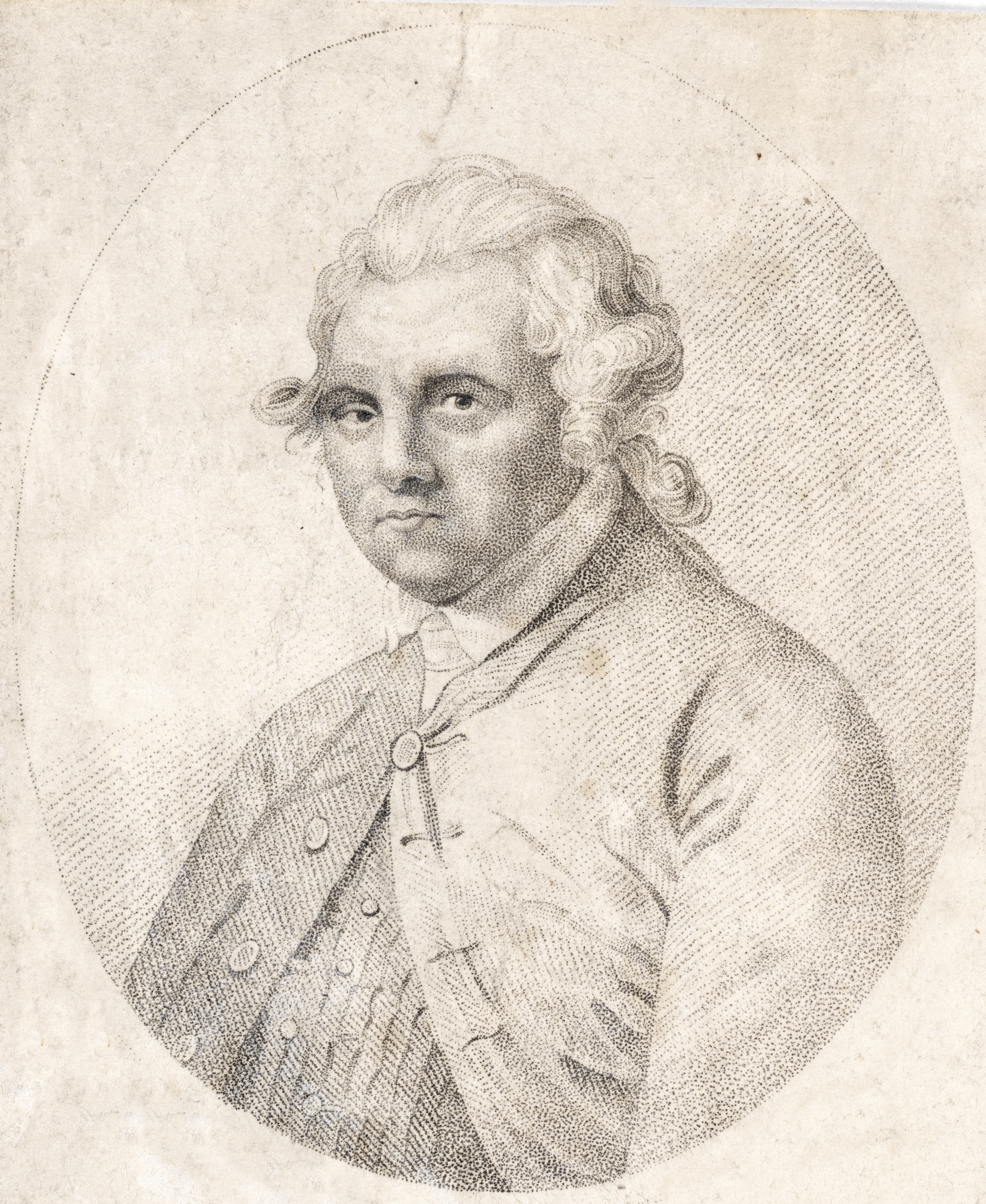
- Alexander Dalrymple Esq., drawing by John Brown, engraving By T. Blood
- Born: 24 July 1737; Newhailes, East Lothian, Scotland
- Died: 19 June 1808 (aged 70)
- Occupation: Hydrographer
- Title: Hydrographer of the Navy
- Awards: Fellow of the Royal Society

Alexander Dalrymple FRS (24 July 1737 – 19 June 1808) was a Scottish geographer, hydrographer, and publisher. He spent the greater part of his career with the British East India Company, starting as a writer in Madras at the age of 16. He studied the old records of the company, and soon became sufficiently knowledgeable to advise on shipping routes in the East Indies. He spent several years travelling, investigating possibilities of expanding the company's trade, and carried out extensive surveys around Borneo, the Philippines, and Indo-China. Returning to England, he published a range of works including charts, histories of past voyages, and proposals for exploration. He was one of the main proponents of the theory that there existed a great undiscovered continent in the South Pacific, Terra Australis Incognita. He was The Royal Society's first choice as leader of the exploration to observe the transit of Venus in 1769, a position taken by James Cook as the Navy would not accept a non-naval man in command. A large part of Cook's first two voyages was in search of the conjectured southern land, leading to the conclusion that, if it did exist, it was further south than the 65° line of latitude. He became Hydrographer to the East India Company, and then the first Hydrographer of the British Admiralty. He produced large numbers of nautical charts and sailing directions many of which remained in print long after his death, contributing significantly to the safety of shipping.

== Early life and career 1737–1758 ==
Dalrymple was born at Newhailes, near Edinburgh, the eleventh of fifteen children of Sir James Dalrymple and his wife, Lady Christian Hamilton, the daughter of the Earl of Haddington. His father served as the Principal Auditor of the Exchequer in Scotland from 1721 until his death, and was the Member of Parliament for Haddington Burghs from 1722 to 1734. Alexander attended David Young's School in Haddington. The Dalrymples were opposed to the Stuart dynasty, and the family moved to Berwick-on-Tweed for safety during the 1745-6 Jacobite uprising, after which Alexander returned to school until he was fourteen. His father died in 1751, and with the help of his uncle General St. Clair, who knew the chairman of the British East India Company, an appointment was arranged for Alexander as a writer in the company. He travelled to London in 1752, then sailed to Madras in the Suffolk East-Indiaman, commanded by Captain William Wilson, who befriended the young man on the voyage. He arrived in Madras, aged 16, in 1753.

Dalrymple's uncle had recommended him to Lord Pigot, who became Governor of Madras in 1755. He also became acquainted with the historian Robert Orme who allowed him access to his library. Dalrymple took the opportunity to study the old records of the company, and soon became knowledgeable about previous voyages in the East Indies. This proved its worth in 1758 when Captain Wilson arrived back in Madras in command of the Pitt East-Indiaman. Wilson was intending to continue to Canton, in China, but had been delayed, and it was too late in the season to sail by the standard route through the South China Sea as the contrary north-east Monsoon would start in October. The normal procedure would have been to wait several months for the return of the south-west monsoon, but Wilson was thinking of a different route, heading south-east to Batavia, now Jakarta, then east and north-east to the north-west coast of New Guinea, then north-west to Canton, with the monsoon winds on his beam. This route was longer, and parts of it were not well known to British sailors, but the winds were favourable. Wilson discussed this with Dalrymple, who was able to confirm its practicality on the basis of voyages in the previous century. Wilson took this route, and successfully completed his voyage six months earlier than expected. Off the north-west coast of New Guinea, Wilson passed through a channel he named the Pitt Strait.

The voyage was important for the company, as the route became a standard alternative that opened up China navigation at any time of year.

== Voyages 1758–1765 ==
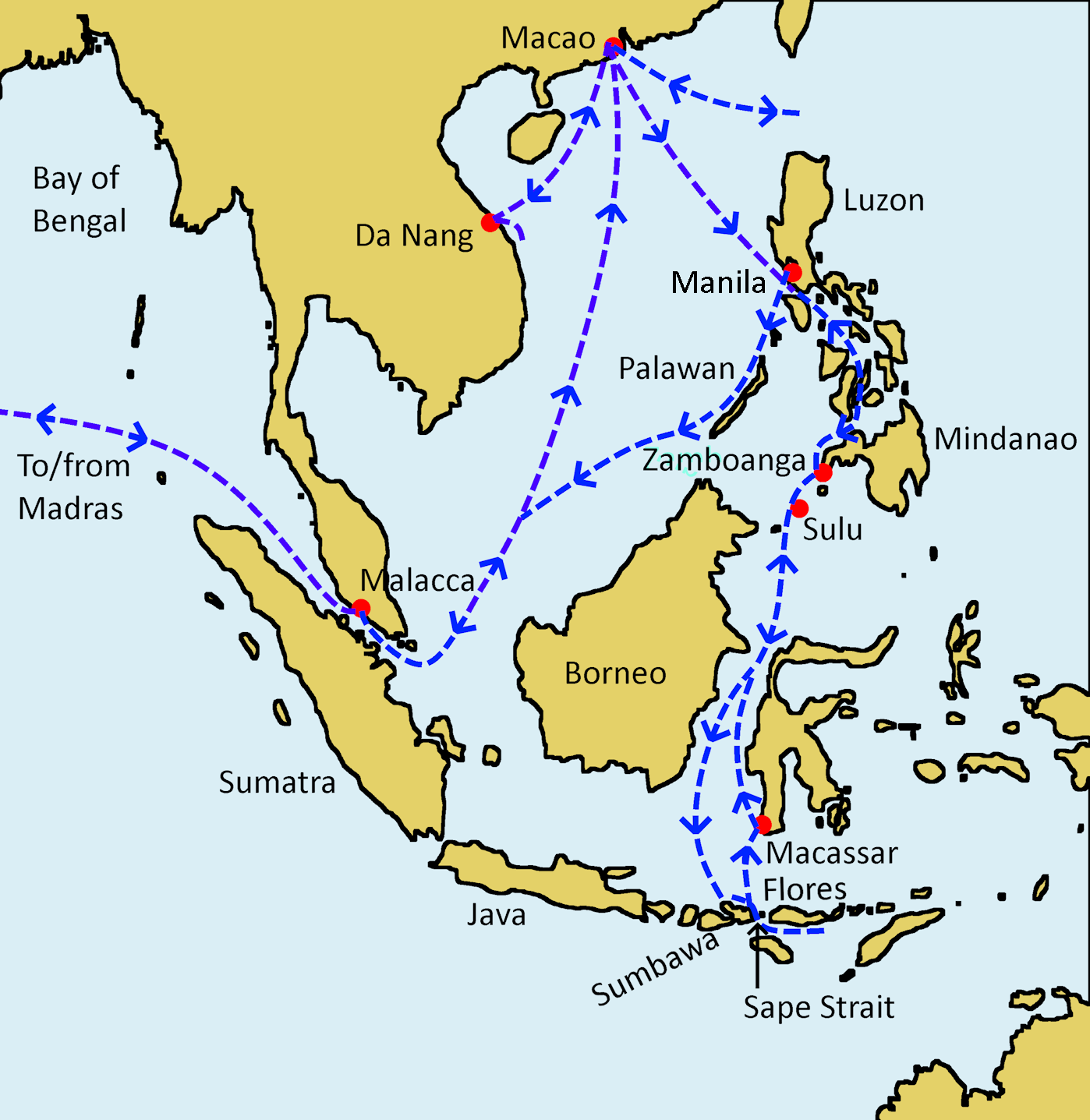
Route of the Cuddalore 1759-1762

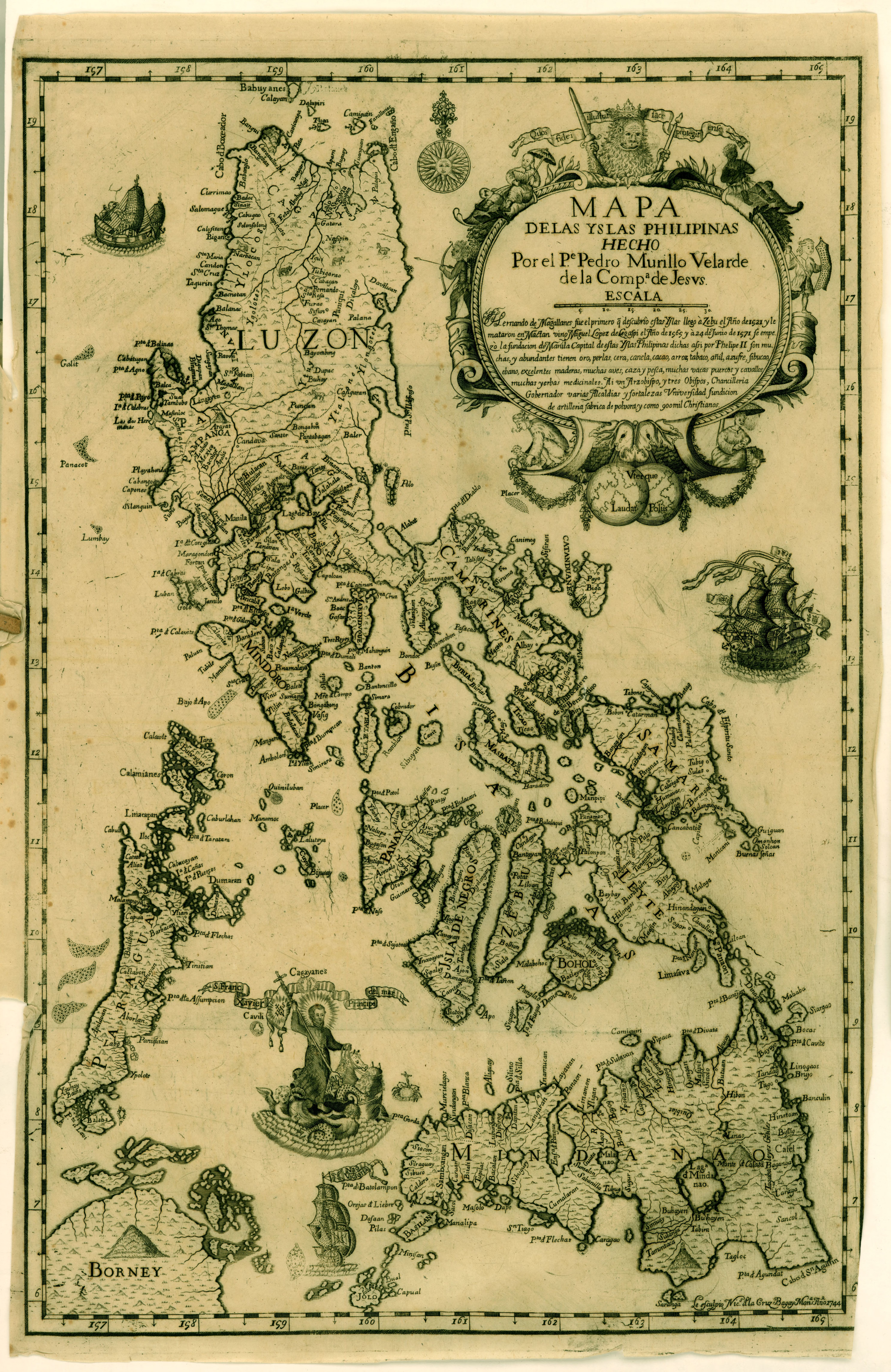
1749 map of the Philippines, from one of the books purchased from the effects of William Roberts. The Sulu Sea and Archipelago are at lower left.

While in Madras, Dalrymple had become interested in new possibilities of trade in the East Indies. He realised that Wilson's route took him close to the Sulu Sea, where there were numerous islands that were not controlled by rival Dutch or Spanish interests, and that could form a good trading base for the company. Dalrymple proposed a voyage of discovery to the Sulu Archipelago to Lord Pigot, the governor, and also expressed his wish to lead it in person. Pigot tried to dissuade him from this, as his absence on a long voyage would likely impair his promotion prospects, but Dalrymple was determined, and Pigot agreed.

Preparations were delayed by the Siege of Madras (December 1758 – February 1759) by French forces, part of the Seven Years' War. Madras was subjected to heavy bombardment, but was able to hold out until reinforcements arrived. One of the casualties of the bombardment was a supercargo called William Roberts. After his death his assets were sold, and Dalrymple was able to buy some Spanish books on the history and geography of the Philippines, which were very useful in planning his expedition.

=== Cuddalore voyage ===
The vessel chosen for the voyage was the snow Cuddalore, which sailed to Malacca under the command of George Baker, while Dalrymple travelled as a passenger on the Winchelsea with Thomas Howe, an experienced captain who took the opportunity to teach Dalrymple navigation and seamanship. In Malacca, Dalrymple transferred to Cuddalore, initially under the joint command of Baker and himself. They sailed to Macao, and had to wait for supplies to arrive from Europe. Dalrymple decided to explore and survey the islands to the north of the Philippines which were on the Wilson route to China. They left Macao on 27 July 1759, returning on 13 October. Baker resigned his command on 24 November, leaving Dalrymple in sole command.

There were then difficulties with the authorities in Macao over the return of some seamen who had deserted earlier, leading to a delay of several months. The Cuddalore then made a brief visit to Touranne (Da Nang) and Cape Padarin in Cochin China, now Vietnam. This took him to regions little visited by the British, including the coast of Hainan, and Dalrymple sent his observations directly to William Pitt, Secretary of State, thinking they might be useful in case of hostilities with the Chinese. While relations with China at this stage were difficult, the active hostilities were with France, whose forces had taken much of Sumatra and were blockading the Sunda Strait, the normal route for East-Indiamen sailing from China to England. Dalrymple was asked by the Committee of Supercargoes in Canton to assist a convoy of five ships on an alternative route by way of the Sulu Sea, the Makassar Strait, and then through the Sape Strait into the Indian Ocean, after which sailing to England was straightforward. Much of this route was uncharted, and the Cuddalore could act as scout for the larger vessels. Dalrymple readiy agreed, as the route would take them to the Sulu archipelago, the main target of his plans.

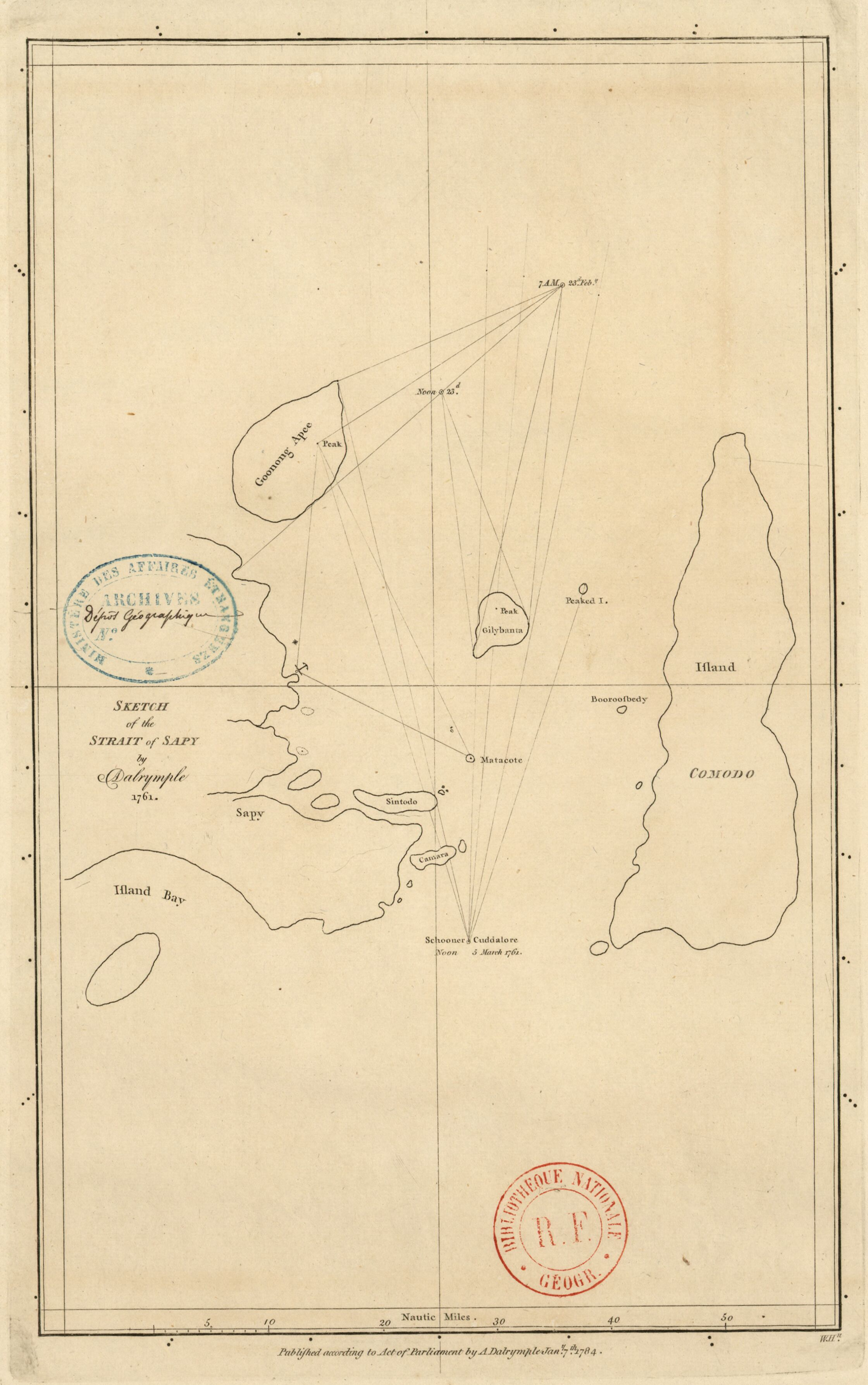
Dalrymple's sketch chart of the strait of Sape, surveyed in 1761

The convoy left on 30 December 1760, and after a stormy trip in which one ship went aground and was abandoned, arrived in Sulu late in January 1761. Here Dalrymple negotiated a provisional trading agreement with the sultan of Sulu. The convoy left Sulu after five days, and travelled through the Makassar Strait to Sumbawa. They then continued south into the Indan Ocean. Dalrymple wrote that they were "the first English ships that ever passed the Strait of Sapy (Sape), so far as I know". Dalrymple then undertook a survey of Sumbawa, the Sape Strait, and the south coast of Flores. He then returned to Sulu, where the trading agreement was ratified by the datus, the Sulu nobility.

In 1762 he took the opportunity to determine the Longitude of Sulu using the satellites of Jupiter. James Rennell, who accompanied Dalrymple on the voyage, recorded in his journal that Dalrymple had two good telescopes and a time-keeper for this purpose, as well as a quadrant for determining the latitudes.

Dalrymple then sailed north to Samboangan (Zamboanga) in the Philippines, where he met the governor of the Spanish fortress Don Manuel Galves, who he described as "an intelligent man, and the best artist I have known among the Spanish navigators". The governor, an experienced hydrographer, shared much information with Dalrymple, and gave him a letter of introduction to his brother in Manila, where Dalrymple next headed. However he was received there with some suspicion, perhaps because the authorities there were more aware of the possibility of a war with Britain. The Cuddalore now made passage back to India, surveying the west coast of Palawan and the Anamba and Natuna Islands on the return journey, arriving back in Madras on 28 January 1762.

=== London Voyage ===
Dalrymple followed this up with a voyage in the packet London. Arriving in Sulu in August 1762, he found chaotic conditions due to famine, disease, and the death of the local leader most responsible for the contract. There were also delays in the arrival of trading goods, and a violent incident that led to the death of two crew members. Dalrymple had been considering several possibilities for a trading location, and now turned his attention to Balambangan, an Island off the north-east coast of Borneo, which was also within the Sulu sphere of influence. Towards the end of the Seven Years' War British forces had captured Manila from the Spanish in a short siege. Dalrymple went there to investigate trade possibilities, and was able to arrange the release of the elderly Sultan of Sulu, Alimuddin I, who had been imprisoned by the Spanish. In gratitude the Sultan ceded Balambangan to the company. Dalrymple remained some while in Manila, and was elected Provisional Deputy Governor by the Manila Council with the resignation of Dawsonne Drake on 29 March 1764. His main task was overseeing the evacuation of Manila, which was being returned to Spain under the terms of the Treaty of Paris. This completed, he left Manila on 10 April for Sulu with the Sultan. Dalrymple then sailed to China, arriving in Canton November 1764, and then back to London, arriving in July 1765.

== London and Madras 1765–1779 ==
On his return to London, Dalrymple found that there had been a change in Company personnel, and the new administration was much less enthusuastic about his plans for expanding the company's trade. He continued his work on historical voyages with a view to informing future projects of exploration and discovery. He had obtained some histories taken from the Spanish during the British occupation of Manila in 1762, and was also seeking out relevant material in the London bookshops. An important find was a collection of documents from the Spanish archives which had once belonged to the French statesman Jean-Baptiste Colbert. This included an account of the voyage of Luís Vaz de Torres from Espíritu Santo to Manila in 1605-1606 through the strait between New Guinea and Australia, now known as the Torres Strait. Knowledge of this discovery had been lost, and this account was an important part of the material Dalrymple assembled.

=== Establishment at Balambangan ===
In 1768, with the Company facing financial pressures, the idea of an establishment at Balambangan was again considered, and Dalrymple was asked to prepare an outline plan, which he did. The company decided to go ahead with the scheme, with Dalrymple as leader. However disagreements soon arose. Dalrymple, aware that initially at least the settlement would be vulnerable to both native and European rivalries, wanted full control of the operation, and in particular opposed the establishment of a Council. He also required remuneration adequate to compensate for the labour involved and the risks, considering that the chief should not have to engage in private trade to obtain his reward. The ensuing discussions and then conflict, as well as wider political concerns, caused considerabl delay, and eventually there was a complete rupture between Dalrymple and the Directors. He was dismissed from the company's service on 21 March 1771.

The Company then appointed John Herbert as chief of the settlement. Herbert has been described as "one of the most avaricious yet inefficient villains ever to be employed by the Company".. His journey from Bombay to Balambangan took nearly two years, as he took opportunities to trade with the natives along the route for his own profit. He finally arrived in December 1773. No accounting was made of the cargoes supplied by the company, nor were any funds remitted, although great expenses were charged to the company. On the 26 January 1775, a Sulu force led by a cousin of the Sultan, who had been pressed for repayment of debt and insulted by Herbert, attacked and overwhelmed the compound. Those who could, including Herbert, fled to the ships. Others were massacred, and the settlement was plundered and burned.

=== Advocacy of the Great Southern Continent ===
Dalrymple's An Account of the Discoveries Made in the South Pacifick Ocean, Previous to 1764. was published in 1769, but printed in 1767 and privately circulated. The work included a description of discoveries in the South Pacific, as its title suggests, and also clarified some uncertainties in identification of localities in the early accounts. But equally important was his advocacy of the idea of a southern continent. The idea that there needed to be a great land mass south of the equator to balance the known lands to the north has a history dating back to classical antiquity. It was often referred to as Terra Australis, the southern land. Dalrymple sums it up thus:

It has been commonly alledged, and perhaps not without good reason, from a consideration of the weight of land to water, that a Continent is wanting on the South of the Equator, to counterpoize the land on the North, and to maintain the equilibrium necessary for the earth's motion.

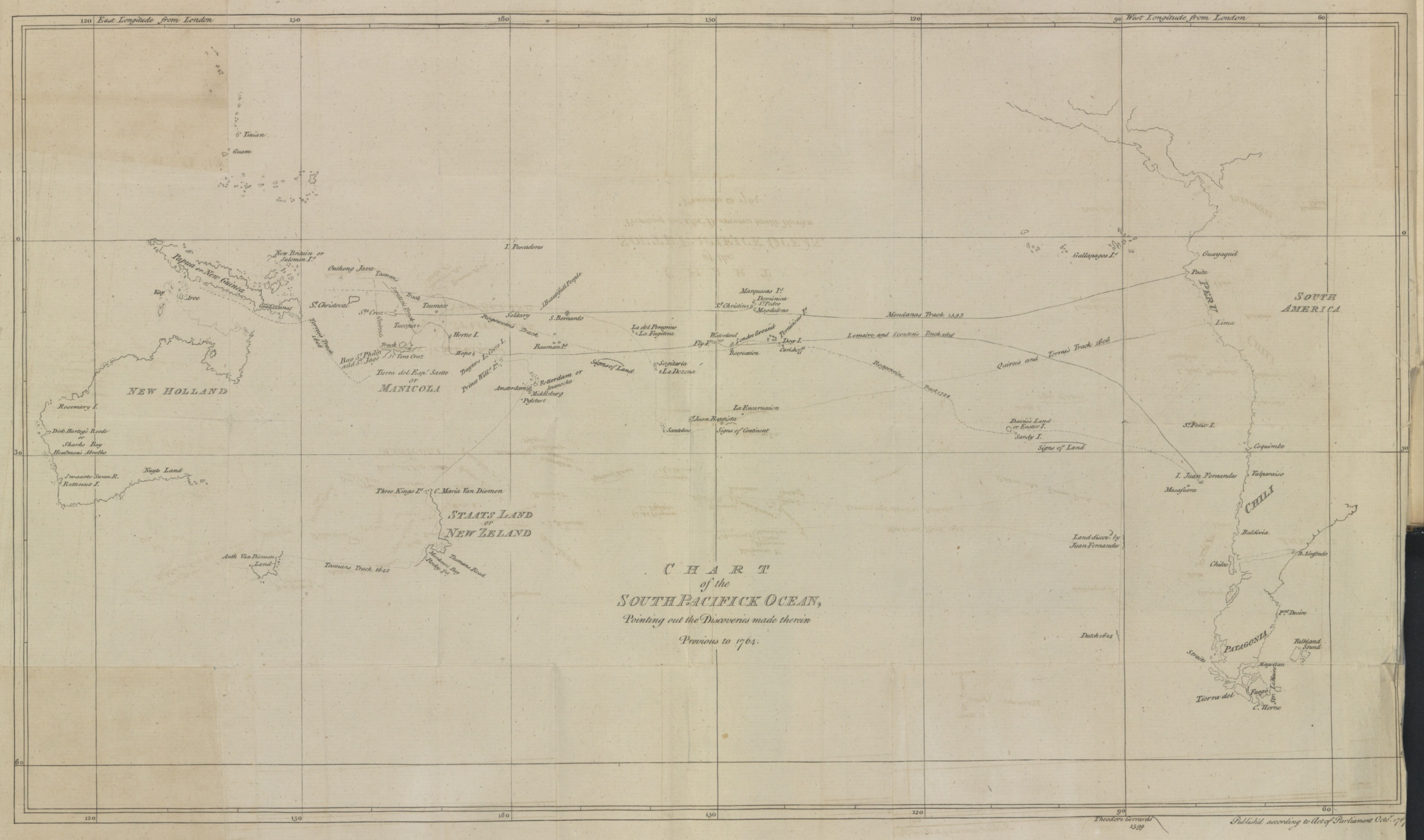
Dalrymple's chart of the South Pacific showing discoveries made before 1764

The arguments he presented include reported sightings of the continent, areas known from previous exploration to be open water, and observations of wind, on the assumption that in open ocean winds will be constant, while variable winds would indicate the presence of a land mass. Taking these together he suggested that the continental mass would be found in the south Pacific, as southern regions of the Atlantic were much better explored. He included a chart showing his summary of discoveries to support this. He speculated that the continent could have a population of over 50 million, and provide great trading opportunities if claimed for Great Britain. Ideas such as these were influential, and widely disseminated and discussed in popular outlets such as The Gentleman's Magazine as well as in specialist journals.

=== Transit of Venus and search for the continent ===
In 1769 a Transit of Venus was due to occur, providing an opportunity to make observations to determine the astronomical unit, the distance between the earth and the sun. This required observations to be made from locations distant from one another, and by 1766 the Royal Society was making plans for an expedition to the south Pacific for this purpose. Dalrymple was already proposing himself as a candidate to lead a new voyage of exploration to the Pacific, writing to Lord Shelburne, Secretary of State for the Southern Department, with the support of Adam Smith, who he had met through his older brother Lord Hailes. Dalrymple attended several meetings of the Royal Society Council, and Dalrymple was named as the Society's choice to lead the expedition. Plans were approved by the Crown in 1768, with the Royal Navy to provide a ship and crew. It soon became apparent that the Navy was not willing to accept a non-naval man in command of a Navy ship, and Dalrymple was not willing to go unless he was leader of the expedition. James Cook was then selected as the leader, being both a naval officer with great experience in surveying, and a man with respectable scientific credentials. The expedition left for Tahiti on 26 August 1768, with HMS Endeavour under Cook's command, Charles Green as astronomer and Joseph Banks as naturalist. Dalrymple gave a copy of his book and chart to Banks to take on the voyage.

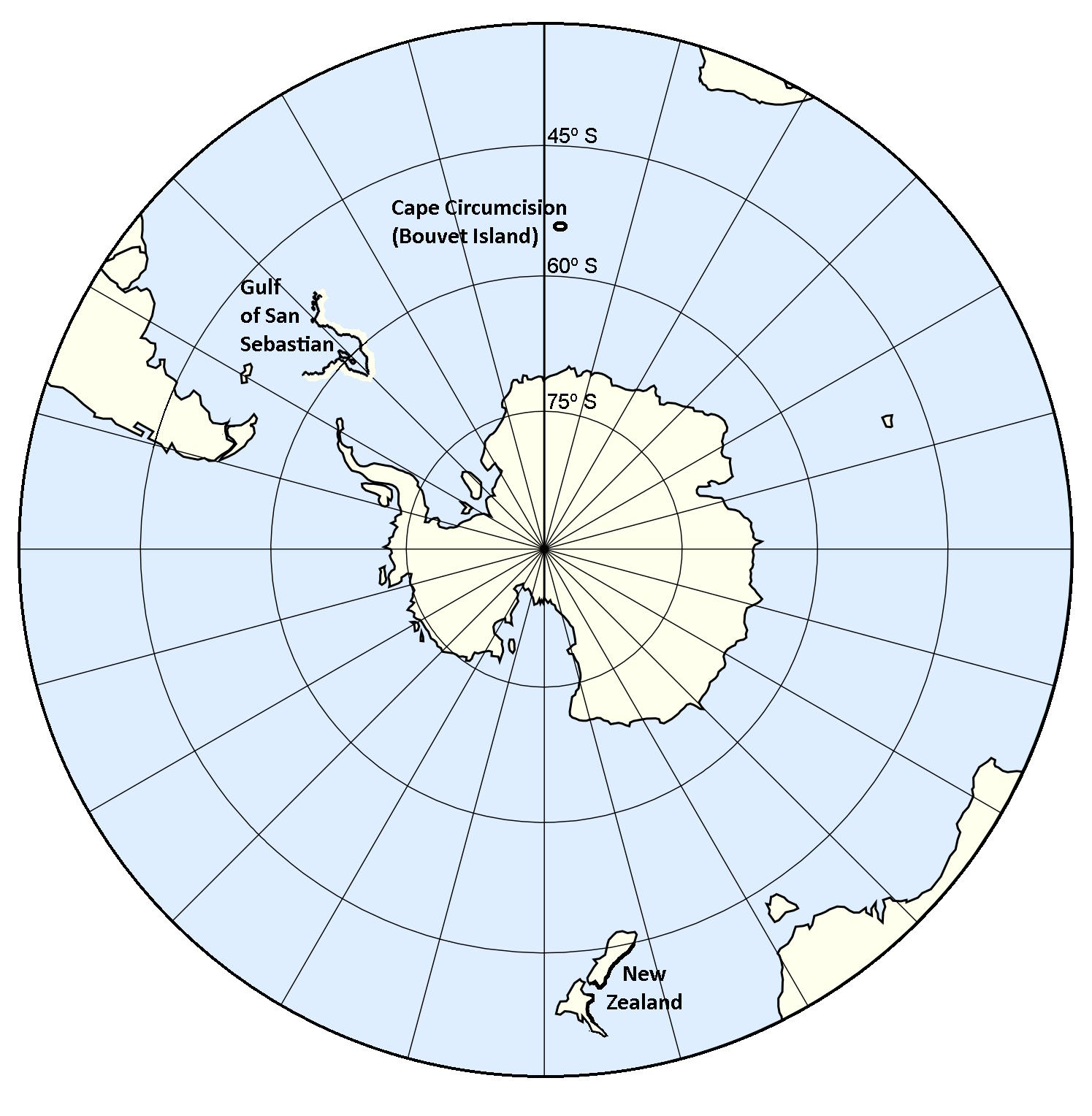
Map showing claimed locations of parts of the Great Southern Continent, compared to the outline of modern Antarctica

While Dalrymple did not succeed in his bid to lead the Pacific expedition, the ideas he proposed in the Account had the desired effect. Cook was given secret orders to be opened after the completion of the astronomical work in Tahiti. These required him to search for the Southern continent, proceeding south and then west until he reached New Zealand. This he did, and found no southern continent. It took a second voyage in which Cook circumnavigated the globe between 60 and 65°S to establish that no such great continent existed. The much smaller southern continent of Antarctica was discovered, slowly, in the 19th-century. The continent is almost entirely south of the Antarctic Circle, and had no population until recently. It was definitely not what Dalrymple had in mind - he envisaged a continent "equal in extent to all the civilized part of Asia, from Turkey to the eastern extremity of China". Dalrymple did not publish a chart showing the projected outline of the entire southern continent, unlike some other writers such as Philippe Buache. But he did indicate three supposed sightings of the continent at identifiable locations - the Gulf of San Sebastian, the west coast of New Zealand, and Cape Circumcision. The Gulf was shown by Cook not to exist, and the other two to not be part of a continent.

=== Chart publishing ===
Between 1769 and 1775 Dalrymple's main activity was chart publishing. He started with a chart of the South Atlantic Ocean, and then with six charts from his own surveys in the East Indies. A memoir was published with each chart which gave additional information and sailing directions. In 1769 and 1771 he published the two volumes of An Historical Collection of the Several Voyages and Discoveries in the South Pacific Ocean. This collection of descriptions and translations of accounts of Spanish and Dutch voyages in effect replaces Part 2 of the Account, which was never published in that form, providing the detailed evidence on which the summaries in Part 1 are based. In 1775 he published A Collection of Plans of Ports, &c. in the East Indies. This was much more ambitious, containing plans of harbours and anchorages from South Africa to the Philippines. There were 83 in all, some newly published, others reprinted.

Dalrymple was elected a Fellow of the Royal Society on 14 February 1771. His proposers included Benjamin Franklin, and the nomination described him as "a gentleman well versed in mathematical and geographical knowledge and translator of voyages to the South Seas and other places from Spanish".

=== Hawkesworth's Account of the Voyages ===
In 1773, the account of Cook's first voyage (1768 to 1771) was published together with the voyages of John Byron, Samuel Wallis and Philip Carteret. Lord Sandwich, the First Lord of the Admiralty wanted these accounts published, but thought that the journals as they stood would not appeal to the general public. He looked for a popular writer to take this on, and John Hawkesworth was chosen, and given great freedom to edit the accounts as he saw fit. The resulting publication, An Account of the Voyages..., sold well, but was heavily criticised on several grounds, including errors and inaccuracies, Hawkesworth's lack of understanding of nautical matters, and his conflating of the source journals into a single first-person narrative, so that, for example, it was not possible to tell what came from Cook's account and what from that of Banks, or for that matter what were Hawkesworth's own interpolations.

Dalrymple took great exception to Voyages. He considered that Hawkesworth had unjustly accused him of misrepresenting earlier Spanish and Dutch voyages to support his own theories concerning the Southern Continent, and had not given credit for his (Dalrymple's) contributions in stimulating the exploration of the south Pacific, and in providing useful information to the Royal Society expedition, for example on the existence of a strait between Australia and New Guinea (the Torres Strait) which Cook used on his return journey. These views were expressed in a Letter to Dr Hawkesworth published soon after Voyages appeared. Dalrymple was not a tactful man, and the violence of his response has been remarked on by both contemporary and modern writers. A review in 1774 refers to "the ill-humour which breathes throughout a considerable part of the letter". Fry (1970) considers that Hawkesworth was both unjust and ungenerous, but that "in his anger Dalrymple certainly went too far", and suggests that Hawkesworth responded to Dalrymple in the preface to the second edition of Voyages with a "lofty and patronizing air" because of Dalrymple's lack of tact.

=== Madras 1775–1777 ===
In 1775 Dalrymple was appointed a member of the Madras Council, Pigot having been appointed Governor for a second term. He sailed with Pigot to Madras in April of that year. There was a major dispute within the Council concerning Tanjore. The majority opposed Pigot, and had him arrested. Dalrymple returned overland to England to present Pigot's case, arriving back in April 1777. Pigot died that year, while still under house arrest.

On the outward voyage to Madras in Grenville, Dalrymple had the opportunity of using a chronometer for the first time, an Arnold. He kept a detailed log of the voyage including longitude measured both by the chronometer and by dead reckoning. He emphasised the importance of measuring position by both methods, as the difference between the two gave an estimate of the effects of current. He published the journal of the voyage in Philosophical Transactions. He became an advocate of the use of chronometers for navigation, and suggested a voyage to determine the accurate locations of "all the remarkable Head-Lands of the World". It would not be until the Atlantic voyage of Henry Foster 1828-1831 that the first steps would be taken to implement this idea systematically.

== Hydrographer 1779–1808 ==
In 1779, Dalrymple was appointed Hydrographer to the East India Company. He was responsible for preparing and printing charts for the use of the company. During the next 15 years he produced 35-40 charts a year.. In about 1790 he produced Practical Navigation, which was not published, but circulated privately. On the subject of winds, he wrote:

My friend, the ingenious Mr Smeaton having formed a Scale of Winds according to the effects on Austhorpe Mill; I thought it would be very desirable to make a comparison between the Scales, formed by him form the effects on wind-mills and inferred by me from the effects on vessels at sea. (pp 38-39)

Smeaton's scale was included in the paper for which he was awarded the Copley Medal. In Defining the Wind: The Beaufort Scale and How a 19th-Century Admiral Turned Science into Poetry, author Scott Huler relates that Dalrymple's voyages had convinced him that a standard scale for measuring the speed of wind at sea would be of great value to sailors, and refers to Practical Navigation. It is believed that Dalrymple conveyed this information to Francis Beaufort, who became Hydrographer of the Navy in 1829, and who refined the wind scale that bears his name and that is still in use today.

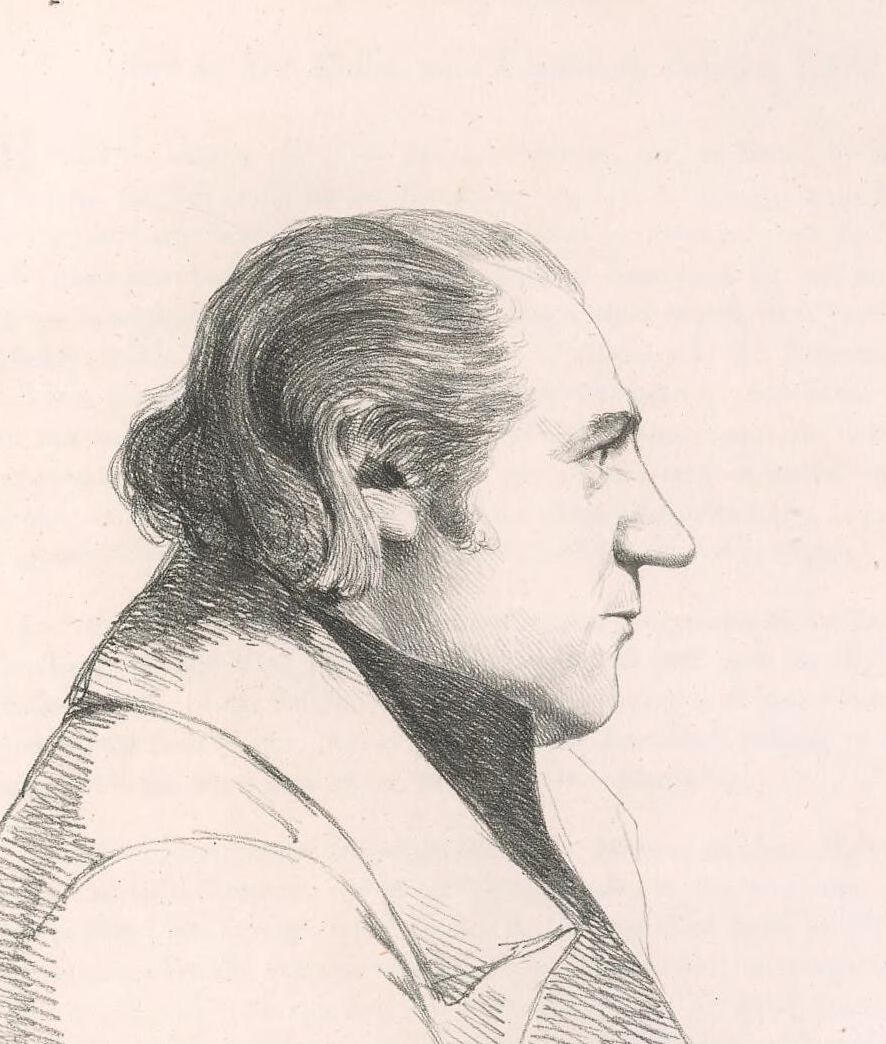
Alexander Dalrymple engraved by William Daniell from a 1794 drawing by George Dance

France had had a Naval Hydrographic Office, the Dépôt des cartes et plans de la Marine since 1720. Suggestions for a similar establishment in Great Britain had been made on several occasion in the 18th-century. In 1769 Lord Howe informed Dalrymple that he had urged the establishment of such an office, naming Dalrymple as a suitable candidate for hydrographer. But nothing was done. Naval officers were carrying out surveys at this period, and they deposited their results with the Admiralty, but the surveyors had the charts printed and published on their own account, and there was no system for managing the information. Eventually, in 1795, an Order in Council was issued, establishing the Hydrographic Office of the Admiralty, and Dalrymple was appointed as the first Hydrographer of the Navy, continuing with his role in the East India Company. By 1797 the Admiralty staff in addition to Dalrymple consisted of an assistant, a draughtsman, three copper-plate engravers, and a printer.

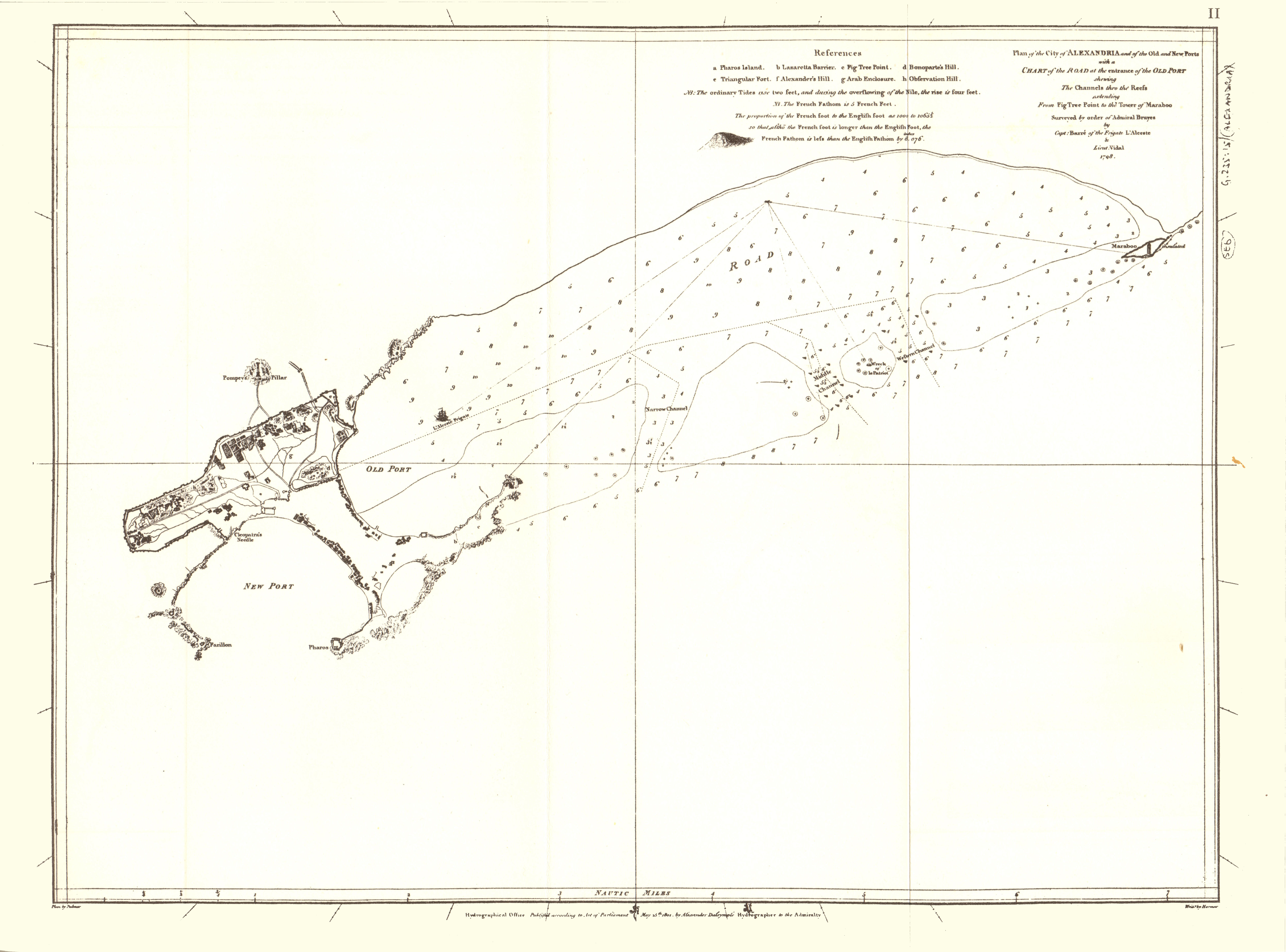
An early Admiralty Chart of the City of Alexandria, published in 1801. Plate II in Day (1967). Dalrymple simplified his charts by removing the rhumb lines used by other publishers, and marking the ends outside the chart border, so the lines could eaily be drawn if needed. These outer rays are distinctive features of later Dalrymple charts.

Dalrymple and his staff had first to evaluate the material that the Admiralty had accumulated over the previous century. This took time, and the first Admiralty chart was not published until 1800. Progress continued to be slow, as the new charts often needed to be compiled from several surveys and from existing charts at different scales, rather than being facsimile reproductions. Dalrymple was also in poor health be this time. In 1807, the Admiralty Board ordered the purchase of all available charts published in England, over 1,000 in all, so that a selection could be made of those that should be issued to the fleet. Dalrymple being unfamiliar with many of the areas covered suggested the formation of a committee to advise on the selection. This was agreed to, and Captains E.N. Columbine, Thomas Hurd, and Sir Home Popham were appointed.

There were a number of conflicts between the committee and Dalrymple. One concerned the issue of unpublished surveys. Dalrymple's view was that the committee should only be concerned with the selection of published material for re-issue, and that the selection and preparation of unpublished data was the responsibility of his office. Dalrymple was over-ruled. More important was the question of material from the French explorer d'Entrecasteaux. The data from his Pacific surveys had been captured by the Royal Navy in 1796. Dalrymple had had the material copied and the originals returned to France. He refused to use the material until it had been published by the French, regarding such scientific material as being held in trust, and immune from the vicissitudes of war. The committee again disagreed, requiring access to the data not for full publication, but for correction of Admiralty charts. When Dalrymple again refused access his resignation was demanded, which was effected on 28 May 1808. The stated reason was that because of Dalrymple's failing health he was not able to fully carry out his duties. John Barrow, who knew Dalrymple both through the Royal Society, and as Secretary to the Admiralty from 1804, agreed that Dalrymple "exhibited so many symptoms of decayed faculties [...] as to lessen the value of those services for which he had previously been so highly respected". He died three weeks later. He was succeeded as Hydrographer by Thomas Hurd, one of the committee.

== Legacy ==
Some writers have drawn attention to the failures and disappointments of Dalrymple's career: his efforts to boost the trade of the East India Company had no lasting effect, his ambition to be the explorer of the South Pacific was frustrated, the Great Southern Continent that he argued for tirelessly turned out not to exist, and his tenure as first Hydrographer of the Admiralty ended in conflict and humiliation. Andrew Cook has summarised some of these views..

Even a conspicuous failure such as his advocacy of the southern continent had important positive consequences. Dalrymple was the main British proponent of this idea, and his publications were informed by a detailed knowledge of historical voyages from the manuscripts he had acquired and consulted. While the arguments for it may seem overstated to modern readers, they were widely publicised and discussed, in popular as well as in specialist publications. Howard Fry cites Isaiah Berlin on this style of polemic:

No great doctrine of originality or power in human affairs appears to me ever to have got into the common consciouness of men unless it was to some degree over-stated.

Dalrymple's standing was high enough for him to be the Royal Society's first choice to lead the Venus transit expedition, which was also to continue with exploration of the south Pacific. The Admiralty insisted on a Naval officer to be in command, resulting in the appointment of James Cook. While Dalrymple refused to take part in a subordinate role, his ideas remained influential, and to a large extent set the agenda for James Cook's Pacific voyages which, while not finding the Southern Continent, covered enormous hitherto unexplored areas of the southern oceans.

The other major and lasting influence of Dalrymple was as a publisher. As Andrew Cook stated in 1993:

No biographer has effectively examined the core which ran through Dalrymple's life, his sense of responsibility to assemble, codify and publish geographical knowledge

Dalrymple's published output was prolific. Andrew Cook catalogues over 250 letterpress (text) publications, and over 1100 charts plans and views. The text publications include: accounts of his own voyages; collections of historical voyages; memoirs to published charts, including sailing directions; surveying manuals; and correspondence and polemics, including the arguments for the southern continent.

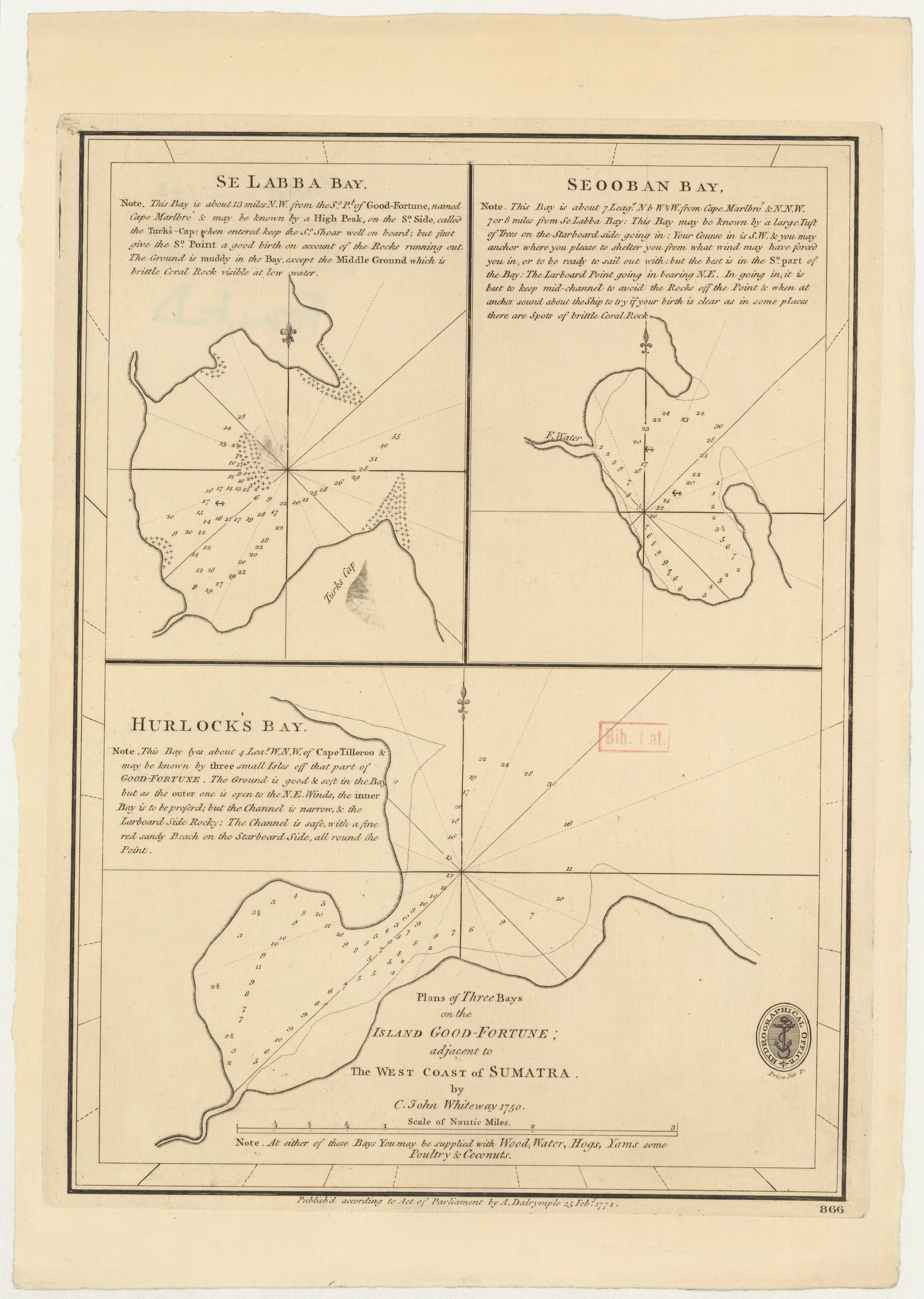
Plans of three bays on the island of Sipora, off Sumatra. First published by Dalrymple in 1744, this chart was re-issued by Hurd as Amiralty chart No 866, and was still listed in the 1895 Admiralty Chart Catalogue.

Dalrymple's publications of charts plans and views include material from his own surveys as well as reproductions of charts from other sources, many of them previously only in manuscript. When Dalrymple was ousted in 1808 and replaced as hydrographer by Hurd, the first priority was getting charts out to the Navy's ships, and many of these were charts published by Dalrymple. After Dalrymple's death, his heirs offered the original copper plates to the Admiralty and the East India Company, but they declined to pay the price suggested, and the plates were sold for their scrap value. Hurd then bought the plates from the scrap metal dealer, a transaction considered by some to be sharp practice. Over the next few years Hurd reissued about 400 of these charts under the Admiralty imprint, assigning them Admiralty chart numbers. Many of them continued on sale for decades. The last chart to be withdrawn was in 1959.

The naval historian Adrian Webb argues that Hurd and his successor Parry developed Dalrymple's legacy into an office which Beaufort was able to take to a position of international pre-eminence.

In 1819, Dalrymple was honoured when a Scottish surgeon and botanist William Roxburgh, published the genus name Dalrympelea for a group of flowering shrubs from Tropical Asia, in Plants of Coromandel.

== See also ==
- Hydrographer of the Navy
- Terra Australis
- East India Company

== Sources ==
- Cook, Andrew Stanley (1993). Alexander Dalrymple (1737-1808), hydrographer to the East India Company and the Admiralty, as publisher: a catalogue of books and charts (PhD thesis). St Andrews University. hdl:10023/2634.

Andrew Cook's magisterial PhD thesis focuses on Dalrymple as publisher. Full text is available from the St Andrew's University repository website:

Volume 1 gives an account of Dalrymple's life and describes the stages of his publishing career.
Volume 2 is a catalogue of his text publications.
Volume 3 is a catalogue of his charts. It is in four parts:

Part 1, 1767-1783
Part 2, 1784-1794
Part 3, 1795-1811
Part 4, List of locations

- Fry, H.T. (1970). Alexander Dalrymple and the Expansion of British Trade. Frank Cass for the Royal Commonwealth Society. ISBN 978-0-802-01717-8.

Howard Fry's monograph uses an episodic approach and focusses on Dalrymple's efforts to expand the trading position of the East India Company, though it also covers his hydrographic work.
