= Madder Cliffs =

Cliffs of Antarctica

Coordinates: 63°18′S 56°29′W

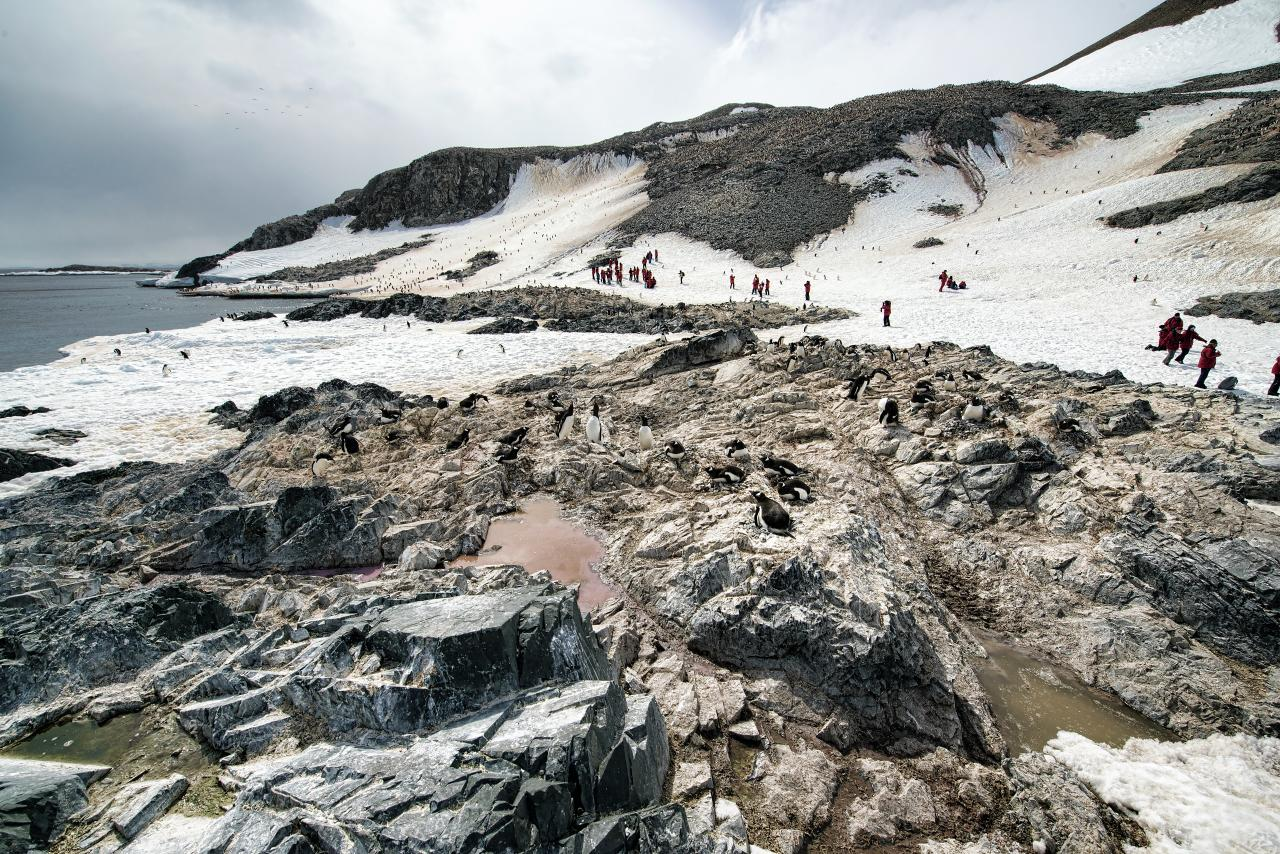
Madder Cliffs, Joinville Island

The Madder Cliffs are reddish rock cliffs which form the north side of the entrance to Suspiros Bay, at the west end of Joinville Island, Antarctica. They rise steeply from the sea to about 305 metres (1,000 ft). The cliffs were surveyed by the Falkland Islands Dependencies Survey in 1953–54. The name, given in 1956 by the UK Antarctic Place-Names Committee, is descriptive of the red colour of the rocks, madder being a red vegetable pigment.

== Important Bird Area ==
A 61 hectares (150 acres) tract of land at the site has been identified as an Important Bird Area (IBA) by BirdLife International because it supports a large breeding colony of about 22,000 pairs of Adélie penguins which nest on exposed knolls and ridges above the beach. Other birds nesting at the site in smaller numbers include gentoo penguins, kelp gulls and snowy sheathbills.

== See also ==
- Skog Passage
