= Pitt Strait (Indonesia) =

Strait in Indonesia

- Selat Sagewin (Indonesian)
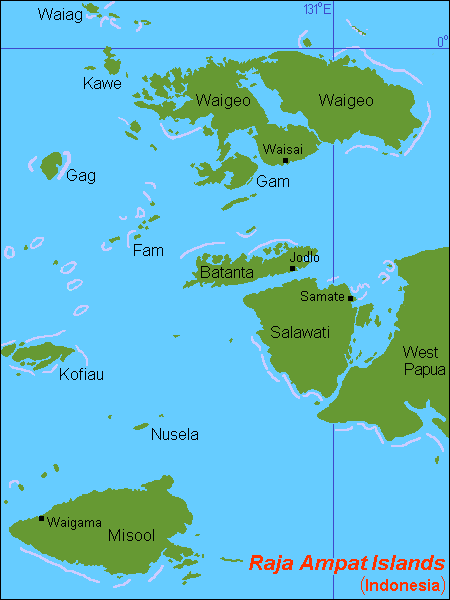

- Location within Western New Guinea
- Coordinates: 00°55′00″S 130°45′00″E
- Type: strait
- Basin countries: Indonesia
- References: Straat Sagewin: Indonesia National Geospatial-Intelligence Agency, Bethesda, MD, USA

Pitt Strait (Indonesia) (a.k.a. Pitt's Strait, Sagewin Strait), falls within the waters of the Indonesian province of Southwest Papua. The strait separates the Raja Ampat islands of Batanta and Salawati and links the Ceram Sea to the Pacific Ocean. To its west lies Dampier Strait, which separates Batanta island from Waigeo island. The Sagewin Strait name refers to Sagewin Island, which lies at the south east side of Pitt Strait, close to Salawati.

== History ==
In 1759 Captain William Wilson sailing in the East Indiaman Pitt navigated these waters and named the channel between Batanta and Salawati Pitt Strait, after his vessel, or equally, her namesake. He also named the two islands King George's Island and Prince of Wales's Island, but these names did not prove as durable as that of the strait.

The area of the Dampier Strait and Pitt Strait are a Marine Protected Area for cetaceans.
