= Cozumel Channel =

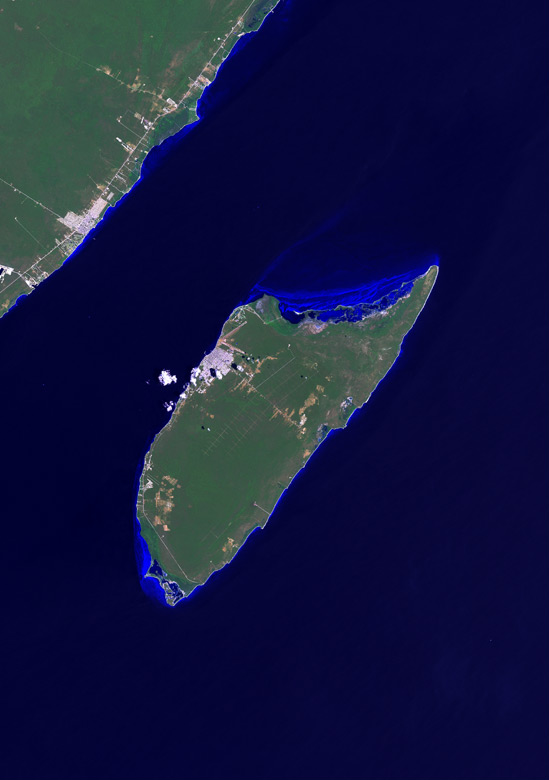
- Map of the region.

- Location within Cozumel Location within the Caribbean
- Coordinates: 20°33′00″N 87°02′00″W
- Basin countries: Mexico

The Cozumel Channel (Spanish: Estrecho de Cozumel) is a strait between Cozumel island and the Yucatán Peninsula, Mexico. It is controlled by Mexico.

== See also ==
- List of straits
