= Bangka Strait =

- Selat Bangka (Indonesian)
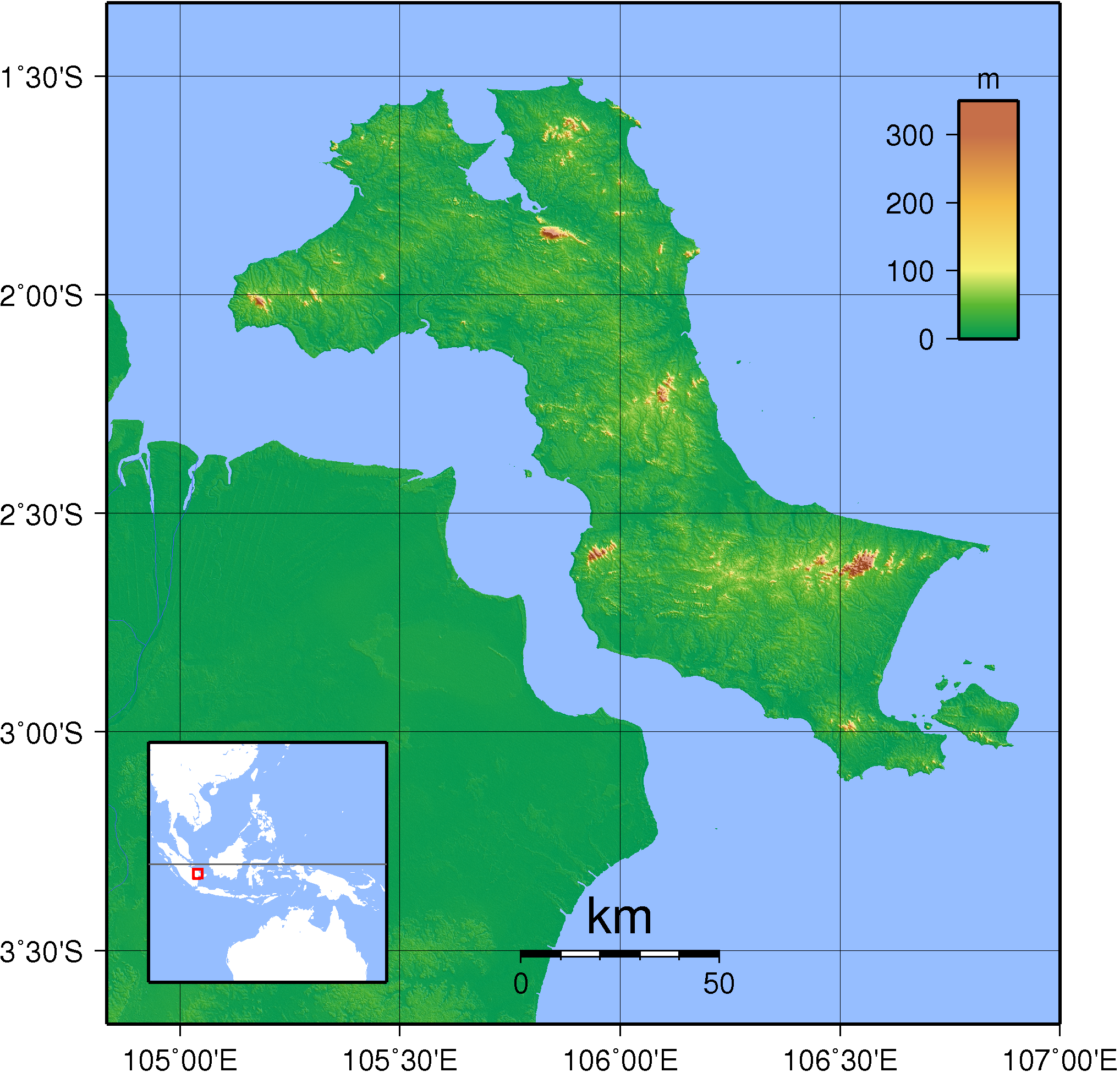
- Bangka Strait and Bangka Island

- Location relative to Sumatra
- Coordinates: 2°34′S 105°46′E
- Type: strait
- Basin countries: Indonesia
- Max. length: 134 miles (216 km)
- Min. width: 9 miles (14 km)
- Max. depth: 90 feet (27 m)
- References: Selat Bangka: Indonesia National Geospatial-Intelligence Agency, Bethesda, MD, USA

Bangka Strait is the strait that separates the island of Sumatra from Bangka Island (Indonesian: Pulau Bangka) in the Java Sea, Indonesia. The strait is approximately 134 miles (216 km) long, with a width varying from about 30 miles (48 km) to 9 miles (14 km).

== See also ==
- Japanese cruiser Ashigara
- List of straits
