= La Désirade Passage =

Strait in the Caribbean

- Canal de La Désirade (French)
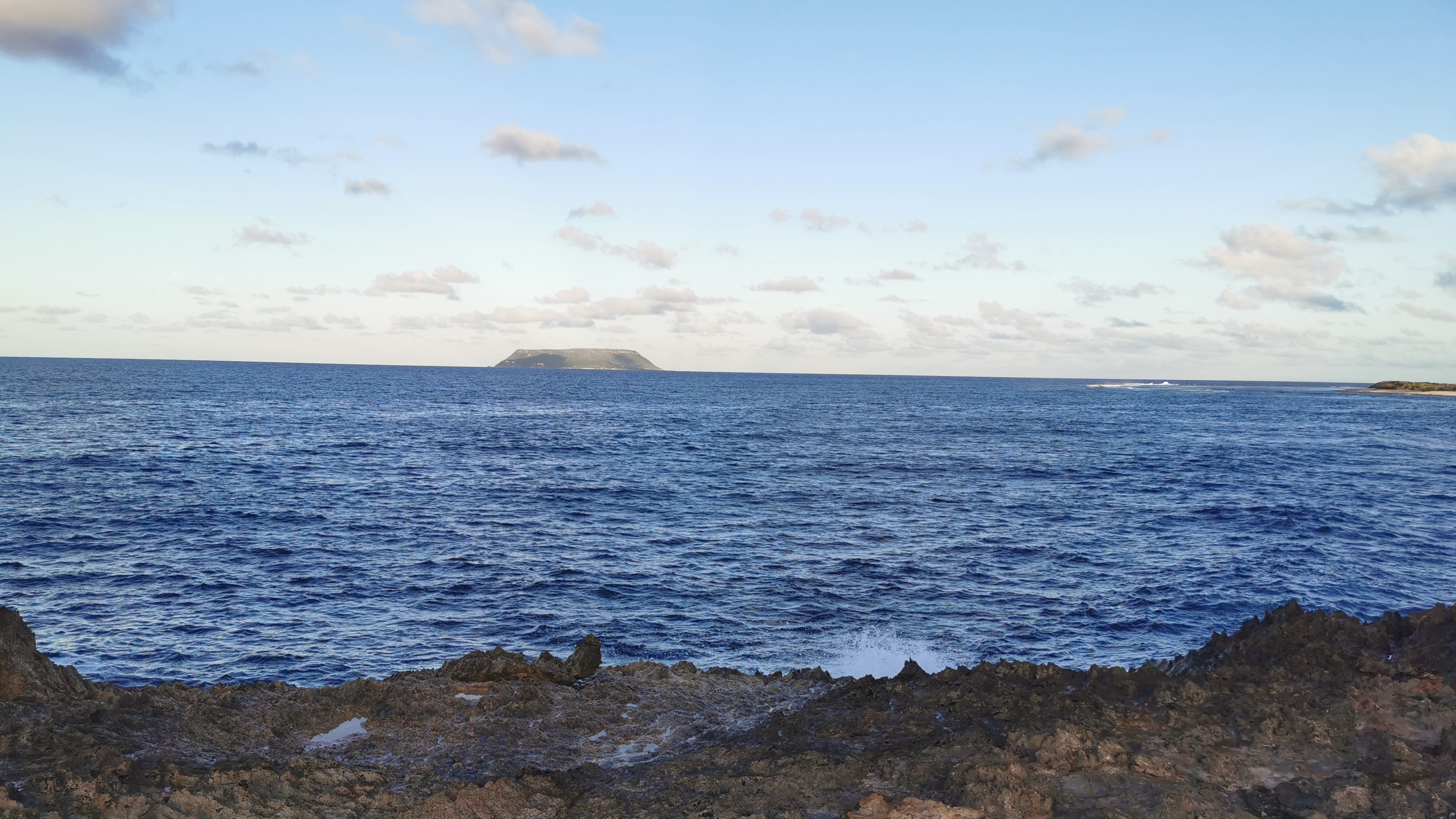
- La Désirade Passage as seen from Grand Terre, 29 June 2020

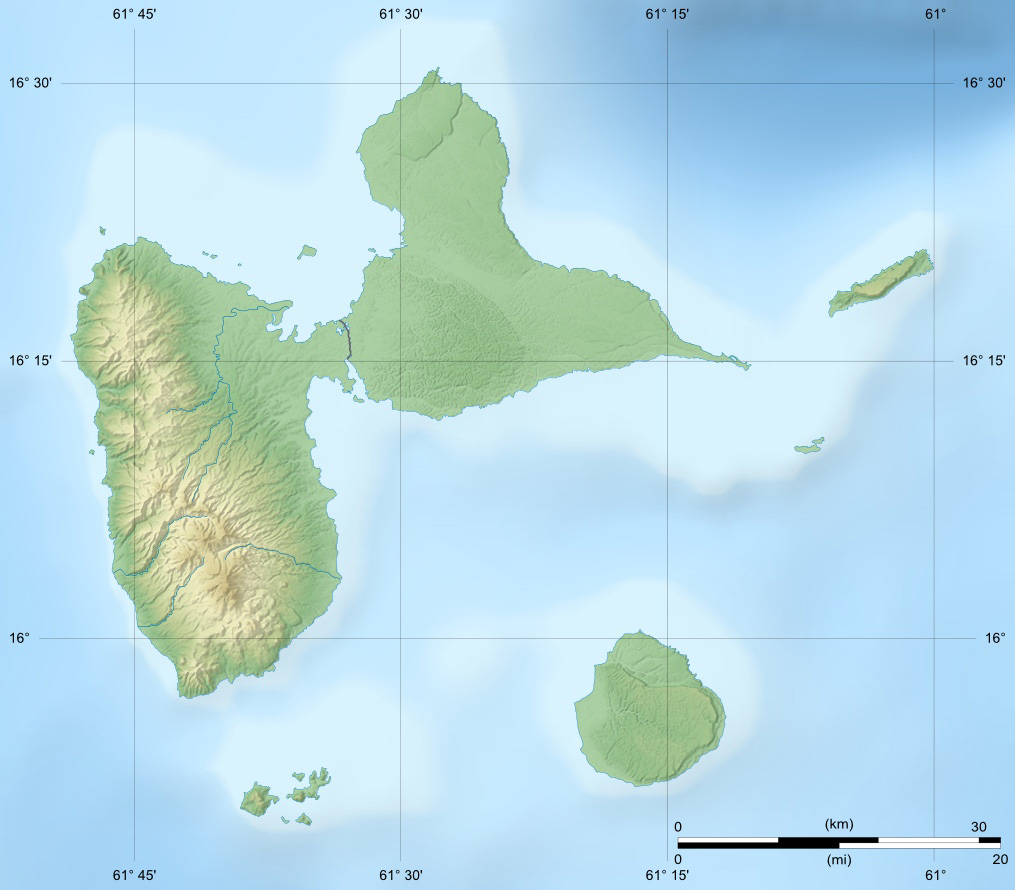
- Location within Guadeloupe Location within Lesser Antilles Location within the Caribbean
- Coordinates: 16°16′31″N 61°08′10″W

La Désirade Passage (French: Canal de La Désirade) is a strait in the Caribbean. It separates the island of la Désirade, from Grande-Terre (Guadeloupe).

== History ==
The waters of the La Désirade Passage have long been known to be very dangerous and the crossings were historically perilous, at least until the arrival of new ferry vessels.

But there is also, and perhaps above all, a historical reason related to the fact that in the eighteenth century, the island La Désirade was endowed with a leprosarium. In addition, the island was also used as a land of exile for the undesirables of the king's court.
