= Skog Passage =

Antarctic channel

Skog Passage (63°18′00″S 56°29′00″W) is a narrow channel in Antarctic waters, 0.2 nautical miles (370 m) wide, between the Madder Cliffs on the west end of Joinville Island, and an unnamed island, connecting Suspiros Bay and an unnamed body of water. It was named for Captain Peter Skog who has been on cruise ships in Antarctic waters since 1973. During that time he continually took soundings of poorly charted areas to ensure the safety of landings, and the soundings have been used to enhance British Admiralty Charts. In 1998, as master of MS Explorer, Captain Skog became the first person to pilot a cruise ship through this channel.
