= William Wilson (Bombay Marine officer) =

Bombay Marine officer (1715–1795)

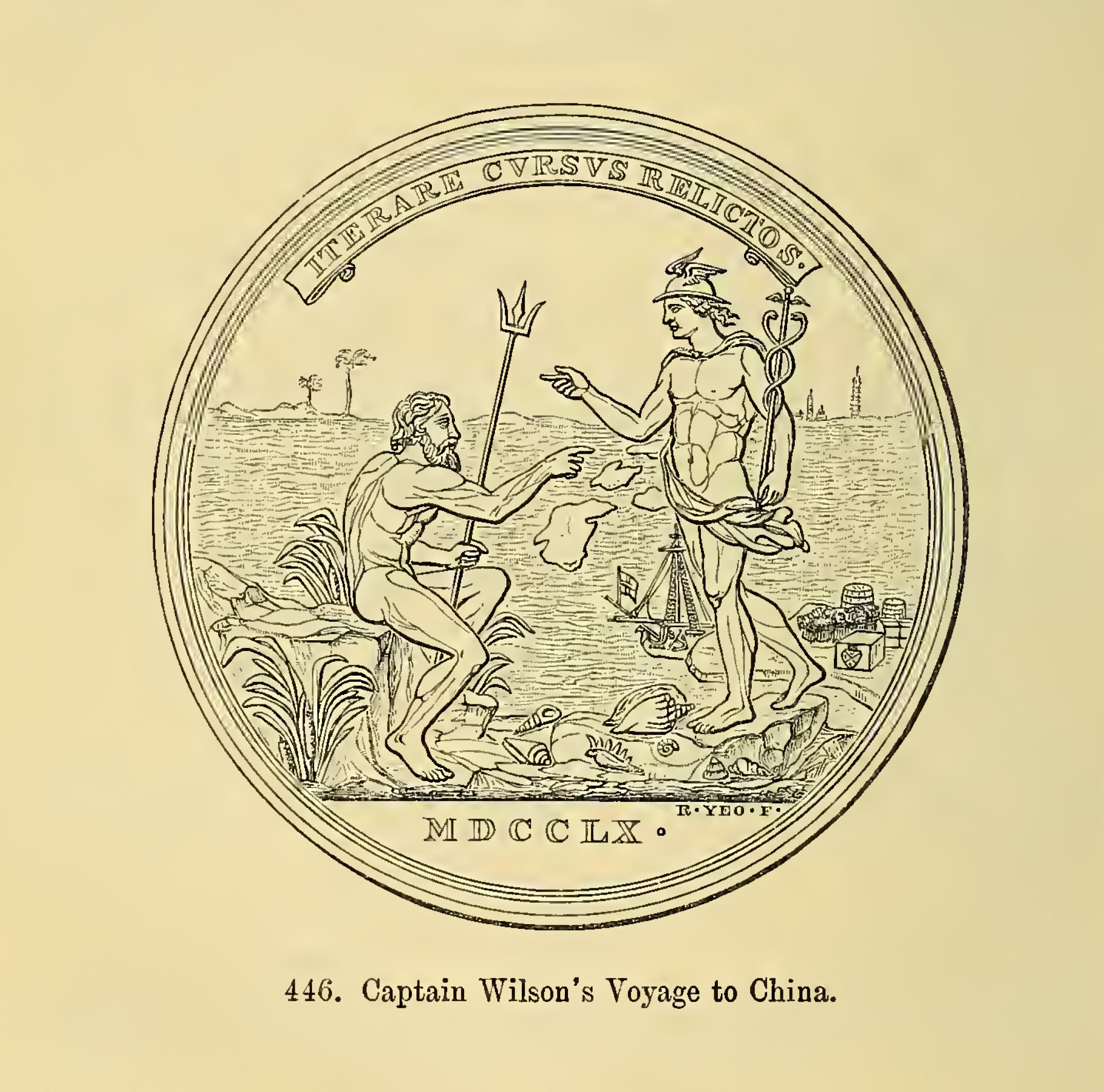
Gold medal commemorating Wilson's Voyage to China in 1760. Neptune, seated on a rock, points out the new route to Mercury.

Commodore William Wilson (1715 – 5 June 1795) was a Bombay Marine officer who served in the War of the Austrian Succession. He is best known for opening up a new route in the East Indies that allowed navigation to China at any time of year.

== Early life ==
William Wilson was born in 1715. He joined the East India Company (EIC) as a sailor at the age of 14, and worked his way up the ranks until Wilson was commissioned into the Bombay Marine in 1744 and received his first command, the 30-gun frigate HCS Great Britain. Britain was then at war with France and Spain as part of the War of the Austrian Succession, and he fought several successful actions against French and Spanish ships. His next command was the East Indiaman Suffolk, which had been launched in 1749.

In 1752, sailing from London to Madras, he had the 16-year-old Alexander Dalrymple as a passenger, travelling to his first assignment with the company. Wilson got on well with the young man, and they became lasting friends. In 1757, during the Seven Years' War, Wilson in Suffolk was escorting two merchant ships from China to England. He encountered two French ships of the line off the coast of South Africa, and was able to beat them off. As a result of this he was promoted to "commodore and commander of all ships in the Company's service", and given command of the East Indiaman Pitt.

In September 1758 Wilson arrived back in Madras with Pitt. He was intending to continue to Canton, in China, but had been delayed, and it was too late in the season to sail by the standard route through the South China Sea as the contrary north-east Monsoon would start in October. The normal procedure would have been to wait several months for the return of the south-west monsoon, but Wilson was thinking of a different route, heading south-east to Batavia, now Djakarta, then east and north-east to the north-west coast of New Guinea, then north-west to Canton, with the monsoon winds on his beam.

This route was longer, and parts of it were not well known to British sailors, but the winds were favourable. Wilson discussed this with Dalrymple, who was able to confirm its practicality on the basis of his knowledge of voyages in the previous century. Wilson took this route, and successfully completed his voyage six months earlier than expected. This was important for the company, as the route became a standard alternative that opened up China navigation at any time of year. In recognition of this service, the Company rewarded him with a gold medal.

Wilson resigned his commission in 1762, and retired to the village of Great Ayton, Yorkshire. He had married in 1755 to Rachel Jackson, who was from Richmond, Yorkshire, and this may have been the reason for the choice of home. They had nine children, of whom five survived. Ayton was the boyhood home of James Cook. Cook maintained his ties with the area, and met Wilson who soon became a firm friend. Dalrymple also visited Wilson in Ayton. Wilson had a long retirement, and was active in the community, serving as a magistrate. He died on 5 June 1795 and was buried at Ayton Church, where his son erected a monument in his memory.
