= Saint-Barthélemy Channel =

Strait in the Caribbean Sea

Coordinates: 17°59′N 62°59′W

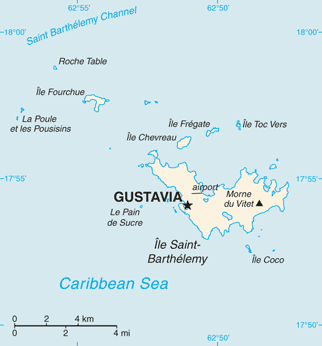
Saint-Barthélemy Channel is to the north of Saint-Barthélemy

Saint-Barthélemy Channel is a strait in the Caribbean Sea that separates the French overseas collectivity of Saint Barthélemy and the island of Saint Martin, which is divided between a separate French overseas collectivity and Sint Maarten, a constituent country of the Kingdom of the Netherlands. The channel is about 5 miles wide. The maritime boundary between Saint Bathélemy and Sint Maarten runs through Saint-Barthélemy Channel.
