= Fam Islands =

Islands in the Raja Ampat Archipelago, Indonesia

Coordinates: 0.6605°S 130.2906°E

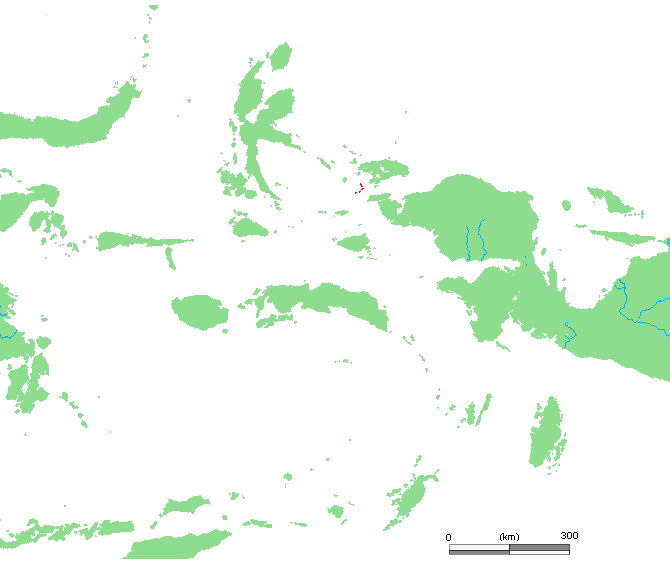
Fam islands lies in the straits between Waigeo and Bird's Head in Indonesia

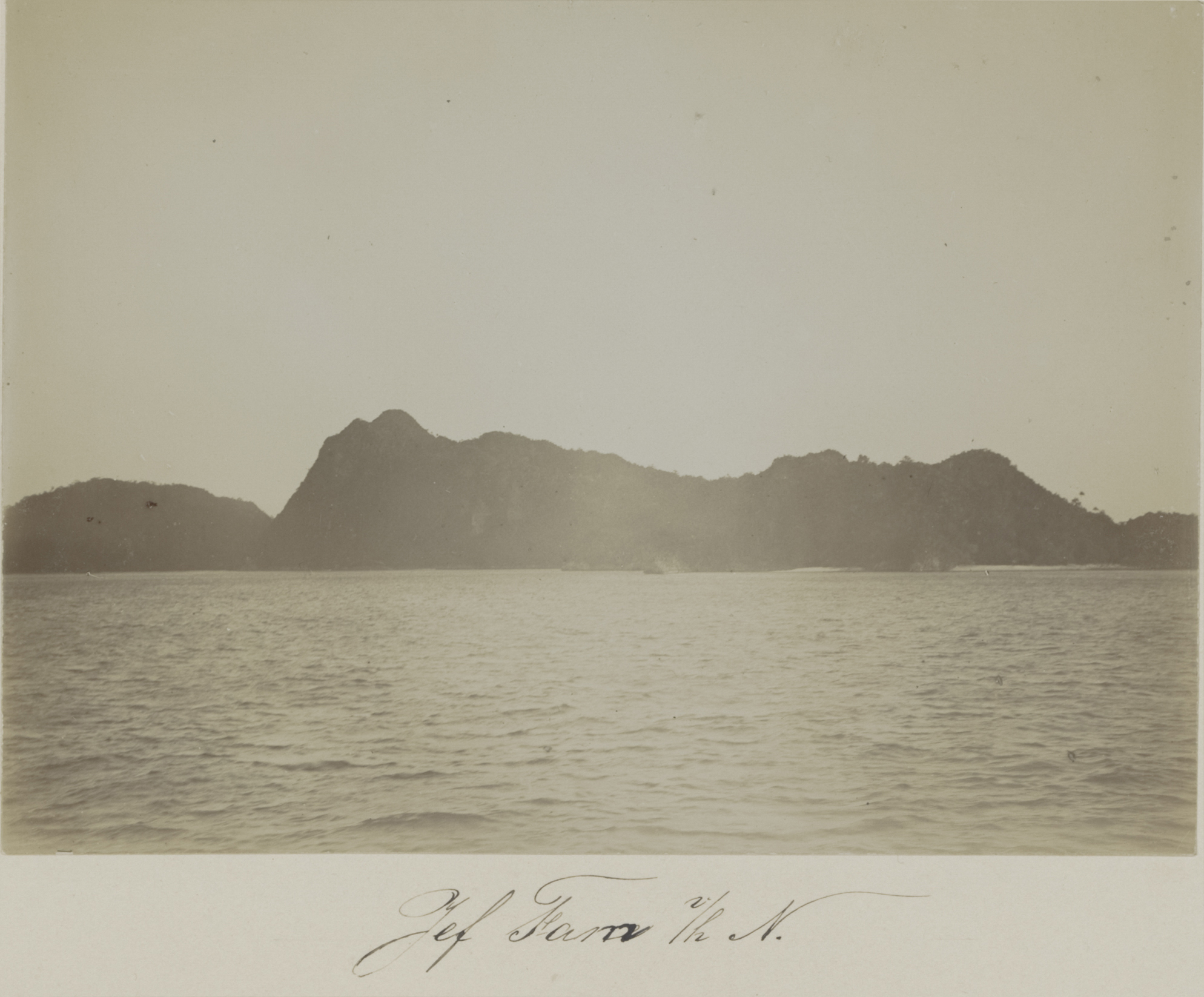
Penemu seen from the North. Photo taken during the Siboga Expedition, 1899-1900.

Fam Islands (Indonesian: Kepulauan Fam) are a group of islands in the Raja Ampat Archipelago, which are administered as part of the Indonesian province of Southwest Papua. The main islands are Fam, Penemu (a.k.a. Piaynemo, Fam Besar), Inus and Yar. They lie northwest of Batanta island, in the straits between Waigeo and Batanta and New Guinea.
