= Main Channel (Ontario) =

Coordinates: 45.346388°N 81.812222°W

The Main Channel is a strait that separates Lake Huron from Georgian Bay and Ontario's Manitoulin Island from the Bruce Peninsula.

Prior to the formation of the Main Channel, a land bridge directly connected Manitoulin Island to the Bruce Peninsula, allowing for easier land-based migration along the western shore of Georgian Bay.

Several islands can be found within the strait, including the popular tourist destination of Flowerpot Island, and the strait is the site of Canada's marine-based national park, Fathom Five National Marine Park.
