= Marie-Galante Passage =

Strait in the Caribbean

- Canal de Marie-Galante (French)
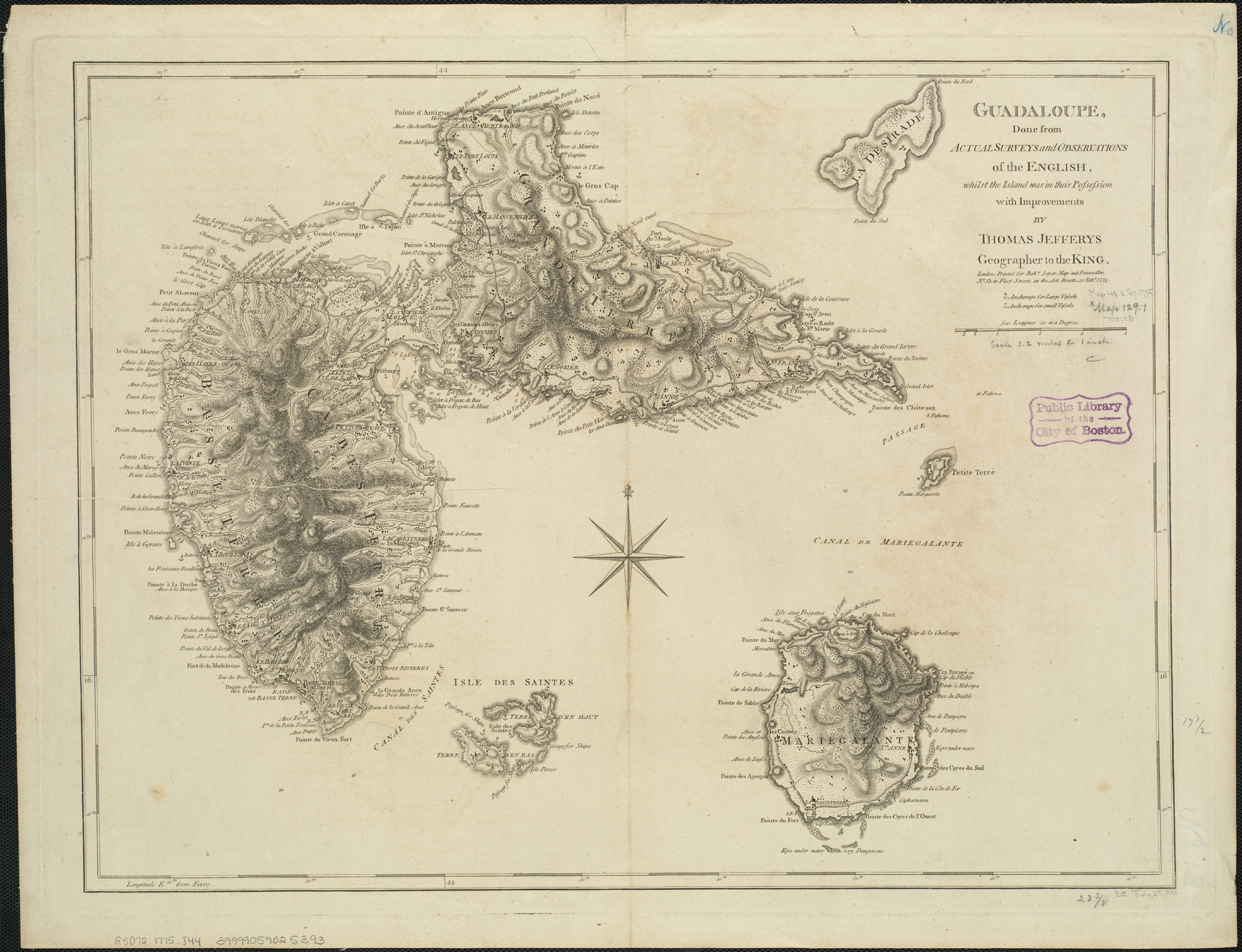
- Marie-Galante Passage, indicated in French on this 1775 map: Canal de Marie-Galante

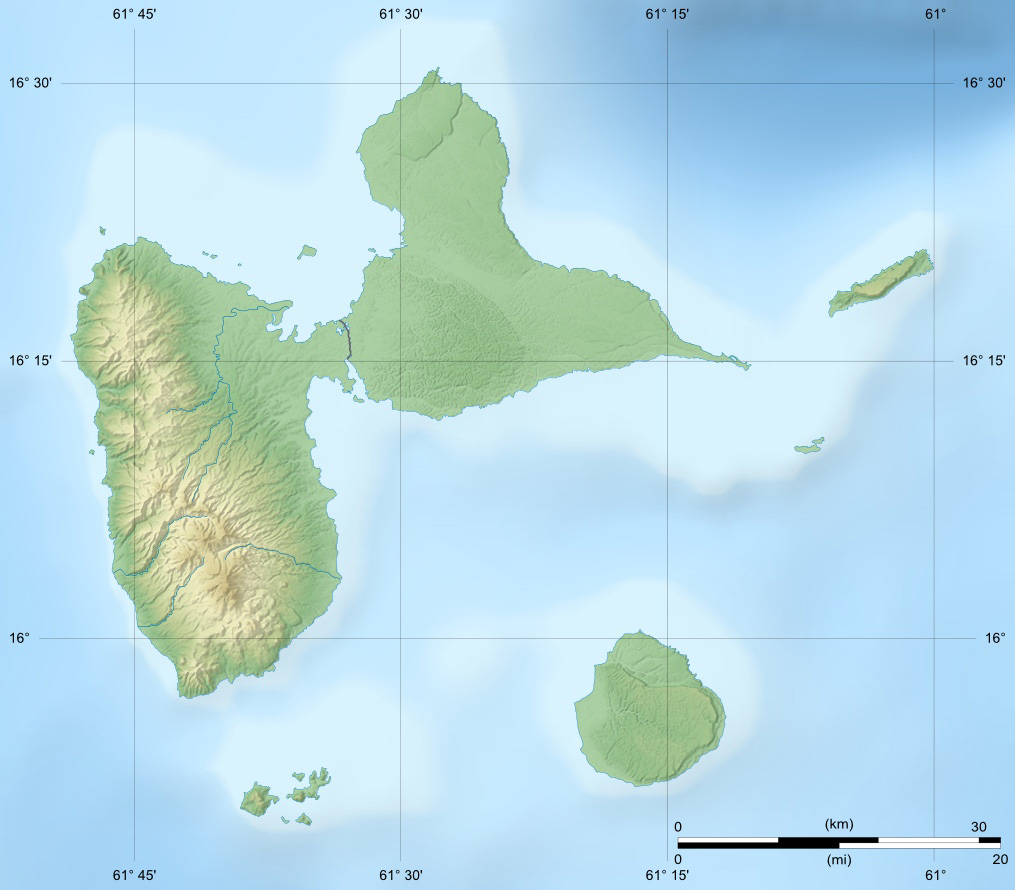
- Location within Guadeloupe Location within Lesser Antilles Location within the Caribbean
- Coordinates: 16.04°N 61.19°W

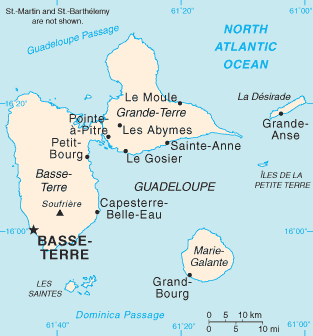
Marie-Galante Passage, located between Marie-Galante and Guadeloupe

Marie-Galante Passage (French: Canal de Marie-Galante) is a strait in the Caribbean. It separates the island of Marie-Galante from Guadeloupe and Îles des Saintes.
