= Dampier Strait (Indonesia) =

Strait in Indonesia

- Selat Dampier (Indonesian)
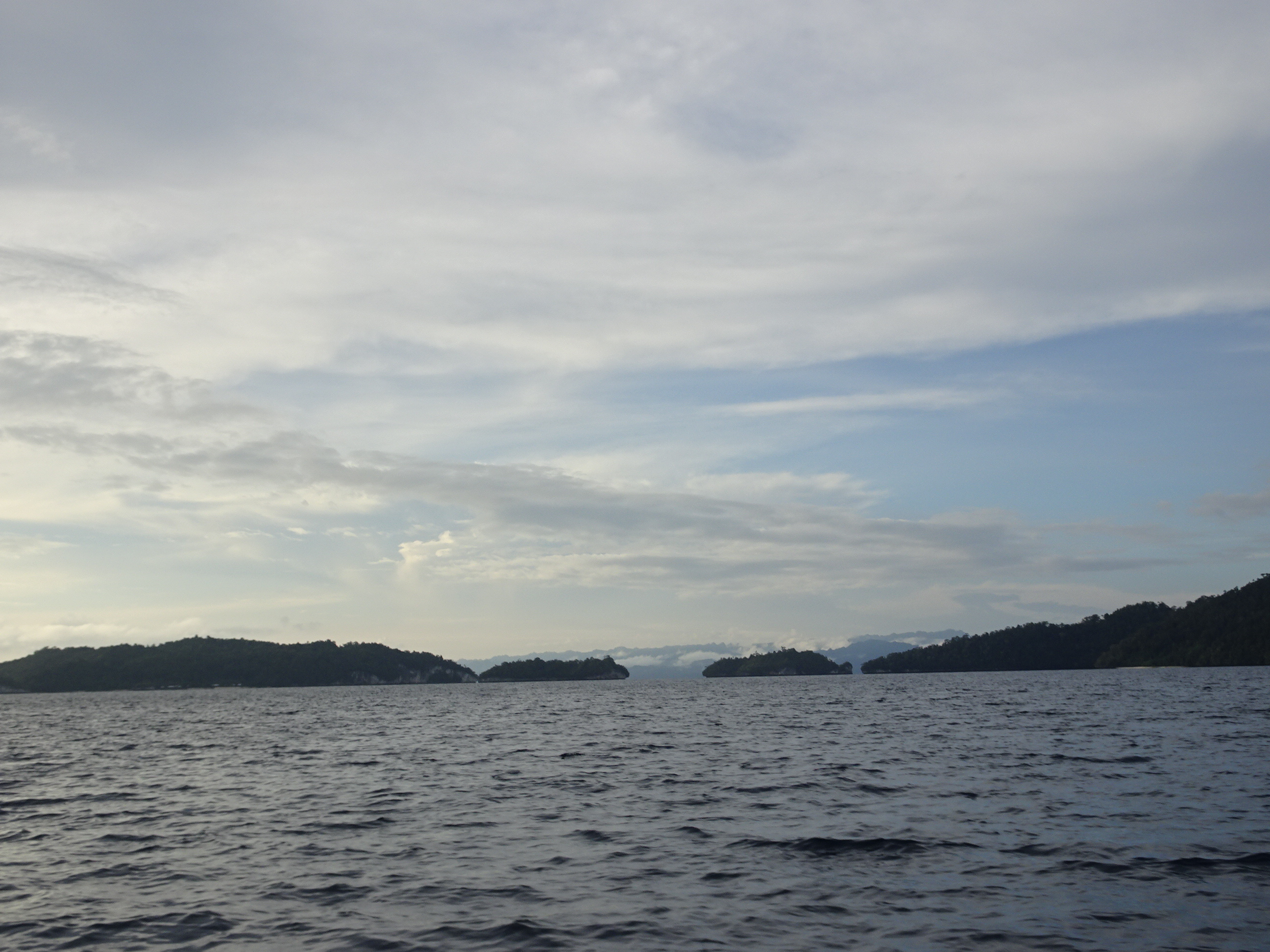
- View of Dampier strait at 20 mi from Sorong.

- Location within Western New Guinea
- Coordinates: 00°40′S 130°40′E
- Type: strait
- Basin countries: Indonesia
- References: Selat Dampier: Indonesia National Geospatial-Intelligence Agency, Bethesda, MD, USA

Dampier Strait (sometimes also known as Augusta's Strait) is a strait in the Indonesian province of Southwest Papua that separates the Raja Ampat islands of Waigeo and Batanta. It is named after British navigator William Dampier.

== Geography ==
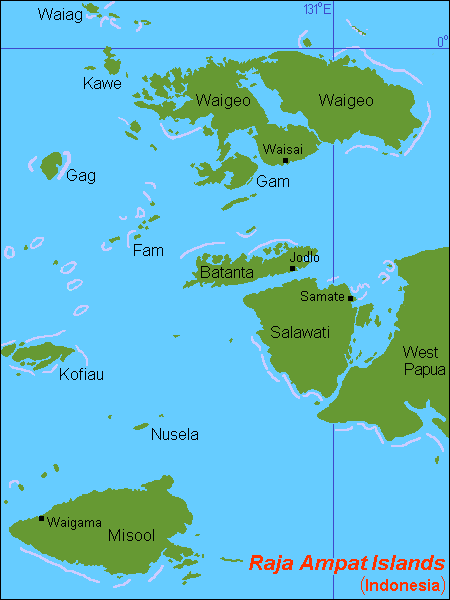
Map of Raja Ampat islands, Indonesia

The Dampier Strait passes through the Indonesian archipelago of Raja Ampat (Southwest Papua). Between the islands Batanta and Gam are several islands. The largest of these is the narrow island of Mansuar. At its eastern tip are the islands of Kri and Koh. The island Arborek lies northwest. South of Mansuar are Augusta Island, Duiven Island, Djerief Island and Mainsfield Island. At the western end of the strait are the Woodford Reefs and the Fam Islands. Other small islands are located near the coast of the main islands.
