= Mestizo art =

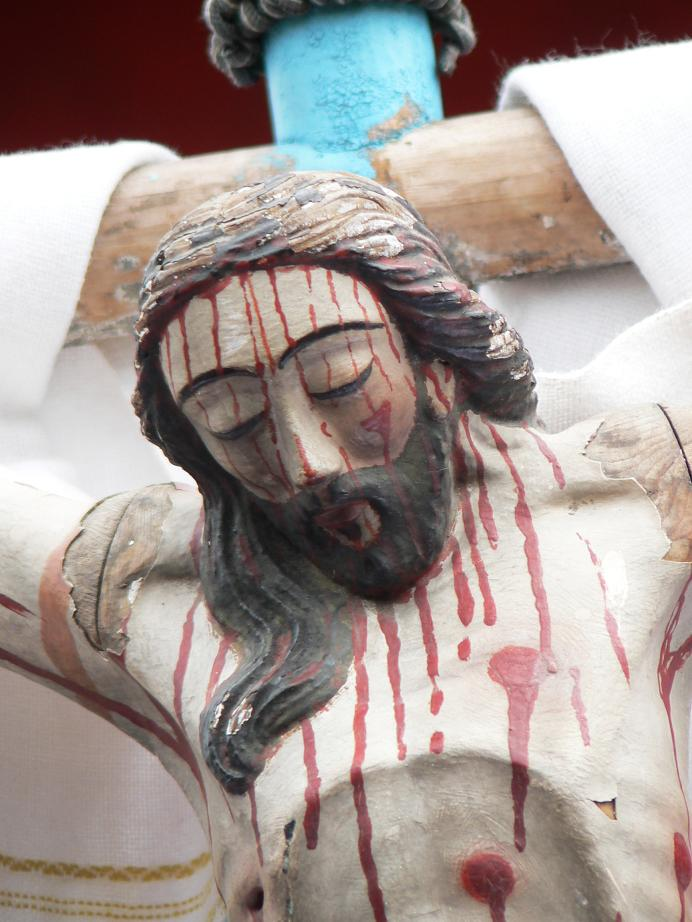
Procession Christ, Church of Caguach (18th century) is an example of Chilote School of Religious Imagery.

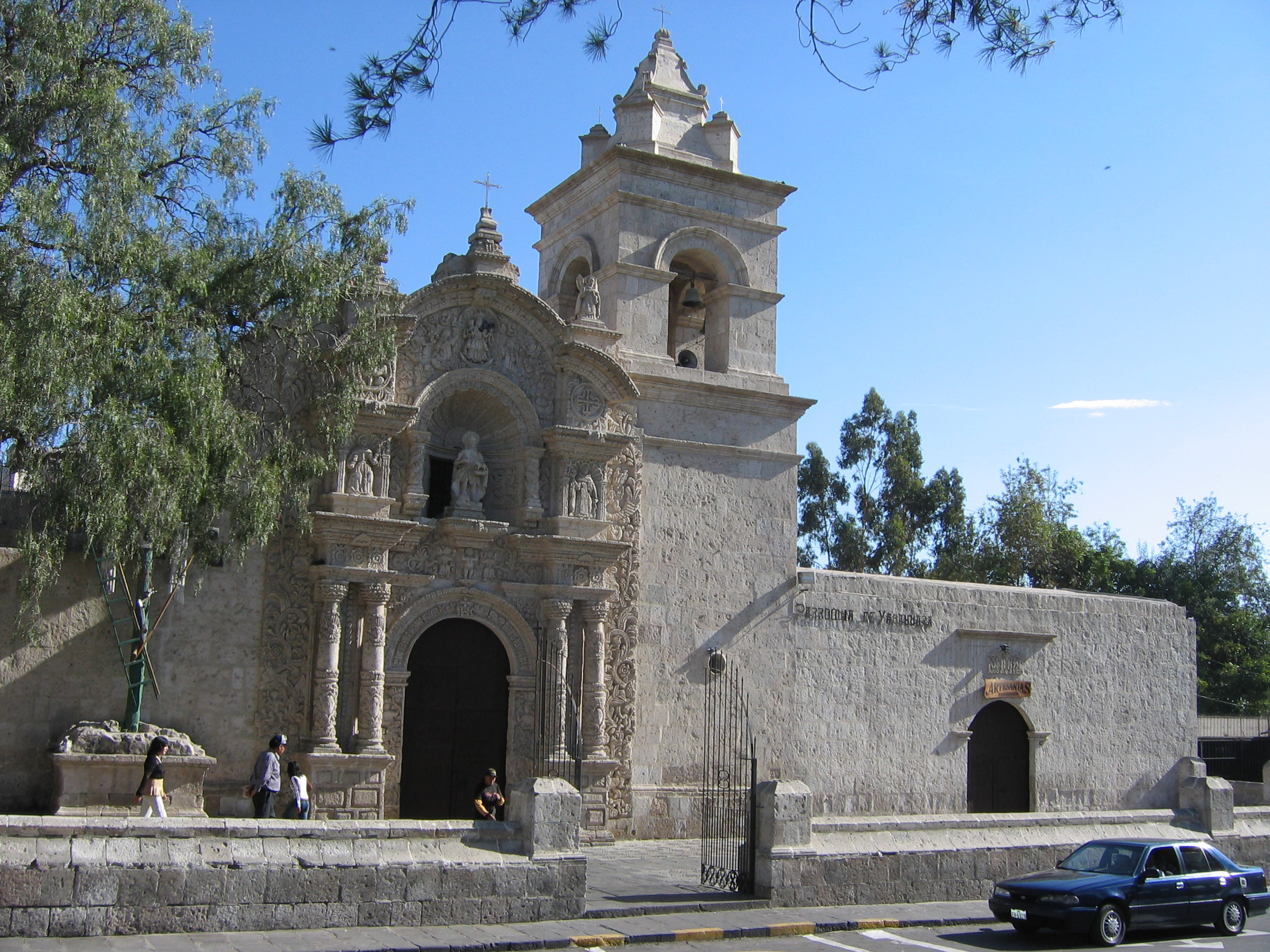
San Juan Bautista Church in Yanahuara District is an example of Andean Baroque, a mix of European Baroque and Andean culture.

Mestizo art (Spanish: arte mestizo) is syncretic art based on European styles adapting to Indigenous sensibilities in the Americas and the Philippines. Mestizo art is part of the Mestizo culture, the culture that emerged, alongside individuals called Mestizos, from the interaction of Spanish conquerors and the Indigenous peoples of the Americas. According to Jaime Barrios Peña, Mestizo art has to be understood in a context where neither pure races or pure cultures exists, and that the process of mestizaje goes beyond biological aspects.

One of the best-known examples of the Mestizo style is the adaptation made to Late Baroque churches of the 18th century. The ornamentation of their churches has a "two layer quality" observed in carvings and reliefs. According to Britannica:

The areas producing Mestizo-style churches—the southern Peruvian highlands and Upper Peru (now Bolivia), southern and western Mexico, and Guatemala—were centres of high pre-Columbian civilizations and still contained a largely Indigenous or mixed Spanish-Amerindian population, and so the Mestizo style reflected their traditions more successfully than a literally copied version of the European Baroque

== Examples ==
- Andean Baroque
  - Cusco School
  - Quito School
    - Virgin of Quito
- Chilote School of Religious Imagery
- Churches of Chiloé
- Mate coquimbano
- Mexican muralism
- New Spanish Baroque
- Earthquake Baroque

== Bibliography ==
- Barrios Peña, Jaime. Arte mestizo en América-Latina (Aproximación psicodinámica) (Ph.D. thesis) (in Spanish). Buenos Aires: Universidad del Salvador.
