= Church of Quinchao =

UNESCO World Heritage Site
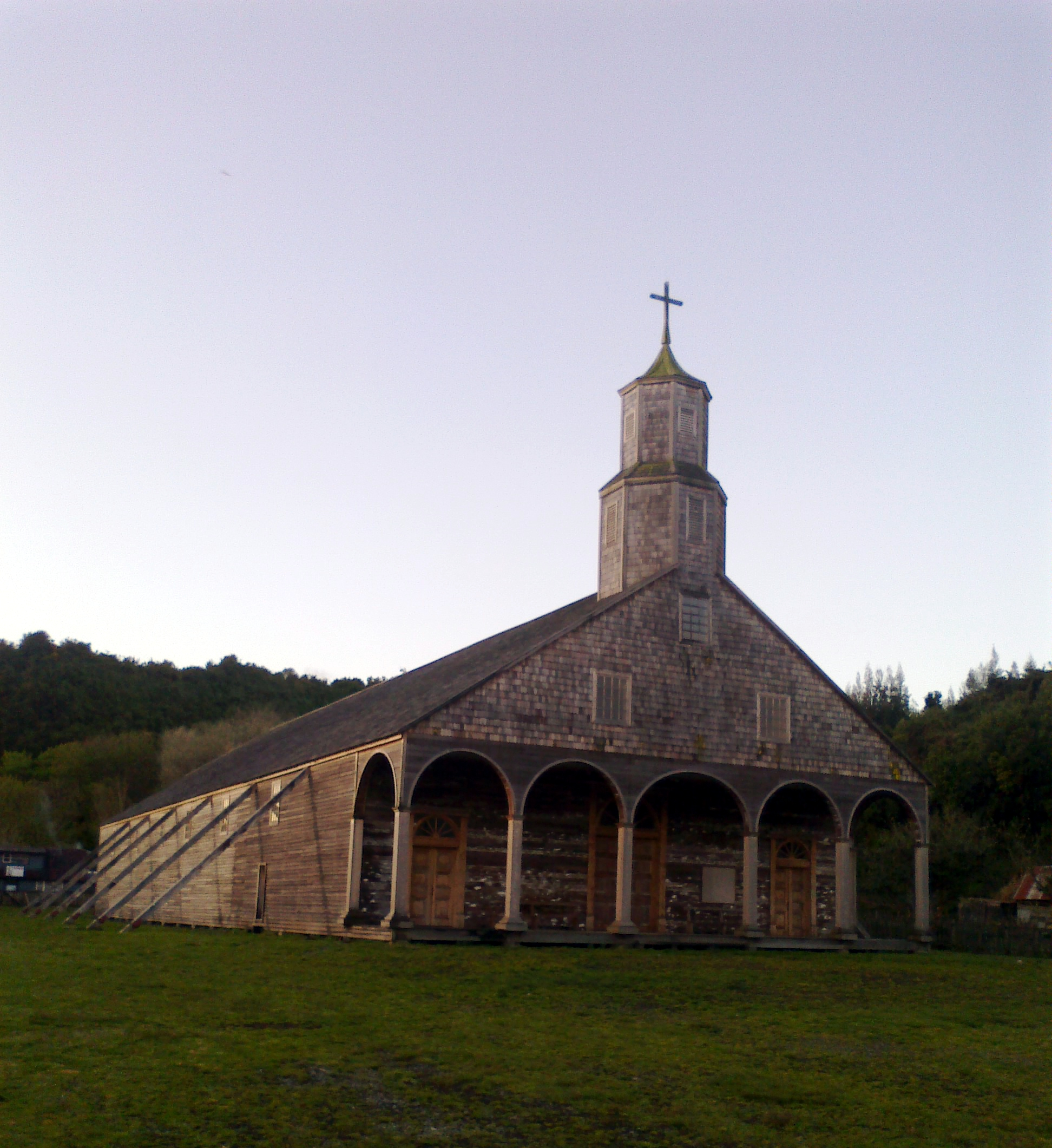
- Church of Quinchao in mid-2011, following its restoration

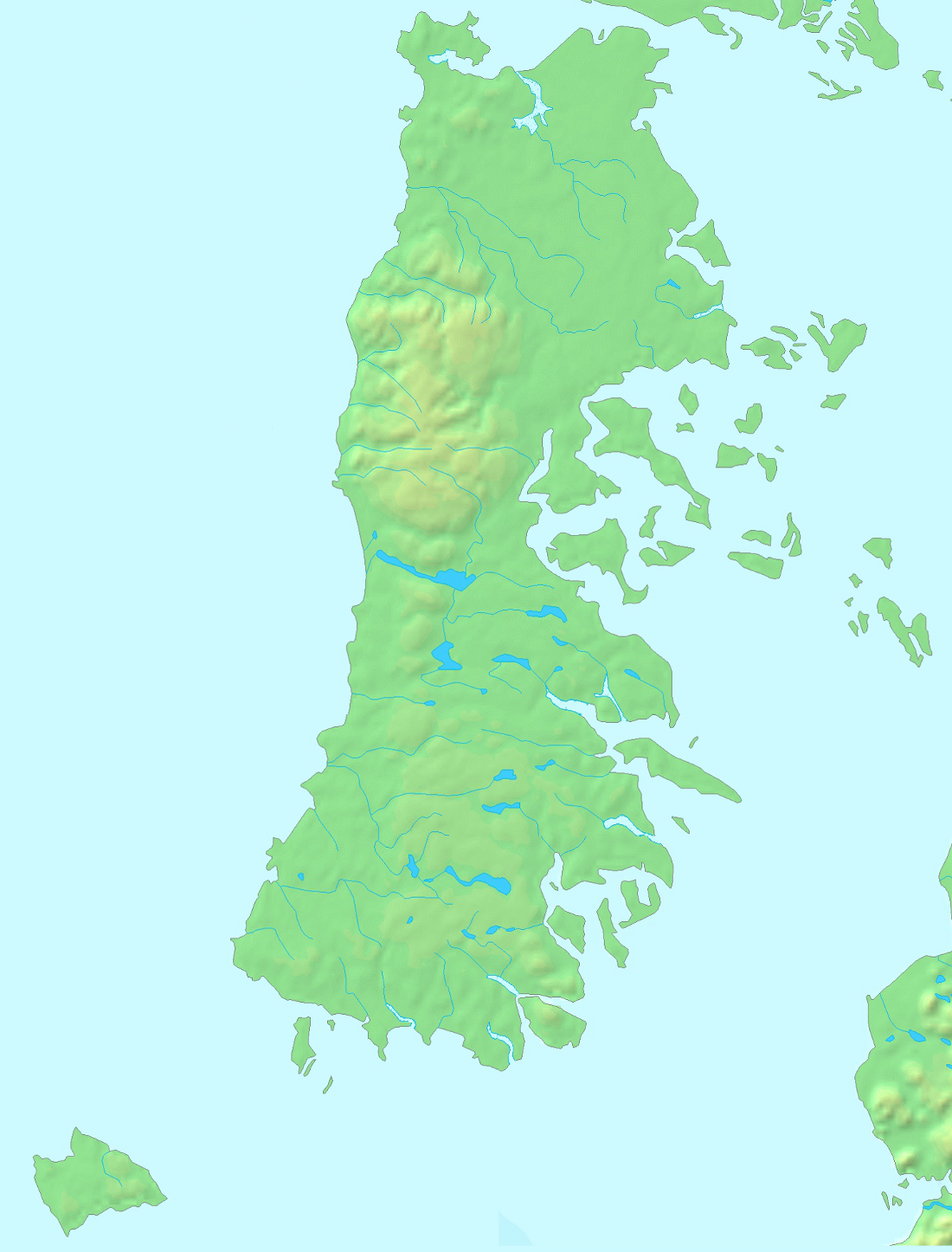
- Location within Chiloé Location within Los Lagos Location within Chile
- Location: Quinchao Island, Quinchao, Chiloé Province, Los Lagos Region, Chile
- Part of: Churches of Chiloé
- Criteria: Cultural: (ii), (iii)
- Reference: 971-002
- Inscription: 2000 (24th Session)
- Area: 1.286 ha (3.18 acres)
- Coordinates: 42°32′06″S 73°25′38″W

The Iglesia de Quinchao (Church of Quinchao) is located in the village of Quinchao, in the Chiloé Province, Los Lagos Region, Chile. It is one of the main stops on a pilgrimage path on Chiloé.

It is one of the 16 Churches of Chiloé, a UNESCO World Heritage Site (since 30 November 2000) and was declared one of the National Monuments of Chile on 26 July 1971.

The patron saint of the church is Our Lady of Grace, whose feast day is celebrated on 8 December. On this day hundreds of people flock to the village of Quinchao to participate in the Our Lady of Grace Festival, one of the most important religious festivals on the archipelago of Chiloé. This is the main religious festival on the archipelago after that of Jesus of Nazareth in Caguach.

This church leads one of the 24 parishes that form the Diocese of Ancud.

== Location ==
The Church boasts a front esplanade that serves as an ample atrium. It runs parallel to the sea, about one block from the coast.

== Construction ==
Construction of the church as it originally stood concluded in 1880, using wood from cypress, canelo and avellano trees. The church has subsequently undergone numerous restorations, particularly in the years 1906, 1960, 1993 and most recently in 2010. This church and the Church of Santa María de Loreto, Achao are the only churches that remain of those built by the Jesuits.

It is the largest church in Chiloé, measuring 52.8 meters long by 18.4 meters wide. The tower reaches 18.3 meters high.

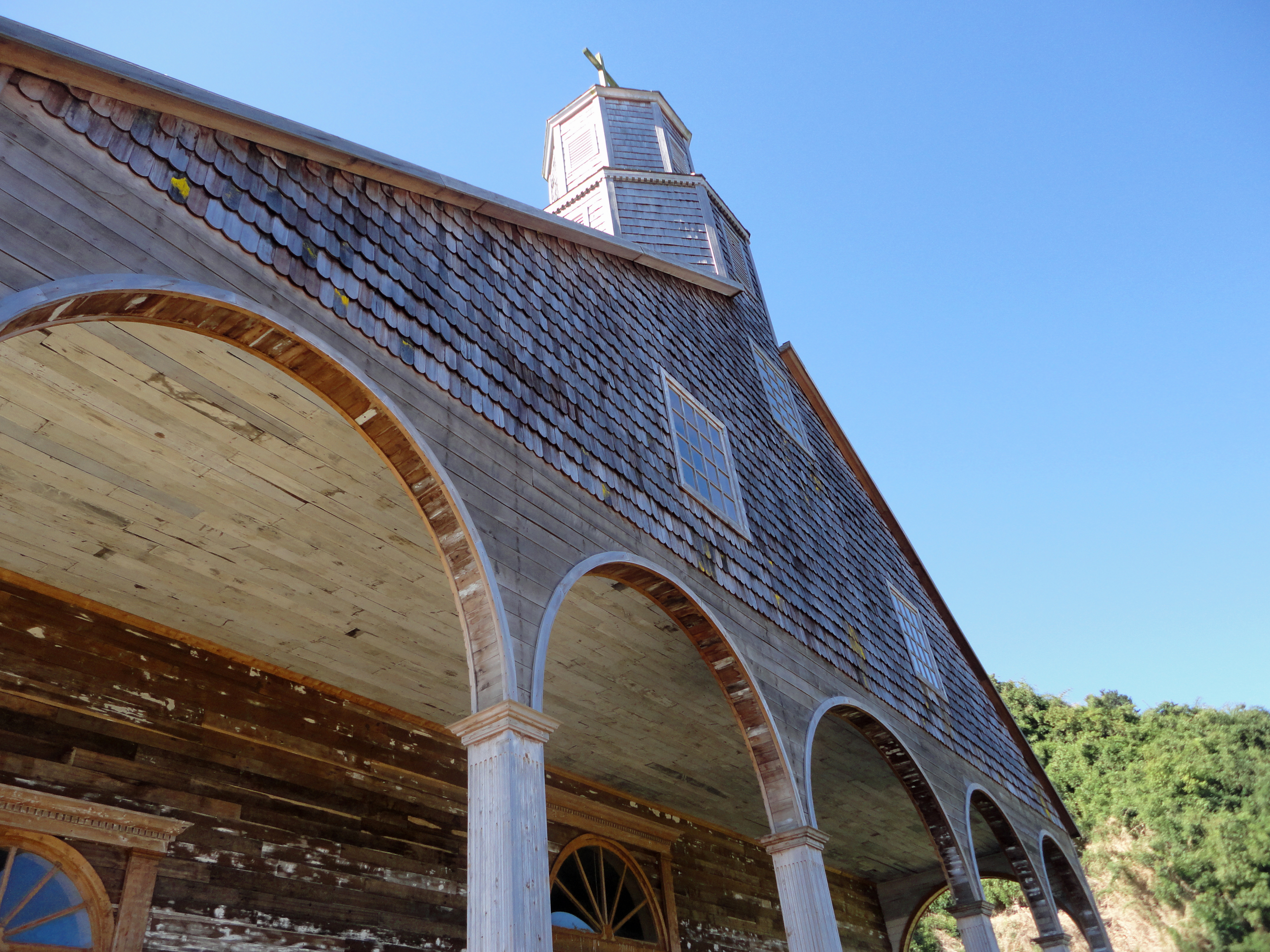
Iglesia-Quinchao

== History ==
The church site was established in 1605 and referred to before 1767. In 1906 the exterior corridors of the Church were eliminated. In the 1960s an area in the rear was eliminated. Restoration of the Church was carried out in 1993.

It was declared a UNESCO World Heritage Site in December 2000.

== Reconstruction ==
The Church had deteriorated to such an extent that it was closed in 2006. No one could enter for fear it would totally collapse. It was the first among the churches of Chiloé to be completely restored. The restoration included putting in a concrete foundation. Beams of coigüe wood and a new structural framework for the wooden floor were installed. More than 80% of the structurally significant wood had to be changed, but 95% of the extant wood was reused. 90,000 larch shingles were installed.

In its previous incarnations, the Church was made principally from coigüe, ulm, and cypress woods. Restored, there is much more larch and mañío wood. The restoration took place between 1995 and 1997. In 2006 there was a significant investment for more restoration, so the tower was taken down for meticulous reconstruction.

In 2012 the community of the Church and the Fundación Amigos de las iglesias de Chiloé (Friends of the Churches of Chiloé) were awarded a conservation prize for their work restoring the church from the National Monuments Council for the two stages of restoration that took place in 2007–2008 and 2009–2010. Patricia Mondaca was the chief architect of the project.

== See also ==
- List of Jesuit sites
