= Santa Maria di Loreto =

Santa Maria di Loreto may refer to:

- Santa Maria di Loreto (Rome), a church in Rome
- Church of Santa María de Loreto, Achao, a church in Chile
- A musical institute in Naples, where Domenico Cimarosa studied
