= Dalcahue Channel =

Coordinates: 42°23′06″S 73°39′23″W

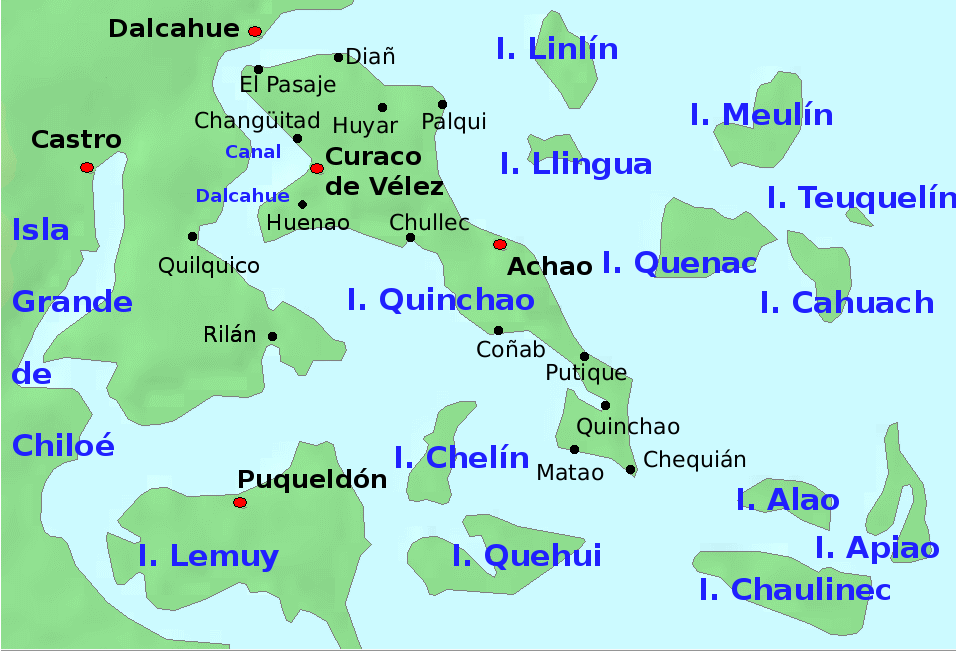
Dalcahue Channel

Dalcahue Channel (Spanish: "Canal de Dalcahue") is a body of water of the Sea of Chiloé that separates Quinchao Island from Chiloé Island, both part of the Chiloé Archipelago in southern Chile. The town of Dalcahue is located close to the narrowest part.

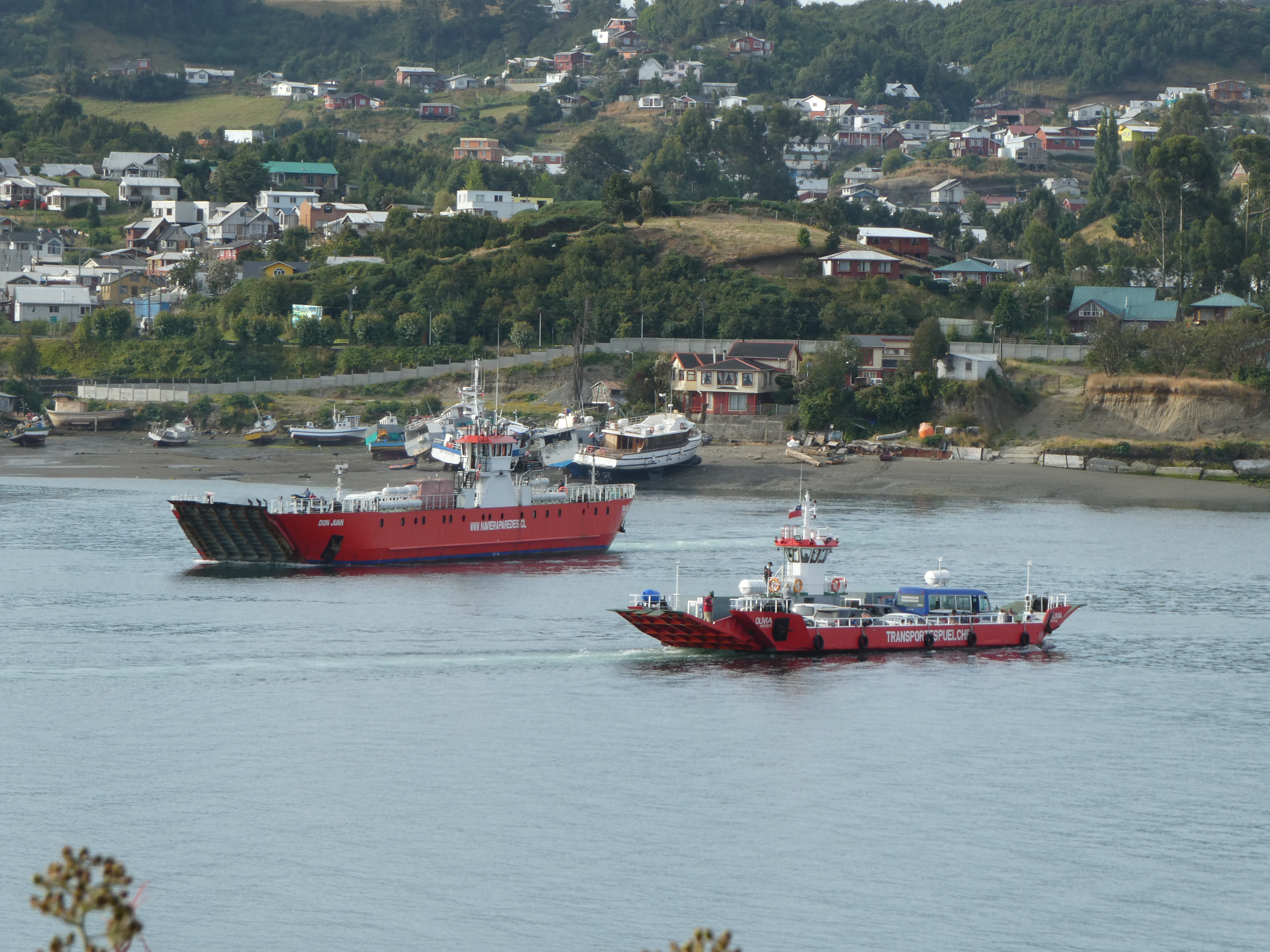
Ferries in the Dalcahue Channel.

== See also ==
- Fjords and channels of Chile
