= Chilote school of religious imagery =

Place in Chile

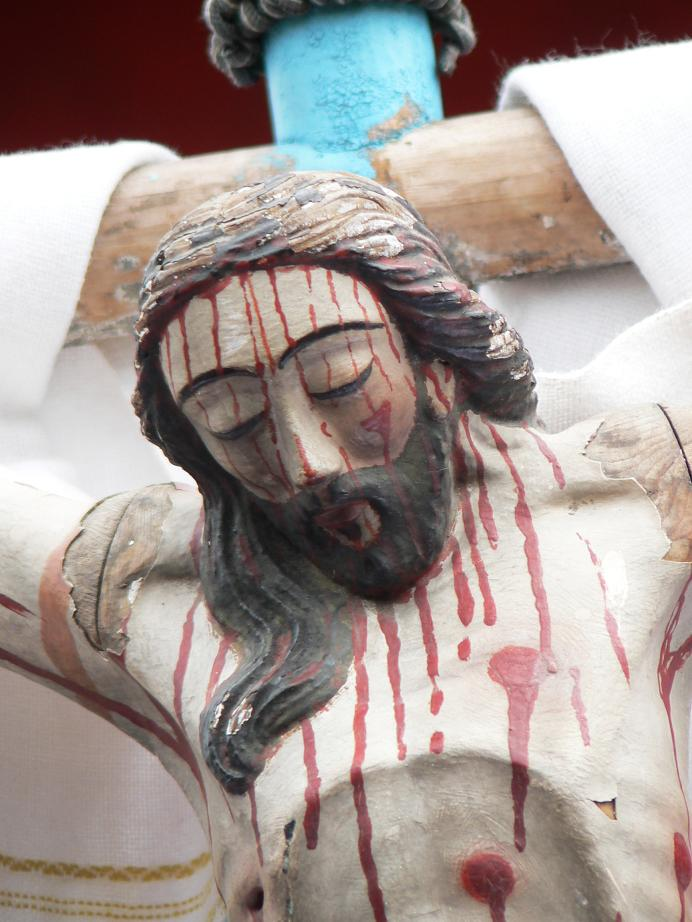
- Procession Christ, Church of Caguach (18th century); Articulated sculpture from Chilota school of imagery
- Localization: Chiloé Archipelago, Chile
- Artistic manifestation: Colonial Hispano-American Art
- Style: Religious art
- Historic period: 16th–19th century
- Number of exponents: at least 456 pieces
- Material: Polychrome wood as a typical element

The Chilote school of religious imagery (Spanish: Escuela Chilota de imaginería religiosa), or Chilote school of carving, is an artistic and cultural manifestation that developed in the Chiloé Archipelago during the 17th century on the basis of the circular movement of evangelizing established by the Jesuit missionaries, and reaches its climax in the late 19th century.

Its character of "school" lies in that these sculptures shape a "type" that altered the imagery archetypal of American and Spanish Baroque; as a product of cultural syncretism, the works of this school was developed locally and are characterized by the combination and adaptation of European, Latin American and Indigenous features. This artistic expression differs from peninsular, quiteña or cuzqueña artistic production: there can be remarkable differences in technique, materials and style.
