= Chauques Islands =

Islands of the Chiloé archipelago, Chile

Chaques Islands
Native name: Islas Chauques
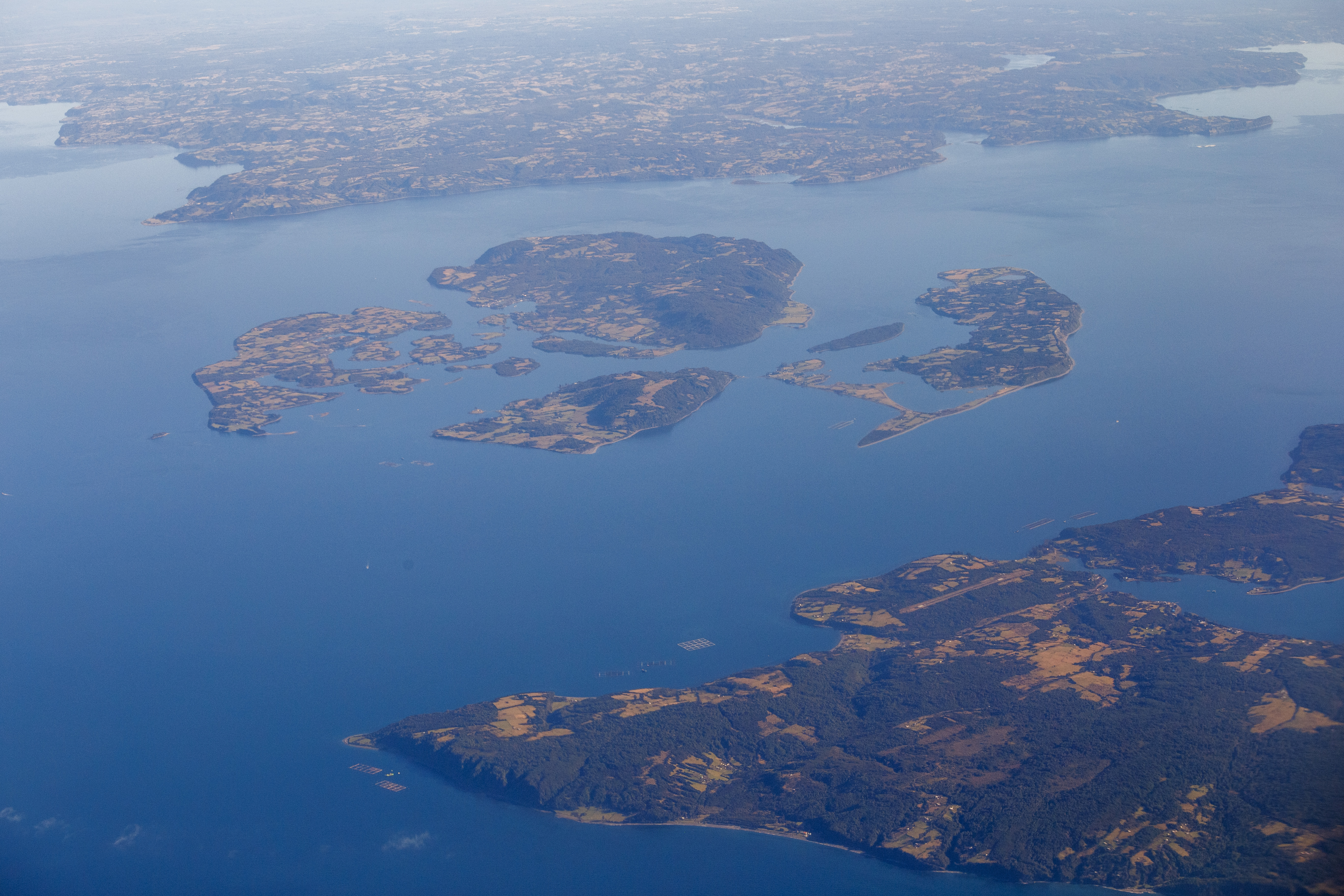
- Interactive map of Chaques Islands

Geography
- Location: Chiloé Archipelago
- Coordinates: 42.298°S 73.202°W
- Major islands: Mechuque, Añihué, Taucolón, Cheniao, Butachauques, Aulín

Administration
- Chile
- Region: Los Lagos
- Province: Chiloé
- Commune: Quemchi

The Chauques Islands (Spanish: Islas Chauques) are a group of Chilean islands belonging to the Chiloé archipiélago.

== Population ==
According to the 2017 Chilean census, the group of islands has 1277 inhabitants, of which 695 live in western Chauques and 582 in eastern Chauques. Villa Mechuque, with 129 inhabitants, is the largest hamlet in the archipelago.

== Connectivity ==
The archipelago has nine passenger ferry services connecting it to the rest of Chiloé, all of them subsidized.
