= Caguach =

Island of the Chiloé Archipelago in Chile

Isla Caguach

Geography
- Location: Commune of Quinchao, Chiloé Archipelago
- Coordinates: 42.491°S 73.265°W
- Area: 10.7 km^{2} (4.1 sq mi)
- Width: 2.9 km (1.8 mi)

Administration
- Chile

Demographics
- Population: 515

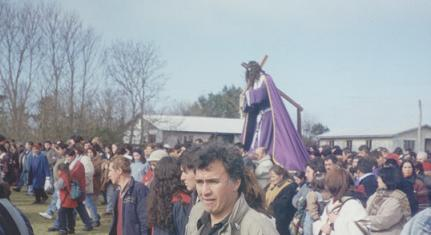
Procession for Jesus of Nazareth on Caguach island (30 August 2000).

Caguach or Cahuach is one of the most well-known smaller islands of the Chiloé Archipelago, in the south of Chile, forming part of the commune of Quinchao. The island is in the shape of a crescent moon and contains the sectors of Capilla Antigua, El Estero, El Pasaje and La Capilla. Caguach is to the east of the archipelago, one and a half hours by boat from Achao and four from Chiloé's capital, Castro.

The island is known for its annual ceremony in honour of Jesus of Nazareth, involving a procession with the Cahuach statue of Jesus through the island's esplanade, accompanied by music and dancing. The island of Caguach is also called 'the island of devotion' because of this religious festival, one of the most important in the south of Chile. The celebration is traditionally held each year on August 30. Since the turn of the 21st century, it has been held on the third Sunday of January, so as to take full advantage of folklore tourism during summer.

The Church of Caguach, at the center of festivities, is one of the 16 Churches of Chiloé that were designated as Chilean National Monuments in 1979 and UNESCO World Heritage Sites on 30 November 2000.

== See also ==
- Church of Caguach
- Quinchao
