= Mate coquimbano =

Drinking vessel

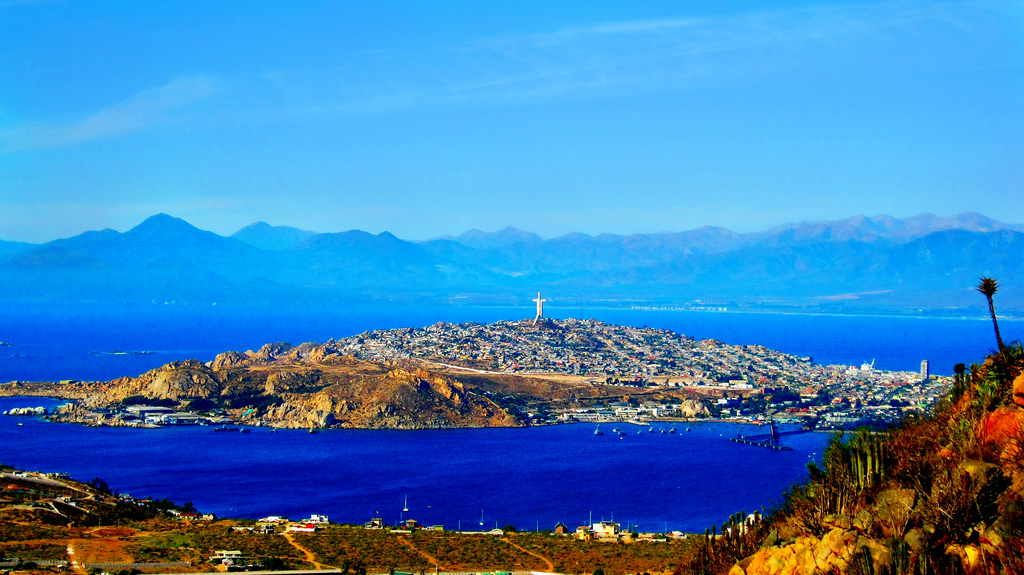
View of the port of Coquimbo, the namesake of Mate coquimbano.

Mate coquimbano is a mate cup style produced in 19th century in the area near the port of Coquimbo in northern Chile. The Mate coquimbano is typically made of low grade silver alloy with sparse geometric or vegetal motiff decoration made of copper or bronze. The silver used originated in the mining district of Chañarcillo, where a silver rush took place in the 1830s and 1840s. Being cheaper than mate cups of purer silver and gold Mate coquimbano cups were common among the populace.

Contrary to many contemporary mate cups in Chile that had until then followed European fashionable styles such as Baroque and Neoclassicism the Mate coquimbano had evident mestizo influences. Over time, aspects of the Mate coquimbano style diffused into the neighboring Andean region of Argentina.

== See also ==
- Alicanto
- Carbuncle
- History of yerba mate
- Juan Godoy
