= History of yerba mate =

History of the South American drink

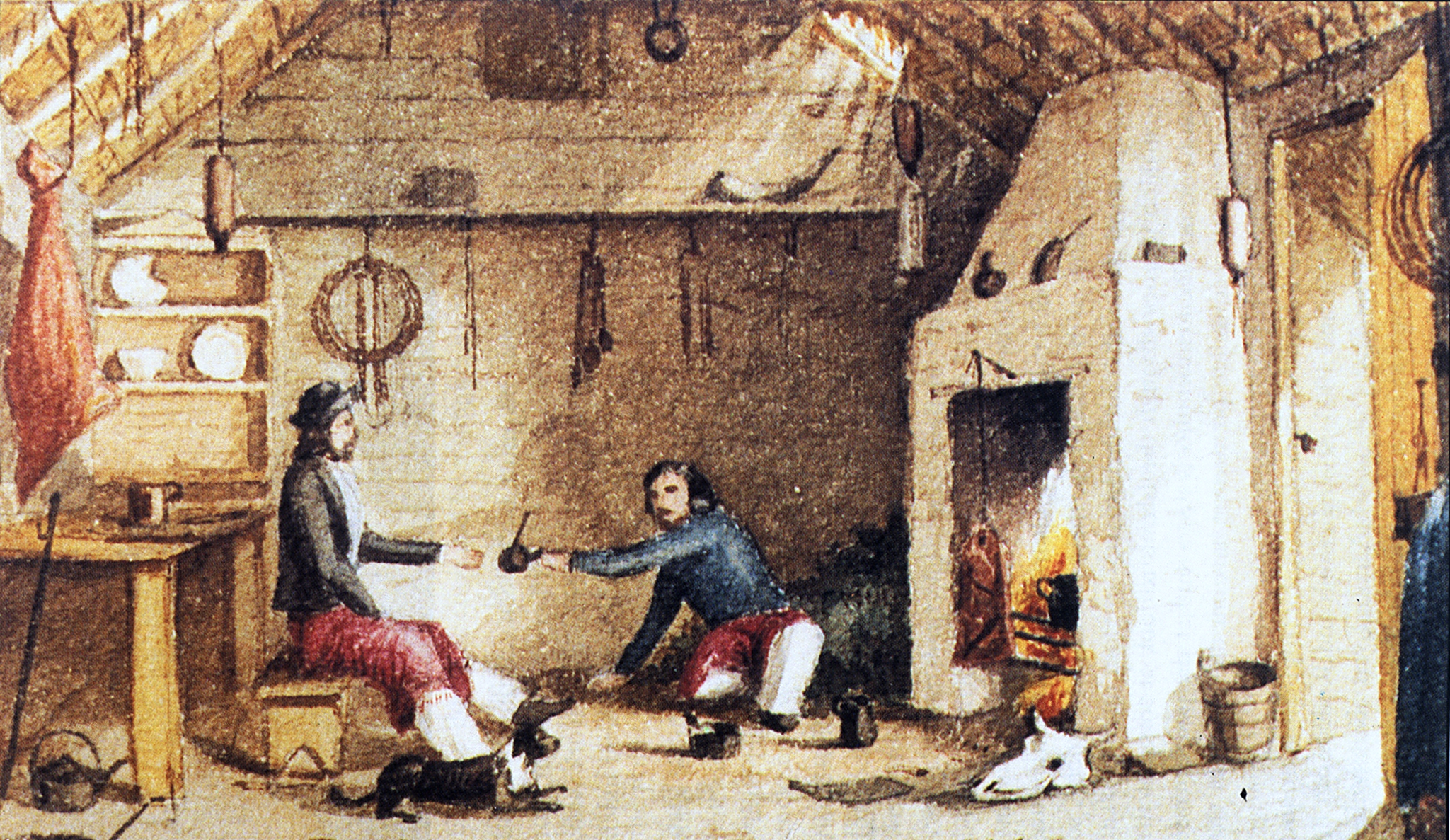
Falkland gauchos having mate at Hope Place. 1850s watercolour by William Pownell Dale.

The history of yerba mate stretches back to pre-Columbian Paraguay. It is marked by a rapid expansion in harvest and consumption in the Spanish South American colonies but also by its difficult domestication process that began in the mid 17th century and again later when production was industrialized around 1900.

The consumption of yerba mate became widespread in the Spanish colony of Paraguay in the late 16th century both among Spanish settlers and indigenous Guaraní people, who had to some extent consumed it before the Spanish arrival. Mate consumption spread in the 17th century to the Platine region and from there to Chile and Peru. This widespread consumption turned it into Paraguay's main commodity above other wares like tobacco, and Indian labour was used to harvest wild stands. In the mid 17th century Jesuits managed to domesticate the plant and establish plantations in their Indian reductions in Misiones, sparking severe competition with the Paraguayan harvesters of wild stands. After the expulsion of the Jesuits in the 1770s their plantations fell into decay as did their domestication secrets. The industry continued to be of prime importance for the Paraguayan economy after independence, but development in benefit of the Paraguayan state halted after the Paraguayan War (1864–1870) which devastated the country both economically and demographically. Brazil then became the prime producer of yerba mate. In Brazilian and Argentine projects in late 19th and early 20th century, the plant was domesticated once again opening the way for modern plantation systems. When Brazilian entrepreneurs turned their attention to coffee in the 1930s Argentina, which had long been the prime consumer, took over as the largest producer, resurrecting Misiones Province where the Jesuits had once had most of their plantations. However, the coffee production regions in Brazil are distinct from the mate plantations. According to FAO in 2012, Brazil is the biggest producer of mate in the world with 513,256 MT (58%), followed by Argentina with 290,000 MT (32%) and Paraguay with 85,490 MT (10%).

== Early use ==
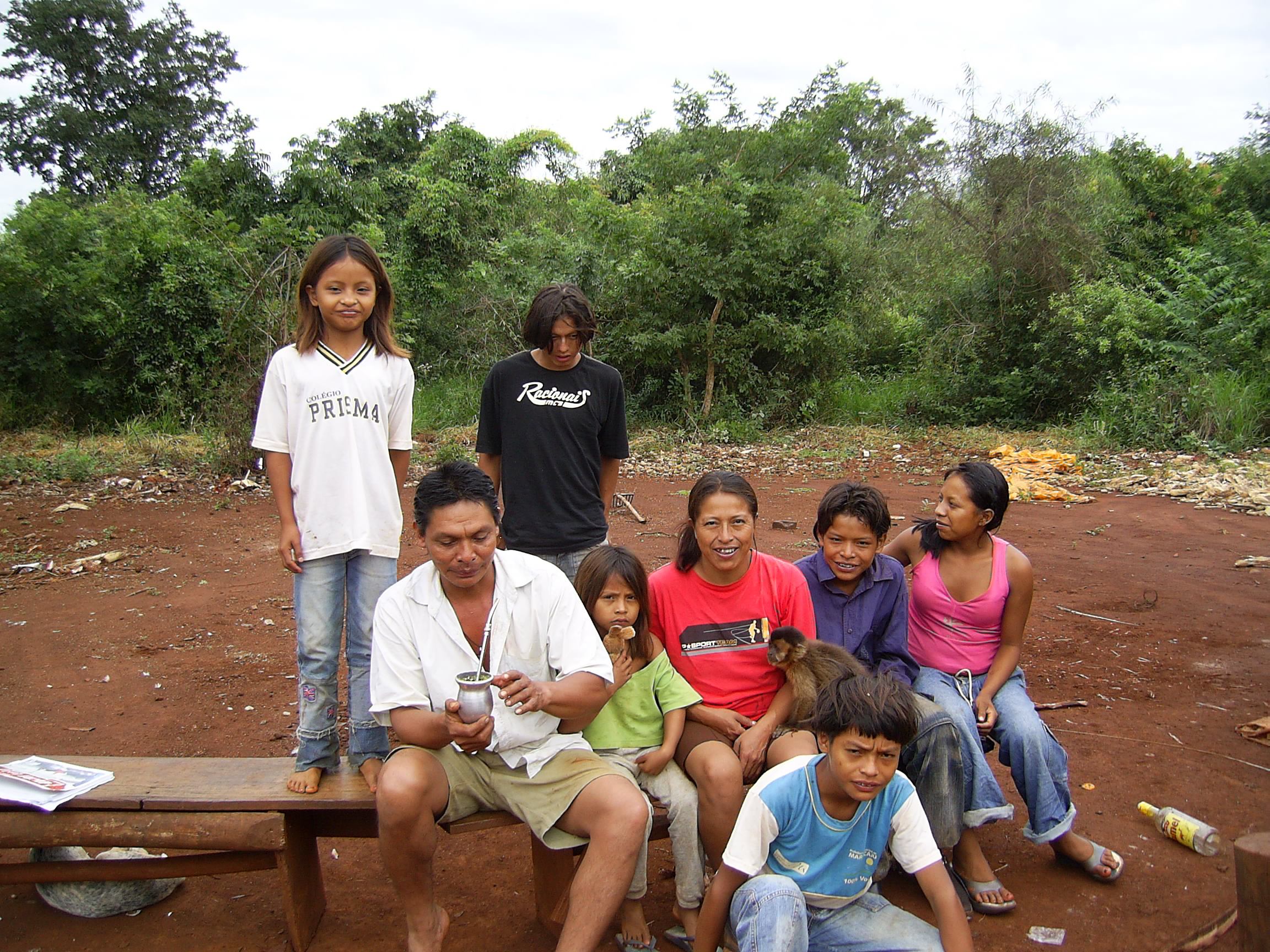
Indigenous Guaraní (in picture) are known to have consumed yerba mate before the Spanish conquest of Paraguay.

Before the arrival of the Spanish, the Guaraní people, indigenous to the area of natural distribution of the plant, are known to have consumed yerba mate at least for medicinal purposes. Remnants of yerba mate have also been found in a Quechua tomb near Lima, Peru and has therefore been suggested to have been associated with prestige. The first Europeans to establish themselves in the lands of the Guaranís and the yerba mate were the Spaniards that founded Asunción in 1537. The new colony developed with little commerce and contact from outside and which caused the Spanish to establish fuller contacts beyond labour relationships with the local tribes. It is not clear exactly when Spaniards began to drink mate but it is known by late 16th century to be widely consumed.

By 1596 the consumption of mate as a beverage had become so common in Paraguay that a member of the cabildo of Asunción wrote to governor of Río de la Plata Hernando Arias de Saavedra:

"the vice and bad habit of drinking yerba has spread so much among the Spaniards, their women and children, that unlike the Indians that are content to drink it once a day they drink it continuously and those who do not drink it are very rare."

The same author of the letter went on to claim that Spanish settlers sold their clothing, weapons and horses or fell into debt to obtain yerba mate.

== Spread across South America (1600–1650) ==
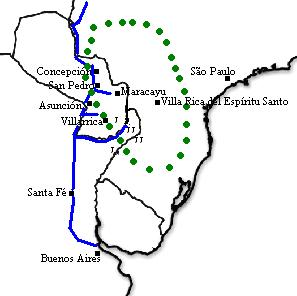
Map showing natural distribution area of yerba mate as well as important colonial settlements and the principal water ways: areas with Jesuit missions are marked with "J". The borders are those of the modern countries.

In early 17th century, yerba mate had become the chief export of the Guaraní territories, above sugar, wine and tobacco, which had previously dominated. The Governor of Río de la Plata, Hernando Arias de Saavedra, turned in the beginning of the 17th century against the burgeoning mate industry due to beliefs that it was an unhealthy bad habit and that too much of the Indian workforce was consumed in it. He ordered to end the production in the governorate and at the same time sought approval from the Spanish Crown, which rejected the ban, as did also the people involved in production who never complied with the order. In contrast to other alkaloid rich cash crops found by Europeans in the Age of Discovery like cocoa and coffee, yerba mate was not a domesticated species and came to be exploited from wild stands long into the 19th century, although the Jesuits domesticated it first in the mid 17th century.

Up to 1676, during the rise of the industry, the main production centre of yerba mate was the Indian town of Maracayú northeast of Asunción. In Maracayú, amid forests rich in yerba mate, settlers from Asunción dominated production. Maracayú came however to be the place of long-standing conflict when settlers from the towns of Villa Rica del Espíritu Santo and Ciudad Real del Guayrá begun to move into the Maracayú area that the old settlers regarded as theirs. In the 1630 the conflict escalated when settlers from Villa Rica and Ciudad Real del Guayrá and the Jesuit missions of Guairá had to flee over to the Maracayú area due to attacks from Portuguese settlers from São Paulo. In the Maracayú area the new settlers made mate their main income source sparking a conflict with the settlers of Asunción which only ended in 1676 when the Portuguese settlers made another push making Maracayú a rather exposed borderland zone. The settlers of Maracaýu relocated to the south forming the modern city of Villarrica and transformed their new lands into the new centre of the mate industry.

The conflict between the old and the new settlers in Maracayú coincided with the spread of consumption of mate beyond the colony of Paraguay, first to the trade hub of Río de la Plata and from there to Upper Peru (Bolivia), Lower Peru, Ecuador and Chile, becoming an important commodity in many cities of colonial South America. Guaraní serving in the Army of Arauco may have also had a role in popularising the drink in southern Chile not long after this army was formed in 1604. Regarding Chile there are also accounts of yerba mate being introduced to Santiago a few years or decades after its founding in 1542. Once trade networks were established mate arrived overland to Chile and from Valparaíso small quantities were exported north to the ports of El Callao, Guayaquil and Panama. During the course of the 17th century, taxes on mate became an important revenue source in Paraguay, Santa Fé and Buenos Aires and became heavily taxed: Some of the taxes applied were the tithe, alcabala and municipal taxes through the cities where it passed. In 1680 the Spanish Crown imposed a special tax on yerba mate aimed to finance Buenos Aires defence works and garrison.

The shift southward to Villarrica of the production led Asunción to lose position as the sole hub of export downstream to Santa Fe and Buenos Aires. When production was centred in Maracayú transport down Paraná River was difficult and therefore the yerba was bought through Jejuy River to Asunción on Paraguay River which was navigable all the way down to Río de la Plata. The local government of Asunción tried unsuccessfully to have all mate produced north of Tebicuary River to pass through the city, but the Villarrica settlers, as well as the Spanish Crown, largely ignored the complaints of the Asunción government.

== Jesuit era and domestication (1650–1767) ==
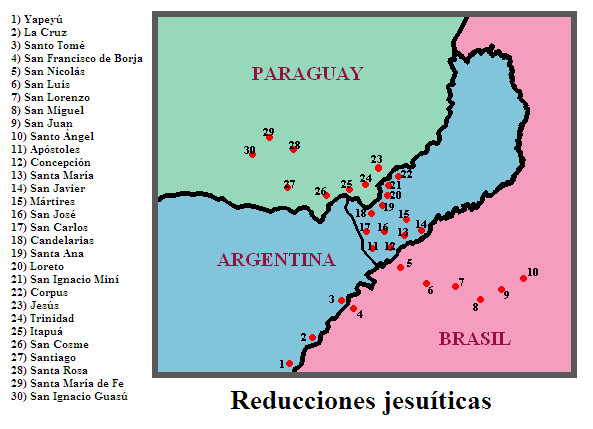
Location of the most important Jesuit reductions in Argentina, Brazil and Paraguay, with present political divisions

The Jesuits began in the late 16th century to establish a series of reduction settlements in the lands of the Guaraní people to convert them to Catholicism. The Jesuit missions had a high degree of autarky but needed coins to pay taxes and acquire products they could not produce. While in the early 17th century Jesuits had supported governor Hernando Arias de Saavedra's ban on yerba mate production, they became by mid-17th century severe competitors to the harvesters of the land north of Tebicuary River who had had a practical monopoly on the product. In 1645 the Jesuits had successfully requested the Spanish Crown to be allowed to produce and export yerba mate. The Jesuits initially followed the normal production procedure by sending thousands of Guaranís out into long journeys to the swamps where the best trees grew to harvest naturally occurring stands, where many Indians fell ill or died. From the 1650s to the 1670s the Jesuits succeeded in domesticating the plant, something that contemporaries had found extremely difficult. The Jesuits kept the domestication a secret. It apparently involved feeding the seed to birds or emulating the passing of the seeds through the digestive system of a bird. The Jesuits gained a series of commercial advantages over their competitors in the Tebacuary region. Apart from their successful domestication and establishment of plantations, their missions were closer to the important trade hubs of Santa Fé and Buenos Aires and they succeeded in obtaining exemptions from the tithe, alcabala, and the additional tax established in 1680. These privileges caused a conflict with the Paraguayan cities of Asunción and Villarrica that accused the Jesuits of flooding the Platine market with cheap yerba mate, and led to the imposition of limits for the Jesuit exports, which they nevertheless exceeded, so that at the time of the expulsion of the Order they exported four times the amount they were legally allowed. The Jesuits did not, officially, sell mate for profit beyond covering basic necessities and taxes, and accused the Paraguayans of causing prices to drop, adding that their yerba mate was preferred by merchants not due to its price but due to its better quality.

Due to the shortage of coins, yerba mate was used as a currency in the Jesuit reductions, along with honey, maize, and tobacco.

== Expansion (1767–1870) ==
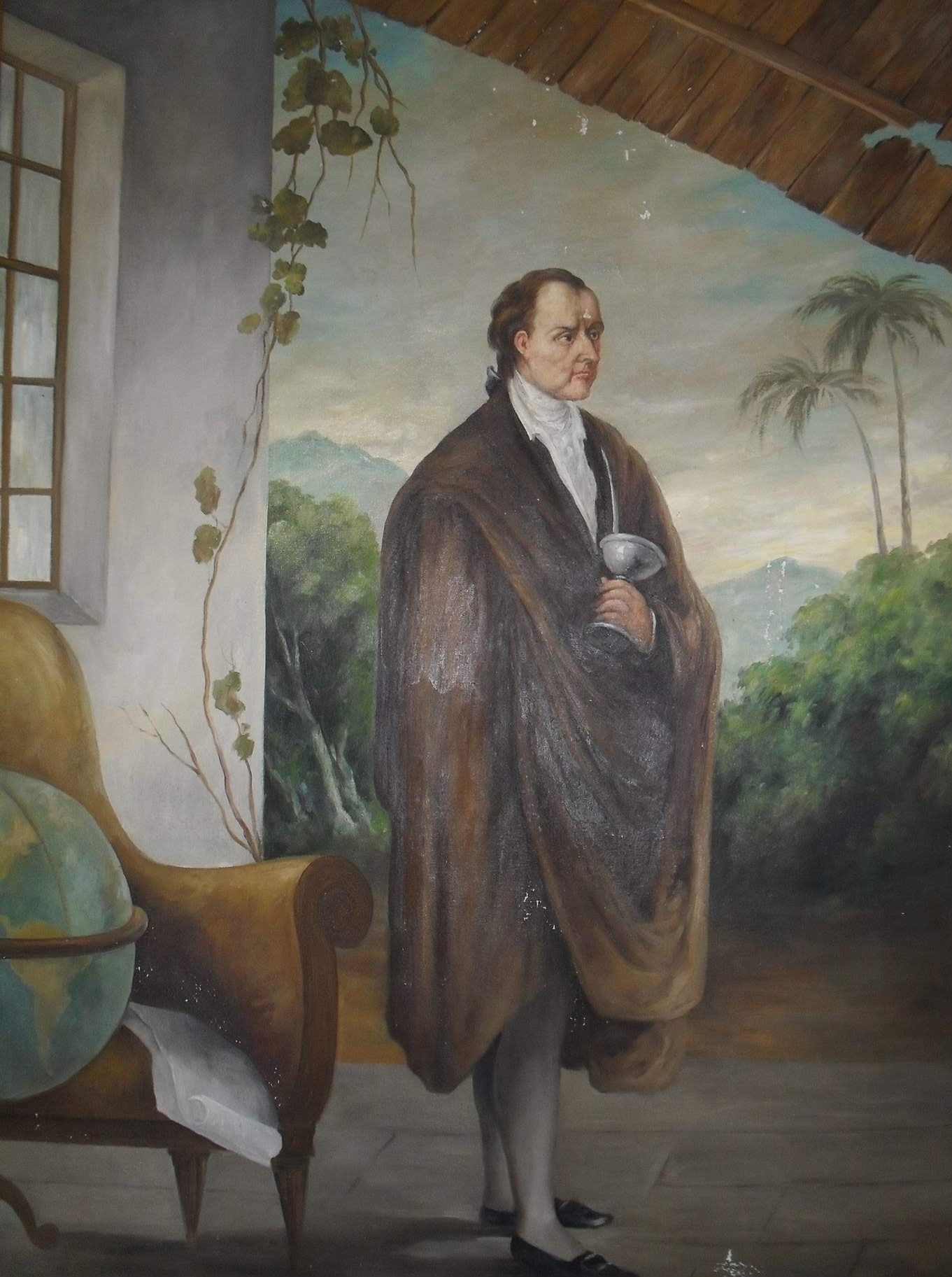
Lithograph of José Gaspar Rodríguez de Francia, a 19th-century ruler of Paraguay, with a mate and bombilla

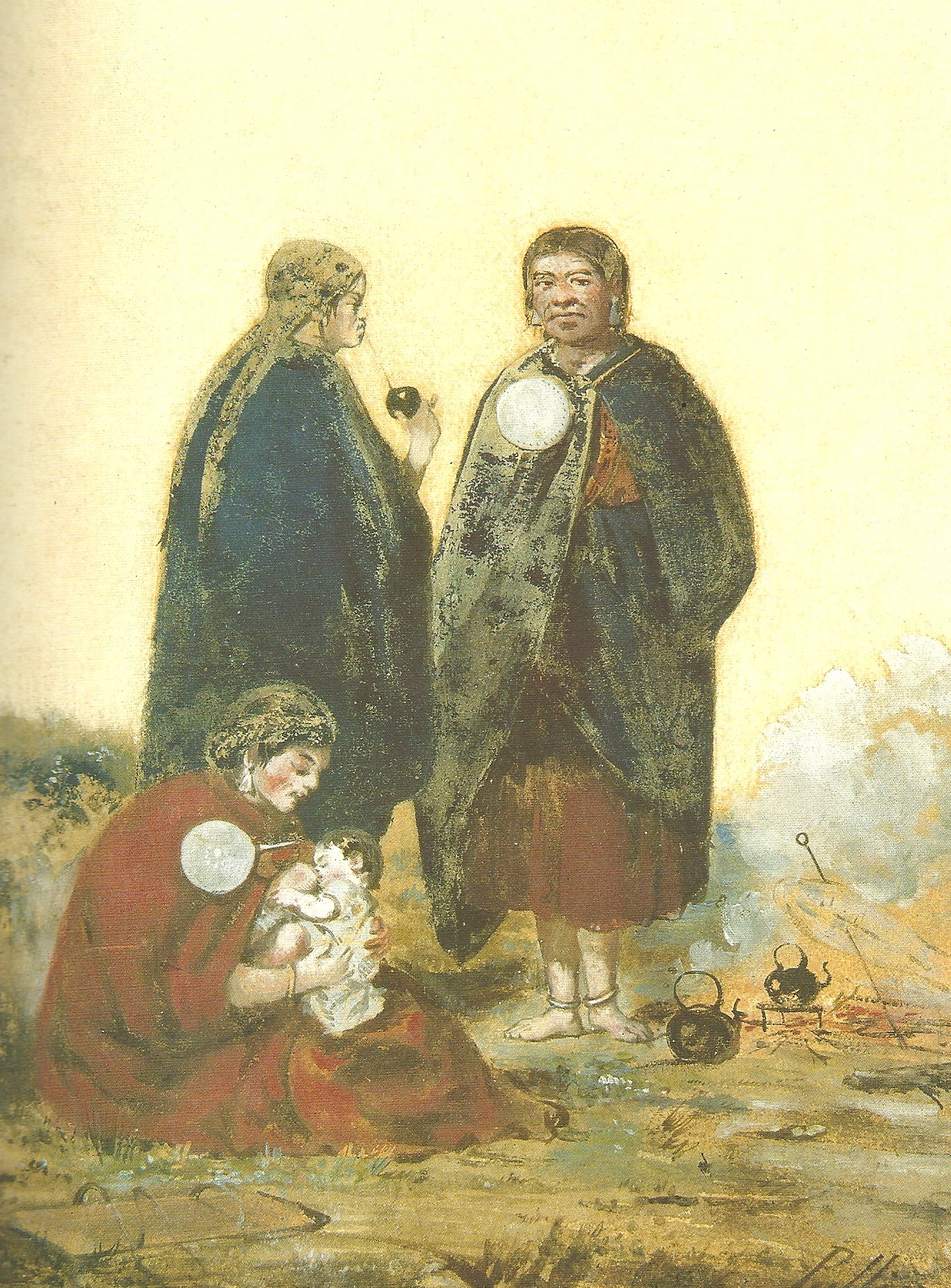
19th-century Mapuche women of the Argentine Pampas drinking mate

After the suppression of the Society of Jesus in 1767 the production and importance of mate-producing regions which had been dominated by Jesuits began to decline. Excessive exploitation of Indian labour in the plantations led to decay in the industry and the scattering of Guaranís living in the missions. With the fall of the Jesuits and the mismanagement by the crown and the new entrepreneurs that had taken over Jesuit plantations Paraguay gained an unrivalled position as the main producer of yerba mate. The plantation system of the Jesuits did however not prevail and mate continued chiefly to be harvested from wild stand through the 18th and most of the 19th century. Concepción in Paraguay, founded in 1773, became a major port of export since it had a huge hinterland of untouched stands of yerba mate north of it. As part of the Bourbon Reforms free trade within the Spanish Empire was allowed in 1778. This and a tax reform in 1780 lead to increased trade in Spanish South America which benefited the mate industry. In the 1770s the habit of drinking mate reached as far as Cuenca, in present-day Ecuador.

During the colonial period in Europe, mate failed to be accepted like cocoa, tea and coffee. In 1774 the Jesuit José Sánchez Labrador wrote that mate was consumed by "many" in Portugal and Spain and that many in Italy approved of it. In the 19th-century, yerba mate attracted the attention of the French naturalists Aimé Bonpland and Augustin Saint-Hilaire who, separately, studied the plant. In 1819 the latter gave yerba mate its binomial nomenclature: Ilex paraguariensis.

Expensive mate cups made of silver in colonial South America were made chiefly by Criollo silversmiths as this occupation was reserved for those who qualified according to the Limpieza de sangre. This was then reflected in styles as the bulk of these mate cups of silver followed European fashionable styles such as Baroque and Neoclassicism.

After independence, Paraguay was to lose its pre-eminence as top producer to Brazil and Argentina, although Argentina went into a mate crisis. At independence, Argentina inherited both the largest mate-consuming population in the world as well as Misiones Province where most of the Jesuit missions had been and where the industry was in decay. The decline of production in Argentina relative to the constant increase in demand lead Argentina in the mid-19th century to depend heavily on its neighbors for supply. Yerba mate came to be imported to Argentina from the Paraná highlands in Brazil. This yerba mate was labelled Paranaguá after its shipping port.

In Paraguay, yerba mate continued to be a major cash crop after independence but the foci of industry shifted away from the mixed plantations and wild stands of Villarrica, north to Concepción in late colonial times and then by 1863 to San Pedro. During the rule of Carlos Antonio López (1844–1862), the yerba mate business was managed by the military commanders of the district, who could harvest yerba mate as a state enterprise or give concessions. The onset of the Paraguayan War (1864–1870) caused a sharp drop in the harvesting of yerba mate in Paraguay, estimated at 95% between 1865 and 1867, caused by enrolment. It has been reported that during the war soldiers from all sides consumed yerba mate to calm the hunger and the combat anxiety. After the Paraguayan War against Brazil, Argentina and Uruguay, Paraguay was demographically as well as economically ruined and foreign entrepreneurs came to control the yerba mate production and industry in Paraguay. The 156.415 km^{2} lost by Paraguay in the war to Argentina and Brazil were mostly rich in yerba mate production.

In Chile, where the habit of drinking mate had taken firm ground during colonial times, its popularity gave slowly way after independence to drinks popular in Europe, coffee and tea that entered the country through its increasingly busy ports. The spread of tea and coffee consumption in Chile, to the detriment of mate, began in the upper classes. The first coffee shop in Chile appeared in Santiago in 1808. German botanist Eduard Friedrich Poeppig described in 1827 a wealthy family in Chile where the old people drank yerba mate with bombilla while the younger preferred Chinese tea. The trend of decreasing mate consumption was noticed in 1875 by the British consul Rumbold who said that "imports of Paraguayan tea" were "steadily falling off". Yerba mate was overall cheaper (price per kilo from 1871 to 1930) than tea and coffee and it remained popular in rural areas of Chile. Despite a relative decline the social importance of mate was enough in the port city of Coquimbo for a stylistically distinct type of mate cup known as mate coquimbano to emerge in the early 19th century. Aspects of the Mate coquimbano style were diffused in the neighboring Andean region of Argentina. Yerba mate was widely consumed among in the cold and montanious areas of Chile, as well as in the south of the country. Indeed, yerba mate was one of the basic supplies to be found in the mountain shelters established in the 1760s as part of the Trans-Andean postal system.

== Industrialization and spread to the Levant (1870–1950) ==
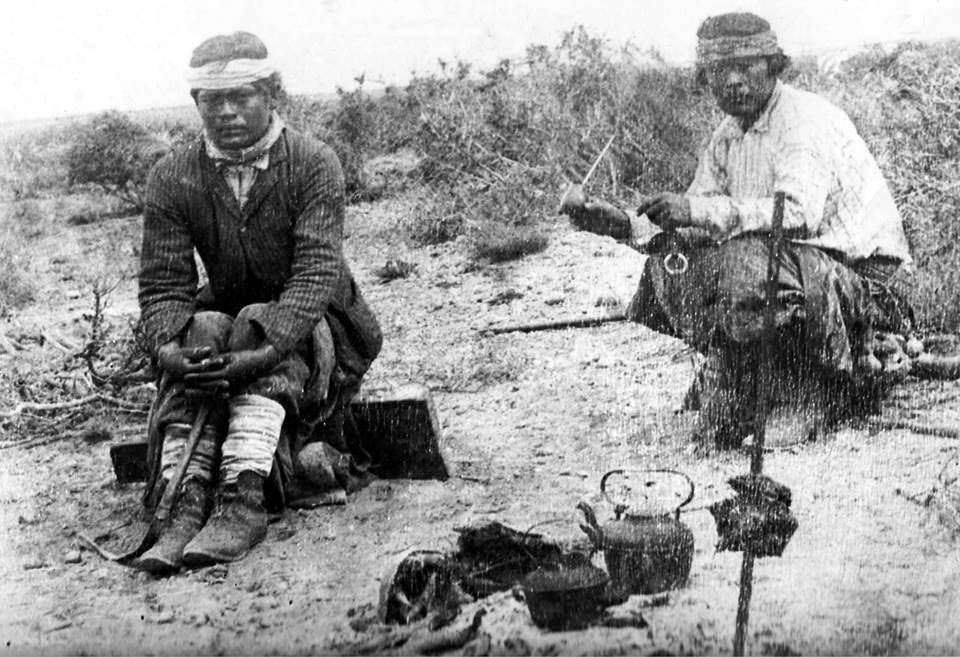
Tehuelches of Patagonia drinking mate while the meat of the asado is roasting, 1895

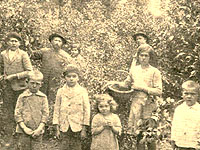
Ukrainian immigrants harvest yerba mate in 1920. Despite its relative inhospitality, Misiones attracted considerable European immigration.

With the devastation of Paraguay and insignificant Argentine production, by the end of the 19th century, Brazil became the leading producer of yerba mate. In the 1890s yerba mate plantations regained prominence in the markets when plantations began to be developed in Mato Grosso do Sul.

In the early 20th century Argentine production began to recover, rising from less than 1 million kg in 1898 to 20 million kg in 1929 in Misiones Province alone. In the first half of the 20th century Argentina ran a state programme to populate Misiones Province and kick-start a mate industry. Family-sized parcels of land in Misiones were given to foreign settlers, most of them from Central and Eastern Europe. In the 1930s Brazil changed from mate to coffee production, as it gave more income, leaving the resurrected Argentine industry as the biggest producer, which benefited the Argentine economy as it was also the largest consumer of mate.

Syrian and Lebanese immigrants to Argentina spread the habit of drinking mate to their homelands, where it became particularly associated with the Druze.
