= Achao =

Coordinates: 42°28′S 73°31′W

Achao Villa de Santa María de Achao
- City
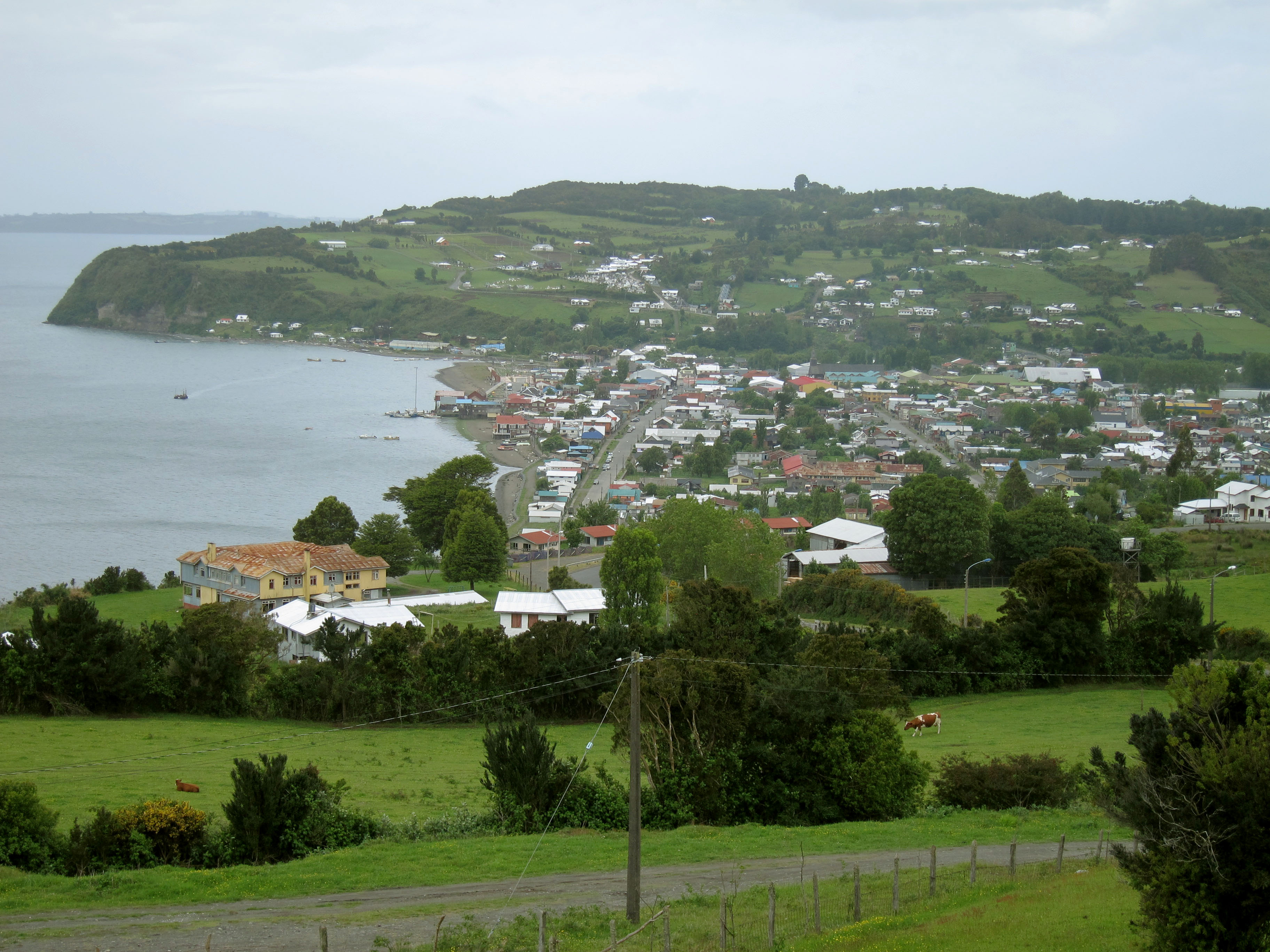
- Panoramic view of Achao from Alto La Paloma lookout in 2011.

- Country: Chile
- Region: Los Lagos
- Province: Chiloé
- Founded as: Villa de Santa María de Achao
- Founded: 1753

Population (2005)
  - Total: 3,452
- Demonym: Achaino/a
- Time zone: UTC−4 (CLT)
  - Summer (DST): UTC−3 (CLST)

Achao is a town on the Chiloé Archipelago, in the south of Chile. The town is the capital of Quinchao commune on the island of the same name.

Lying on level ground, Achao has a shallow sandy beach and is surrounded by hills. Opposite the town are the islands of Llingua and Linlín. The surrounding hills have a number of lookouts, such as the Alto de la Paloma lookout.

Achao is the main Chiloé town off the main island of Chiloé and is therefore frequented by inhabitants of the smaller islands making up the archipelago, who go to Achao for school or commercial activities.

In the summer, Achao is host to the Chiloé folklore festival (Encuentro de las Islas del Archipiélago), celebrating traditional culture on the Chiloé archipelago with customs, music and food.

The architecture in Achao is known for the wide variety of larch tiling used on the roofs of its houses.

== Church of Achao ==
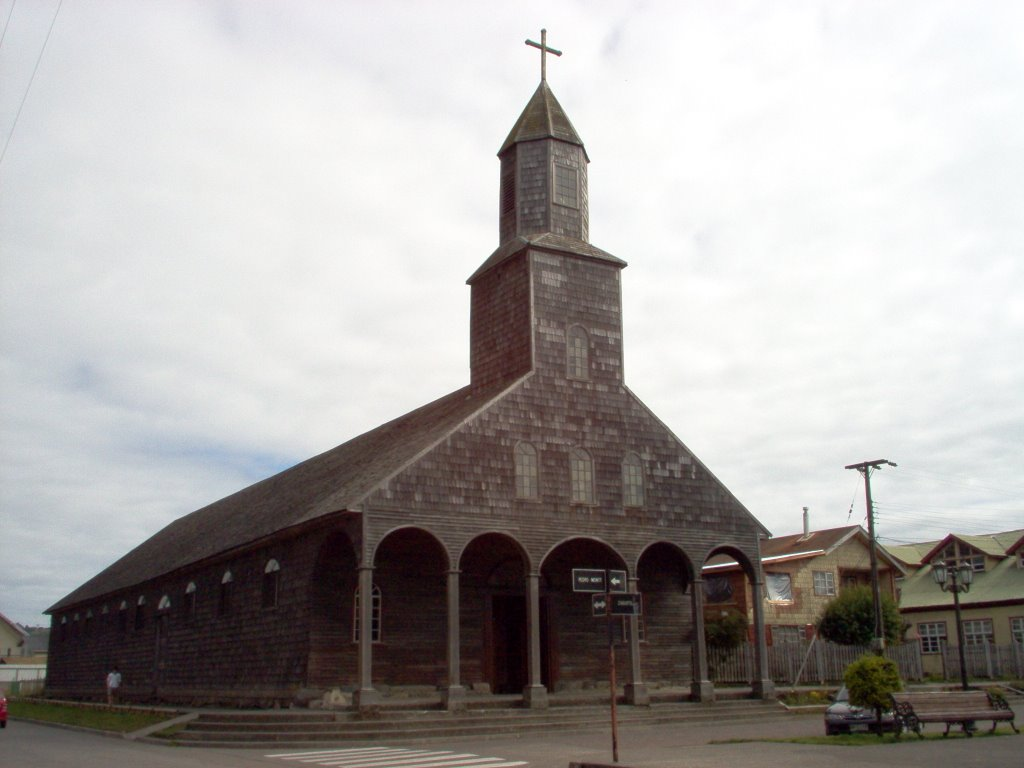
Church of Santa María de Loreto, Achao, built in the 18th century.

In front of the Achao plaza is the Church of Santa María de Loreto, Achao —Spanish: Iglesia de Santa María de Loreto de Achao— one of the 16 Churches of Chiloé that were declared Chilean National Monuments in 1979 and UNESCO World Heritage Sites on 30 November 2000. The Church of Achao is the oldest wooden church in Chile, and this church and the Church of Quinchao are the only churches that remain of those built by the Jesuits. Construction began around 1740 when the Chiloé Archipelago was still a part of the Spanish Crown possessions, and was completed in 1770 by Franciscan missionaries from Santa Rosa de Ocopa school in Peru following the expulsion of the Jesuits in 1767.

The church forms a part of the Diocese of Ancud.

== See also ==
- Church of Santa María de Loreto, Achao
- Quinchao Island
