= Church of Santa María de Loreto, Achao =

Church of Achao
UNESCO World Heritage Site
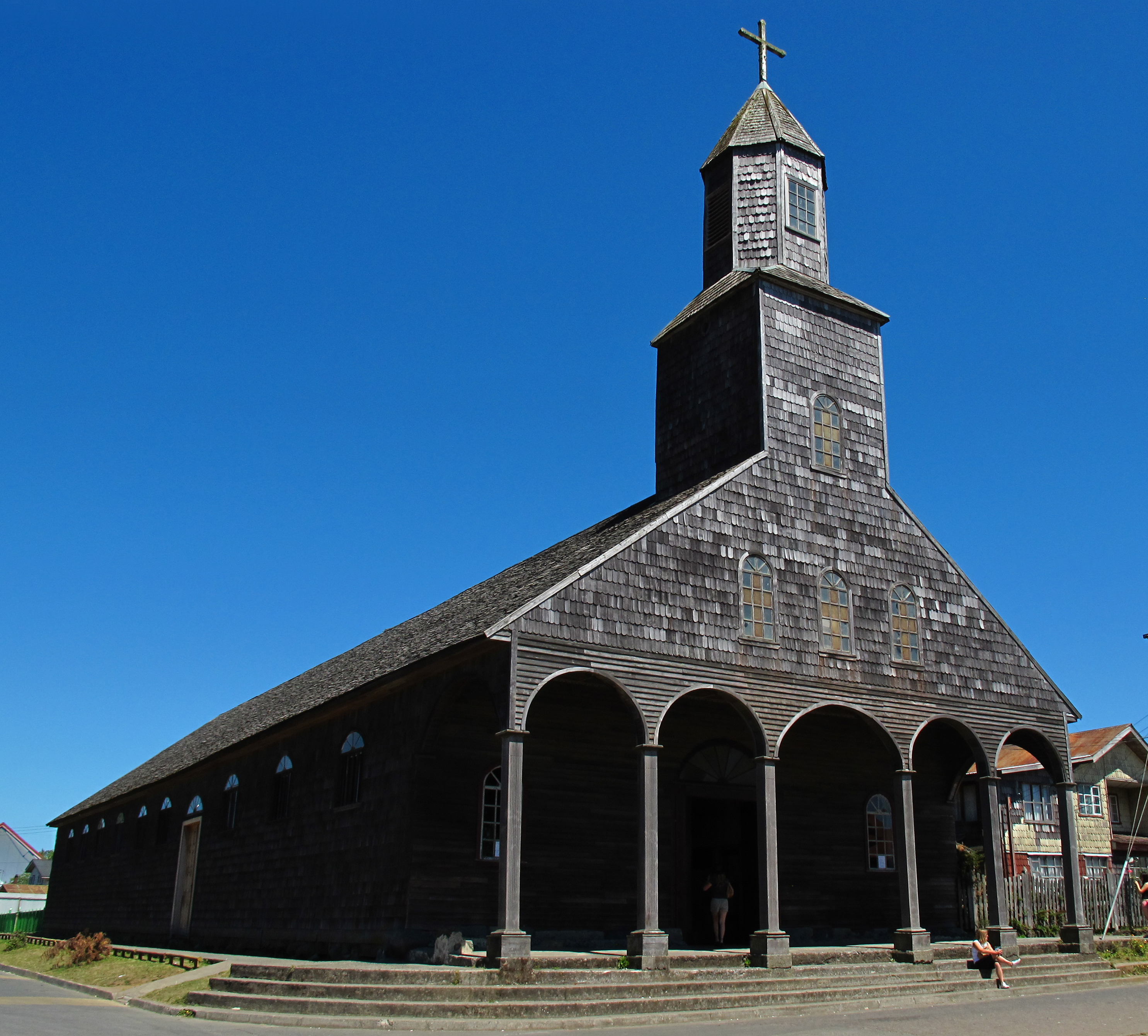
- Achao's Church facade

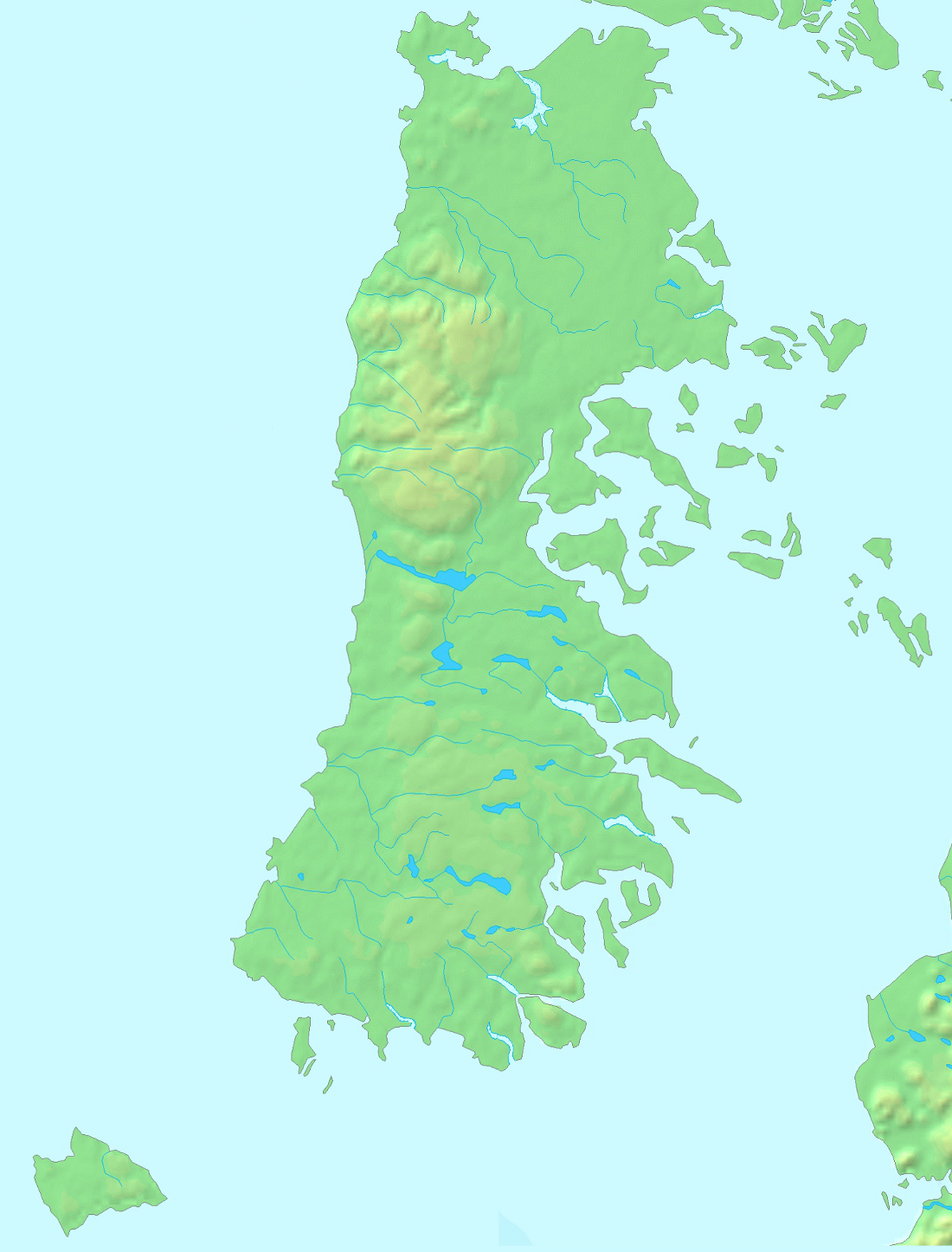
- Location within Chiloé Location within Los Lagos Location within Chile
- Location: Achao, Quinchao, Chiloé Province, Los Lagos Region, Chile
- Part of: Churches of Chiloé
- Criteria: Cultural: (ii), (iii)
- Reference: 971-001
- Inscription: 2000 (24th Session)
- Area: 0.165 ha (0.41 acres)
- Coordinates: 42°28′18″S 73°29′28″W

The Church of Santa María de Loreto de Achao (Spanish: Iglesia de Santa María de Loreto de Achao) is a Roman Catholic church located in Quinchao Island's largest town, Achao. Often referred to as the Church of Achao (Spanish: Iglesia de Achao), is within the Diocese of Ancud, and was built around 1740 when Chiloé Archipelago was still a part of the Spanish Crown possessions.

The Achao church is one of the oldest traditional Chiloé churches built in the 18th and 19th centuries, and survives almost intact from de Jesuit mission era. It belongs to a group of 16 iconic wooden churches that were declared as a UNESCO World Heritage Site under the Churches of Chiloé's denomination because of their unique form of wooden architecture known as the Chilota School of Religious Architecture on Wood.

== Gallery ==
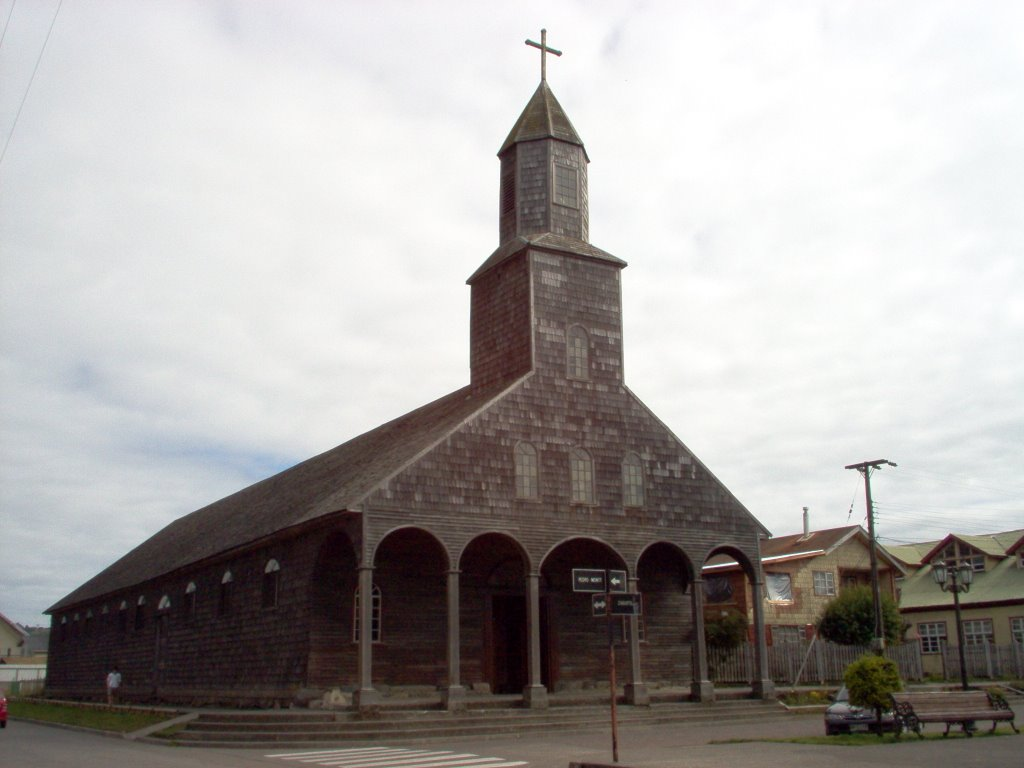
Iglesia de Achao

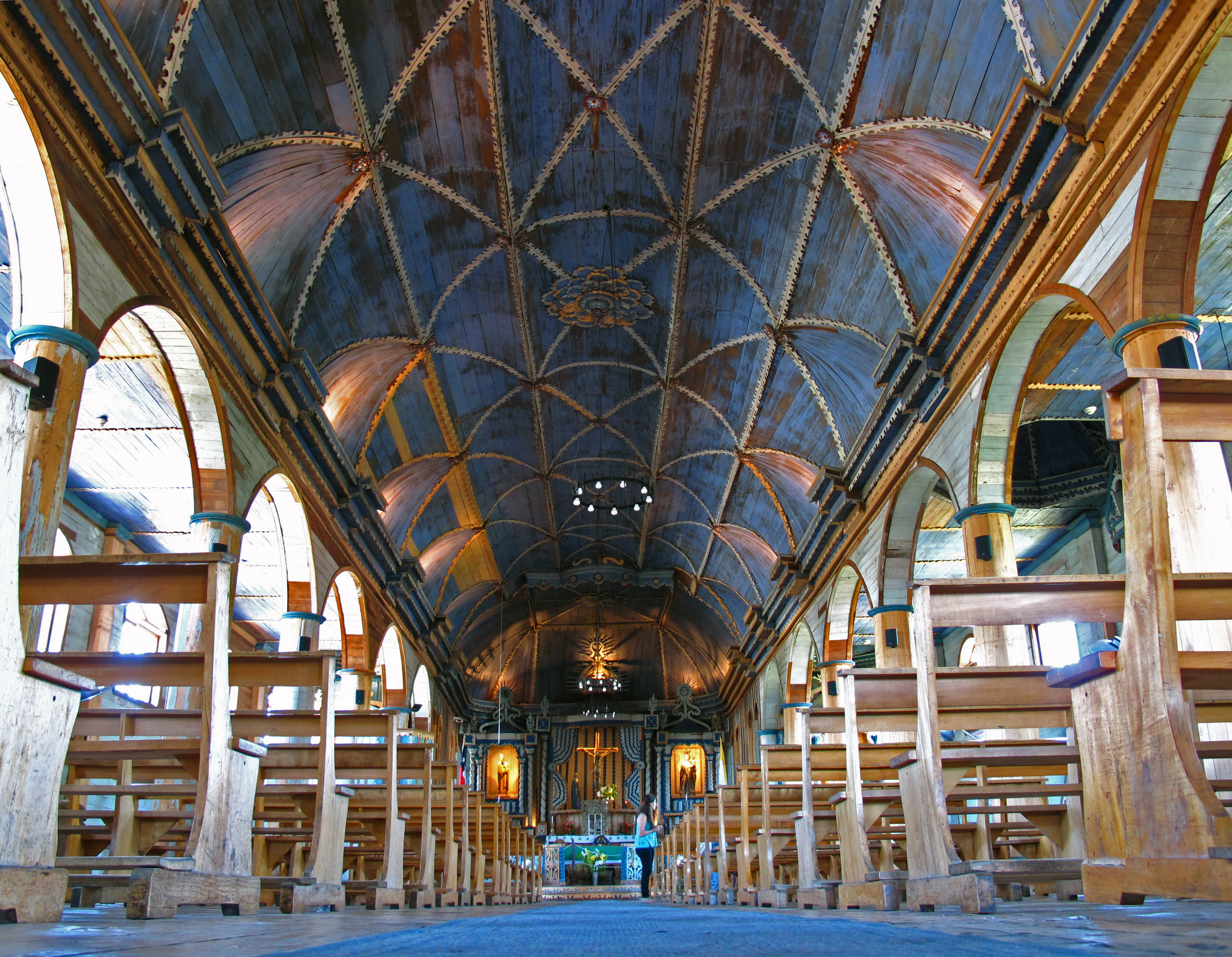
Achao church's nave

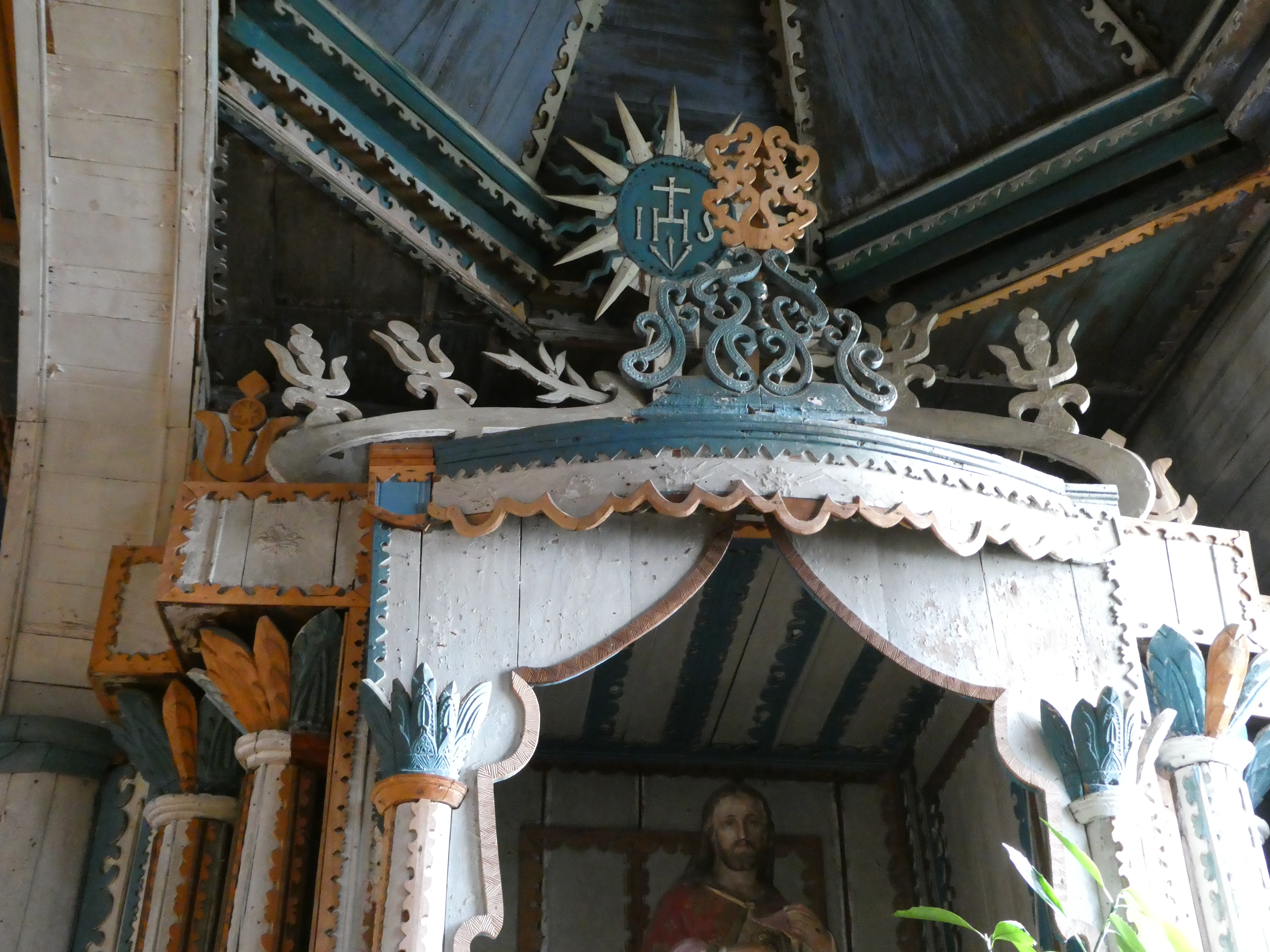
Jesuit symbol: IHS

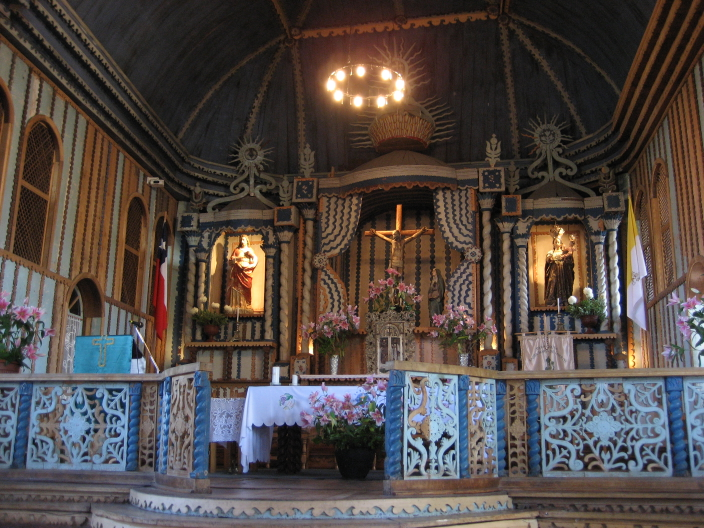
Achao church's interior

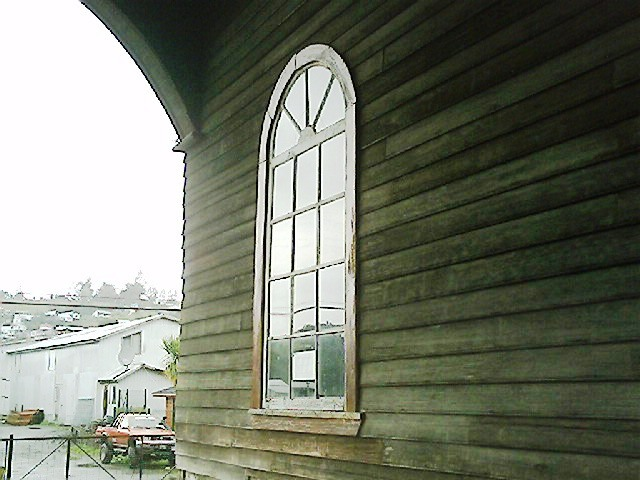
Achao church's window

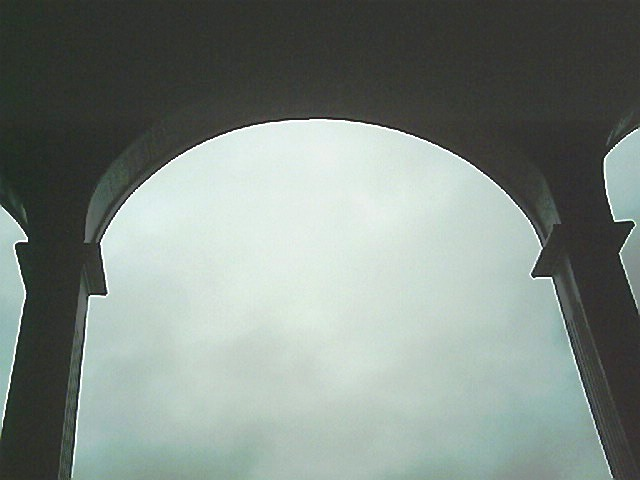
Central arc

== See also ==
- List of Jesuit sites
