= Church of Caguach =

UNESCO World Heritage Site
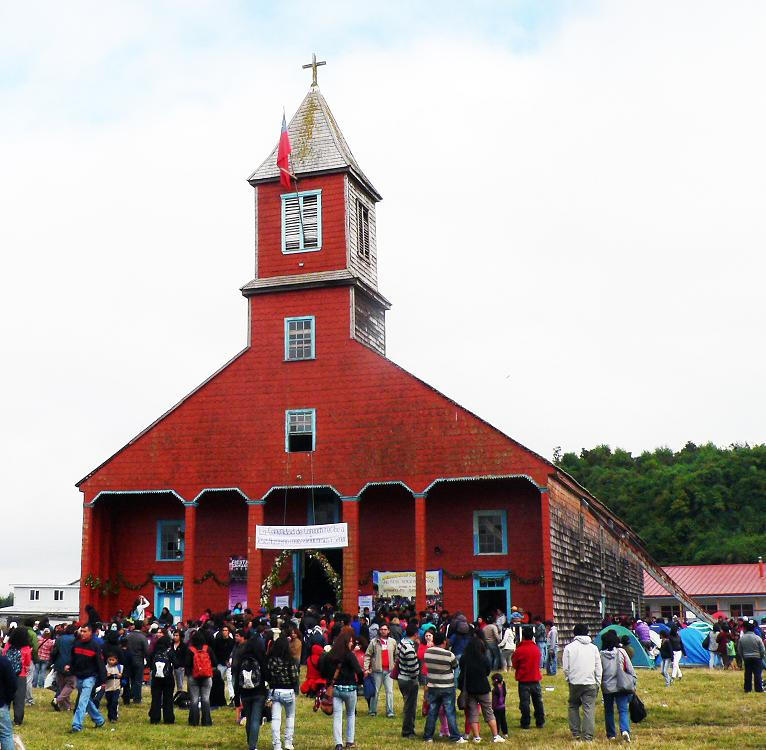
- Church facade

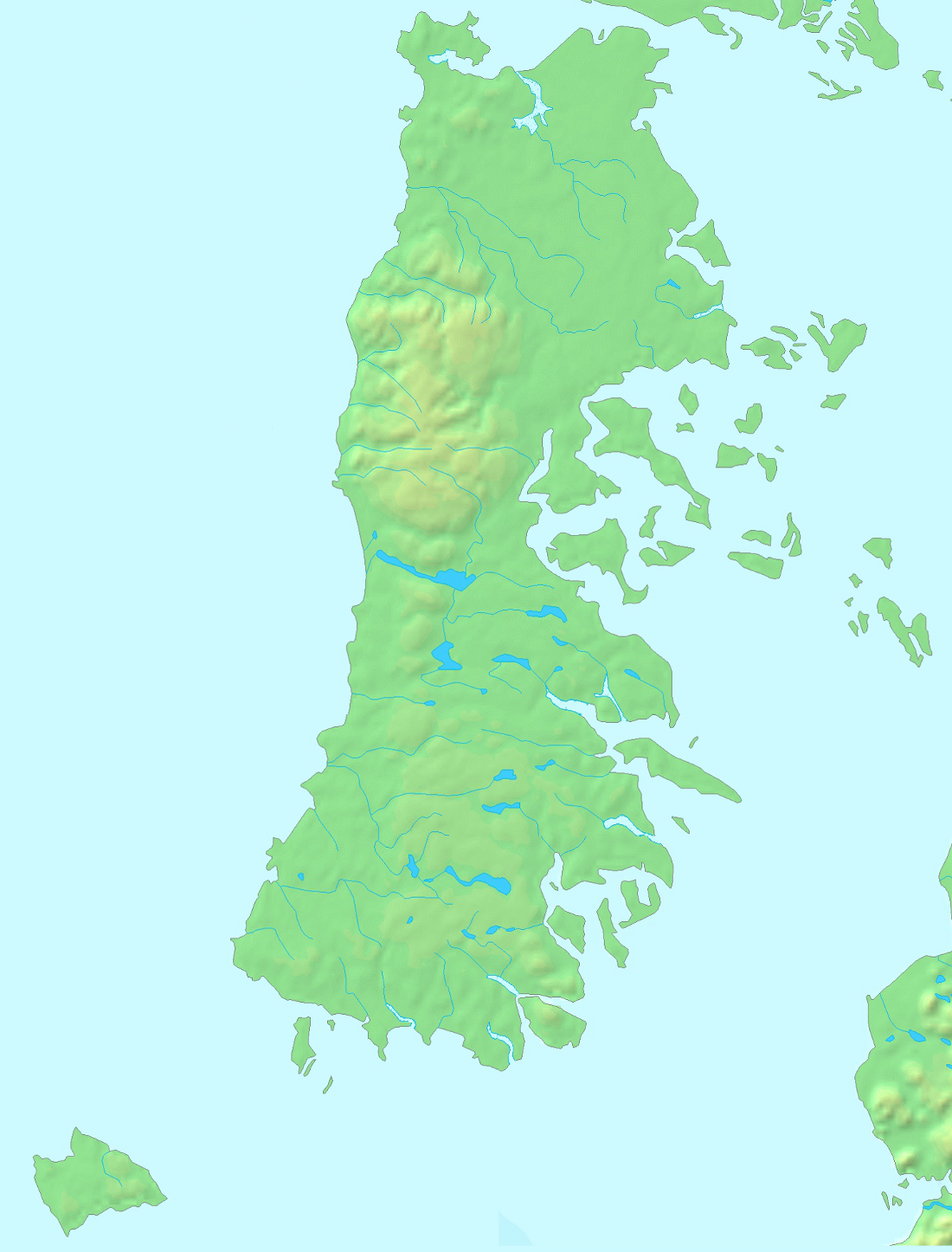
- Location within Chiloé Location within Los Lagos Location within Chile
- Location: Caguach, Quinchao, Chiloé Province, Los Lagos Region, Chile
- Part of: Churches of Chiloé
- Criteria: Cultural: (ii), (iii)
- Reference: 971-016
- Inscription: 2000 (24th Session)
- Coordinates: 42°30′37″S 73°15′58″W

The Iglesia de Caguach (English: Church of Caguach), also known as Iglesia Jesús Nazareno de Caguach (English: Jesus of Nazareth, Church of Caguach) is a Catholic church located on the island of Caguach, in the commune of Quinchao on the Chiloé Archipelago, Chile. The church itself is part of a bigger group of churches named the Churches of Chiloé.

Originally built in 1778, the church was burnt down in 1919. It was rebuilt in 1925 by communities from five villages that had signed an agreement. The church's patron is Jesus of Nazareth and celebrates the feast day on August 30 and on every third Sunday of January. The holiday is considered as the Chiloé Archipelago's most important holiday, with accompanying celebrations involving dancing and processions. The church was designated as a National Monument of Chile in 2000 and was declared a UNESCO World Heritage Site as part of the Churches of Chiloé in the same year.

== Description ==
The original church was built in 1778. In 1919, the original Church of Caguach was completely destroyed by a fire though its image was recovered. The church was rebuilt in 1925 by communities from five villages that had signed an agreement. This would be the third church built in Caguach, Quinchao.

The church's patron is Jesus of Nazareth, also the patron of the Church of Aldachildo, whose feast day is celebrated on August 30 and on every third Sunday of January. Its holiday was originally established in 1778 and encouraged by Spanish Franciscan missionary Fray Hilario Martínez, where it is considered as the Chiloé Archipelago's most important holiday. The feast day is accompanied by a celebration that mostly takes place at the church, which involve music, dancing and processions. Boats that travel to the island for the church's celebration are inspected by the Castro Port Authority of the Chilean Navy.

The church was designated as a National Monument of Chile in 2000. As part of the sixteen Churches of Chiloé, it was declared a UNESCO World Heritage Site on 30 November 2000.
