= Quinchao =

- Commune
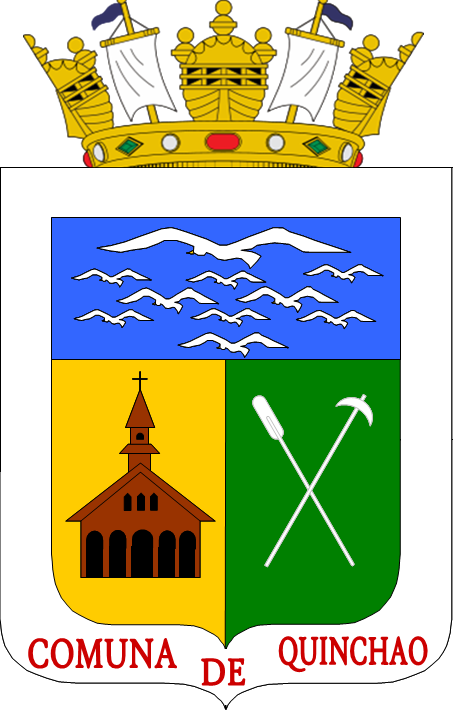
- Coat of arms Location of Quinchao in the Los Lagos Region Location in Chile
- Coordinates: 42°28′15″S 73°29′30″W
- Country: Chile
- Region: Los Lagos
- Province: Chiloé
- Seat: Achao

Government
  - Type: Municipality
  - Alcalde: René Garcés Álvarez (ILC)

Area
  - Total: 160.7 km^{2} (62.0 sq mi)
- Elevation: 4 m (13 ft)

Population (2012 Census)
  - Total: 7,965
  - Density: 49.56/km^{2} (128.4/sq mi)
  - Urban: 3,452
  - Rural: 5,524

Sex
  - Men: 4,417
  - Women: 4,559
- Time zone: UTC-4 (CLT)
  - Summer (DST): UTC-3 (CLST)
- Area code: (+56) 65
- Website: Municipality of Quinchao

Quinchao is a Chilean commune located in Chiloé Province, Los Lagos Region. The seat of government lies in the town of Achao on the island.

== Geography ==
The commune of Quinchao includes most of the Quinchao Island (sharing its territory with the commune of Curaco de Vélez), and it also incorporates nine nearby islands: Alao, Apia, Chaulinec and Cahuache (or Caguach), Lin-Lin, Llingua, Meulín, Quenac and Teuquelín. These islands all lie within the Gulf of Corcovado east of Chile's second largest island, Chiloé, which separates the Chiloé Archipelago from mainland Chile. The commune spans a total land area of 160.7 km^{2} (62 sq mi).

== Demographics ==
Historical population
Year	Pop.	±% p.a.
1875	10,542	—
1885	12,505	+1.72%
1895	13,851	+1.03%
1907	18,382	+2.39%
1920	16,850	−0.67%
1930	15,353	−0.93%
1940	16,885	+0.96%
1952	14,579	−1.22%
1970	8,339	−3.06%
1982	9,055	+0.69%
1992	9,088	+0.04%
2002	8,976	−0.12%
2017	8,088	−0.69%
2024	7,678	−0.74%
Source: "Censo de Población y Vivienda". National Statistics Institute.

According to the 2002 census of the National Statistics Institute, Quinchao has 8,976 inhabitants (4,417 men and 4,559 women). Of these, 3,452 (38.5%) lived in urban areas and 5,524 (61.5%) in rural areas. The population fell by 1.2% (112 persons) between the 1992 and 2002 censuses.

== Administration ==
The municipal building is the town of Achao. As a commune, Quinchao is a third-level administrative division of Chile administered by a municipal council, headed by an alcalde who is directly elected every four years. The 2008-2012 alcalde is Santiago Torres Águila (ILC).

Within the electoral divisions of Chile, Quinchao is represented in the Chamber of Deputies by Gabriel Ascencio (PDC) and Alejandro Santana (RN) as part of the 58th electoral district, together with Castro, Ancud, Quemchi, Dalcahue, Curaco de Vélez, Puqueldón, Chonchi, Queilén, Quellón, Chaitén, Hualaihué, Futaleufú and Palena. The commune is represented in the Senate by Camilo Escalona Medina (PS) and Carlos Kuschel Silva (RN) as part of the 17th senatorial constituency (Los Lagos Region).

== UNESCO sites ==
In 2000, UNESCO declared the 16 Churches of Chiloé to be World Heritage Sites, and the commune of Quinchao contains 3 such churches in the towns of Achao, Quinchao and on the island of Caguach.

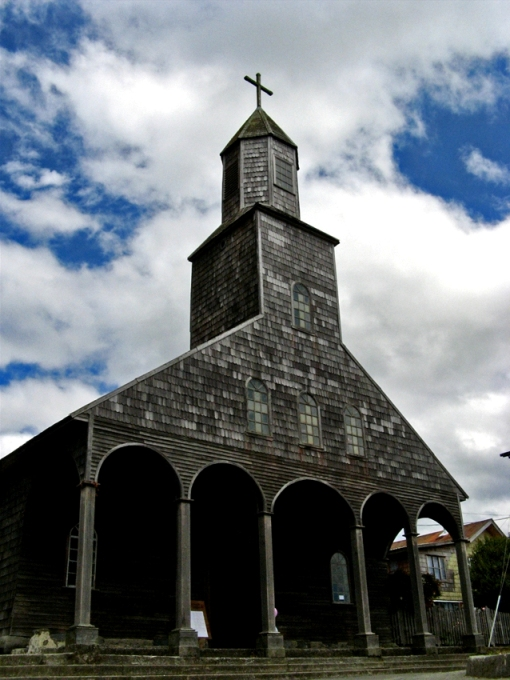
Saint Mary Church (Iglesia Santa María) in Achao

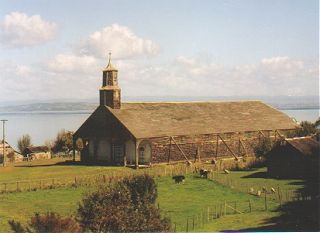
Church of Quinchao (Iglesia de Quinchao)
