= Quinchao Island =

Island in Chile

Native name: Isla Quinchao
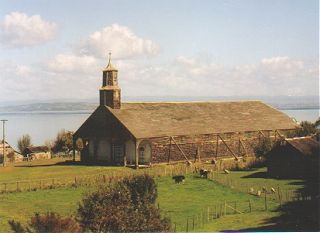
- Church of Quinchao

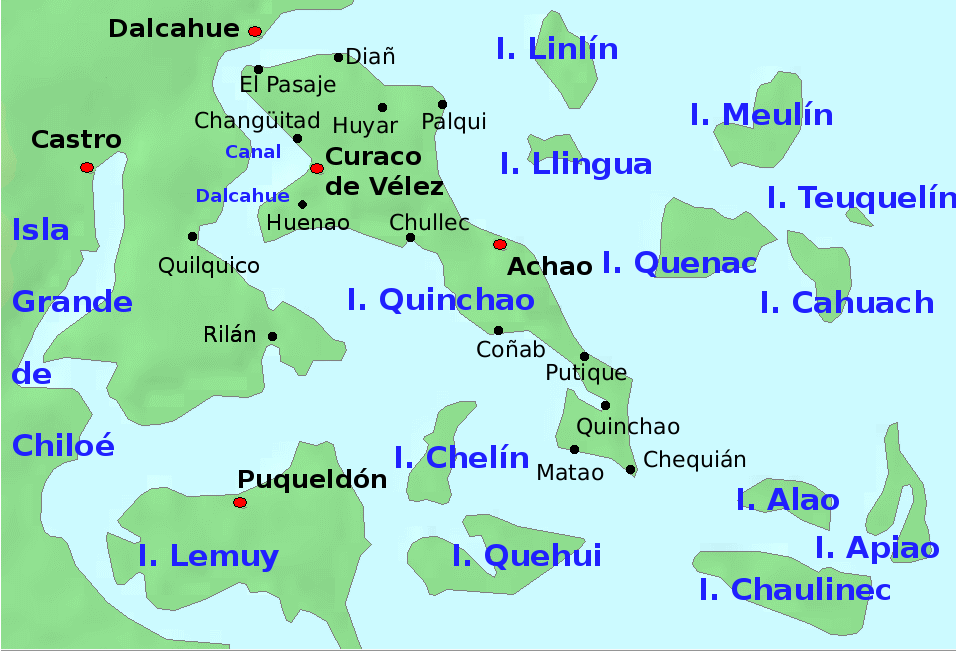
- Islands around Quinchao

Geography
- Coordinates: 42.483°S 73.483°W
- Adjacent to: Pacific Ocean
- Area: 135 km^{2} (52 sq mi)

Administration
- Chile
- Region: Los Ríos
- Province: Chiloé Province
- Commune: Quinchao, Curaco de Vélez

Demographics
- Population: 12,000

Additional information
- NGA UFI -898433

Quinchao Island is an island in Chiloé Province, Chile, off the east coast of Chiloé Island. It includes the communes of Quinchao and Curaco de Vélez. Main towns are Achao and Curaco de Vélez. Quinchao Island is separated from Chiloé Island by Dalcahue Channel in the northwest of the island. Both islands are part of the Chiloé Archipelago. Quinchao is the third largest island of the archipelago.
