= Central Range montane rain forests =

Ecoregion in New Guinea

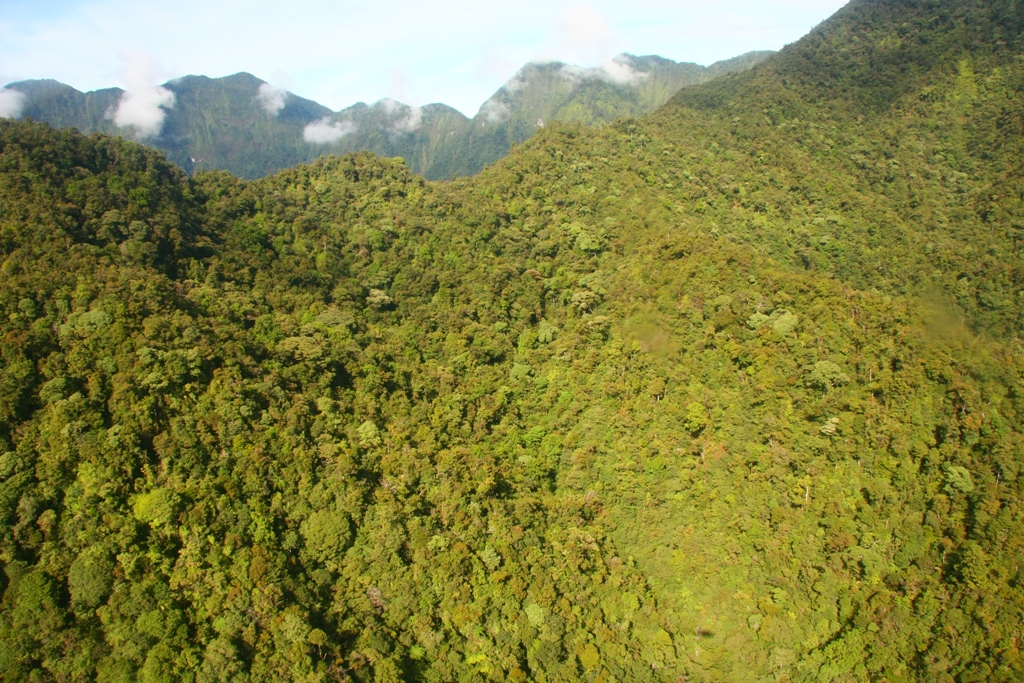
- Mount Bosavi, Southern Highlands province, Papua New Guinea

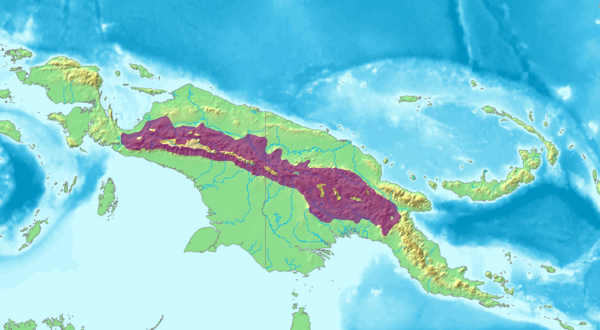
- Ecoregion territory (in purple)

Ecology
- Realm: Australasian realm
- Biome: tropical and subtropical moist broadleaf forests
- Borders: List: Central Range sub-alpine grasslands; Northern New Guinea lowland rain and freshwater swamp forests; Southeastern Papuan rain forests; Southern New Guinea lowland rain forests; Vogelkop–Aru lowland rain forests

Geography
- Area: 172,365 km^{2} (66,550 sq mi)
- Countries: Indonesia; Papua New Guinea
- Province: Papua
- Coordinates: 4.87°S 140.96°E

Conservation
- Conservation status: Relatively stable/intact
- Protected: 14.3%

The Central Range montane rain forests is a tropical moist forest ecoregion on the island of New Guinea. The ecoregion covers the Central Range of the New Guinea Highlands, which extends along the spine of the island. The montane rain forests of the ecoregion are distinct from the surrounding lowland forests, and are home to many endemic plants and animals.

== Geography ==
The ecoregion includes the montane rain forests of the Central Range, or Central Cordillera, between 1000 and 3000 metres elevation. The Central Range extends east and west across New Guinea, with the western portion of the range in Indonesia and the eastern portion in Papua New Guinea. The Central Range includes the Weyland Mountains at its western end, the Snow Mountains in Indonesia's Papua Province, the Star Mountains which span the Indonesia–Papua New Guinea border, and the Central and Eastern Highlands of Papua New Guinea.

The Bird's Neck Isthmus is at the western end of the Central Range. The isthmus' relatively low elevation (160 metres) separates the montane flora and fauna of the Central Range from those of the highlands on the Bird's Head and Bomberai peninsulas to the west.

Below 1000 metres, the montane forests transition to separate lowland forest ecoregions to the north, south, and west of the Central Range. The tree line is above 3000 metres elevation, above which are the high-elevation Central Range sub-alpine grasslands.

== Climate ==
The climate of the highlands is humid and tropical. Rainfall exceeds 2500 mm annually in most of the highlands, and can exceed 7000 mm annually in the wettest areas. Temperatures average 18º C in the highlands, generally decreasing with elevation. Frosts are rare below 2800 meters elevation.

The region of heaviest rainfall is called the midaltitude fringe high rainfall zone, which extends along the south slope of the middle Central Range. It is characterized by continuously heavy rainfall, with more than 50 mm every week. The upper Ok Tedi watershed, on the south slope of the highlands near the boundary between Papua New Guinea and Indonesia, is the wettest part of the highlands, with over 7000 mm of rainfall annually.

== Flora ==
There are three broad vegetation zones in the Central Range – lower montane forest, upper montane forest, and high mountain forest.

Lower montane forest extends from the lowland forest transition at approximately 1000 metres, up to 2,500 metres. Lower montane forest zone is characterized by trees in the beech family (Fagaceae) including Castanopsis acuminatissima and species of Lithocarpus, elaeocarps (Elaeocarpaceae), and laurels (Lauraceae). The conifers Araucaria cunninghamii var. papuana and Araucaria hunsteinii can form thick stands in some lower areas.

Upper montane forest occurs above 1500 m and is characterized by various evergreen species of southern beech (Nothofagus), either in mixed stands with trees of other species or in pure stands, particularly on ridge crests and upper slopes. Mosses and other epiphytes cover the trees. The Central Range has the greatest diversity of species from Nothfagus subgenus Brassospora.

High mountain forest begins at approximately 2500 metres elevation, and extends to the tree line, in places extending to 3,900 m in the higher-elevation subalpine grasslands ecoregion. Characteristic trees are conifers – species of Podocarpus, Dacrycarpus, Dacridium, Papuacedrus, Araucaria, and Libocedrus – along with broadleaf trees in the myrtle family (Myrtaceae). High mountain forest generally has a thin canopy, lower than the upper montane forests, and thick understory.

== Fauna ==
The ecoregion is home to 90 species of mammals, including marsupials, murid rodents, and bats. 44 species are endemic or near-endemic species whose ranges extend into neighboring ecoregions.

A range of Australasian tropical marsupials are native to the ecoregion, including tree kangaroos. Endemic marsupials include the speckled dasyure (Neophascogale lorentzii), great-tailed triok (Dactylopsila megalura), Stein's cuscus (Phalanger vestitus), Telefomin cuscus (Phalanger matanim), Weyland ringtail possum (Pseudocheirus caroli), and Pygmy ringtail possum (Pseudocheirus mayeri). Near-endemic marsupial species include the red-bellied marsupial shrew (Phascolosorex doriae) black-tailed dasyure (Murexia melanurus), Macleay's dorcopsis (Dorcopsulus macleayi), mouse bandicoot (Microperoryctes murina), and Clara's echymipera (Echymipera clara).

Three bat species – the Telefomin roundleaf bat (Hipposideros corynophyllus), New Guinea sheath-tailed bat (Emballonura furax), and small-toothed long-eared bat (Nyctophilus microdon) – are endemic. Near-endemic bat species include the Fly River roundleaf bat (Hipposideros muscinus), Greater Papuan pipistrelle (Pipistrellus collinus), Fly River trumpet-eared bat (Kerivoula muscina), Mantled mastiff bat (Otomops secundus), moss-forest blossom bat (Syconycteris hobbit), and Bulmer's fruit bat (Aproteles bulmerae). Bulmer's fruit bat is critically endangered.

Endemic murid rodents include short-haired water rat (Paraleptomys wilhelmina), mountain water rat (Baiyankamys habbema), lesser small-toothed rat (Macruromys elegans), red-bellied mosaic-tailed rat (Protochromys fellowsi), large-scaled mosaic-tailed rat (Mammelomys lanosus), white-toothed brush mouse (Brassomys albidens), Giluwe rat (Rattus giluwensis), and Champion's tree mouse (Pogonomys championi). Near-endemic and limited-range native murids include the large leptomys (Leptomys elegans), mottled-tailed shrew mouse (Pseudohydromys fuscus), eastern shrew mouse (Pseudohydromys murinus), one-toothed shew mouse (Pseudohydromys ellermani), western water rat (Hydromys hussoni), earless water rat (Crossomys moncktoni), mimic tree rat (Xenuromys barbatus), Lorentz's mosaic-tailed rat (Paramelomys lorentzii), Shaw Mayer's brush mouse (Pogonomelomys mayeri), lowland brush mouse (Pogonomelomys bruijni), highland brush mouse (Abeomelomys sevia), New Guinean rat (Rattus novaeguineae), western white-eared giant rat (Hyomys dammermani), Shaw Mayer's water rat (Baiyankamys shawmayeri), and Ernst Mayr's water rat (Leptomys ernstmayri). Three murids - the large leptomys, eastern shrew mouse, and lesser small-toothed rat – are critically endangered.

348 bird species live in the ecoregion. 55 bird species are endemic or near endemic. Endemic bird species include the Papuan whipbird (Androphobus viridis), sooty shrike-thrush (Colluricincla umbrina), Snow Mountain munia (Lonchura montana), black-breasted munia (Lonchura teerinki), Archbold's bowerbird (Archboldia papuensis), short-tailed paradigalla (Paradigalla brevicauda), and King-of-Saxony bird-of-paradise (Pteridophora alberti). The ecoregion, together with the Central Range sub-alpine grasslands, constitutes the Central Papuan Mountains endemic bird area. Some of the near-endemic birds also range into the sub-alpine grasslands, and/or into other New Guinea mountain ranges.

Butterfly centres of endemism in the ecoregion include the Weyland Mountains, with nine endemic species, and the Hagen-Sepik-Wahgi Divide, with five endemic species.

== Protected areas ==
14.3% of the ecoregion is in protected areas. They include:

- Enarotali Nature Reserve
- Pegunungan Wayland Nature Reserve
- Lorentz National Park
- Pegunungan Jayawijaya Wildlife Reserve
- Memberamo Foja Wildlife Reserve
- Mount Gahavisuka Provincial Park
- Siwi-Utame Wildlife Management Area
- Jimi (Ruti) Valley National Park
- Lake Kutubu Wildlife Management Area
- Crater Mountain Wildlife Management Area
- Hunstein Range Wildlife Management Area
- Laugum Island Wildlife Management Area
- Libano-Arisai Wildlife Management Area
- Libano-Hose Wildlife Management Area
- Sulamesi Wildlife Management Area
- Mt Wilhelm National Park
