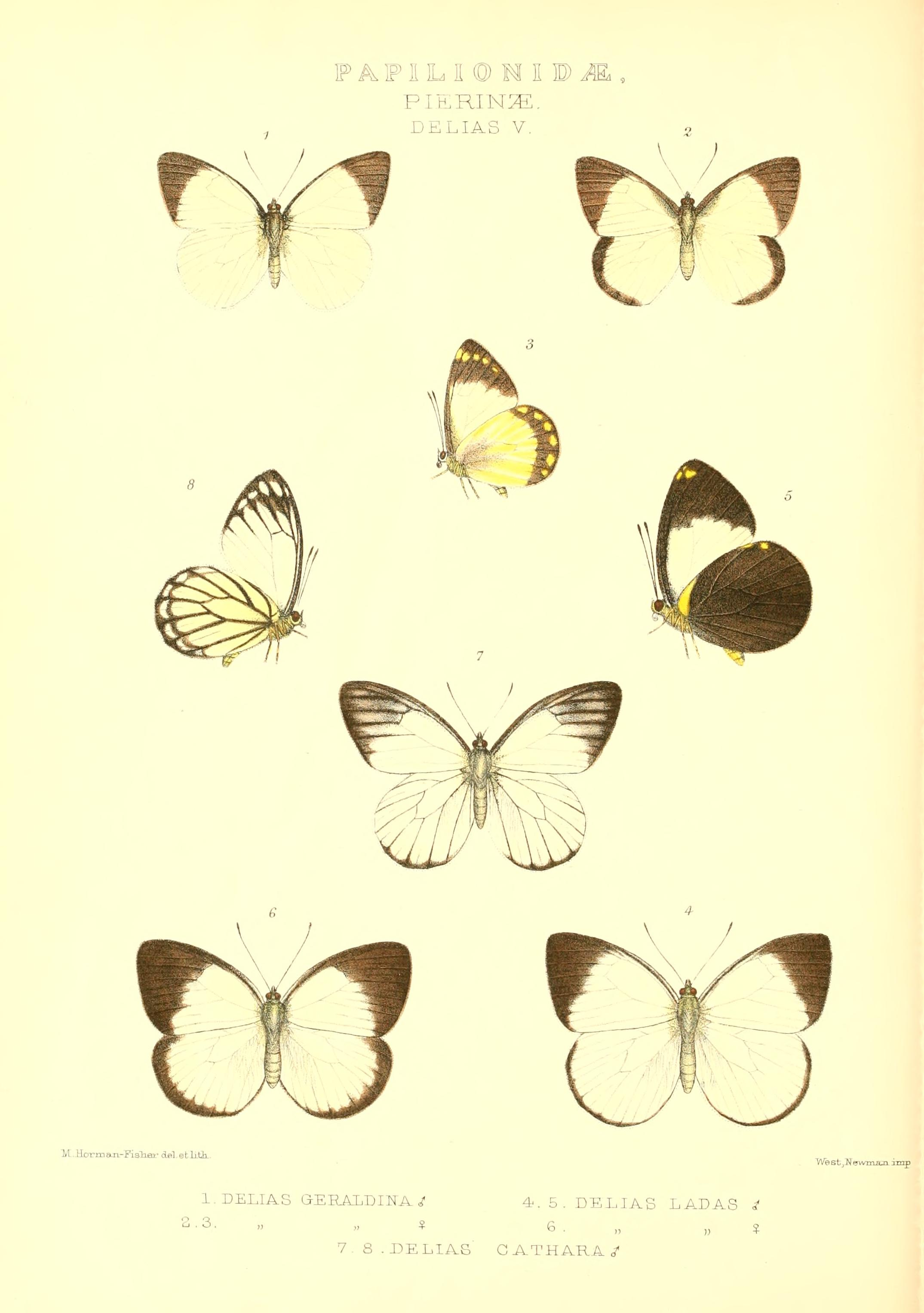
- In Henley Grose-Smith and William Forsell Kirby's Rhopalocera exotica

Scientific classification
- Domain: Eukaryota
- Kingdom: Animalia
- Phylum: Arthropoda
- Class: Insecta
- Order: Lepidoptera
- Family: Pieridae
- Genus: Delias
- Species: D. geraldina

Binomial name
- Delias geraldina Grose-Smith, 1894

Synonyms
- Tachyris weiskei Ribbe, 1900 (preocc. Ribbe, 1900); Delias emilia Rothschild, 1904; Delias geraldina siderea f. flavescens Roepke, 1955

= Delias geraldina =

Species of butterfly

Delias geraldina is a butterfly in the family Pieridae. It was described by Henley Grose-Smith in 1894. It is found in the Australasian realm where it is endemic to New Guinea.

== Subspecies ==
- D. g. geraldina (Central Highlands, Papua New Guinea)
- D. g. emilia Rothschild & Jordan, 1904 Oetakwa River, Irian Jaya
- D. g. masakoae Nakano, 1998 (Bintang, Kec Okbibab, Irian Jaya)
- D. g. onin Yagishita, 2003 (Fakfak, Irian Jaya)
- D. g. siderea Roepke, 1955 (Wamena, Irian Jaya)
- D. g. vaneechoudi Roepke, 1955 (Weyland Mountains & Paniai, Irian Jaya)
- D. g. vogelcopensis Yagishita, 1993 (Arfak & Wandammen Mountains, Irian Jaya)
