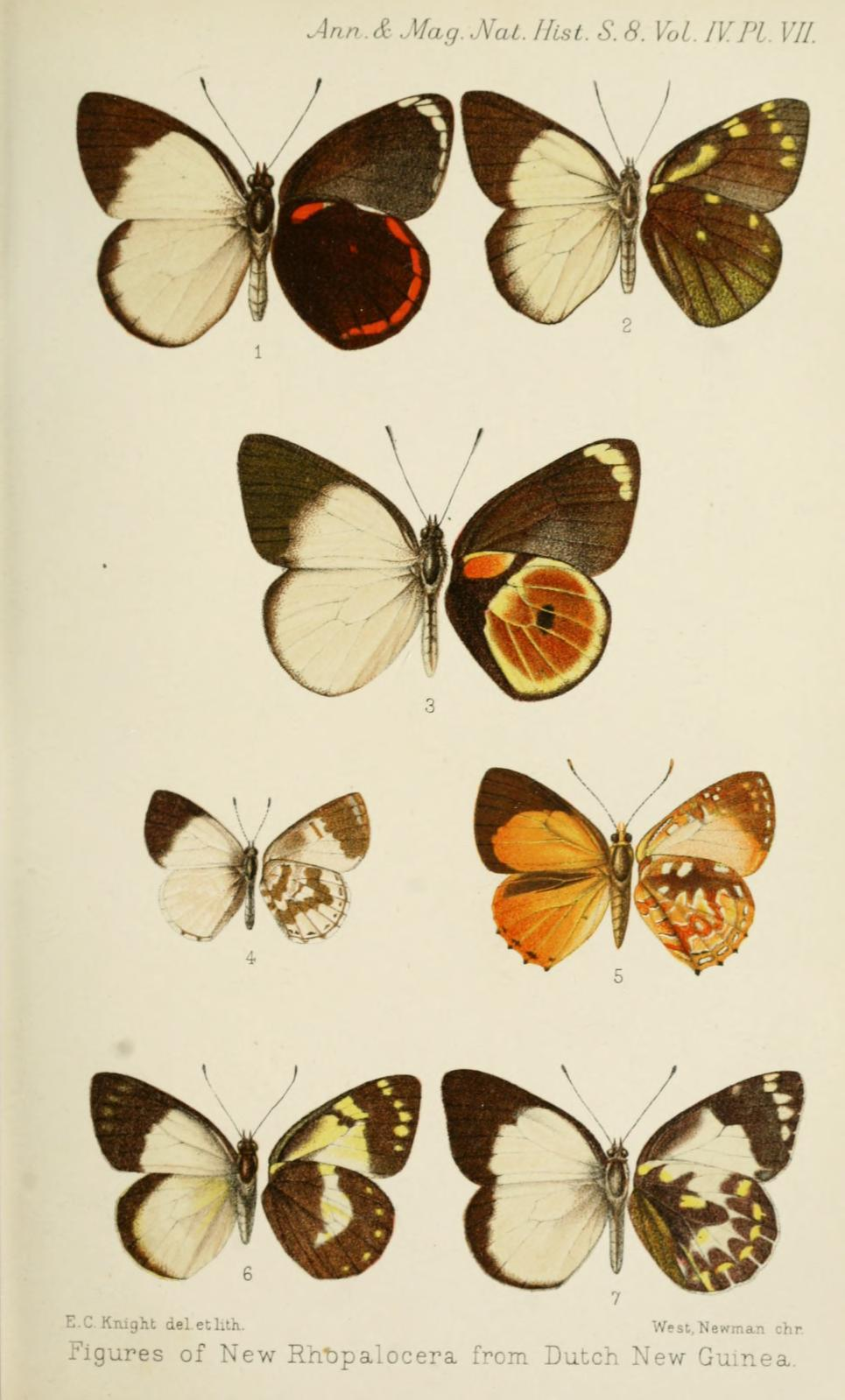
- Delias caroli in Kenrick, 1909 Descriptions of Delias from New Guinea (fig.1)

Scientific classification
- Kingdom: Animalia
- Phylum: Arthropoda
- Clade: Pancrustacea
- Class: Insecta
- Order: Lepidoptera
- Family: Pieridae
- Genus: Delias
- Species: D. caroli

Binomial name
- Delias caroli Kenrick, 1909

Synonyms
- Delias caroli ab. flava Joicey & Noakes, 1915

= Delias caroli =

Species of butterfly

Delias caroli is a butterfly in the family Pieridae. It was described by George Hamilton Kenrick in 1909. It is found in New Guinea.

== Description ==
Delias caroli, 'sp.n. (Pl. VIL. fig. 1.) Male: Head, legs, palpi, and antennae black; thorax black, with black hairs beneath and bluish-white hairs above; abdomen mostly white, with bluish-white hairs at base and at base of hind wings.Upperside: fore wings white, with narrow black costal border and large apical patch bounded by end of cell and continuing obliquely to angle.Hind wings white, with undefined black border tapering from costa to angle; fringes black.Underside: fore wings black, with narrow white band along the inner margin, and four apical white spots fading into a narrow white subterminal line.Hind wings black, with lenticular scarlet basal patch ending in a white dot on costa; a single minute red spot at end of cell near to nervure 5; a narrow scarlet subterminal band from costa to angle, split up by the black nervures, each surrounded by a few white scales; a patch of white scattered scales between the angle and the base.

The female is similar, but the white is slightly suffused with yellow, and the upperside of the abdomen is yellow, while the black margin of the hind wing is wider.

Near to Delias bornemanni [Ribbe, 1900], but differs in the position and form of the red band on the hind wings.Expanse 58 mm.

Hab. Warmasin, 6000 feet, November and December.

== Subspecies ==
- D. c. caroli (Arfak Mountains, Irian Jaya)
- D. c. wandammenensae Joicey & Talbot, 1916 (Wandammen Mountains and Weyland Mountains, Irian Jaya)
