= Vogelkop–Aru lowland rain forests =

Ecoregion in Indonesia

Vogelkop-Aru lowland rain forests
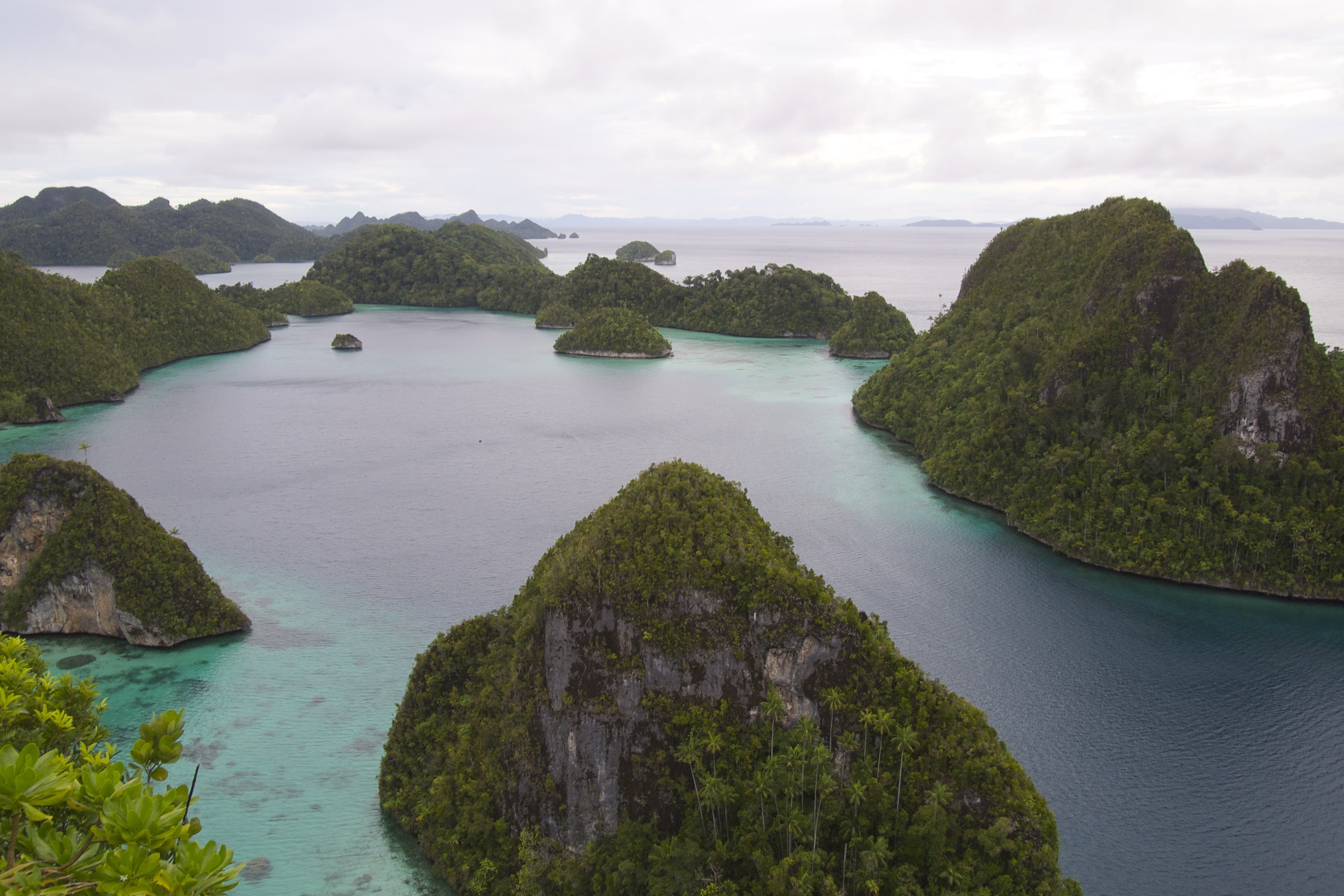
- Wayag Islands

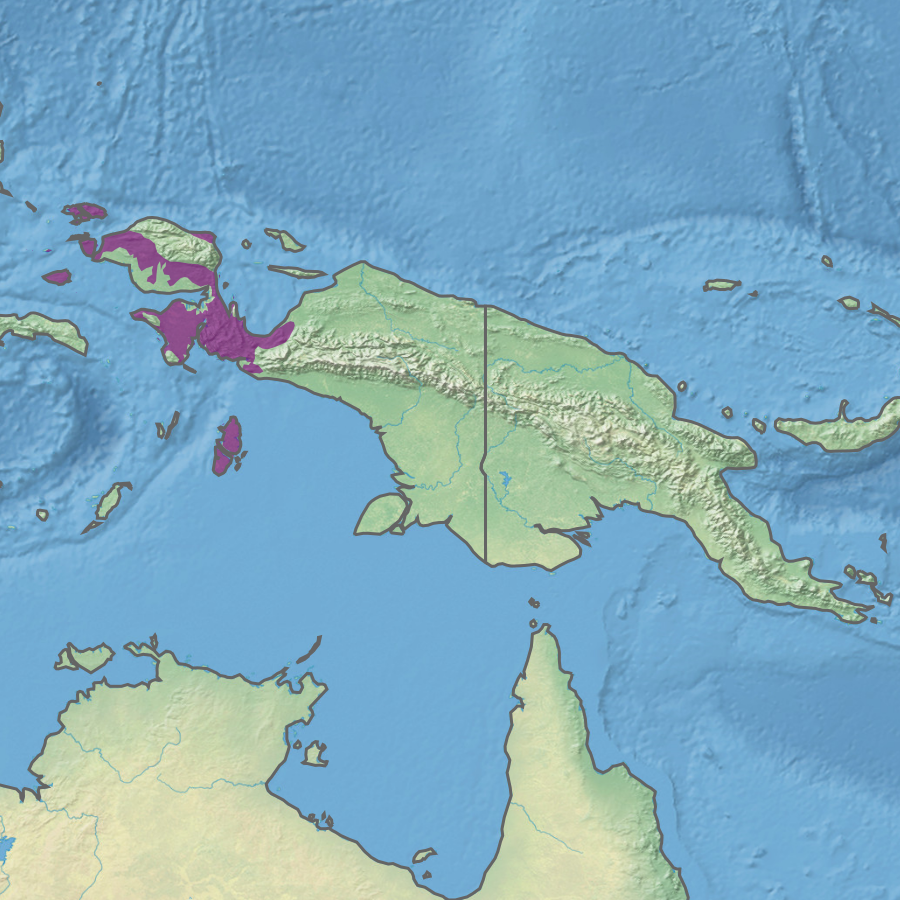
- Ecoregion territory (in purple)

Ecology
- Realm: Australasian realm
- Biome: tropical and subtropical moist broadleaf forests
- Borders: List: Central Range montane rain forests; New Guinea mangroves; Northern New Guinea lowland rain and freshwater swamp forests; Southern New Guinea freshwater swamp forests; Southern New Guinea lowland rain forests; Vogelkop montane rain forests

Geography
- Area: 75,270 km^{2} (29,060 sq mi)
- Countries: Indonesia
- Province: Maluku; Papua, West Papua
- Coordinates: 1.22°S 132.23°E

Conservation
- Conservation status: Relatively stable/intact
- Protected: 7,557 km² (10%)

The Vogelkop–Aru lowland rain forests is a tropical moist forest ecoregion in Indonesia. The ecoregion covers the peninsular lowlands of western New Guinea, along with the Aru Islands and other nearby islands.

== Geography ==
The ecoregion includes the lowland and hill (below 1000 meters elevation) forests of the Bird's Head Peninsula (also known as the Vogelkop Peninsula), Bomberai Peninsula, and the Bird's Neck Isthmus, as well as the Aru Islands to the south and Raja Ampat Islands (Misool, Salawati, Waigeo, Kofiau, and others) to the west.

The Aru and Raja Ampat islands sit on the Australia-New Guinea continental shelf. When sea levels were lower during the ice ages, these islands were joined to the Australia-New Guinea continent, which allowed terrestrial plants and animals to move between them.

The peninsular mountains above 1000 meters elevation, including the Arfak Mountains and Tamrau Mountains, constitute the separate and distinct Vogelkop montane rain forests ecoregion.

== Climate ==
The ecoregion has a tropical rain forest climate.

== Flora ==
The vegetation of the ecoregion is tropical wet evergreen forest, including lowland alluvial forests, hill forests, and limestone forests.

Lowland alluvial forest has an irregular, multi-tiered canopy with many emergents. The understory has shrub layer, where palms are common, and an herb layer. Climbers, epiphytes, and ferns are abundant. Common canopy trees include Pometia pinnata, Octomeles sumatrana, Alstonia scholaris, and species of Ficus and Terminalia. Other tree genera include Pterocarpus, Artocarpus, Planchonella, Canarium, Elaeocarpus, Cryptocarya, Celtis, Dracontomelon, Dysoxylum, Syzygium, Vitex, Spondias, and Intsia.

Lowland hill forest has a lower, more closed and regular tree canopy than the alluvial forest. The shrub layer is more open with fewer palms, and there is a denser herbaceous layer. Dominant canopy trees include species of Pometia, Canarium, Anisoptera, Cryptocarya, Terminalia, Syzygium, Ficus, Celtis, Dysoxylum, and Buchanania. Species of Koompassia, Dillenia, Eucalyptopsis, Vatica, and Hopea are locally abundant. The conifer Araucaria cunninghamii var. papuana forms dense groves in scattered locations.

On Waigeo Island and the adjacent northwest coast of New Guinea, ultramafic rocks result in a serpentine flora, a belt of low shrubby vegetation composed of Alphitonia, Dillenia alata, Myrtella beccarii, and Styphelia abnormis.

== Fauna ==
The ecoregion has 47 species of mammals, including marsupials, murid rodents, and bats. Native mammals include the Arfak long-beaked echidna (Zaglossus bruijni), dusky pademelon (Thylogale bruinji), New Guinea quoll (Dasyurus albopunctatus), red-bellied dasyure (Phascolosorex doriae), ursine tree-kangaroo (Dendrolagus ursinus), brown forest wallaby (Dorcopsis muelleri), Lorentz's mosaic-tailed rat (Melomys lorentzii), Shaw Mayer's brush mouse (Pogonomelomys mayeri) and lowland brush mouse (Pogonomelomys bruijni). the Arfak long-beaked echidna is critically endangered, and the dusky pademelon and ursine tree-kangaroo are considered vulnerable. There are no strictly endemic mammal species, but several species are threatened or have a limited range.

The ecoregion has 366 species of birds, of which nine are endemic. It encompasses the West Papuan lowlands and Aru Islands endemic bird areas. Endemic birds include Bruijn's brush-turkey (Aepypodius bruijnii), Kofiau paradise kingfisher, (Tanysiptera ellioti), black-backed monarch (Monarcha julianae), Wilson's bird-of-paradise, (Cicinnurus respublica), and red bird-of-paradise (Paradisaea rubra).

The largest bird in the ecoregion is the flightless southern cassowary (Casuarius casuarius).

== Protected areas ==
A 2017 assessment found that 7,557 km^{2}, or 10%, of the ecoregion is in protected areas. About 70% of the unprotected area is still forested. Protected areas include Pulau Baun Wildlife Reserve, Sorong Nature Recreation Park, Gunung Meja Nature Recreation Park, Pulau Sabuda dan Pulau Tataruga Wildlife Reserve, Pegunungan Wondiboy Nature Reserve, Teluk Cendrawasih Marine National Park, Pegunungan Arfak Nature Reserve, Pegunungan Kumawa Nature Reserve, Pegunungan Fakfak Nature Reserve, Pulau Misool Nature Reserve, and Pulau Salawati Utara Nature Reserve.
