= Vogelkop montane rain forests =

Ecoregion in New Guinea

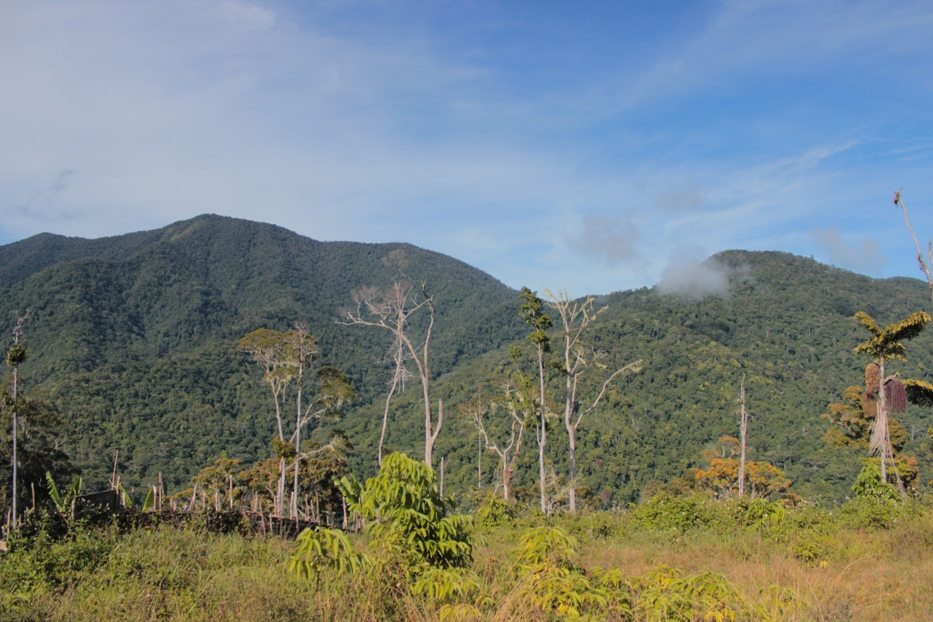
- Arfak Mountains

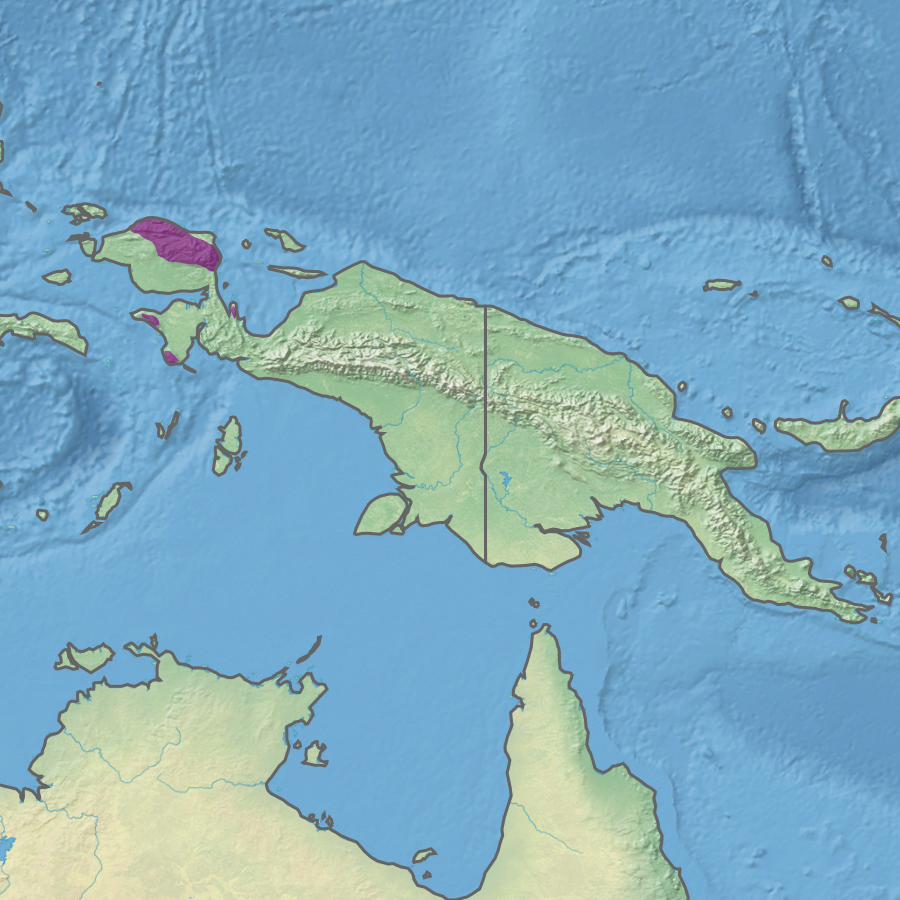
- Ecoregion territory (in purple)

Ecology
- Realm: Australasian realm
- Biome: tropical and subtropical moist broadleaf forests
- Borders: Vogelkop-Aru lowland rain forests

Geography
- Area: 21,679 km^{2} (8,370 sq mi)
- Countries: Indonesia
- Province: West Papua
- Coordinates: 0.95°S 133.1°E

Conservation
- Conservation status: Vulnerable
- Protected: 11,958 km² (55%)

The Vogelkop montane rain forests is a tropical moist forest ecoregion in western New Guinea. The ecoregion covers the mountains of western New Guinea's Bird's Head and Bomberai peninsulas.

== Geography ==
The ecoregion includes the montane forests above 1000 meters elevation on the Bird's Head (also known as Vogelkop) and Bomberai peninsulas. The largest area is in the Arfak Mountains and Tamrau Mountains on the Bird's Head Peninsula, with smaller areas in the Fakfak and Kumawa mountains on the western Bomberai Peninsula, and the mountains of the eastern Wandammen Peninsula on Cenderawasih Bay. Mount Arfak (2955 m) is the highest point in the ecoregion. The Vogelkop-Aru lowland rain forests ecoregion occupies the surrounding foothills and lowlands.

== Climate ==
The ecoregion has a montane tropical rain forest climate.

== Flora ==
The ecoregion's forests are of several types, which vary with rainfall, elevation, and underlying soils. The lower montane forests are dominated by Castanopsis acuminatissima, along with Lithocarpus spp. and trees in the laurel family (Lauraceae), myrtle family (Myrtaceae), and others. At higher elevations, forests of Antarctic beech (Nothofagus) are predominant, draped with mosses and other epiphytes. Conifers are predominant at the highest elevations, including species of Dacrycarpus, Dacridium, and Papuacedrus. There are also areas of limestone forest and semi-evergreen montane rain forest.

== Fauna ==
The ecoregion has 42 species of mammals, including marsupials, murid rodents, and bats. There are three endemic marsupials, the Vogelkop tree-kangaroo (Dendrolagus ursinus), Wondiwoi tree-kangaroo (Dendrolagus mayri), and Arfak ringtail (Pseudocheirus schlegeli). Leptomys arfakensis is a species of rodent endemic to the Arfak Mountains. Several mammal species are threatened or have a limited range.

The ecoregion has 304 species of birds, of which seven are endemic. The endemic species are the white-striped forest rail (Rallina leucospila), Vogelkop whistler (Pachycephala meyeri), grey-banded munia (Lonchura vana), Vogelkop bowerbird (Amblyornis inornata), Vogelkop honeyeater (Melidectes leucostephes), Arfak honeyeater (Melipotes gymnops), Arfak astrapia (Astrapia nigra), and western parotia (Parotia sefilata). It encompasses the West Papuan highlands endemic bird area.

== Protected areas ==
A 2017 assessment found that 11,958 km², or 55%, of the ecoregion is in protected areas. About half of the unprotected area is still forested. Protected areas include Tamrau Utara Nature Reserve (3683.65 km²), Pegunungan Tamrau Selatan Nature Reserve (2478.75 km²), Pegunungan Arfak Nature Reserve (683.25 km²), Pegunungan Kumawa Nature Reserve (1881.5 km²), Pegunungan Fakfak Nature Reserve (343.91 km²), and Pegunungan Wondiboi Nature Reserve (795.0 km²).
