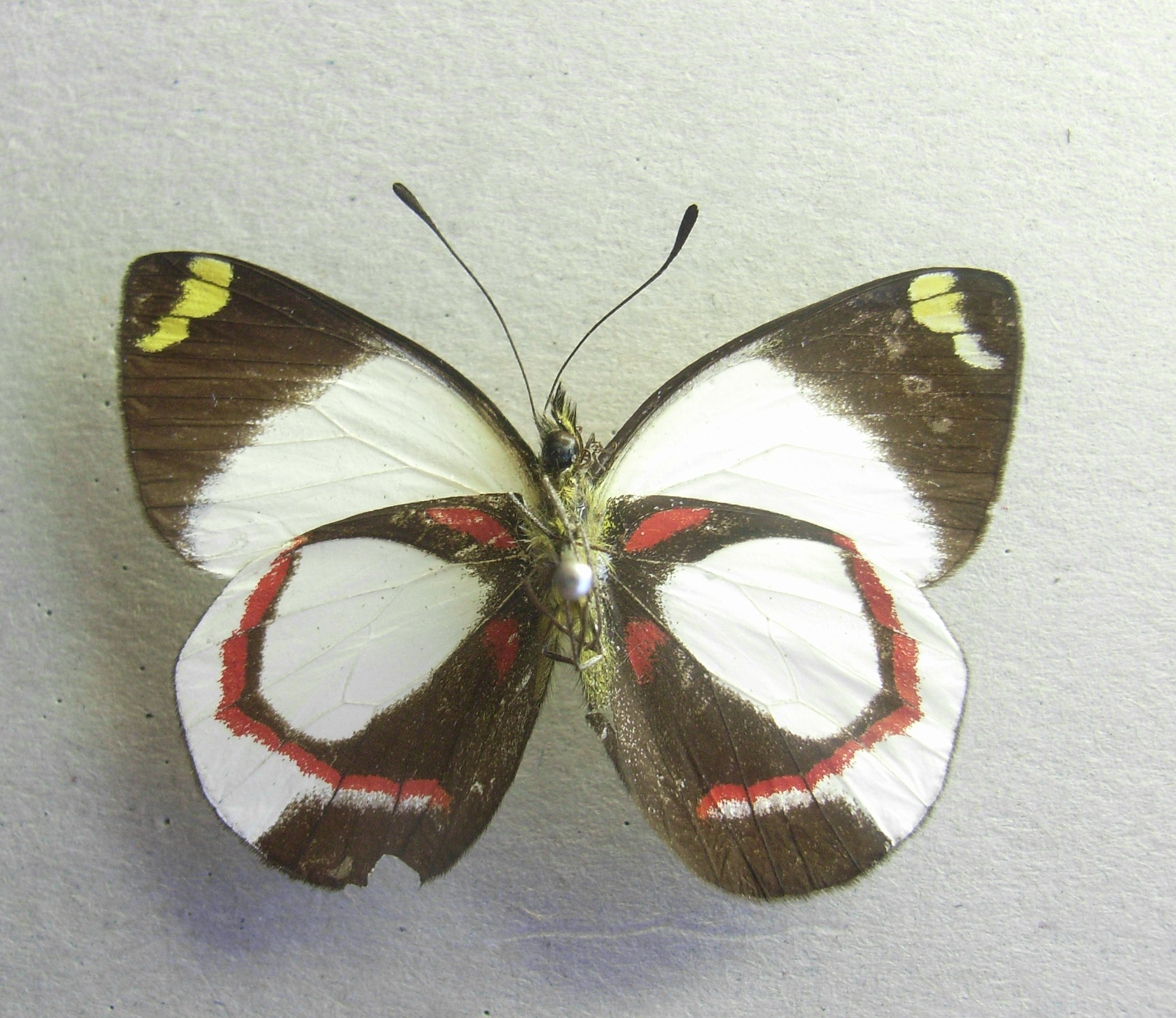
- Delias isocharis isocharis

Scientific classification
- Domain: Eukaryota
- Kingdom: Animalia
- Phylum: Arthropoda
- Class: Insecta
- Order: Lepidoptera
- Family: Pieridae
- Genus: Delias
- Species: D. isocharis

Binomial name
- Delias isocharis Rothschild & Jordan, 1907

= Delias isocharis =

Species of butterfly

Delias isocharis is a butterfly in the family Pieridae. It was described by Walter Rothschild and Karl Jordan in 1907. It is endemic to New Guinea.

The wingspan is about 40–43 mm. Adults are similar to Delias ligata..

== Subspecies ==
- D. i. isocharis (Central Highlands, Papua New Guinea)
- D. i. latiapicalis Joicey & Talbot, 1922 (Weyland Mountains, Irian Jaya)
