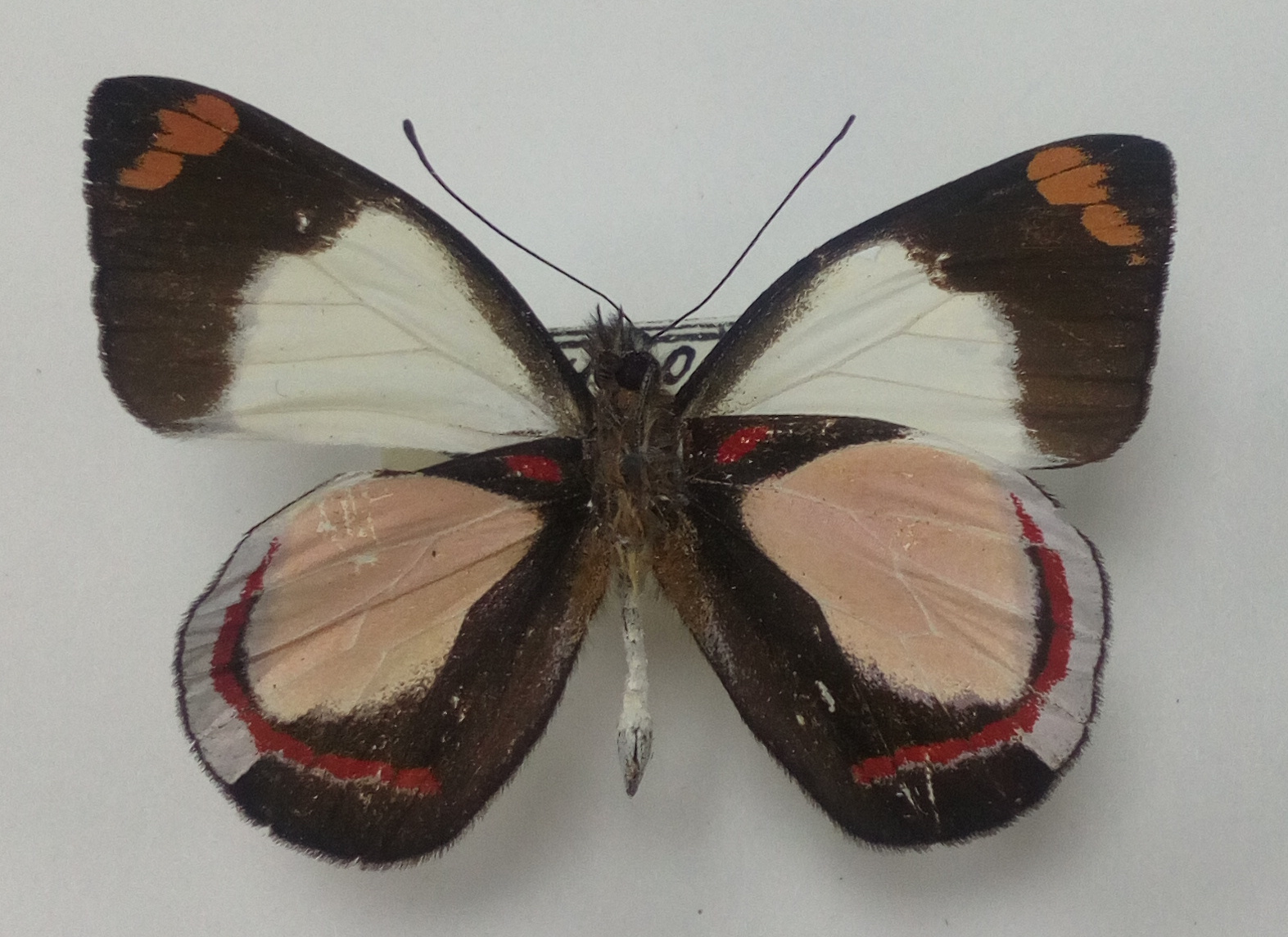

Scientific classification
- Kingdom: Animalia
- Phylum: Arthropoda
- Class: Insecta
- Order: Lepidoptera
- Family: Pieridae
- Genus: Delias
- Species: D. dixeyi

Binomial name
- Delias dixeyi Kenrick, 1909

= Delias dixeyi =

Species of butterfly

Delias dixeyi is a butterfly in the family Pieridae. It was described by George Hamilton Kenrick in 1909. It is found in New Guinea (Arfak Mountains).

The wingspan is about 42–45 mm. Adults do not have a red spot below the cell of the underside of the hindwings like most species in the Delias kummeri species group.
