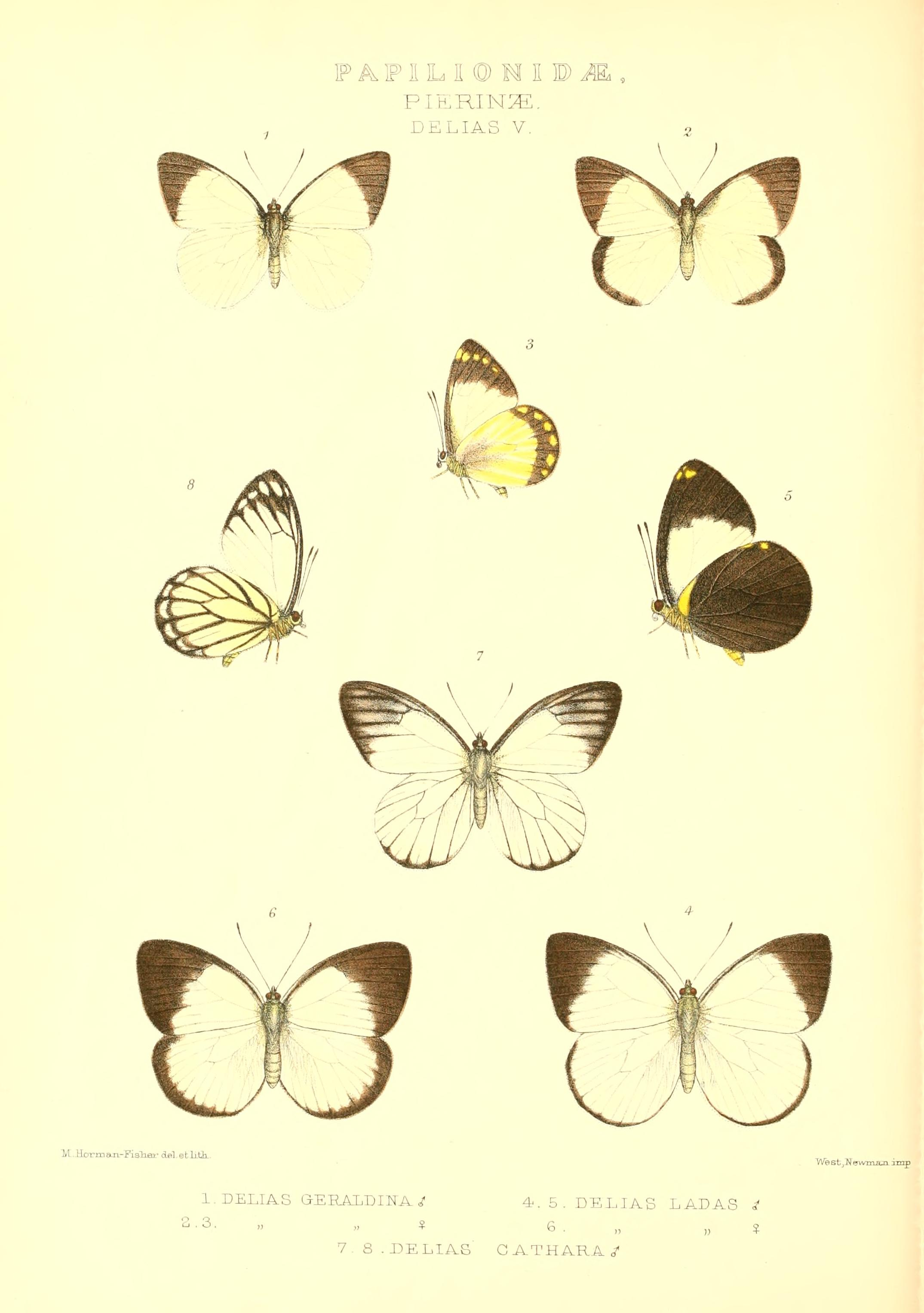

Scientific classification
- Kingdom: Animalia
- Phylum: Arthropoda
- Clade: Pancrustacea
- Class: Insecta
- Order: Lepidoptera
- Family: Pieridae
- Genus: Delias
- Species: D. ladas

Binomial name
- Delias ladas Grose-Smith, 1894

= Delias ladas =

Species of butterfly

Delias ladas is a butterfly in the family Pieridae. It was described by Henley Grose-Smith in 1894. It is endemic to New Guinea.

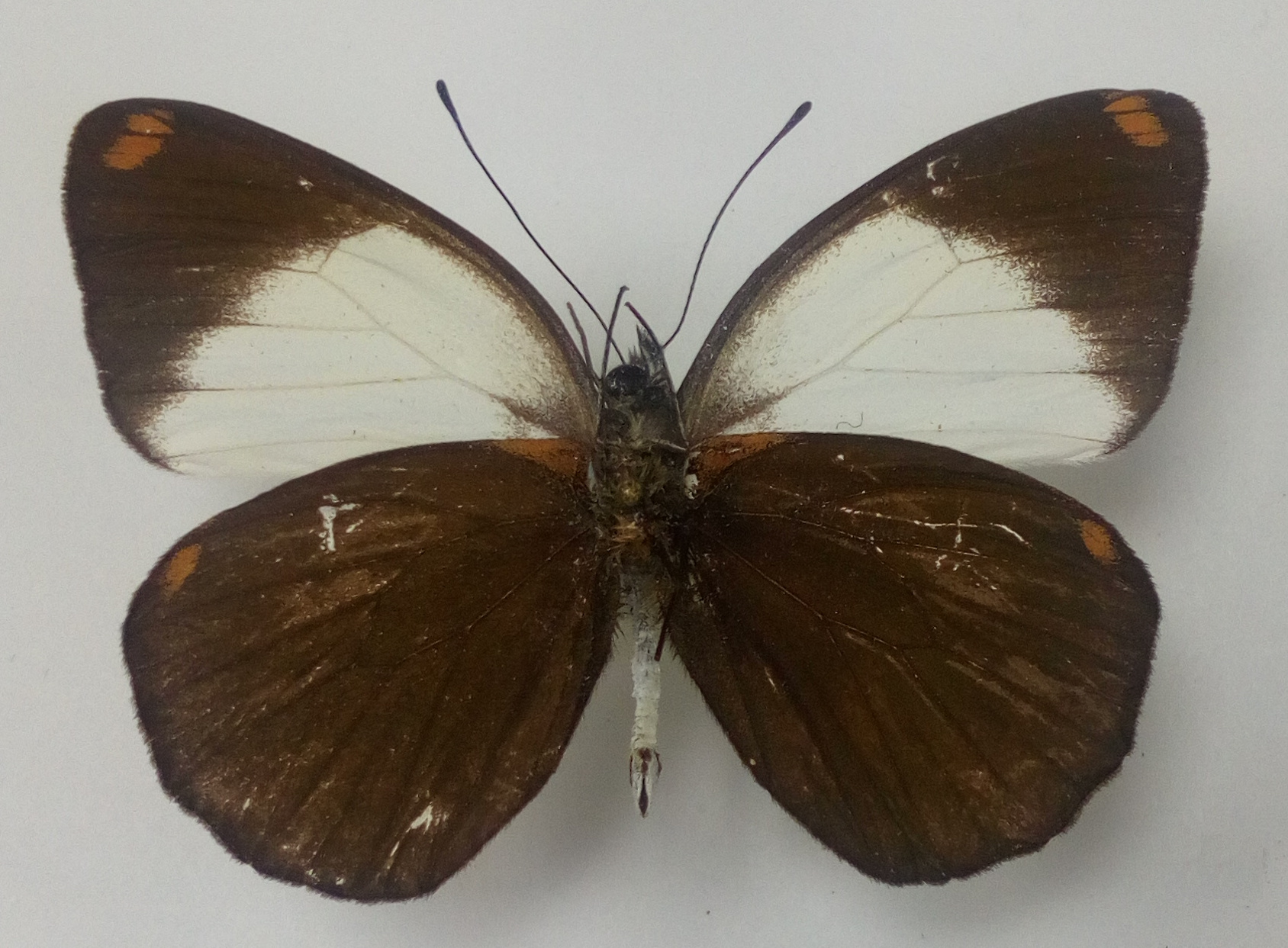

== Subspecies ==
- D. l. ladas (West Papua New Guinea)
- D. l. levis Joicey & Talbot, 1922 (Arfak and Weyland Mountains, Irian Jaya)
- D. l. waigeuensis Joicey & Talbot, 1917 (Waigeo Island)
- D. l. wamenaensis Morita, 1993 (Ilaga - Wamena, Irian Jaya)
- D. l. yapenensis Yagishita, 1998 (Yapen Island)
- D. l. fakfakensis Yagishita, 2003 (Fakfak, Irian Jaya)
