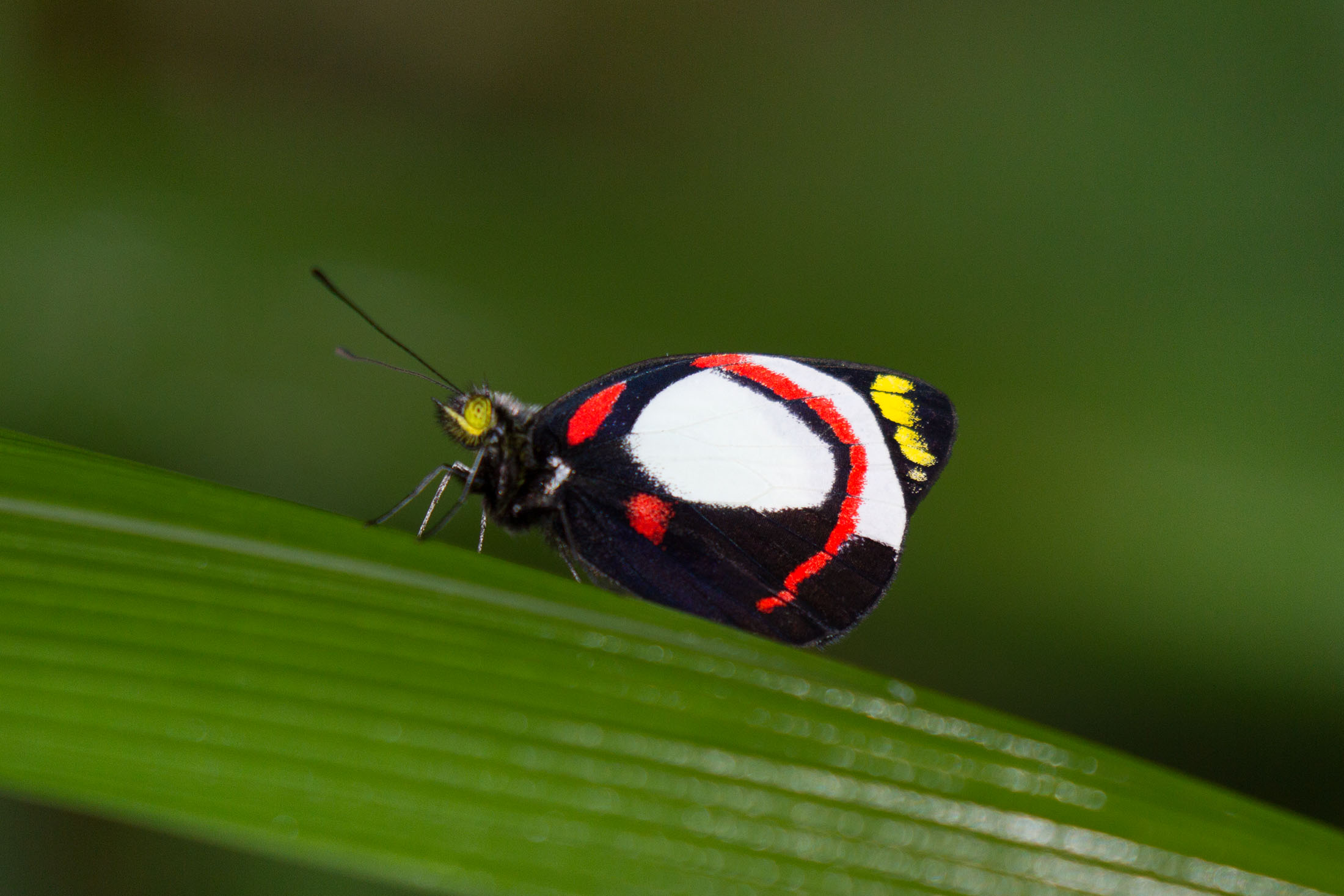
- Delias ligata dealbata male

Scientific classification
- Domain: Eukaryota
- Kingdom: Animalia
- Phylum: Arthropoda
- Class: Insecta
- Order: Lepidoptera
- Family: Pieridae
- Genus: Delias
- Species: D. ligata

Binomial name
- Delias ligata Rothschild, 1904

Synonyms
- Delias kummeri f. ligata Rothschild, 1904

= Delias ligata =

Species of butterfly

Delias ligata is a species of butterfly in the family Pieridae. It was first described by Walter Rothschild in 1904 and is endemic to New Guinea.

The wingspan is about 45–52 mm

== Subspecies ==
- D. l. ligata (Central Highlands, Papua New Guinea)
- D. l. weylandensis Joicey & Talbot, 1922 (Weyland Mountains, Irian Jaya)
- D. l. dealbata Talbot, 1928 (Arfak Mountains, Irian Jaya)
- D. l. interpolate Roepke, 1955 (Mount Sigi, Irian Jaya)
