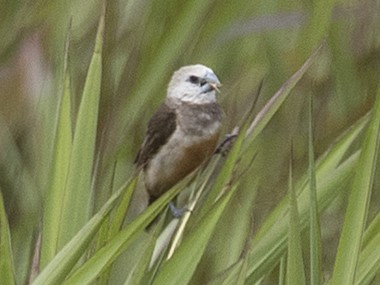

Conservation status
- Least Concern (IUCN 3.1)

Scientific classification
- Kingdom: Animalia
- Phylum: Chordata
- Class: Aves
- Order: Passeriformes
- Family: Estrildidae
- Genus: Lonchura
- Species: L. vana

Binomial name
- Lonchura vana (Hartert, 1930)

= Grey-banded mannikin =

Species of bird

The grey-banded mannikin (Lonchura vana), or grey-banded munia, is a species of estrildid finch known to be found in Anggi Gigi, Tamrau Mountains, and Arfak Mountains in the Vogelkop Peninsula in north-western Papua, Indonesia. This species inhabits mid-mountain wet grassland and marshland. It also can be found on abandoned agricultural plots near human settlements.

== Identification ==
The grey-banded mannikin is approximately 10 cm long. This species is a grey pale-headed munia with brownish-grey breast, narrow and grey lower breast-band, rufous-brown belly, dark brown mantle and wings, and pale yellow rump and tail.

== Threats ==
Its natural habitat is reported to be destroyed by farmers for agricultural practices. However, it can be found on agricultural plots and may be able to survive in this habitat.

== Conservation measures ==
Proposals include further identifying the bird's habitat requirements, threats to those requirements at Anggi Gigi, and conservation of wet grassland and marshland sites in Anggi Gigi as protected areas. Other potentially useful measures would be to establish whether the Pegunungan Arfak Nature Reserve supports the species and to find suitable habitat in northeast Papua to conserve this species.
