= Ecoregions of New Guinea =

New Guinea, lying within the tropics and with extensive mountain areas, comprises a wide range of ecoregions. These include rainforests, grasslands and mangrove.

== Terrestrial ecoregions ==
New Guinea is in the Australasian realm, which also includes the islands of Wallacea to the west, the Bismarck Archipelago, Solomon Islands, and Vanuatu to the east, and Australia and New Zealand.

Sea levels were lower during the Ice Ages, which exposed the shallow continental shelf and connected New Guinea to Australia into a single land mass. Several nearby islands, including the Aru Islands, most of the Raja Ampat Islands, and Yapen, were also connected to the mainland, which allowed the flora and fauna of New Guinea and the continental shelf islands to mix.

=== Tropical and subtropical moist broadleaf forests ===
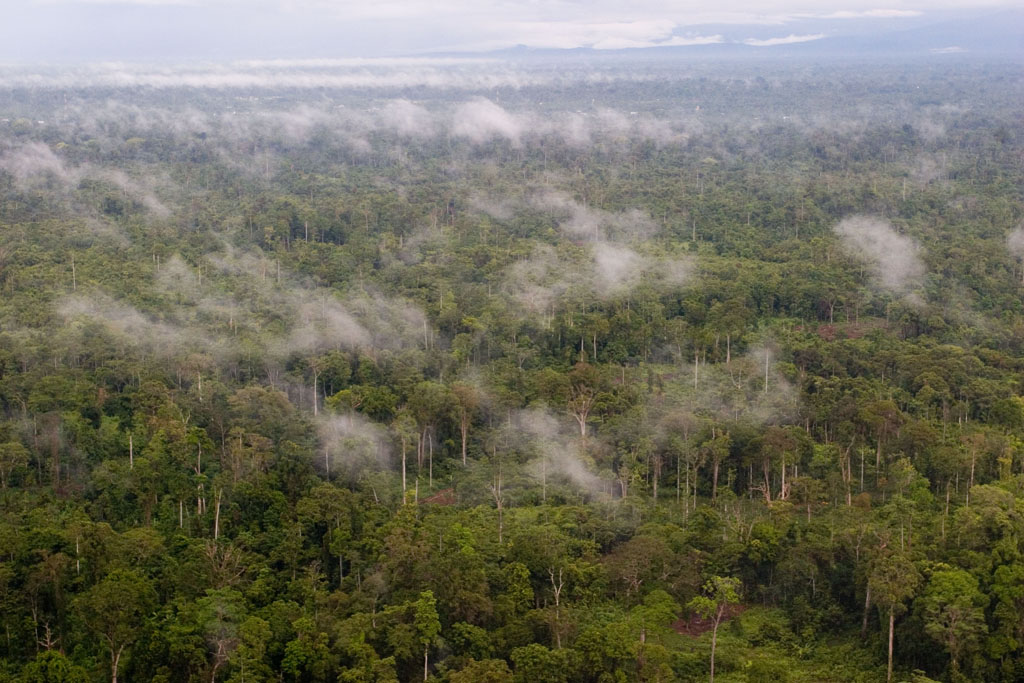
The lowland rainforest of the Western New Guinea

- Central Range montane rain forests
- Huon Peninsula montane rain forests
- Northern New Guinea lowland rain and freshwater swamp forests
- Northern New Guinea montane rain forests
- Southeastern Papuan rain forests
- Southern New Guinea freshwater swamp forests
- Southern New Guinea lowland rain forests
- Vogelkop–Aru lowland rain forests
- Vogelkop montane rain forests

=== Tropical and subtropical grasslands, savannas, and shrublands ===
- Trans-Fly savanna and grasslands

=== Montane grasslands and shrublands ===
- Central Range sub-alpine grasslands

=== Mangrove ===
- New Guinea mangroves

== Freshwater ecoregions ==
- Vogelkop–Bomberai
- New Guinea North Coast
- New Guinea Central Mountains
- Southwest New Guinea - Trans-Fly Lowland
- Papuan Peninsula

== Marine ecoregions ==
The oceans around New Guinea are part of the Central Indo-Pacific marine realm. The realm is divided into marine provinces, which are further divided into marine ecoregions.

- Western Coral Triangle province
  - Papua
- Eastern Coral Triangle province
  - Bismarck Sea
  - Solomon Sea
  - Southeast Papua New Guinea
- Sahul Shelf province
  - Gulf of Papua
  - Arafura Sea

== See also ==
- Fauna of New Guinea
