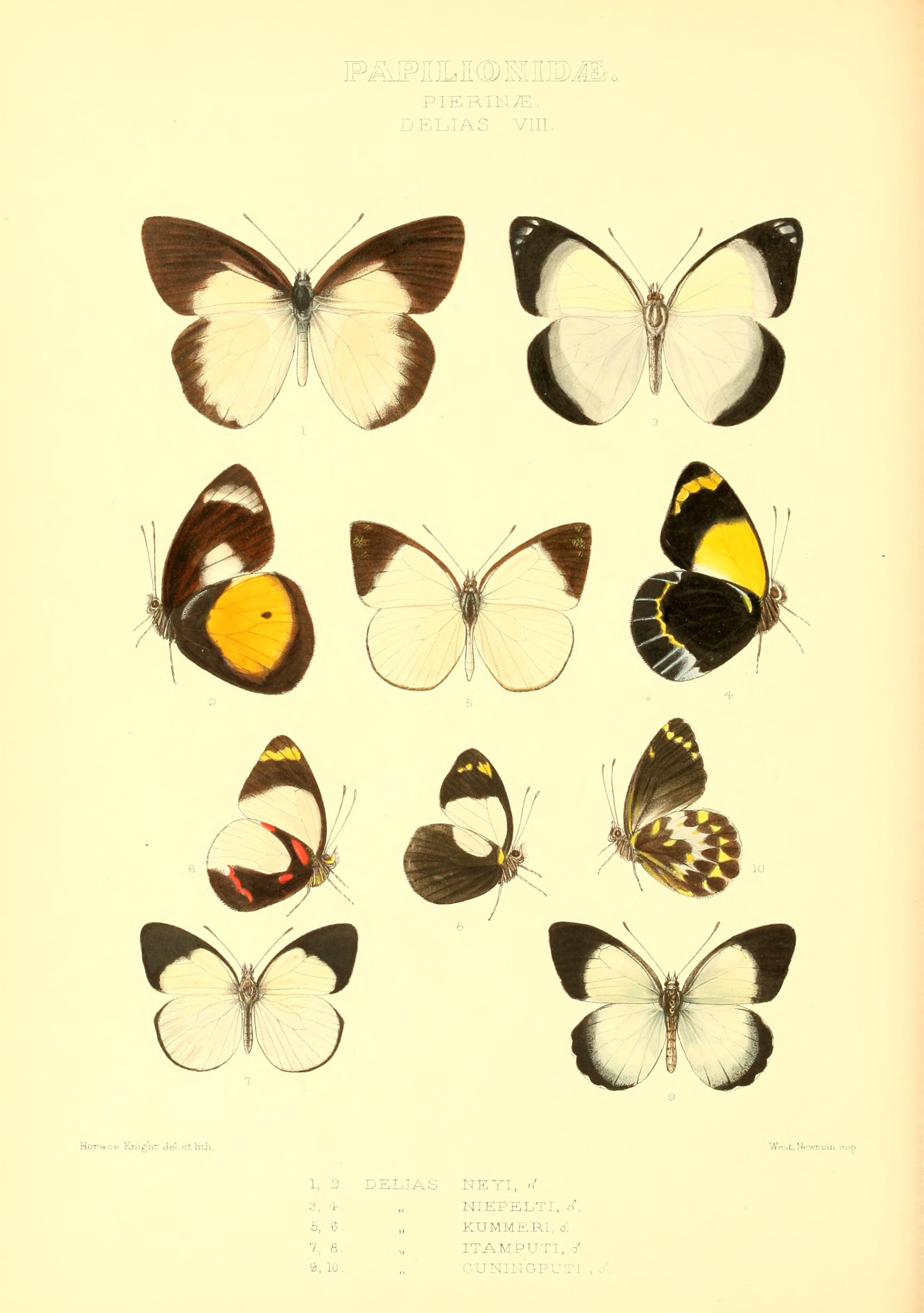
- Delias kummeri in Grose-Smith, H. & Kirby, W.F. (1887–1892) Rhopalocera exotica

Scientific classification
- Domain: Eukaryota
- Kingdom: Animalia
- Phylum: Arthropoda
- Class: Insecta
- Order: Lepidoptera
- Family: Pieridae
- Genus: Delias
- Species: D. kummeri

Binomial name
- Delias kummeri Ribbe, 1900

= Delias kummeri =

Species of butterfly

Delias kummeri is a butterfly in the family Pieridae. It was described by Carl Ribbe in 1900. It is found in New Guinea.

== Subspecies ==
- D. k. kummeri (Aroa River, Papua New Guinea)
- D. k. athena Yagishita, 1993 (Fakfak, Irian Jaya)
- D. k. chiekoae Nakano, 1995 (Mapia, Weyland Mountains, Irian Jaya)
- D. k. fumosa Roepke, 1955 (Araucaria River, Irian Jaya)
- D. k. highlandensis Yagishita, 1993 (Central Highlands, Papua New Guinea)
- D. k. rouffaer Yagishita, 1993 (Central Mountains, Irian Jaya)
- D. k. similis Talbot, 1928 (Arfak Mountains, Irian Jaya)
