= Mount Arfak =

Mountain in Indonesia

- Gunung Arfak
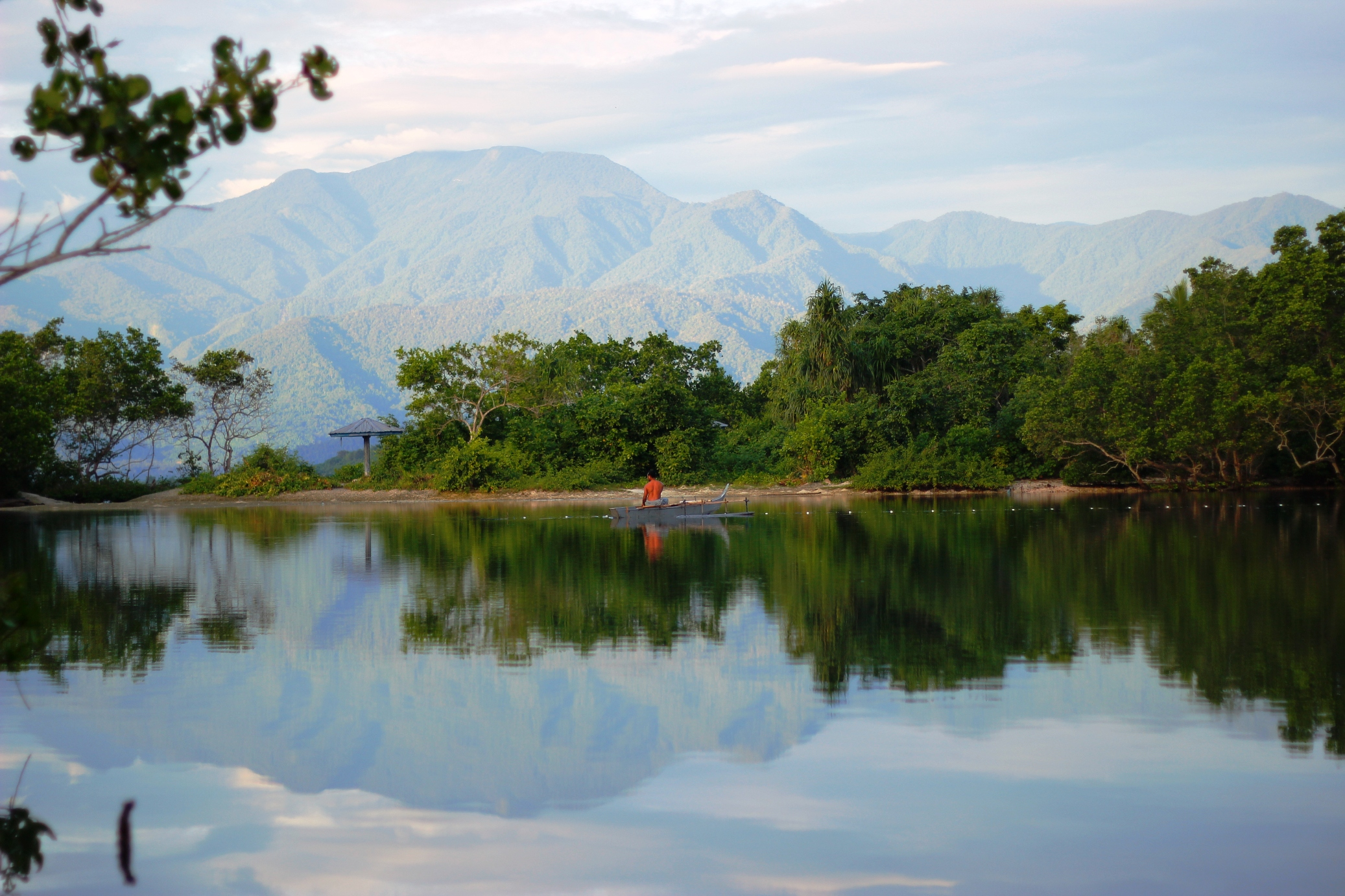
- As seen from a pond near the Rendani Airport.

Highest point
- Elevation: 2,955 m (9,695 ft)
- Prominence: 2,775 m (9,104 ft)
- Listing: Ultra; Ribu
- Coordinates: 1°09′23″S 133°58′47″E

Geography
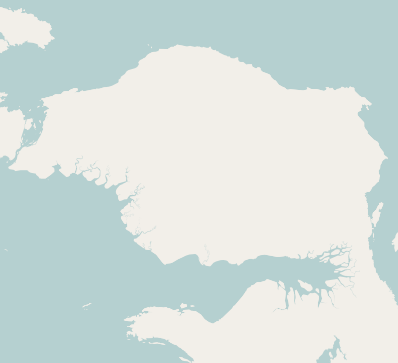
- Location within Bird's Head Peninsula Location within Indonesia
- Location: Bird's Head Peninsula, Manokwari Regency, Arfak Mountains Regency, West Papua, Indonesia
- Parent range: Arfak Mountains

Climbing
- Easiest route: Hike

Mount Arfak is the highest point in the province of West Papua. It is located on north-east side of the Bird's Head Peninsula. It is a popular hiking area and is the highest peak of the Arfak Mountains. From the summit, Manokwari can be seen. The summit of Mt. Arfak is temperate and dry with very hot, dry summer temperatures that average below 95 °F (35 °C) and mild, humid winter temperatures that average above 38 °F (3 °C). During the winter months, the mountain's summit receives frost usually and sometimes can get to 33 °F (0 °C) every now and then. Sometimes snow can fall on the summit, but not every year. Average rain amount per year is about 45 inches (1150 mm). The mountain is part of the Pegunungan Arfak Nature Reserve, a 683-square-kilometer (264 sq mi) protected area that protects parts of the Vogelkop montane rain forests ecoregion. The mountain is also the highest point in the Manokwari metropolitan area.

== Gallery ==
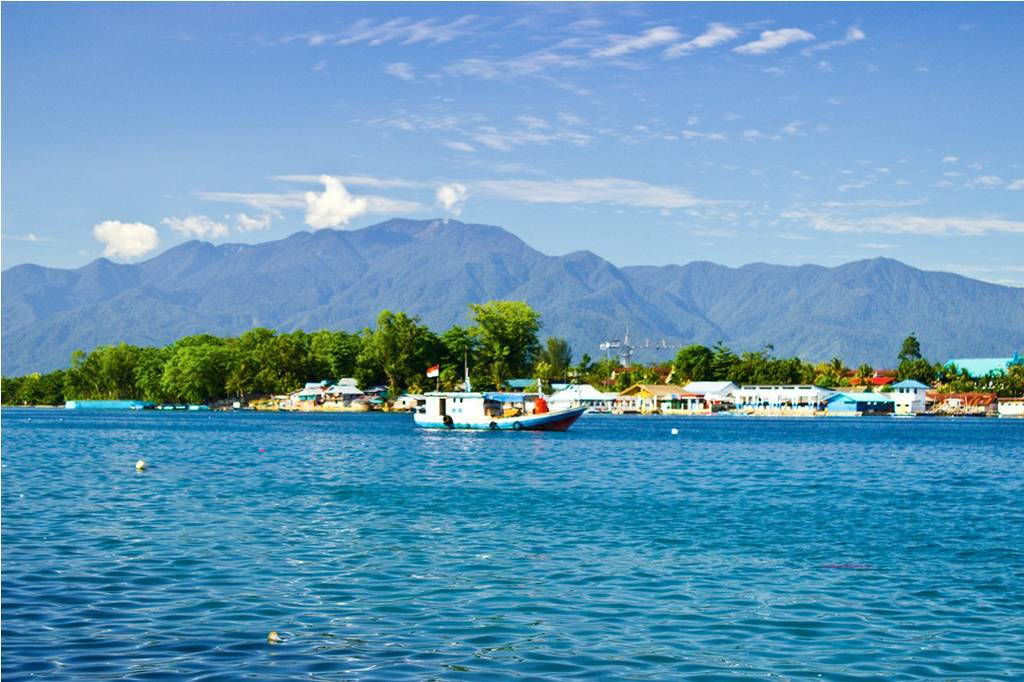
View from the Doreri Bay near Manokwari.

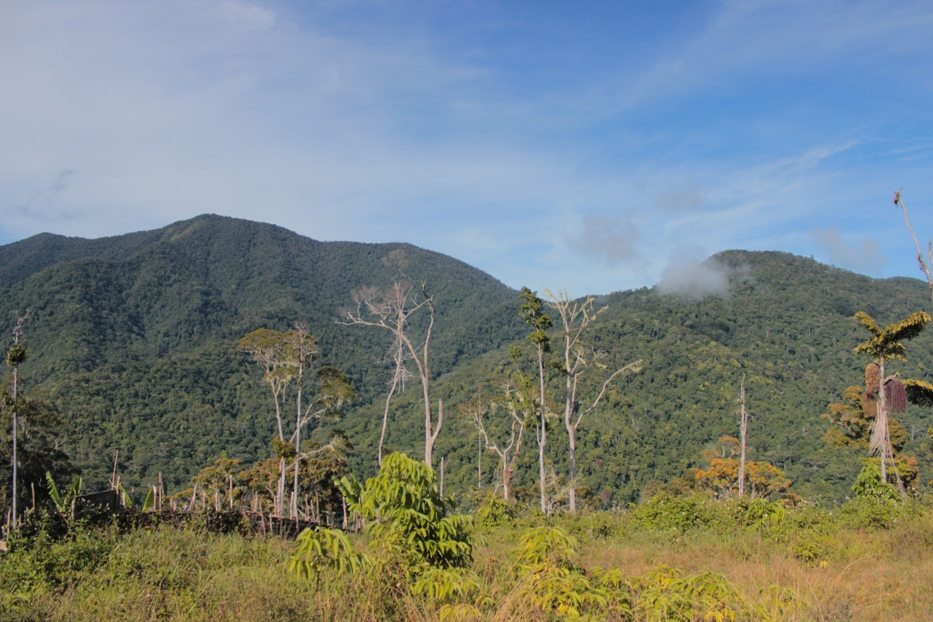
Closer view of the peak on the north-west side.

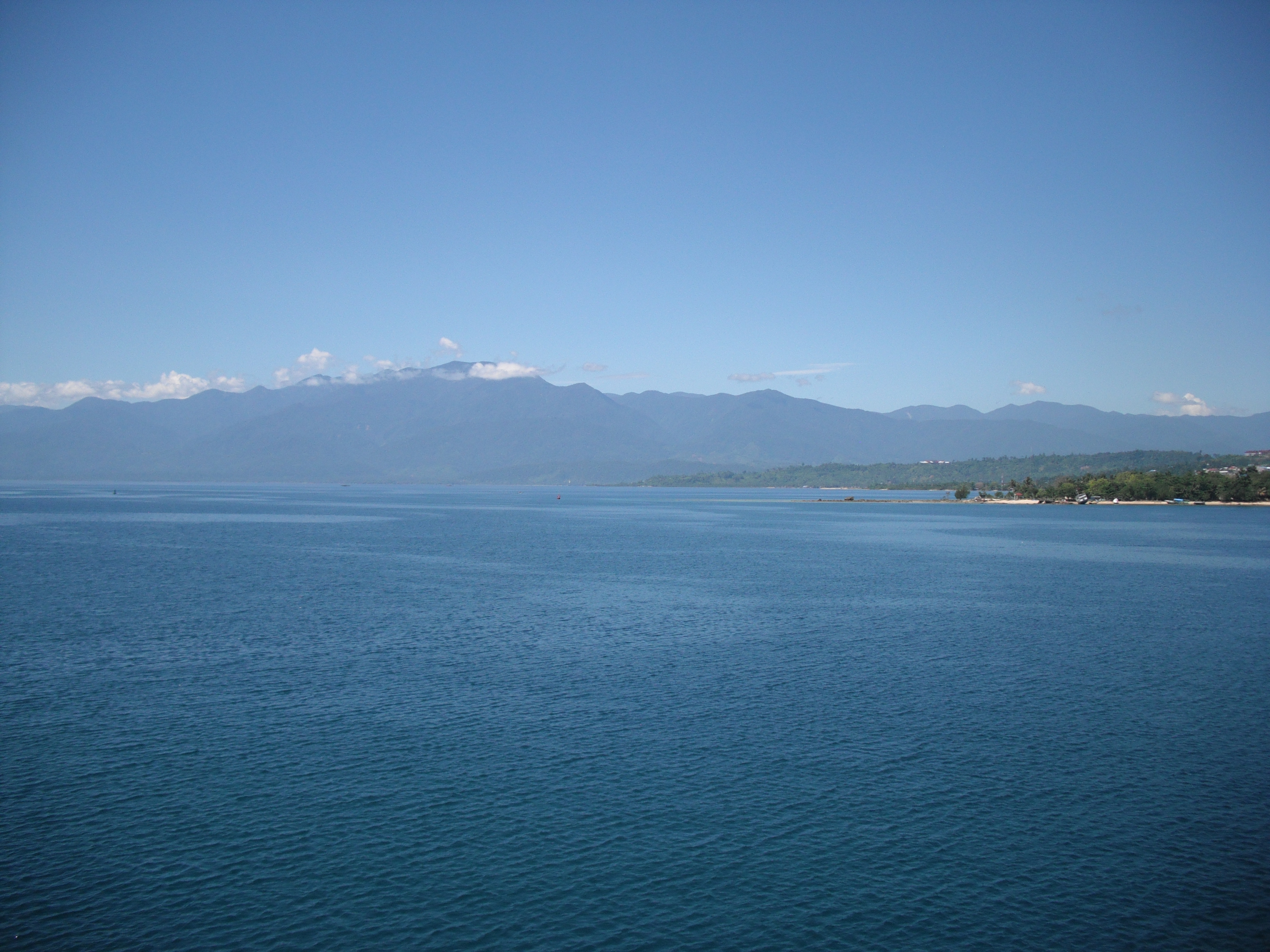
View of Pegunungan Arfak from the Cenderawasih Bay.

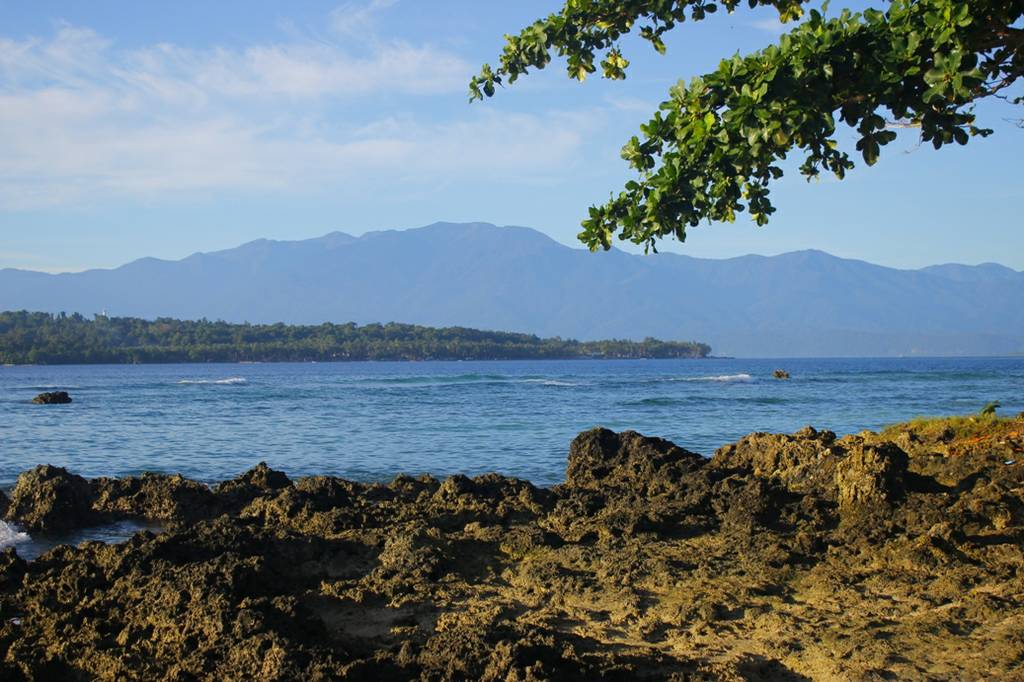
View of the mountain from a rocky beach near Manokwari

== See also ==
- List of Southeast Asian mountains
- List of ultras of the Malay Archipelago
- List of Ultras of Oceania
