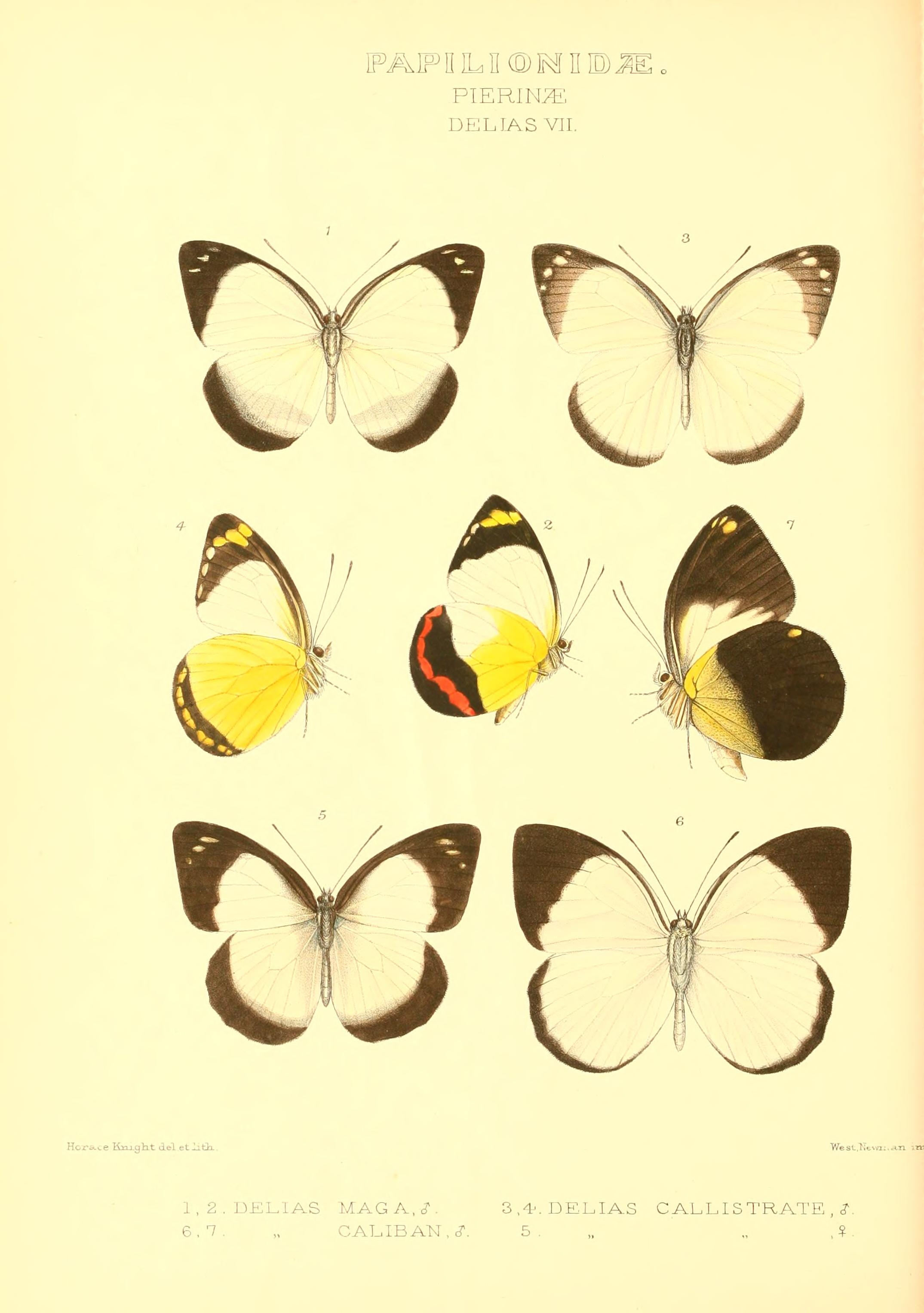

Scientific classification
- Kingdom: Animalia
- Phylum: Arthropoda
- Class: Insecta
- Order: Lepidoptera
- Family: Pieridae
- Genus: Delias
- Species: D. caliban

Binomial name
- Delias caliban Grose-Smith, 1897

= Delias caliban =

Species of butterfly

Delias caliban is a butterfly in the family Pieridae. It was described by Henley Grose-Smith in 1897. It is found in the Australasian realm where it is endemic to the D'Entrecasteaux Islands.

== Description ==
Male.— Upperside does not differ from D. ladas, Grose Smith.

Underside. Anterior wings differ from those of D. ladas in the black area being more extended, only the basal two thirds of the cell and the space below it to the inner margin being white, the white area extending obliquely: over the lower part of the disk, but ceasing on the inner margin before the outer angle. Posterior wings black, with the basal third densely irrorated with yellow scales from the costal margin at one third from the base, thence transversely across the cell to the inner margin a little above the anal angle; the yellow subapical spots on both wings are almost identical with those on the underside of D. ladas.

Expanse of wings 2 and 3/4 inches.

Hab. Fergusson Island (Meek).In the collection of the Hon. Walter Rothschild.

D. caliban is a much larger insect than D. ladas; the irrorated yellow basal area on the underside of the posterior wings is a very distinct feature, apart from other differences.. Two examples were in the collection.

== Subspecies ==
- D. c. caliban (Fergusson Island)
- D. c. satisbona Rothschild, 1915 (Goodenough Island)
