= Fly River water rat =

Conservation status
- Least Concern (IUCN 3.1)

Scientific classification
- Kingdom: Animalia
- Phylum: Chordata
- Class: Mammalia
- Order: Rodentia
- Family: Muridae
- Genus: Leptomys
- Species: L. signatus

Binomial name
- Leptomys signatus Tate & Archbold, 1938
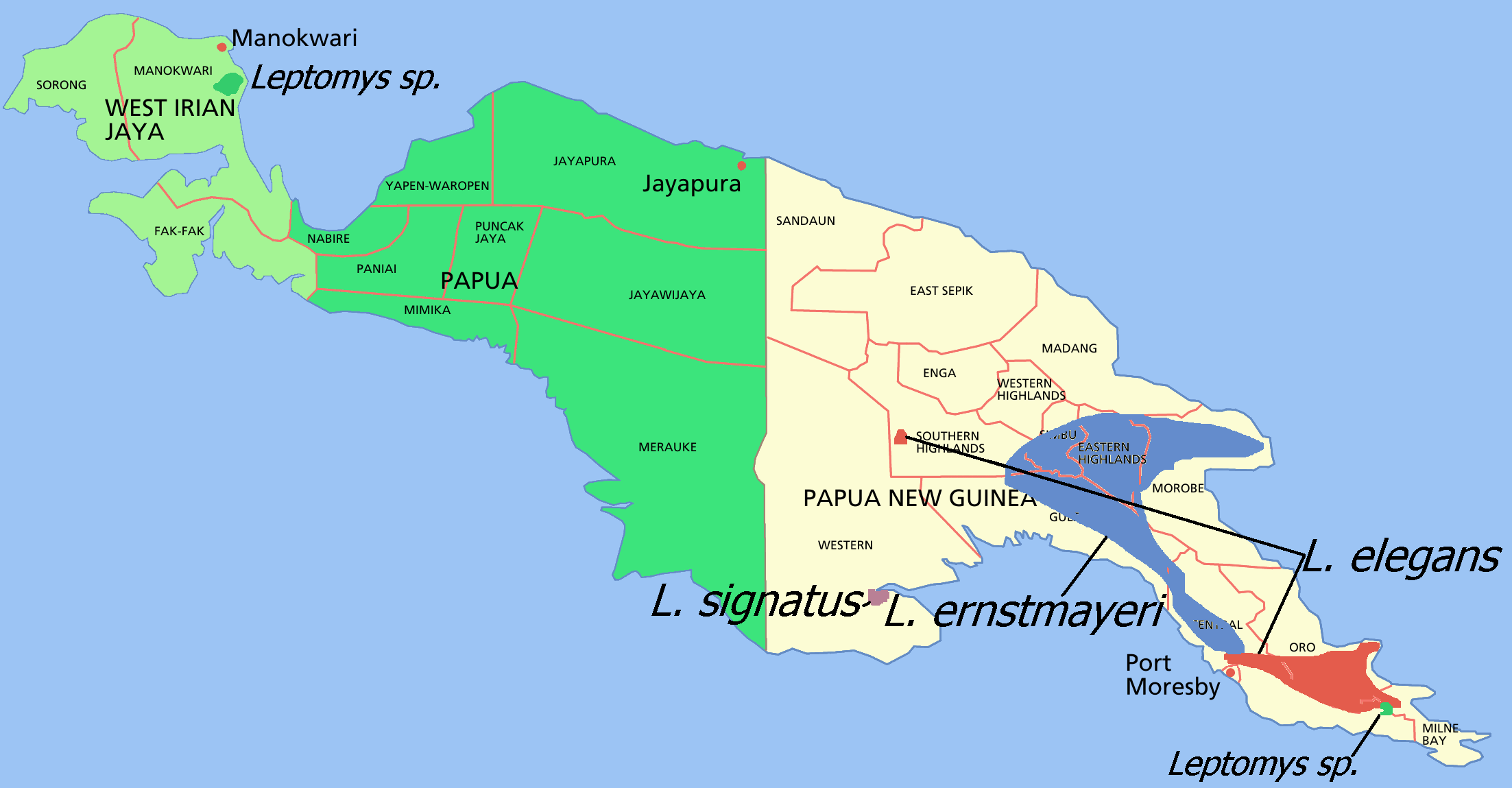
- Distribution map of L. signatus and other species of Leptomys on New Guinea: Leptomys signatus

Species of rodent

The Fly River water rat (Leptomys signatus) is a species of rodent in the family Muridae. It is found only in Papua New Guinea. Its natural habitat is subtropical or tropical dry forests. It is threatened by habitat loss.
