= Leptomys arfakensis =

Scientific classification
- Kingdom: Animalia
- Phylum: Chordata
- Class: Mammalia
- Order: Rodentia
- Family: Muridae
- Genus: Leptomys
- Species: L. arfakensis

Binomial name
- Leptomys arfakensis Musser, Helgen & Lunde, 2008

Species of rodent

Leptomys arfakensis is a species of rodent in the family of Muridae. It is found in the Arfak Mountains of West Papua, Indonesia.
