= Bird's Neck Isthmus =

Isthmus in western New Guinea

Location of the Bird's Neck Isthmus in Western New Guinea

The Bird's Neck Isthmus is an isthmus in western New Guinea. It connects the main mass of the island to its two large western peninsulas, the Bird's Head Peninsula, also known as the Vogelkop or Doberai Peninsula, and the Bomberai Peninsula. The isthmus is mostly covered in lowland tropical rain forest.

== Geography and geology ==
The isthmus is bounded by Cenderawasih Bay to the north, and the Arafura Sea to the south. The drainage divide is considerably closer to the north shore than to the south shore. The mountainous Wandammen Peninsula projects northwards from the isthmus into Cenderawasih Bay. Etna Bay, Triton Bay, and Arguni Bay are located on the southern coast of the isthmus, and Arguni Bay separates the isthmus from the Bomberai Peninsula.

Most of isthmus' terrain consists of ridges and valleys running north-northwest to west-northwest. This geologic region, whose surface rocks are mostly limestone, is known as the Lengguru Fold and Thrust Belt or Vogelkop Anticlines. This belt is approximately 300 km in length, and ranges from 30 km wide at its northern end to 100 km in width along the southern shore of the isthmus. The folding and faulting of the earth's crust which formed the belt began about 5 million years ago. The Lengguru Fold and Thrust Belt is bounded on the east by the Wandammen Ridge, which is composed of older (Paleozoic and Mesozoic) sedimentary and metamorphic rocks. To the west the fold and thrust belt transitions to the Bintuni Basin lowlands, which underlie most of the Bomberai Peninsula.

The fold and thrust belt's porous limestone and folded topography creates areas of karst landscape with irregular surface drainage and several large and seasonally fluctuating lakes. These include Lake Kurumoi (02°10' S, 134°5' E), Lake Laamora (03°41' S, 134°17' E), Lake Aiwaso (03°39' S, 134°16' E), and Lake Kamaka (03°43' S, 134°11' E).

The isthmus includes a gap in the chain of mountains that run almost continuously down the length of the island from the Bird's Head Peninsula to New Guinea's southeastern tip. This gap, known as the Omba-Woromi corridor, extends along the eastern side of the Wandammen Mountains and southeast of the fold and thrust belt, and is about 60 km wide with a maximum elevation of only 160 metres. It separates the Weyland Mountains, the westernmost portion of New Guinea's Central Range, from the uplands of the isthmus and the western peninsulas. Lake Yamur, or Jamur, is located in the corridor. The lake is drained by the Omba River, which follows the corridor southwards to empty into the Arafura Sea southeast of Etna Bay.

== Flora and fauna ==
The isthmus is covered in lowland rain forest. There is montane rain forest in the Wandammen Mountains above 1000 meters elevation.

The isthmus is a transition zone between some of New Guinea's main ecological regions. Ornithologists Jared Diamond, David Bishop, and Richard Sneider describe it as a 'double suture zone', where the avifaunas of New Guinea's northern lowlands and southern lowlands, which are otherwise separated by the Central Highlands, can mingle, as can the avifaunas of the western peninsulas and New Guinea's main mass.

Lake Yamur is home to wetland birds and waterfowl, as well as an endemic species of fish, the Yamur Lake grunter (Variichthys jamoerensis), and a population of bull shark (Carcharhinus leucas). Several lakes in the fold and thrust belt have endemic species of fish – Melanotaenia parva in Lake Kurumoi, Melanotaenia lakamora and Mogurnda magna in Lake Laamora, Melanotaenia lakamora and Mogurnda aiwasoensis in Lake Aiwaso, and Melanotaenia kamaka, Melanotaenia pierucciae, and Craterocephalus fistularis in or around Lake Kamaka.
