= Enarotali Nature Reserve =

Protected area in Indonesia

- IUCN category Ia (strict nature reserve)
- Interactive map of Enarotali Nature Reserve
- Location: Central Papua, Western New Guinea, Indonesia
- Coordinates: 3°51′50″S 136°12′30″E
- Area: 3,000 km^{2} (1,200 sq mi)
- Designation: Nature Reserve
- Governing body: Balai Besar Konservasi Sumber Daya Alam Papua

Enarotali Nature Reserve is a protected area in Central Papua Province of Western (Indonesian) New Guinea. It has an area of 3000 km^{2}.

The reserve is in New Guinea's Central Highlands. The western portion of the reserve covers the eastern end of the Weyland Mountains, and it abuts Weyland Mountains Nature Reserve. The center of the reserve surrounds, but does not include, the Paniai Lakes. The eastern portion of the reserve extends to the western end of the Sudirman Range. Most of the reserve is covered in montane rain forest.
