= Leptomys paulus =

Conservation status
- Data Deficient (IUCN 3.1)

Scientific classification
- Kingdom: Animalia
- Phylum: Chordata
- Class: Mammalia
- Order: Rodentia
- Family: Muridae
- Genus: Leptomys
- Species: L. paulus

Binomial name
- Leptomys paulus Musser, Helgen & Lunde, 2008

Species of rodent

Leptomys paulus is a small rodent belonging to the family Muridae endemic to New Guinea.

== Description ==
L. paulus has a head and body length of between 117 and 132 mm, and a tail length of between 138 and 163 mm. Its ears are 18 to 23 mm, dark brown in colour and have a few dark hairs, its feet are 31 to 36 mm . It can weigh up to 52 g. Its thick and soft fur is dark reddish brown on dorsal parts, yellowish on its sides and grayish white on the ventral parts. There is a hairless strip of skin that extends from the middle of the shoulders towards the forehead. It has long whiskers (60 mm) and white cheeks with a darker colour around the eyes. The tail is almost hairless with a white tip.

== Habitat ==
The species has been observed in the tropical low-montane regions of eastern New Guinea, between 1,240 and 1,540 m.
