= Wandammen Peninsula =

Peninsula in Western New Guinea

Pegunungan Wondiboy Nature Reserve
- Wondiboy Mountains Nature Reserve
- IUCN category Ia (strict nature reserve)
- Location within West Papua (province) Location within Western New Guinea
- Location: Teluk Wondama Regency, West Papua, Indonesia
- Coordinates: 2°36′0″S 134°34′30″E
- Area: 795 km^{2} (307 sq mi)
- Designation: Nature reserve
- Governing body: Balai Besar Konservasi Sumber Daya Alam Papua Barat
- Administrator: Wondama Bay Regency, West Papua province

The Wondiboy Peninsula, also known as the Wondiwoi, Wandammen (spelled locally Wandamen), Wondama, or in old sources Mandamy is a mountainous peninsula in Wondama Bay Regency, Western New Guinea. It extends northwards from the Bird's Neck Isthmus into Cenderawasih Bay, and is composed administratively of the Rasiei, Wondiboy, Wasior and Teluk Duairi Districts (kecamatan) within the regency. At the northern end of the peninsula the land breaks up into a series of islands which form Roon District, of which the largest is Roon Island.

Separate from the New Guinea Highlands, the mountain chain is northwest of the Kobowre Mountains summiting in Dogiyai Regency. These densely forested mountains run north and south along the spine of the peninsula, rising from the shore up to 2,250 metres elevation, and extending southwards into the Bird's Neck Isthmus. The eastern slope of the mountains is steeper than the western slope, and constitutes a thin coastal strip along the east coast of the peninsula which actually forms Teluk Umar District within Nabire Regency of Central Papua Province.

== Wildlife ==
Lowland rain forest covers the lower slopes of the range, with montane rain forest at higher elevations. Lowland forests extend from sea level to approximately 1000 metres elevation. Lower montane forests are dominated by Castanopsis acuminatissima and species of laurels. Southern beech (Nothofagus spp.) is predominant in upper montane forests, and the trees are often covered in mosses and other epiphytes.

Most of the Peninsula is covered by Pegunungan Wondiboy Nature Reserve, which covers an area of 795 km^{2} (307 sq mi).

== Etymology ==
The name Wandamen or Wondama comes from the Austronesian Wamesa language word Won meaning "people" and Dama meaning "come", so combined the word means, "the place where people come". Meanwhile Mandamy or Mandama comes from the Biak language with the same meaning.

== See also ==
- List of ultras of the Malay Archipelago
