= Kumawa Mountains =

Mountain range in Western New Guinea

- Pegunungan Kumawa
- Location within Western New Guinea

Highest point
- Elevation: 1,654 m (5,427 ft)

Geography
- Location: New Guinea
- Country: Indonesia
- Province: West Papua
- Range coordinates: 3°50′13″S 132°54′42″E

The Kumawa Mountains are a mountain range in Western New Guinea. The Kumawa Mountains are a coastal range located on the southwestern Bomberai Peninsula. They are in West Papua Province in the Indonesian portion of New Guinea.

Much of the range is composed of limestone. Rainwater eroding the limestone has created large areas of karst landscape, with caverns, sinkholes, and relatively few surface streams despite high rainfall.

The mountains have a humid tropical climate, with cooler temperatures and higher rainfall at higher elevations.

The mountains are covered in tropical rain forest. Typical lowland rain forest trees are Alstonia scholaris, Burckella sp., Calophyllum sp., Cananga odorata, Canarium indicum, Falcataria falcata, Intsia bijuga, Intsia palembanica, Palaquium sp., Planchonella sp., Pometia pinnata, Spondias cytherea, and Terminalia sp. Common montane rain forest species in karstic areas are Anisoptera polyandra, Casuarina sp., Elaeocarpus sp., Intsia sp., Octomeles sumatrana, Palaquium sp., Podocarpus idenburgensis, and Spondias dulcis. Agathis labillardierei and Araucaria cunninghamii grow in moister, non-karstic areas of the mountains and Araucaria cunninghamii grows on ridges.

A nature reserve, called Pegunungan Kumawa Nature Reserve or Kumawa Mountains Nature Reserve, protects a portion of the range. It has an area of 1881.5 km^{2}.
