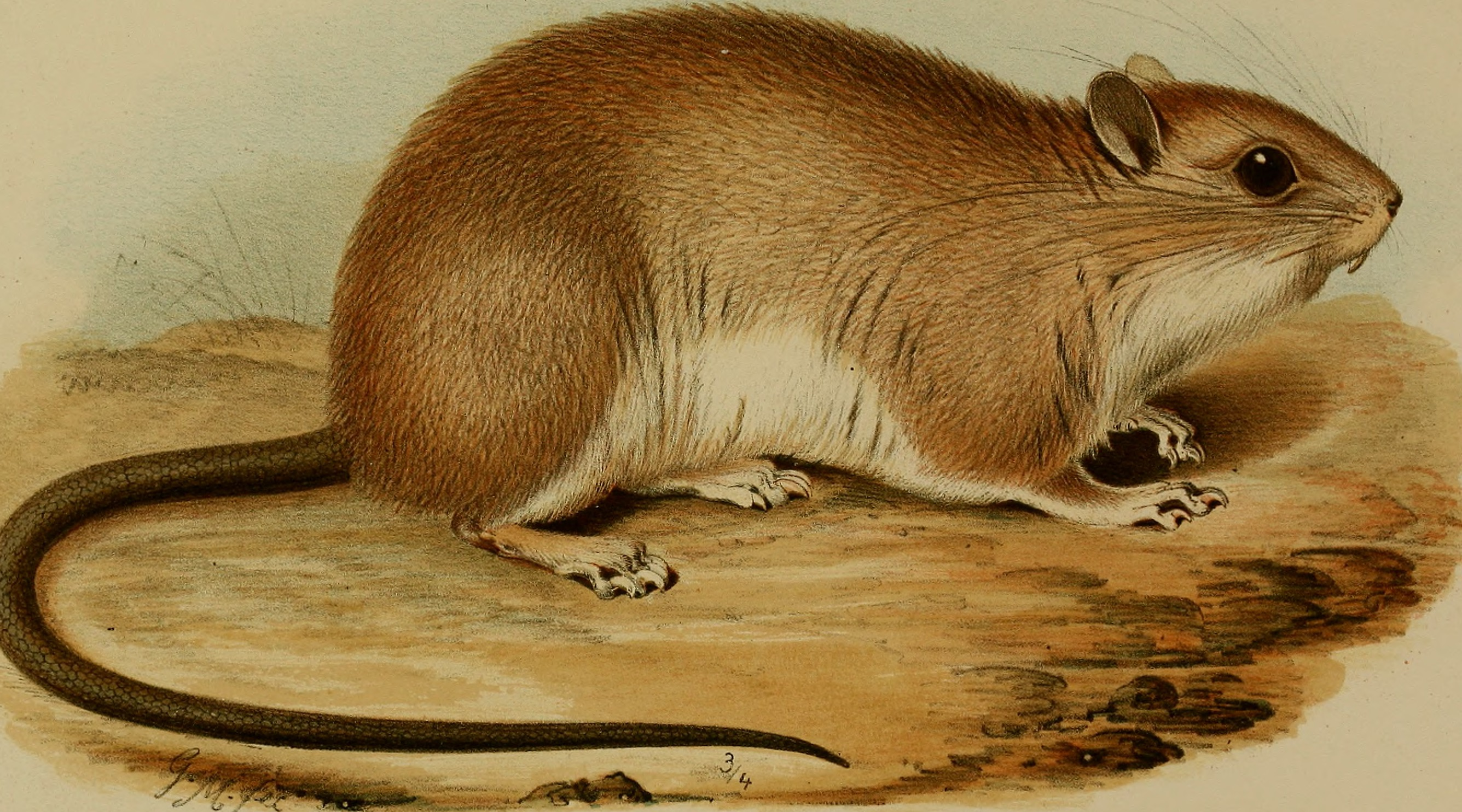
- Lowland brush mouse (Pogonomelomys bruijni)

Scientific classification
- Domain: Eukaryota
- Kingdom: Animalia
- Phylum: Chordata
- Class: Mammalia
- Order: Rodentia
- Family: Muridae
- Subfamily: Murinae
- Tribe: Hydromyini
- Genus: Pogonomelomys; Rümmler, 1936

Type species
- Melomys mayeri

Species
- Pogonomelomys bruijni Pogonomelomys mayeri

= Pogonomelomys =

Genus of rodents

Pogonomelomys is a genus of rodent in the family Muridae endemic to New Guinea and nearby islands. It contains the following species:

- Grey pogonomelomys (Pogonomelomys brassi)
- Lowland brush mouse (Pogonomelomys bruijni)
- Shaw Mayer's brush mouse (Pogonomelomys mayeri)
