= Leptomys =

Scientific classification
- Domain: Eukaryota
- Kingdom: Animalia
- Phylum: Chordata
- Class: Mammalia
- Order: Rodentia
- Family: Muridae
- Subfamily: Murinae
- Tribe: Hydromyini
- Genus: Leptomys; Thomas, 1897

Type species
- Leptomys elegans

Species
- 5, see text
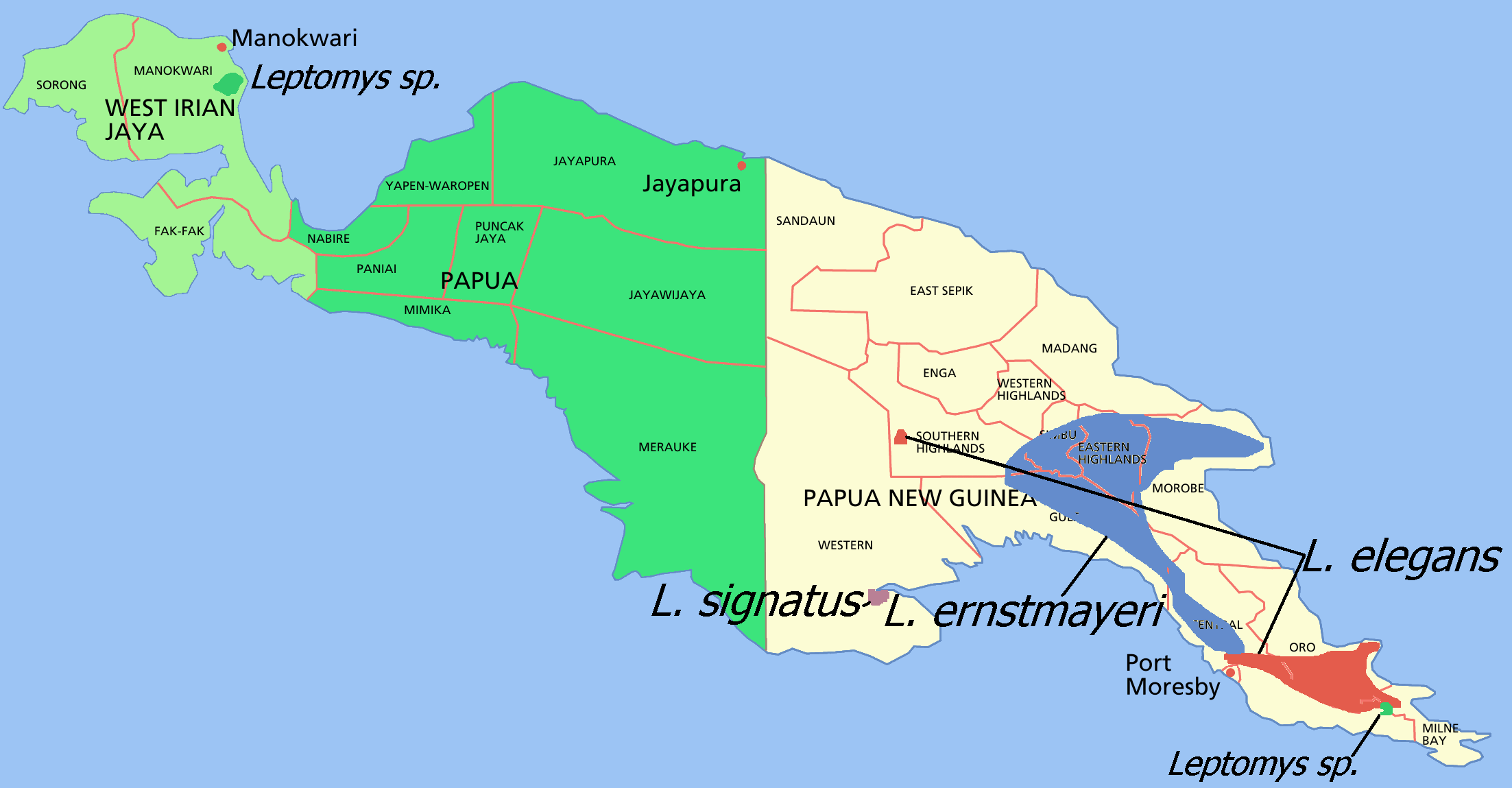
- Distribution map of species of Leptomys on New Guinea

Genus of rodents

Leptomys is a genus of rodent endemic to New Guinea. It is considered part of the New Guinea Old Endemics, meaning it was part of the first wave of murine rodents to colonize the island. Leptomys are seen to have minimal adaptations to their aquatic life style. Elongated hind feet accompanied by elongated centre toes suggest the ability to leap. The third molar which is lost is many rodents is retained, albeit smaller. Small eyes and ears can be seen amongst its velvety soft fur.

== Species ==
- Leptomys arfakensis Musser, Helgen & Lunde, 2008
- Long-footed water rat, Leptomys elegans
- Ernst Mayr's water rat, Leptomys ernstmayri
- Leptomys paulus Musser, Helgen & Lunde, 2008
- Fly River water rat, Leptomys signatus
