= Grey pogonomelomys =

Conservation status
- Least Concern (IUCN 3.1)

Scientific classification
- Kingdom: Animalia
- Phylum: Chordata
- Class: Mammalia
- Order: Rodentia
- Family: Muridae
- Genus: Pogonomelomys
- Species: P. brassi

Binomial name
- Pogonomelomys brassi Tate & Archbold, 1941

Species of rodent

The grey pogonomelomys (Pogonomelomys brassi) is a species of rodent in the family Muridae. It is found in Indonesia and Papua New Guinea.

== Taxonomy ==
This species was formerly included as a subspecies of Pogonomelomys bruijnii (Lowland brush mouse).
