= Ernst Mayr's water rat =

Conservation status
- Least Concern (IUCN 3.1)

Scientific classification
- Kingdom: Animalia
- Phylum: Chordata
- Class: Mammalia
- Order: Rodentia
- Family: Muridae
- Genus: Leptomys
- Species: L. ernstmayri

Binomial name
- Leptomys ernstmayri Rümmler, 1932
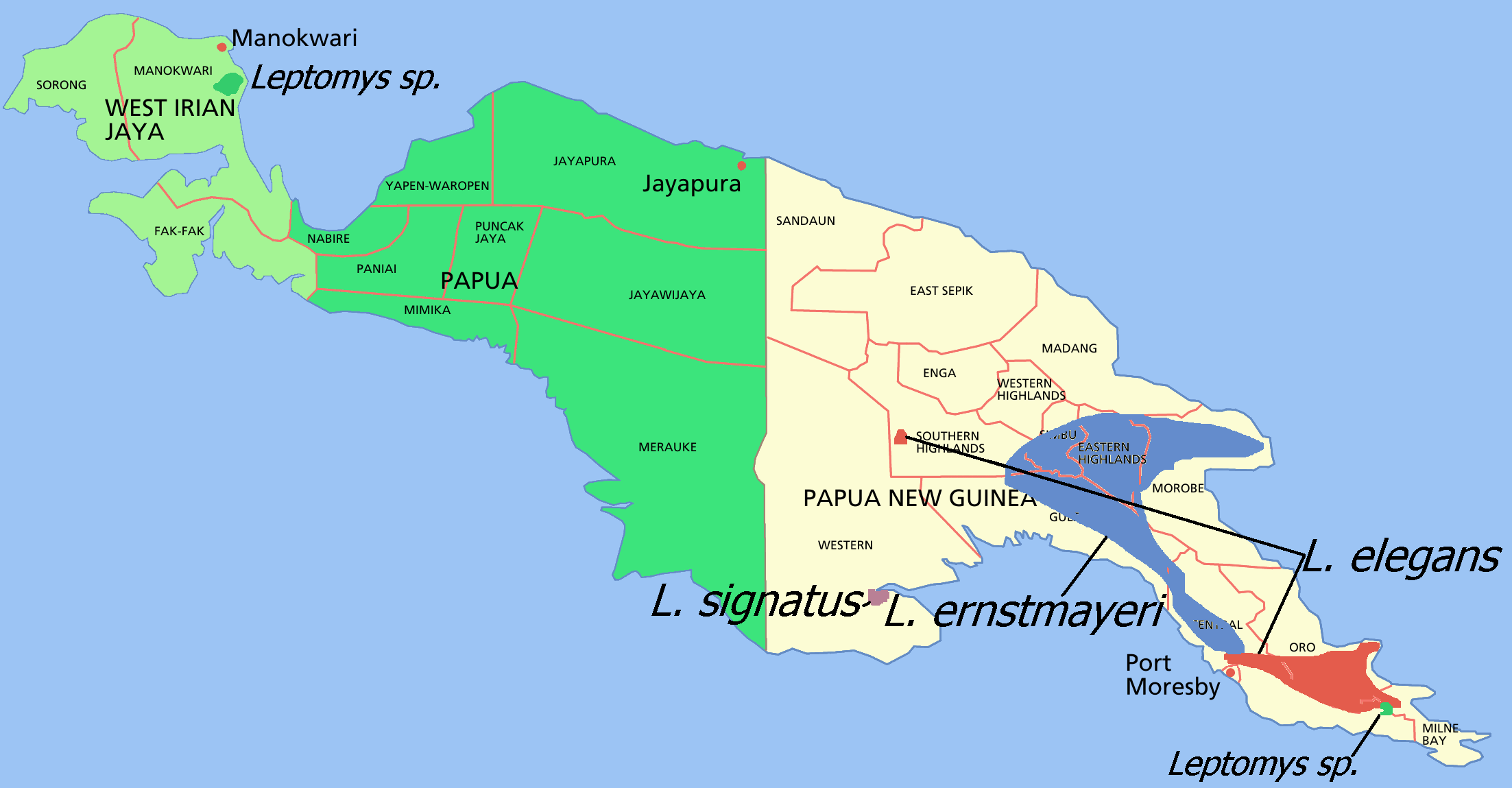
- Distribution map of L. ernstmayri and other species of Leptomys on New Guinea: Leptomys ernstmayri

Species of rodent

Ernst Mayr's water rat (Leptomys ernstmayri) is a species of rodent in the family Muridae, named for evolutionary biologist Ernst Mayr. It is found in the Foja Mountains of Papua Province, Indonesia, and in the mountains of northeastern Papua New Guinea.
