= Long-footed water rat =

Conservation status
- Least Concern (IUCN 3.1)

Scientific classification
- Kingdom: Animalia
- Phylum: Chordata
- Class: Mammalia
- Order: Rodentia
- Family: Muridae
- Genus: Leptomys
- Species: L. elegans

Binomial name
- Leptomys elegans Thomas, 1897
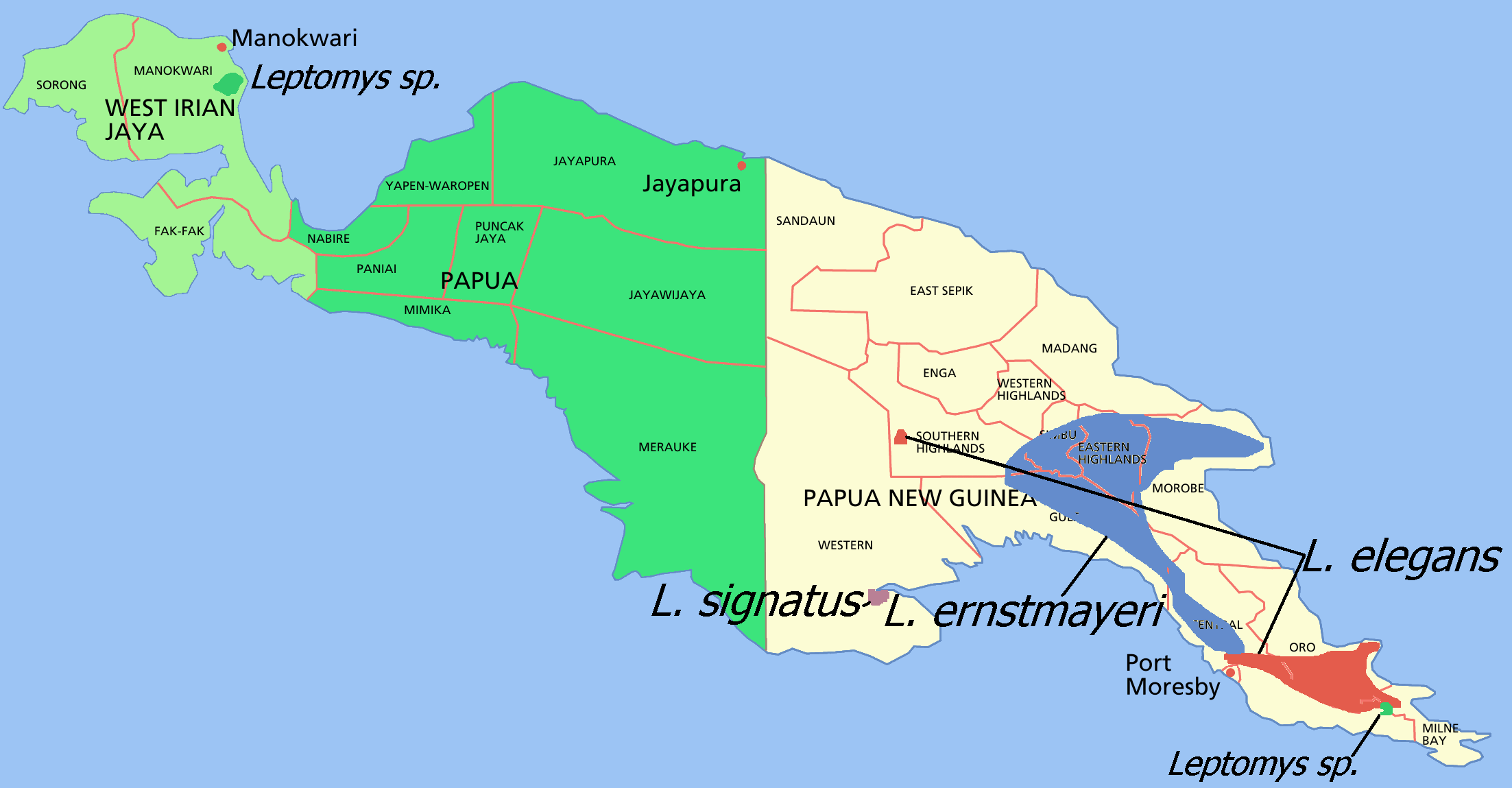
- Distribution map of L. elegans and other species of Leptomys on New Guinea: Leptomys elegans

Species of rodent

The long-footed water rat (Leptomys elegans) is a species of rodent in the family Muridae. It is found in the mountains of southern Papua New Guinea. Its natural habitat is subtropical or tropical dry forest.

== Distribution and habitat ==
The long-footed water rat is endemic to the eastern half of the island of New Guinea. Its range includes the Owen Stanley Range, Mount Dayman, Mount Sisa, and Mount Victory in Papua New Guinea, and its altitudinal range extends from 400 to 1,600 m (1,300 to 5,200 ft). Relatively few specimens of this rat have been observed, and its habitat includes secondary forest and old gardens, and it is presumed to be also present in primary forest.

== Status ==
No particular threats are known for this species. It is sometimes hunted, presumably for food, but this is unlikely to be of much significance to the species. Previously classified as "critically endangered", the long-footed water rat has been found to have a much wider distribution and to be more plentiful than was once thought and has been reclassified as "least concern".
