= Arfak Reserve =

Nature Reserve

Pegunungan Arfak Nature Reserve
- Arfak Reserve
- IUCN category IV (habitat/species management area)
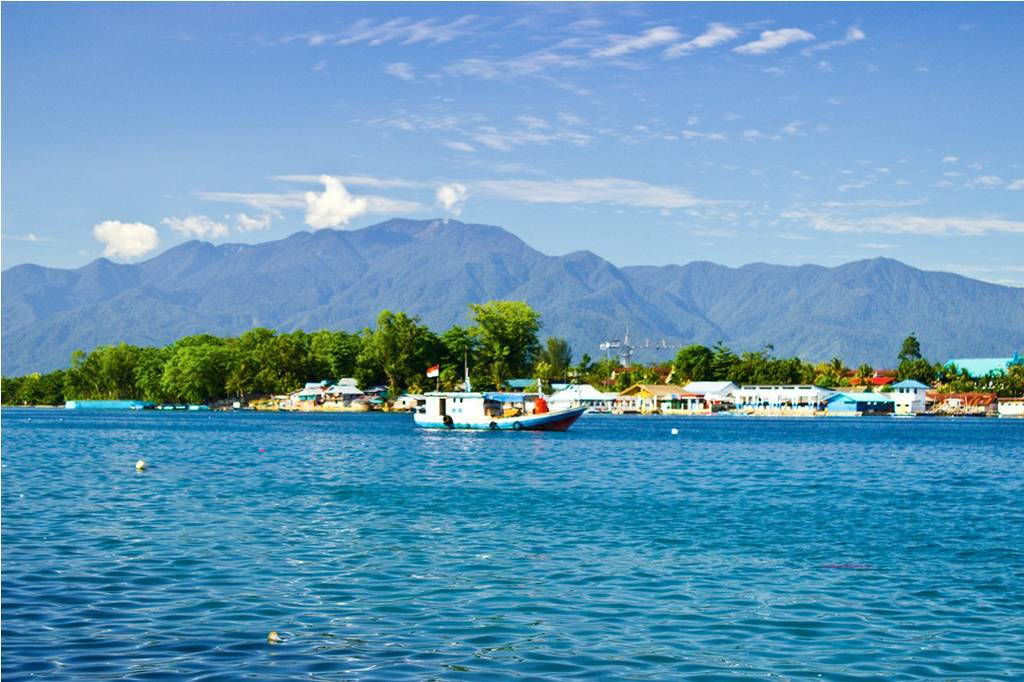

- Location within Indonesia
- Location: West Papua, Indonesia
- Nearest city: Manokwari
- Coordinates: 1.294°S 134.132°E
- Area: 683 km^{2} (264 mi^{2})

The Pegunungan Arfak Nature Reserve lies in the north-east corner of the Bird's Head Peninsula in the Indonesian province of West Papua. It is located 25 km south of the provincial capital Manokwari. It spans from near the coast up to the highest point in the province, Pegunungan Arfak, at 2,955 m (9,695 ft).

Vegetation includes lowland, hill, and montane rainforest (the latter includes oaks, chestnuts, and southern beeches). Logging occurs in the lowland and hill forests. Endemic, rare, and commercially important mammal species are protected. Surveys indicate 110 species of mammals, of which twenty-one are endemic to the island of New Guinea tree kangaroos, forest wallabies, bandicoots, possums, and cuscus. There are twenty-seven species of rodent, of which seventeen are endemic to the island. 320 bird species have been recorded in the reserve of which about half are endemic to New Guinea. The Rothchild's Birdwing is an insect only known from the Arfak Mountains.

Anggi Giji and Gita are two lakes located high in the mountains and further adorn this landscape. Over time, this reserve becomes an interesting gathering place for domestic and foreign researchers.
