= Shaw Mayer's brush mouse =

Conservation status
- Least Concern (IUCN 3.1)

Scientific classification
- Kingdom: Animalia
- Phylum: Chordata
- Class: Mammalia
- Order: Rodentia
- Family: Muridae
- Genus: Pogonomelomys
- Species: P. mayeri

Binomial name
- Pogonomelomys mayeri (Rothschild & Dollman, 1932)

Species of rodent

Shaw Mayer's brush mouse (Pogonomelomys mayeri) is a species of rodent in the family Muridae. It is found in West Papua, Indonesia and Papua New Guinea.
