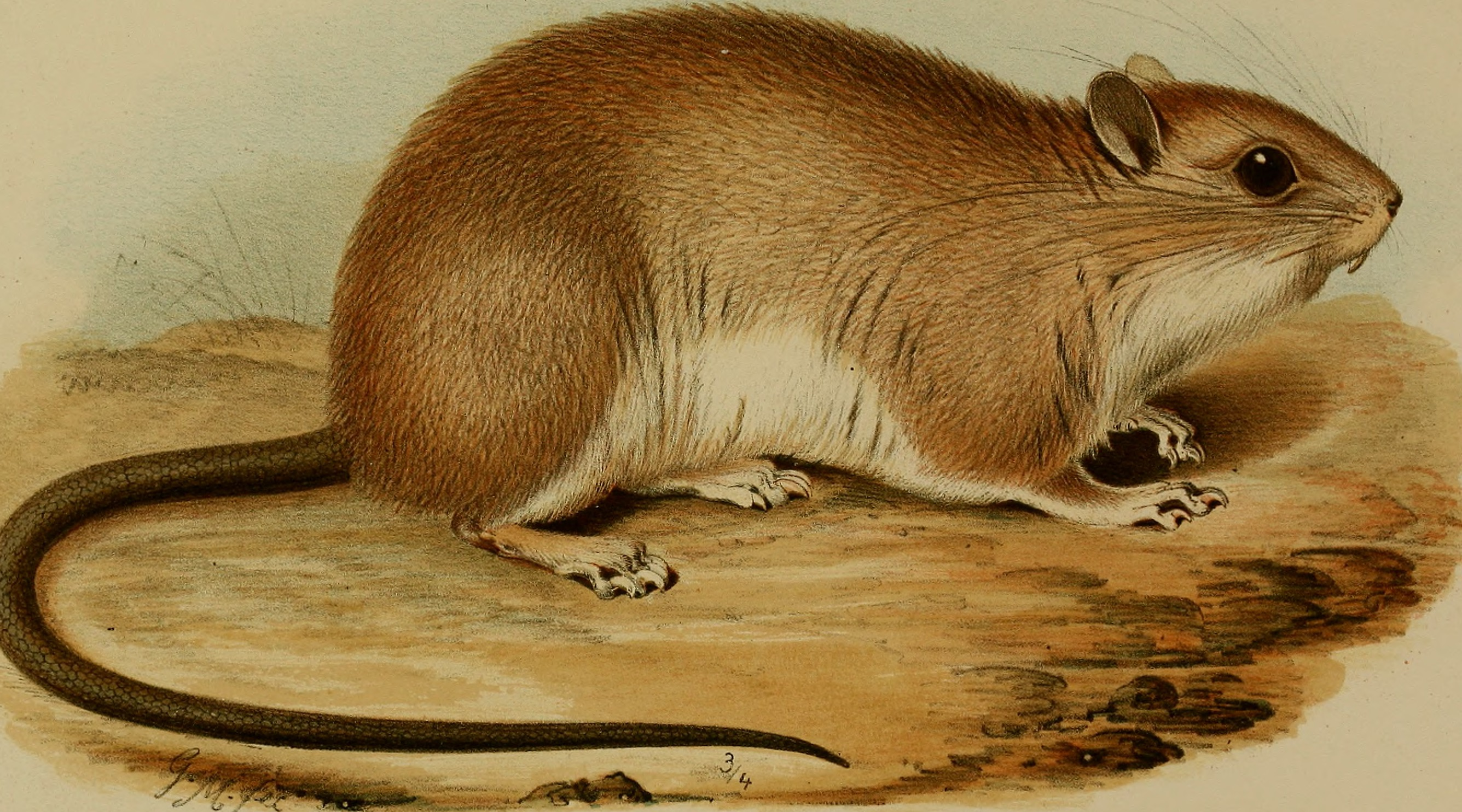

Conservation status
- Least Concern (IUCN 3.1)

Scientific classification
- Kingdom: Animalia
- Phylum: Chordata
- Class: Mammalia
- Order: Rodentia
- Family: Muridae
- Genus: Pogonomelomys
- Species: P. bruijni

Binomial name
- Pogonomelomys bruijni (Peters & Doria, 1876)

= Lowland brush mouse =

Species of rodent

The lowland brush mouse (Pogonomelomys bruijni) is a species of rodent in the family Muridae. It is found in Indonesia on the island of Salawati and on the Vogelkop Peninsula in Papua Province, Indonesia.

== Taxonomy ==
The grey pogonomelomys (Pogonomelomys brassi) was formerly included under this species.

== Ecology ==
The lowland brush mouse is an arboreal rodent and lives in holes in trees.

== Status ==
The tropical humid forests in which this mouse lives are increasingly being cleared to make way for agriculture and this must be affecting the species. Previously classified as "critically endangered", the lowland brush mouse has been found to be more plentiful than was once thought and has been reclassified as "near threatened".
