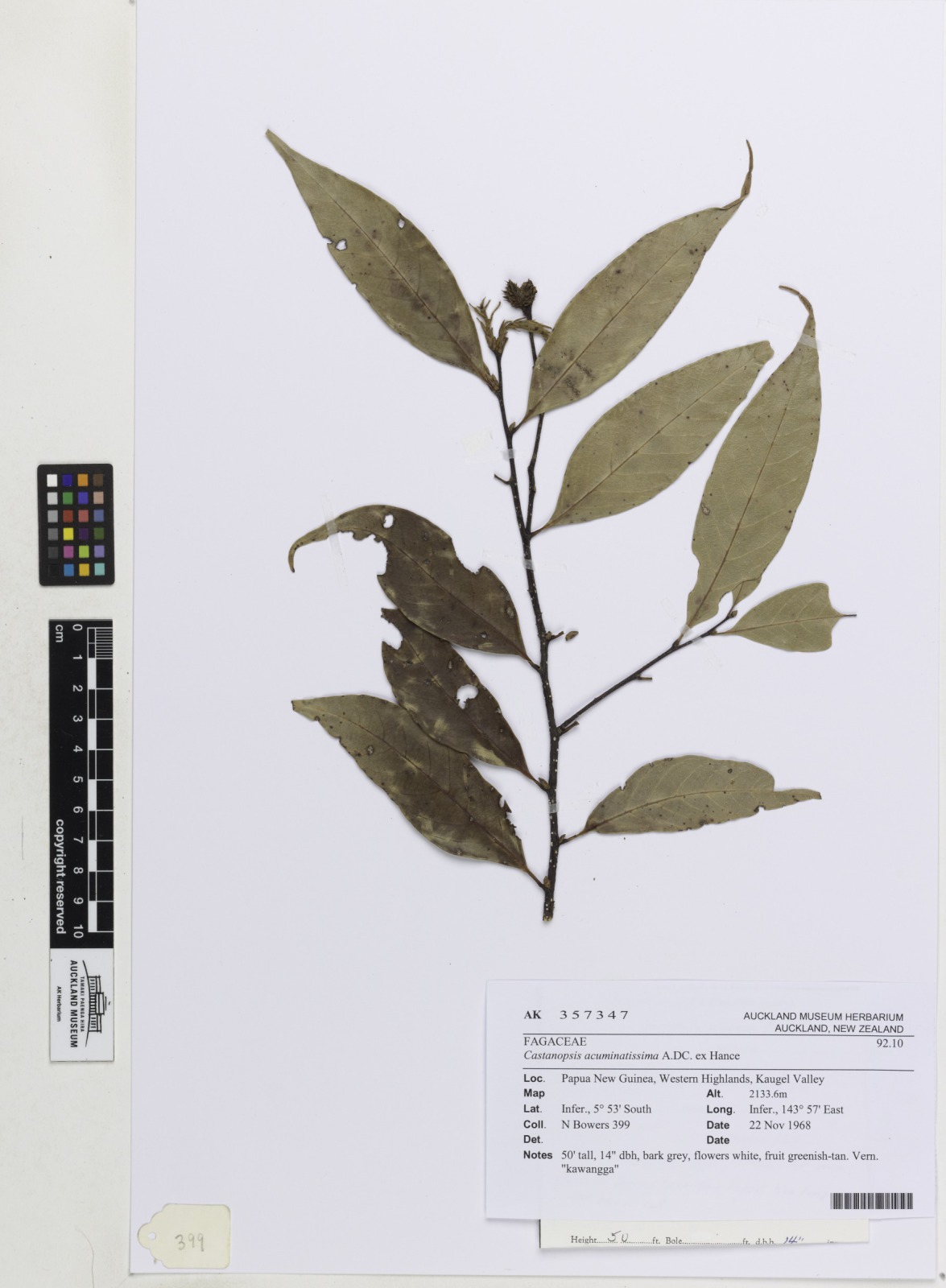

Conservation status
- Least Concern (IUCN 3.1)

Scientific classification
- Kingdom: Plantae
- Clade: Tracheophytes
- Clade: Angiosperms
- Clade: Eudicots
- Clade: Rosids
- Order: Fagales
- Family: Fagaceae
- Genus: Castanopsis
- Species: C. acuminatissima

Binomial name
- Castanopsis acuminatissima (Blume) A.DC.

Synonyms
- Castanea acuminatissima Blume; Quercus junghuhnii Miq.

= Castanopsis acuminatissima =

Species of tree

Castanopsis acuminatissima is an evergreen tree native to Southeast Asia and New Guinea. It is known by a variety of common names over its range, including white oak, New Guinea oak, Papua New Guinea oak, ki riung, ko-duai, ko-soi, ko-mat, meranak, and riung anak.

== Description ==
Castanopsis acuminatissima is a large canopy tree, up to 40 meters in height. The trunk is markedly fluted, and sometimes buttressed. The bark is grey or pale brown, rough and fissured, less than 25 mm thick, with red under-bark.

Leaves are simple, 9.0-11.5 cm long and 2.5-3.5 cm wide, and arranged spirally along the branches. Fruits are simple nuts, 1–10 mm in diameter.

== Distribution and habitat ==
Castanopsis acuminatissima ranges from southwestern China (Guizhou and Yunnan provinces) through Indochina (Laos, Myanmar, Thailand, Vietnam, and the Chittagong Hills of Bangladesh) and Malesia (Malaysia; the islands of Sulawesi, Java, Kalimantan, and Sumatra, in Indonesia; the islands of New Guinea (West Papua in Indonesia and Papua New Guinea) and New Britain (Papua New Guinea).

== Habitat and ecology ==
Castanopsis acuminatissima is native to lowland dipterocarp rain forests and montane rain forests from 300 up to 2,500 meters elevation.

In New Guinea and New Britain, it is a predominant tree in the lower montane forests, lying between 900-1000 and 2000 meters elevation. It can also be found at lower elevations on small-crowned hill forests, in association with Hopea papuana and the drought-tolerant Casuarina papuana.
