= Weyland Mountains =

Mountain range in Western New Guinea

- Pegunungan Kobowre, Pegunungan Robooere
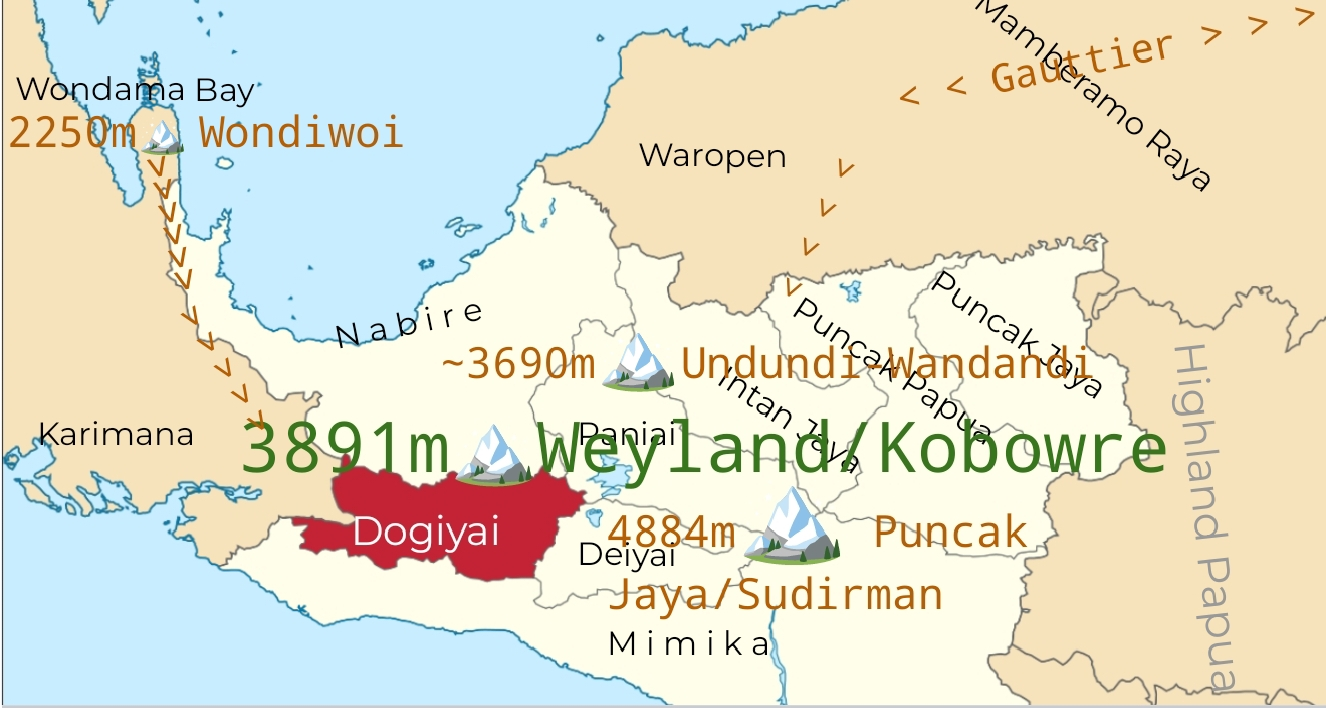
- Map of regencies of Central Papua highlighting the Weyland Mountains

Highest point
- Elevation: 3,891 m (12,766 ft)
- Prominence: 2,215 m (7,267 ft)
- Listing: Ultra, Ribu

Geography
- Location within Western New Guinea
- Location: New Guinea
- Country: Indonesia
- Province: Dogiyai Regency, Central Papua
- Range coordinates: 3°51′31″S 135°50′20″E

The Weyland Mountains, also known as the Kobowre Mountains, are a mountain chain in Western New Guinea. The Weyland Mountains are the westernmost mountains in New Guinea's Central Range, which extends eastwards to the island's southeastern tip. Rising up to 3891 m, it is the highest point of Dogiyai Regency, Central Papua, Indonesia. The mountains are located within Dogiyai and Nabire Regencies, along with Karimana Regency in West Papua province.

== Geography ==
The Weyland Mountains include several high peaks reaching up to 3891 metres elevation. They are surrounded by lower-elevation areas. To the west, a low pass at only 160 metres in elevation separates the Weylands from the highlands of the Bird's Neck Isthmus and New Guinea's western peninsulas. To the north and south, they descend to New Guinea's northern and southern lowlands. To the east, a valley containing the Paniai Lakes—Paniai, Tigi, and Tage, also known as the Wissel Lakes—separates the Weyland Mountains from the Snow Mountains, or Sudirman Mountains, farther east. Higher peaks such as Puncak Jaya are located to the east.

== Wildlife ==
The Weyland Mountains Nature Reserve, also known as Pegunungan Wayland Nature Reserve, protects the central portion of the range and covers an area of 2230.0 km^{2}. The Enarotali Nature Reserve covers the eastern end of the range. The Weyland Mountains support a tropical montane forest ecosystem, inhabited by various perching birds, small mammals, squamata reptiles, and amphibians.

== See also ==
- List of ultras of the Malay Archipelago
