= Arfak Mountains =

Mountain range in Indonesia

Coordinates: 1°10′21″S 133°29′31″E

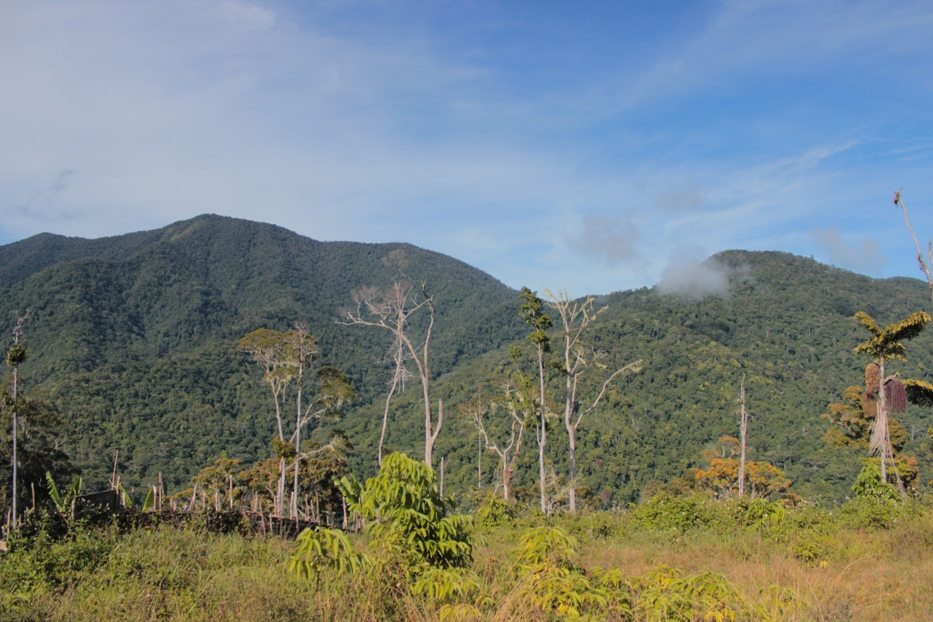
- View of the Arfak Mountains from a broadleaf forest.

Highest point
- Peak: Mount Arfak
- Elevation: 2,955 m (9,695 ft)

Geography
- Location: Manokwari Regency, Arfak Mountains Regency, Tambrauw Regency, South Manokwari Regency, Teluk Bintuni Regency, West Papua
- Country: Indonesia

Geology
- Orogenies: Mesozoic and Paleozoic
- Rock types: sandstone, igneous and limestone

The Arfak Mountains (Indonesian: Pegunungan Arfak) is a mountain range found on the Bird's Head Peninsula in the Province of West Papua, Indonesia.

The term "arfak" came from arfk, a term in the language of the coastal Biak people meaning "people who sleep over fire", to refer to how the Arfak warm their houses by putting hot ember below their Rumah Kaki Seribu. Locally the mountain is called "Gunung Indon" or "Indonga" meaning "big mountain" in Hatam language. Located in the east and central regions of the Bird's Head Peninsula, these mountains rise steeply from the sea, with little or no coastal plain surrounding them. Mount Arfak, at 2,955 m (9,695 ft), can be viewed from the provincial capital, Manokwari, and is the highest point in West Papua and the Bird's Head Peninsula.

Since Dutch colonial times the range has been one of the most frequently explored and best known regions of West Papua for bird watching. Along with the Tamrau Mountains in the north, the two ranges have been divided by the grassy Kebar Valley, which is the heartland of many indigenous people, with a variety of backgrounds. Found near the town of Manokwari, the mountains are an important and threatened site of biodiversity, part of the Vogelkop montane rain forests ecoregion. Multiple tribes of indigenous peoples, many who speak mutually unintelligible languages such as Hatam, Meyah and Sougb, all call the Arfak Mountains their home. They ultimately are the guardians of the future of the exquisite, yet increasingly threatened bird species found throughout this rugged region.
