= List of ecoregions in Papua New Guinea =

The following is a list of ecoregions in Papua New Guinea, as identified by the Worldwide Fund for Nature (WWF).

== Terrestrial ecoregions ==
Papua New Guinea is in the Australasian realm. Ecoregions are listed by biome.

=== Tropical and subtropical moist broadleaf forests ===
- Admiralty Islands lowland rain forests
- Central Range montane rain forests
- Huon Peninsula montane rain forests
- Louisiade Archipelago rain forests
- New Britain-New Ireland lowland rain forests
- New Britain-New Ireland montane rain forests
- Northern New Guinea lowland rain and freshwater swamp forests
- Northern New Guinea montane rain forests
- Solomon Islands rain forests
- Southeastern Papuan rain forests
- Southern New Guinea freshwater swamp forests
- Southern New Guinea lowland rain forests
- Trobriand Islands rain forests

=== Tropical and subtropical grasslands, savannas, and shrublands ===
- Trans-Fly savanna and grasslands

=== Montane grasslands and shrublands ===
- Central Range sub-alpine grasslands

=== Mangrove ecoregions ===
- New Guinea mangroves

== Freshwater ecoregions ==
- Bismark Archipelago
- New Guinea Central Mountains
- New Guinea North Coast
- Papuan Peninsula
- Solomon Islands
- Southwest New Guinea – Trans-Fly Lowland

== Marine ecoregions ==
=== Eastern Coral Triangle ===
- Bismarck Sea
- Solomon Archipelago
- Solomon Sea
- Southeast Papua New Guinea

=== Sahul shelf ===
- Gulf of Papua
- Arafura Sea
