= New Guinea =

Island in the Pacific Ocean

Native name: Niugini, Niu Gini, Papua
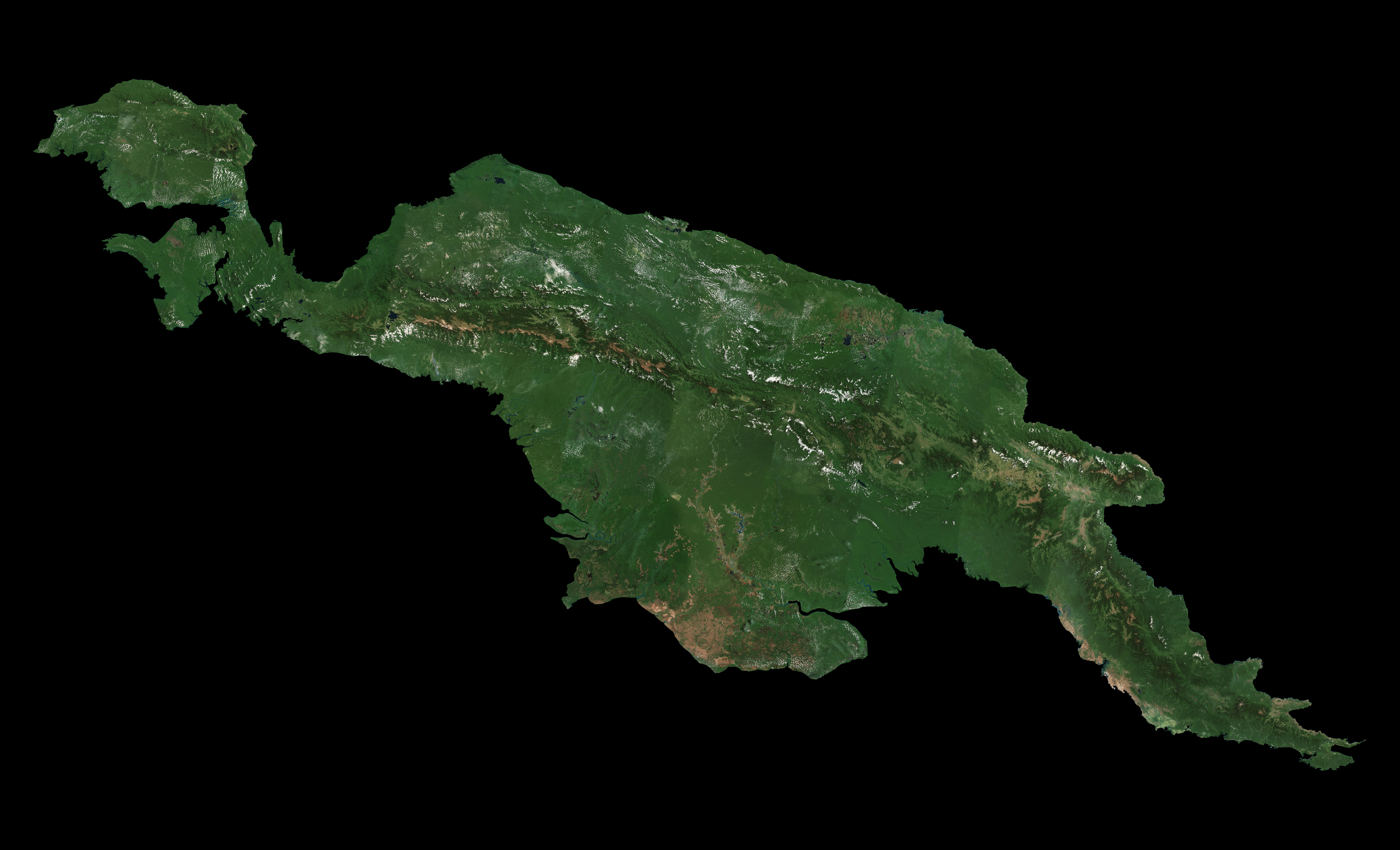

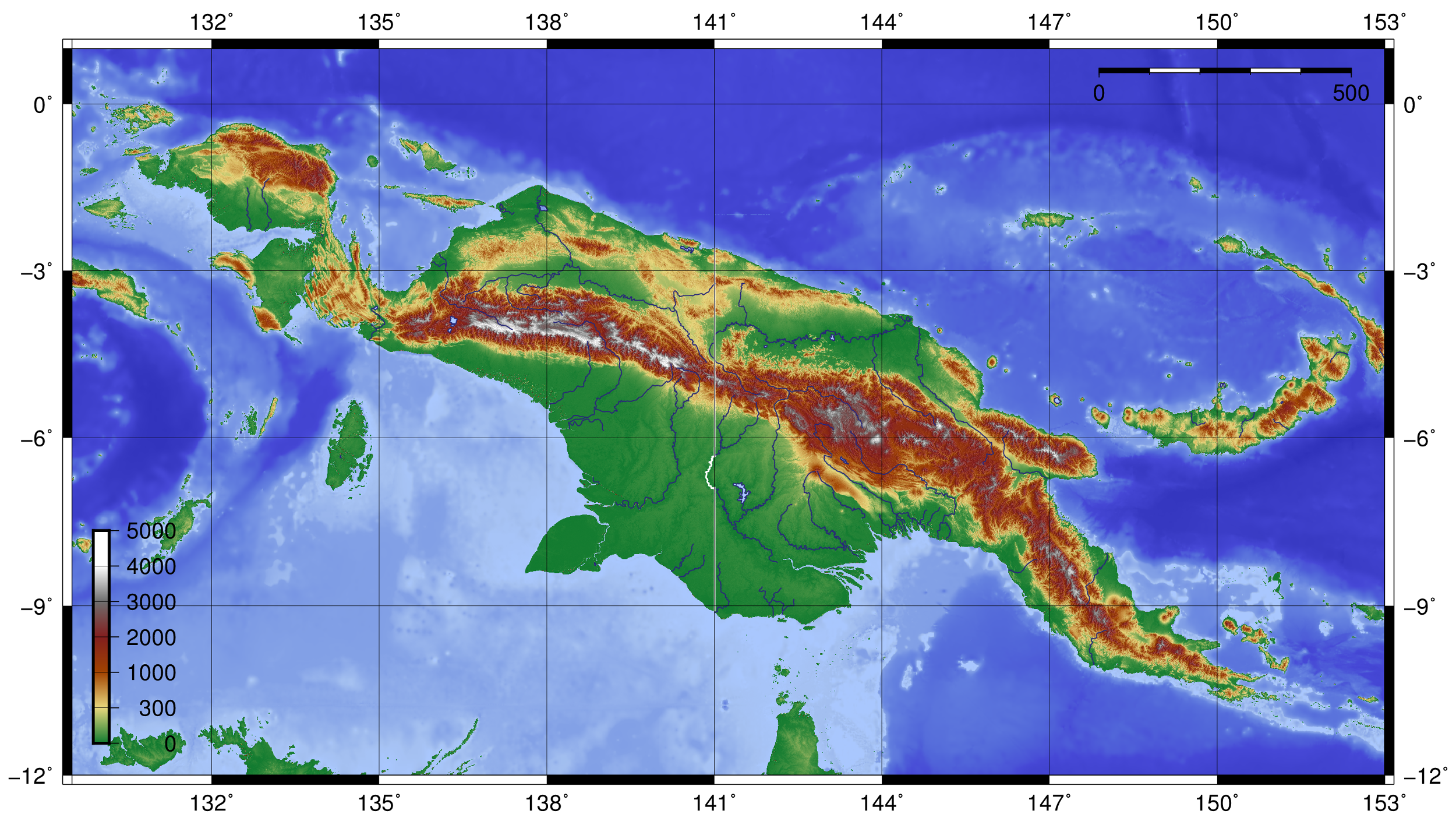
- New Guinea Island

Geography
- Location: Oceania
- Coordinates: 6°S 142°E
- Archipelago: Indonesian Archipelago Melanesia
- Area: 785,753 km^{2} (303,381 sq mi)
- Area rank: 2nd
- Highest elevation: 4,884 m (16024 ft)
- Highest point: Puncak Jaya

Administration
- Indonesia
- Provinces: Papua; Central Papua; Highland Papua; South Papua; Southwest Papua; West Papua
- Largest settlement: Jayapura (pop. 407,000)
- Papua New Guinea
- Provinces: Central; Simbu; Eastern Highlands; East Sepik; Enga; Gulf; Hela; Jiwaka; Madang; Morobe; Oro; Southern Highlands; Western; Western Highlands; West Sepik; Milne Bay; National Capital District
- Largest settlement: Port Moresby (pop. 402,000)

Demographics
- Population: 14,800,000 (2020)
- Population rank: 14th
- Pop. density: 18/km^{2} (47/sq mi)
- Languages: Tok Pisin; Hiri Motu; Indonesian; Papuan Malay; Javanese; English; Papuan languages; Papua New Guinean Sign
- Ethnic groups: Papuans; Ambonese; Bugis; Butonese; Evav/Kei; Javanese; Makassar; Minahasa; Toraja; Balinese

Additional information
- Time zones: Eastern Indonesia Time (UTC+9); Papua New Guinea Standard Time (UTC+10)

New Guinea (also known as Papua or historically Irian) (Note: Tok Pisin: Niugini; Hiri Motu: Niu Gini; Indonesian: Papua, fossilized Nugini) is the world's second-largest island, with an area of 785,753 km^{2} (303,381 sq mi). It has the third-largest remaining rainforest globally, and the highest plant biodiversity of any island.

Located in Melanesia in the southwestern Pacific Ocean, the island is separated from Australia by the 150-kilometre (81-nautical-mile; 93-mile) wide Torres Strait. Both landmasses lie on the same continental shelf, and were united during episodes of low sea level in the Pleistocene glaciations as the combined landmass of Sahul. Numerous smaller islands are located to the west and east. The island's name was given by Spanish explorer Yñigo Ortiz de Retez during his maritime expedition of 1545, due to the perceived resemblance of the indigenous peoples of the island to those in the African region of Guinea.

The eastern half of the island is the major land mass of the nation of Papua New Guinea. The western half, known as Western New Guinea, forms a part of Indonesia and is organized as the provinces of Papua, Central Papua, Highland Papua, South Papua, Southwest Papua, and West Papua. The two major cities on the island are Port Moresby and Jayapura.

== Names ==
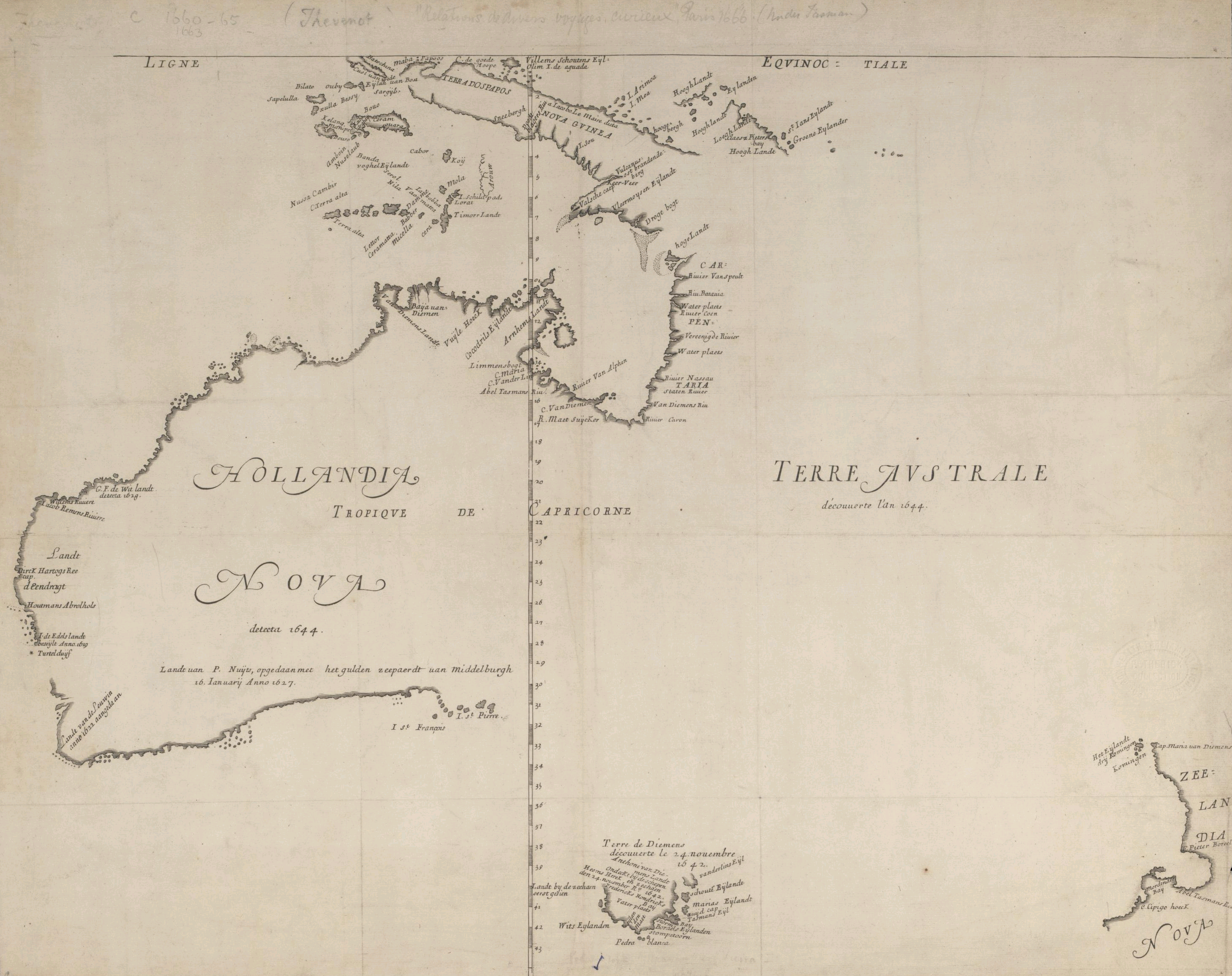
A 1644 map of New Guinea and the surrounding area

The name Papua was used to refer to parts of the island before contact with the West. Its etymology is unclear; one theory states that it derived from Tidore, the language used by the Sultanate of Tidore. An expedition by the Sultan of Tidore, together with Sahmardan, the Sangaji of Patani, and the Papuan Gurabesi, managed to conquer some areas in New Guinea, which was then reorganised to form Korano Ngaruha ("Four Kings") or Raja Ampat, Papoua Gam Sio (lit. "The Papua Nine Negeri"), and Mafor Soa Raha (lit. The Mafor "Four Soa"). The name comes from the words papo ("to unite") and ua (negation), which means "not united", i.e. an outlying possession of Tidore.

Anton Ploeg reports that the word papua is often said to be derived from the Malay word papua or pua-pua, meaning "frizzly-haired", referring to the very curly hair of the island's inhabitants. However Sollewijn Gelpke in 1993 considered this unlikely as it had been used earlier, and he instead derived it from the Biak phrase sup i babwa, which means "the land below [the sunset]", and refers to the Raja Ampat Islands.

When Portuguese and Spanish explorers arrived via the Spice Islands, they also used the name Papua. However, Westerners, beginning with Spanish explorer Yñigo Ortiz de Retez in 1545, used the name New Guinea, due to the resemblance between the indigenous peoples of the island and Africans of the Guinea region. The name is one of several toponyms sharing similar etymologies, ultimately meaning "land of the blacks" or similar meanings.

The Dutch, who arrived later under Jacob Le Maire and Willem Schouten, called it Schouten island. They later used this name only to refer to islands off the north coast of Papua proper, the Schouten Islands or Biak Island. When the Dutch colonized the main island as part of the Dutch East Indies, they called it Nieuw Guinea.

In Indonesian, the alternative name Nugini is generally only used as part of the country name of Papua New Guinea, Papua Nugini, and of the names of the historical territories of Dutch New Guinea (Nugini Belanda), German New Guinea (Nugini Jerman), and Territory of New Guinea (Teritori Nugini). Thus, Nugini is effectively a fossil word.

=== Irian ===
The name Irian was used in the Indonesian language to refer to the island and Indonesian province, as Irian Barat (West Irian) Province and later Irian Jaya Province. The name Irian was suggested during a tribal committee meeting in Tobati, Jayapura, formed by Soegoro Atmoprasodjo under governor J. P. van Eechoed, to decide on a new name because of the purportedly negative association of the name Papua.

Frans Kaisiepo, the committee leader, suggested the name from Mansren Koreri myths, Iri-an from the Biak language of Biak Island, meaning "hot land" (referring to the climate), but also from Iryan which means heated process as a metaphor for a land that is entering a new era. In Serui Iri-an (lit. "land-nation") means "pillar of nation", while in Merauke Iri-an (lit. "placed higher-nation") means "rising spirit" or "to rise".

The name was promoted in 1945 by Marcus Kaisiepo, brother of Frans Kaisiepo. The name was politicized later by Corinus Krey, Marthen Indey, Silas Papare, and others with the Indonesian backronym Ikut Republik Indonesia Anti Nederland ("Join the Republic of Indonesia Oppose the Netherlands"). Irian was used somewhat in 1972.

The name was used until 2001, when Papua was again used for the western island and the provinces. The name Irian, which was originally favoured by natives, is now considered to be a name imposed by the Indonesian government.

== Geography ==
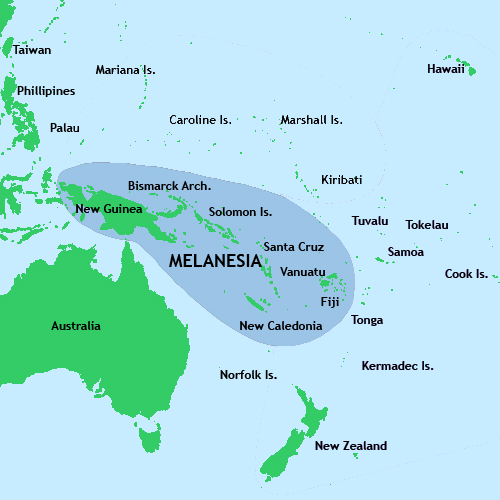
New Guinea located in relation to Melanesia

Papua New Guinea map of Köppen climate classification

New Guinea is an island to the north of the Australian mainland, south of the equator. It is isolated by the Arafura Sea to the west, and the Torres Strait and Coral Sea to the east. Sometimes considered to be the easternmost island of the Indonesian archipelago, it lies north of Australia's Top End, the Gulf of Carpentaria and Cape York Peninsula, and west of the Bismarck Archipelago and the Solomon Islands archipelago. Biologically, New Guinea may also be considered contiguous with northern Australia, as there is a continuity of flora and fauna between the two regions.

Politically, the western half of the island comprises six provinces of Indonesia: Papua, Central Papua, Highland Papua, South Papua, West Papua and Southwest Papua, although many indigenous Papuans have been campaigning for independence for at least 50 years, with a 2017 petition signed by 1.8 million Papuans presented to the United Nations. The eastern half forms the mainland of the country of Papua New Guinea, which is a constitutional monarchy and is part of the British Commonwealth.

The shape of New Guinea is often compared to that of a bird-of-paradise (indigenous to the island), and this results in the usual names for the two extremes of the island: the Bird's Head Peninsula in the northwest (Vogelkop in Dutch, Kepala Burung in Indonesian; also known as the Doberai Peninsula), and the Bird's Tail Peninsula in the southeast (also known as the Papuan Peninsula).

A spine of east–west mountains, the New Guinea Highlands, dominates the geography of New Guinea, stretching over 1,600 km (1,000 mi) across the island, with many mountains over 4,000 m (13,100 ft). The western half of the island contains the highest mountains in Oceania, with its highest point, Puncak Jaya, reaching an elevation of 4,884 m (16,023 ft). The tree line is around 4,000 m (13,100 ft) elevation, and the tallest peaks contain equatorial glaciers—which have been retreating since at least 1936. Various other smaller mountain ranges occur both north and west of the central ranges. Except in high elevations, most areas possess a warm humid climate throughout the year, with some seasonal variation associated with the northeast monsoon season.

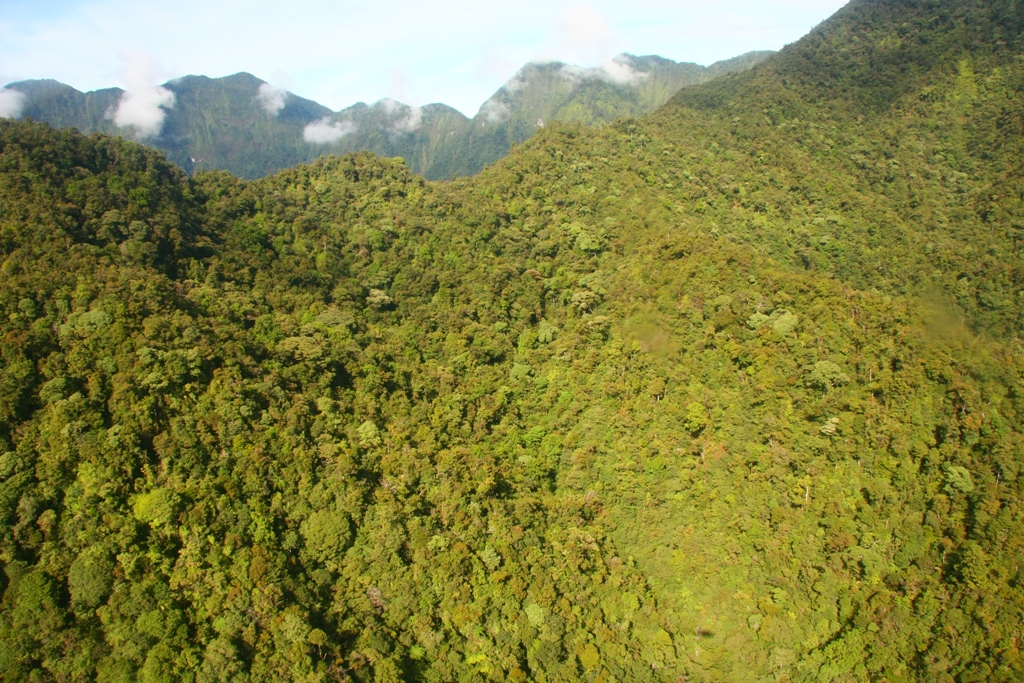
Mount Bosavi

Another major habitat feature is the vast southern and northern lowlands. Stretching for hundreds of kilometres, these include lowland rainforests, extensive wetlands, savanna grasslands, and some of the largest expanses of mangrove forest in the world. The southern lowlands are the site of Lorentz National Park, a UNESCO World Heritage Site. The northern lowlands are drained principally by the Mamberamo River and its tributaries on the western side, and by the Sepik on the eastern side. The more extensive southern lowlands are drained by a larger number of rivers, principally the Digul in the west and the Fly in the east. The largest island offshore, Dolak, lies near the Digul estuary, separated by a strait so narrow it has been named a "creek".

New Guinea contains many of the world's ecosystem types: glacial, alpine tundra, savanna, montane and lowland rainforest, mangroves, wetlands, lake and river ecosystems, seagrasses, and some of the richest coral reefs on the planet.

The entire length of the New Guinea Highlands system passes through New Guinea's vast watershed. The northern rivers flow into the Pacific Ocean, the southern rivers into the Arafura Sea and the Gulf of Papua. On the north side, the largest rivers are the Mamberamo, Sepik and Ramu. Mamberamo is born at the confluence of two large inland rivers: Tariku comes from the west to the east and Taritatu from the east. These rivers meander through swamps with huge internal descents and then merge. The Mamberamo thus formed reaches the ocean by breaking through the Coastal Mountains. Mamberamo River is navigable to Marine Falls. The Sepik, which also collects water from a spacious pool, is 1,100 kilometres from the Victor Emanuel Range to the estuary, making it the longest river in New Guinea. The winding, muddy, sluggish river has 500 km of navigable length. Ramu is a 650-km-long river. Its lower section is navigable, but its upper flow is high-falling, and fast-flowing. The energy of the river is used by a power plant near the city of Kainantu.

On the south side, notable rivers include the Pulau, Digul, Fly, Kikori and Purari. The Digul River originates from the Star Mountains, which rise to an altitude of 4,700 m, and is the largest river in the western part of the island. The coastal plain is bordered by a swamp hundreds of kilometres wide. Digul is the main transport route to the fertile hills and mountains within the island. The Fly River is born near the eastern branches of the Digul. It is named after one of the ships of the English Royal Fleet, which first sailed into the mouth of the river in 1845. The total length of the river is 1,050 km. Smaller boats can sail 900 km on the river. The estuary section, which decomposes into islands, is 70 km wide. The tide of the sea can have an effect of up to 300 kilometres. Strickland, a tributary of the Fly, reaches the Papuan Plain through wild gorges. Fly and Strickland together form the largest river in New Guinea. The many rivers flowing into the Gulf of Papua form a single delta complex. The rivers of New Guinea are notorious for their amount of water due to the annual rainfall of 2,000–10,000 mm. It has been estimated that the island's rivers carry about 1,500 km^{3}/a (48,000 m^{3}/s) of water into the sea, with Fly alone carrying more water (238 km^{3}/a (7,500 m^{3}/s)) than all the rivers in Australia combined.

== Relation to surroundings ==
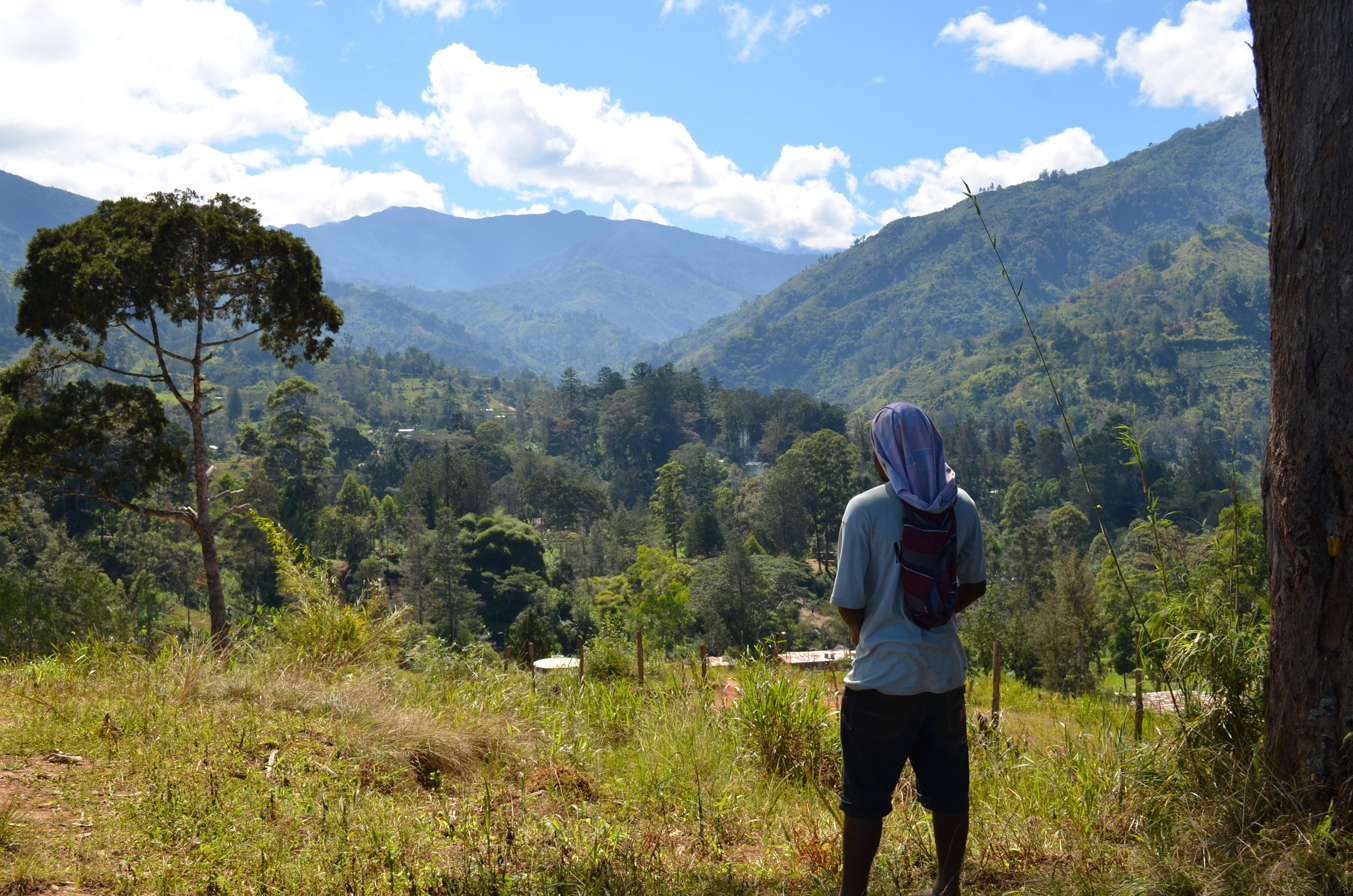
Highlands of Papua New Guinea

The island of New Guinea lies to the east of the Malay Archipelago, with which it is sometimes included as part of a greater Indo-Australian Archipelago. Geologically it is a part of the same tectonic plate as Australia. When world sea levels were low, the two shared shorelines (which now lie 100 to 140 metres below sea level) combined with lands now inundated, into the tectonic continent of Sahul, also known as Greater Australia. The two landmasses became separated when the area now known as the Torres Strait flooded after the end of the last glacial period.

Anthropologically, New Guinea is considered part of Melanesia.

New Guinea is differentiated from its drier, flatter, and less fertile southern counterpart, Australia, by its much higher rainfall and its active volcanic geology. Yet the two land masses share a similar animal fauna, with marsupials, including wallabies and possums, and the egg-laying monotreme, the echidna. Other than bats and some two dozen indigenous rodent genera, there are no pre-human indigenous placental mammals. Pigs, several additional species of rats, and the ancestor of the New Guinea singing dog were introduced with human colonization.

Prior to the 1970s, archaeologists called the single Pleistocene landmass by the name Australasia, although this word is most often used for a wider region that includes lands, such as New Zealand, which are not on the same continental shelf. In the early 1970s, they introduced the term Greater Australia for the Pleistocene continent. Then, at a 1975 conference and consequent publication, they extended the name Sahul from its previous use for just the Sahul Shelf to cover the continent.

== Political divisions ==
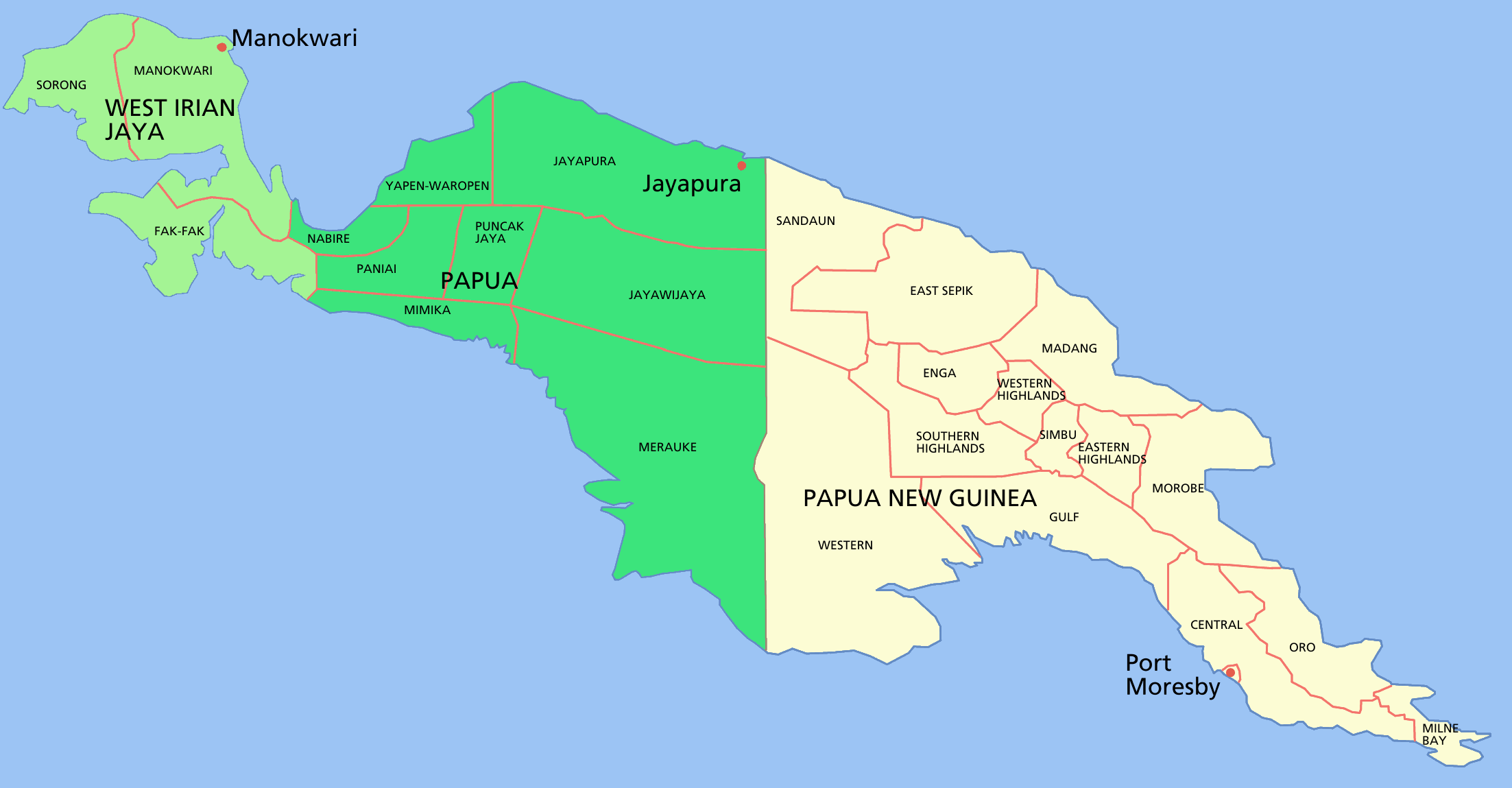
Political divisions of New Guinea (2006)

Southwest Papua province West Papua province Papua province Central Papua province Highland Papua province South Papua province

The island of New Guinea is divided politically into roughly equal halves across a north–south line:

- The western portion of the island located west of 141°E longitude (except for a small section of territory to the east of the Fly River which belongs to Papua New Guinea) was formerly a Dutch colony, part of the Dutch East Indies. After the West New Guinea dispute it is now six Indonesian provinces:
  - West Papua with Manokwari as its capital.
  - Papua with the city of Jayapura as its capital.
  - Highland Papua with Jayawijaya Regency as its capital.
  - Central Papua with Nabire Regency as its capital.
  - South Papua with Merauke Regency as its capital.
  - Southwest Papua with Sorong as its capital
- The eastern part forms the mainland of Papua New Guinea, which has been an independent country since 1975. It was formerly the Territory of Papua and New Guinea governed by Australia, consisting of the Trust Territory of New Guinea (northeastern quarter, formerly German New Guinea), and the Territory of Papua (southeastern quarter). Three of Papua New Guinea's four regions are parts of New Guinea island:
  - Southern, consisting of Western, Gulf, Central, Oro (Northern) and Milne Bay provinces.
  - Highlands, consisting of Southern Highlands, Hela Province, Jiwaka Province, Enga Province, Western Highlands, Simbu and Eastern Highlands provinces.
  - Momase, consisting of Morobe, Madang, East Sepik and Sandaun (West Sepik) provinces.

== Demographics ==
=== 10 largest cities and towns in New Guinea (Papua) by population ===
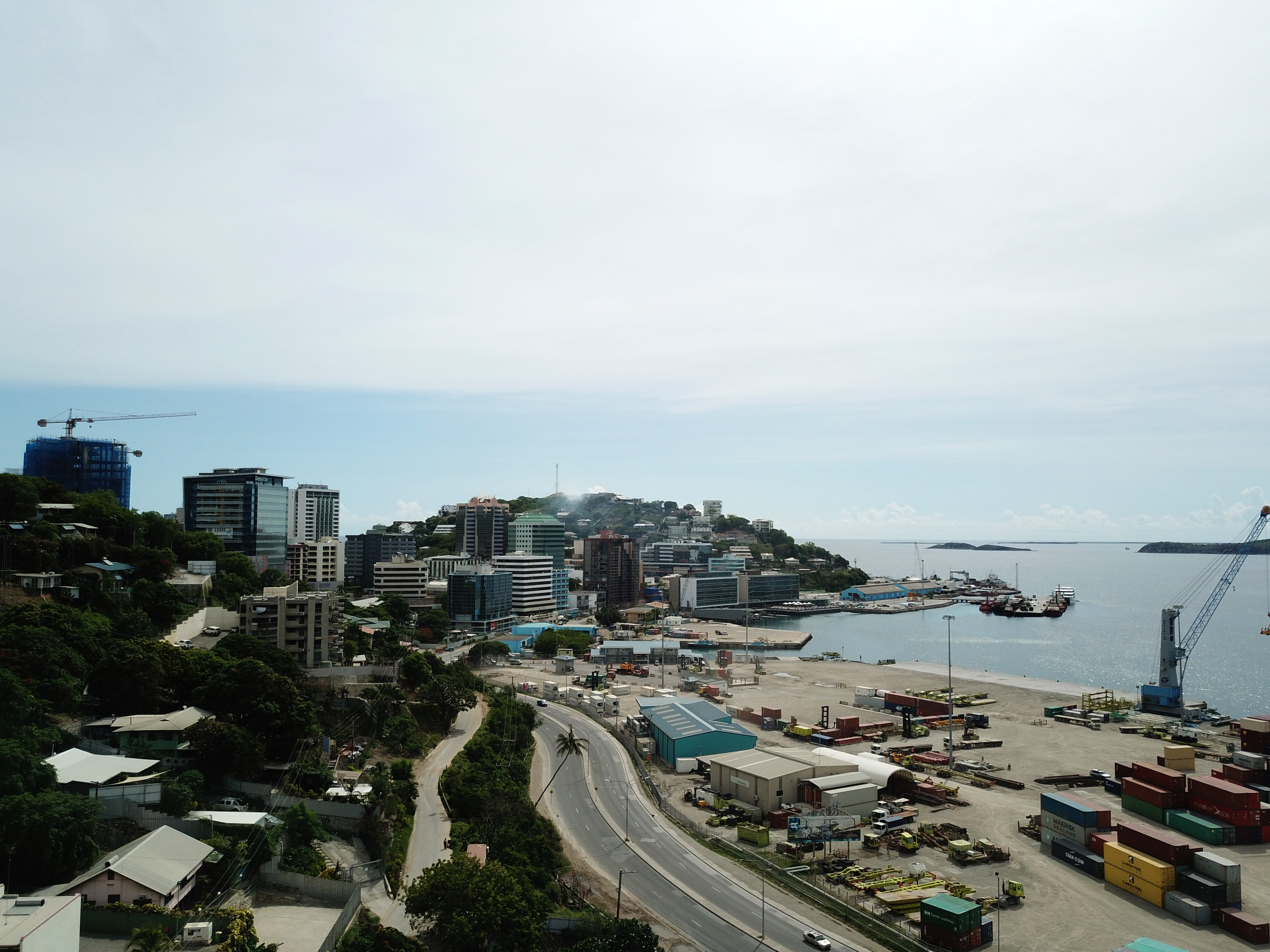
Port Moresby, the most populous city on the island of New Guinea (Papua)

- Provincial capital
- National capital

Rank	City	Population	Country	Province
1	Port Moresby	756,754	Papua New Guinea	NCD
2	Jayapura	414,862	Indonesia	Papua
3	Sorong	294,978	Indonesia	Southwest Papua
4	Lae	203,056	Papua New Guinea	Morobe
5	Timika	142,909	Indonesia	Central Papua
6	Manokwari	107,325	Indonesia	West Papua
7	Merauke	102,351	Indonesia	South Papua
8	Nabire	99,848	Indonesia	Central Papua
9	Sentani	71,174	Indonesia	Papua
10	Wamena	66,080	Indonesia	Highland Papua

=== People ===
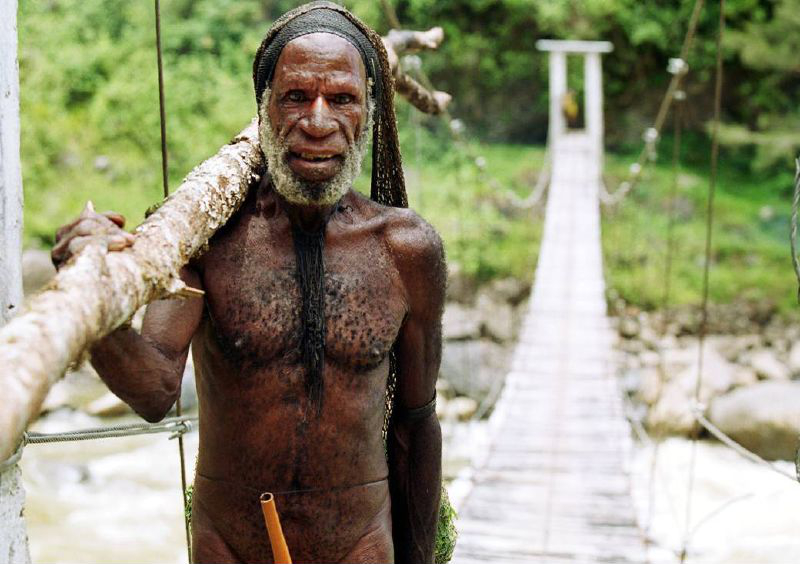
Yali tribesman in the Baliem Valley

The current population of the island of New Guinea is about fifteen million. Archaeological evidence indicates that humans may have inhabited the island continuously since 50,000 BCE, and first settlement possibly dating back to 60,000 years ago has been proposed. The island is presently populated by almost a thousand different tribal groups and a near-equivalent number of separate languages, which makes New Guinea the most linguistically diverse area in the world. Ethnologue's 14th edition lists 826 languages of Papua New Guinea and 257 languages of Western New Guinea, total 1073 languages, with 12 languages overlapping. They can be divided into two groups, the Austronesian languages, and all the others placed in the catch-all category of Papuan languages, most of which are unrelated.

The separation is not merely linguistic; warfare among societies was a factor in the evolution of the men's house: separate housing for groups of adult men, away from the single-family houses of women and children. Pig-based trade between groups and pig-based feasts form a common tradition with the other peoples of southeast Asia and Oceania. Most Papuan societies practice agriculture, supplemented by hunting and gathering.

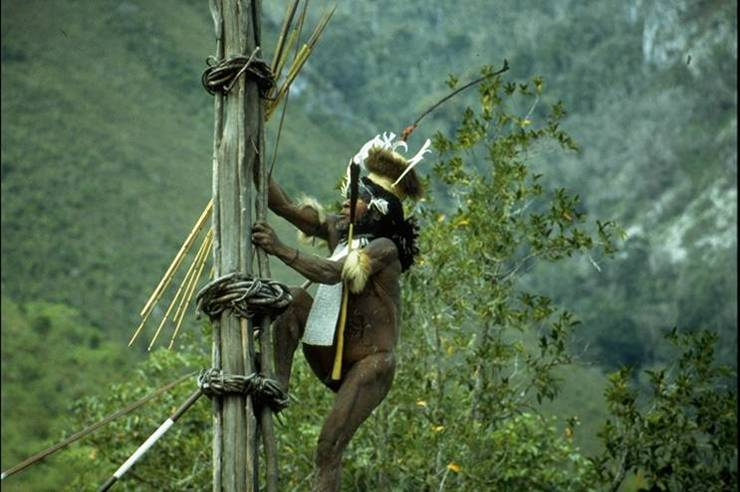
Yali Mabel, Kurulu Village War Chief at Baliem Valley

Current evidence indicates that the Papuans (who constitute the majority of the island's peoples) are descended from the earliest human inhabitants of New Guinea. These original inhabitants first arrived in New Guinea during the Last Glacial Period when the island was connected to the Australian continent via a land bridge, forming the landmass of Sahul. These peoples had made the (shortened) sea-crossing from the islands of Wallacea and Sundaland (the present Malay Archipelago) by at least 40,000 years ago.

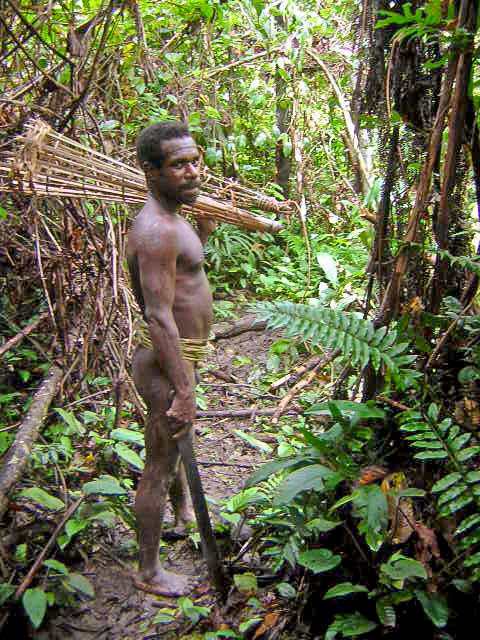
Korowai tribesman

The ancestral Austronesian peoples are believed to have arrived considerably later, approximately 3,500 years ago, as part of a gradual seafaring migration from Southeast Asia, possibly originating in Taiwan. Austronesian-speaking peoples colonized many of the offshore islands to the north and east of New Guinea, such as New Ireland and New Britain, with settlements also on the coastal fringes of the main island in places. Human habitation of New Guinea over tens of thousands of years has led to a great deal of diversity, which was further increased by the later arrival of the Austronesians and the more recent history of European and Asian settlement through events like transmigration.

In addition to Christianity and traditional belief systems, Islamic communities in parts of New Guinea, particularly in areas such as Fakfak and Sorong, have been noted for encouraging interfaith cooperation and maintaining traditions of peace and tolerance.

Large areas of New Guinea are yet to be explored by scientists and anthropologists. The Indonesian province of West Papua is home to an estimated 44 uncontacted tribal groups.

== Human Development Index by territory ==
HDI is a statistic of combined indicators that takes into account life expectancy, health, education and per-capita income.

Country	Province/state	HDI score	Country comparison
Indonesia (Papua)	Papua	0.753 (2026)	Egypt (0.754)
Indonesia (Papua)	Southwest Papua	0.713 (2026)	Morocco (0.710)
Indonesia (Papua)	West Papua	0.693 (2026)	Iraq (0.695)
Indonesia (Papua)	Central Papua	0.610 (2026)	Myanmar (0.609)
Indonesia (Papua)	South Papua	0.701 (2026)	Nauru (0.703)
Indonesia (Papua)	Highland Papua	0.553 (2026)	Tanzania (0.555)
Papua New Guinea (Papua New Guinea)	National Capital District	0.749 (2023)	
Papua New Guinea (Papua New Guinea)	Morobe	0.614 (2023)	
Papua New Guinea (Papua New Guinea)	Western Highlands	0.606 (2023)	
Papua New Guinea (Papua New Guinea)	Chimbu	0.592 (2023)	
Papua New Guinea (Papua New Guinea)	Central	0.589 (2023)	
Papua New Guinea (Papua New Guinea)	Western	0.583 (2023)	
Papua New Guinea (Papua New Guinea)	Madang	0.578 (2023)	
Papua New Guinea (Papua New Guinea)	Oro	0.567 (2023)	
Papua New Guinea (Papua New Guinea)	Jiwaka	0.566 (2023)	
Papua New Guinea (Papua New Guinea)	East Sepik	0.571 (2023)	
Papua New Guinea (Papua New Guinea)	Sandaun	0.550 (2023)	
Papua New Guinea (Papua New Guinea)	Eastern Highlands	0.544 (2023)	
Papua New Guinea (Papua New Guinea)	Gulf	0.541 (2023)	
Papua New Guinea (Papua New Guinea)	Enga	0.511 (2023)	
Papua New Guinea (Papua New Guinea)	Southern Highlands	0.511 (2023)	
Papua New Guinea (Papua New Guinea)	Hela	0.480 (2023)	

== Biodiversity and ecology ==
With some 786,000 km^{2} of tropical land—less than one-half of one percent (0.5%) of the Earth's surface—New Guinea has an immense biodiversity, containing between 5 and 10 percent of the total species on the planet. This percentage is about the same amount as that found in the United States or Australia. A high percentage of New Guinea's species are endemic, and thousands are still unknown to science: probably well over 200,000 species of insect, between 11,000 and 20,000 plant species, and over 650 resident bird species. Most of these species are shared, at least in their origin, with the continent of Australia, which was until fairly recent geological times part of the same landmass (see Australia-New Guinea for an overview). The island is so large that it is considered 'nearly a continent' in terms of its biological distinctiveness.

In the period from 1998 to 2008, conservationists identified 1,060 new species in New Guinea, including 218 plants, 43 reptiles, 12 mammals, 580 invertebrates, 134 amphibians, 2 birds and 71 fish. Between 2011 and 2017, researchers described 465 previously undocumented plant species in New Guinea. As of 2019, the Indonesian portion of New Guinea and the Maluku Islands is estimated to have 9,518 species of vascular plants, of which 4,380 are endemic. In 2020, an international study conducted by a team of 99 experts cataloged 13,634 species representing 1,742 genera and 264 families of vascular plants for New Guinea and its associated islands (Aru Islands, Bismarck Archipelago, D'Entrecasteaux Islands, Louisiade Archipelago), making it the world's most floristically diverse island, surpassing Madagascar (11,488), Borneo (11,165), Java (4,598), and the Philippines (9,432).

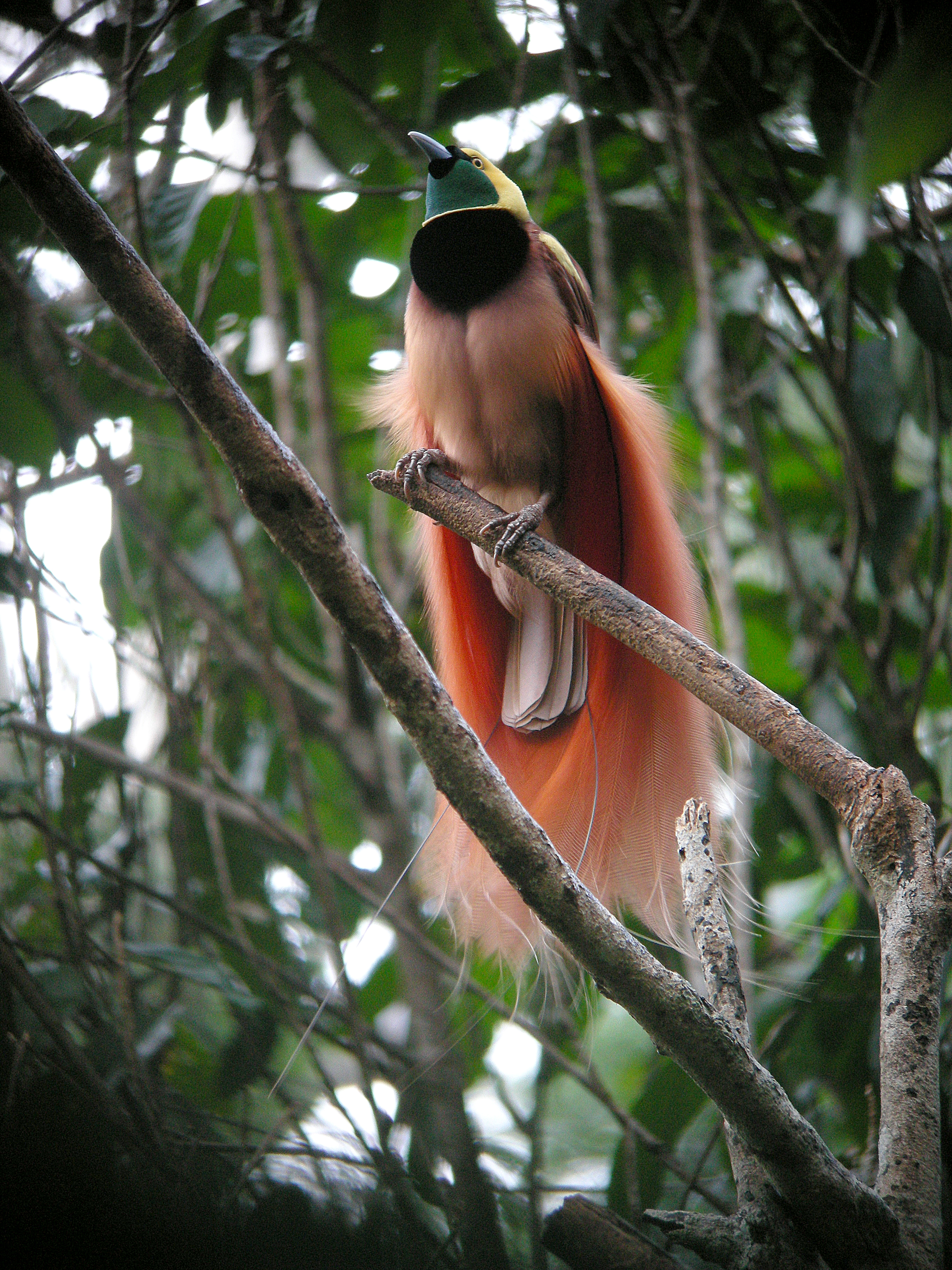
The raggiana bird-of-paradise is native to New Guinea.

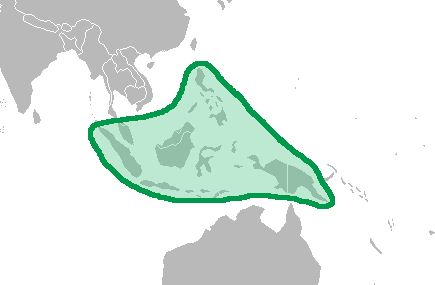
The floristic region of Malesia

Biogeographically, New Guinea is part of Australasia rather than the Indomalayan realm, although New Guinea's flora has many more affinities with Asia than its fauna, which is overwhelmingly Australian. Botanically, New Guinea is considered part of Malesia, a floristic region that extends from the Malay Peninsula across Indonesia to New Guinea and the East Melanesian Islands. The flora of New Guinea is a mixture of many tropical rainforest species with origins in Asia, together with typically Australasian flora. Typical Southern Hemisphere flora include the conifers Podocarpus and the rainforest emergents Araucaria and Agathis, as well as tree ferns and several species of Eucalyptus.

New Guinea has 284 species and six orders of mammals: monotremes, three orders of marsupials, rodents and bats; 195 of the mammal species (69%) are endemic. New Guinea has 578 species of breeding birds, of which 324 species are endemic. The island's frogs are one of the most poorly known vertebrate groups, totalling 282 species, but this number is expected to double or even triple when all species have been documented. New Guinea has a rich diversity of coral life and 1,200 species of fish have been found. Also about 600 species of reef-building coral—the latter equal to 75 percent of the world's known total. The entire coral area covers 18 million hectares off a peninsula in northwest New Guinea.

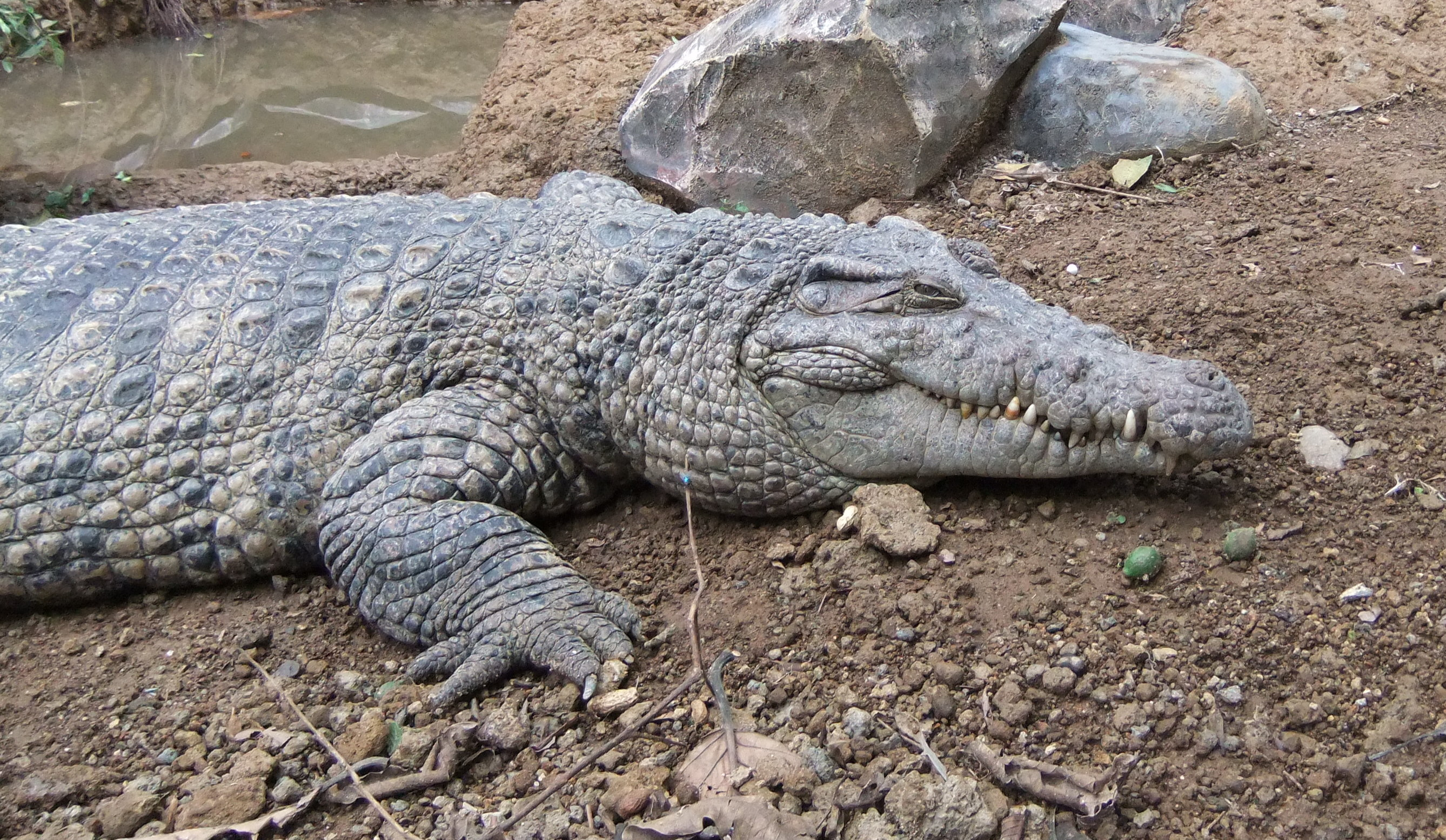
New Guinea crocodile

As of 2020, the Western portion of New Guinea, Papua and West Papua, accounts for 54% of the island's primary forest and about 51% of the island's total tree cover, according to satellite data.

=== Ecoregions ===
==== Terrestrial ====
According to the WWF, New Guinea can be divided into twelve terrestrial ecoregions:

- Central Range montane rain forests
- Central Range sub-alpine grasslands
- Huon Peninsula montane rain forests
- New Guinea mangroves
- Northern New Guinea lowland rain and freshwater swamp forests
- Northern New Guinea montane rain forests
- Southeastern Papuan rain forests
- Southern New Guinea freshwater swamp forests
- Southern New Guinea lowland rain forests
- Trans-Fly savanna and grasslands
- Vogelkop montane rain forests
- Vogelkop-Aru lowland rain forests

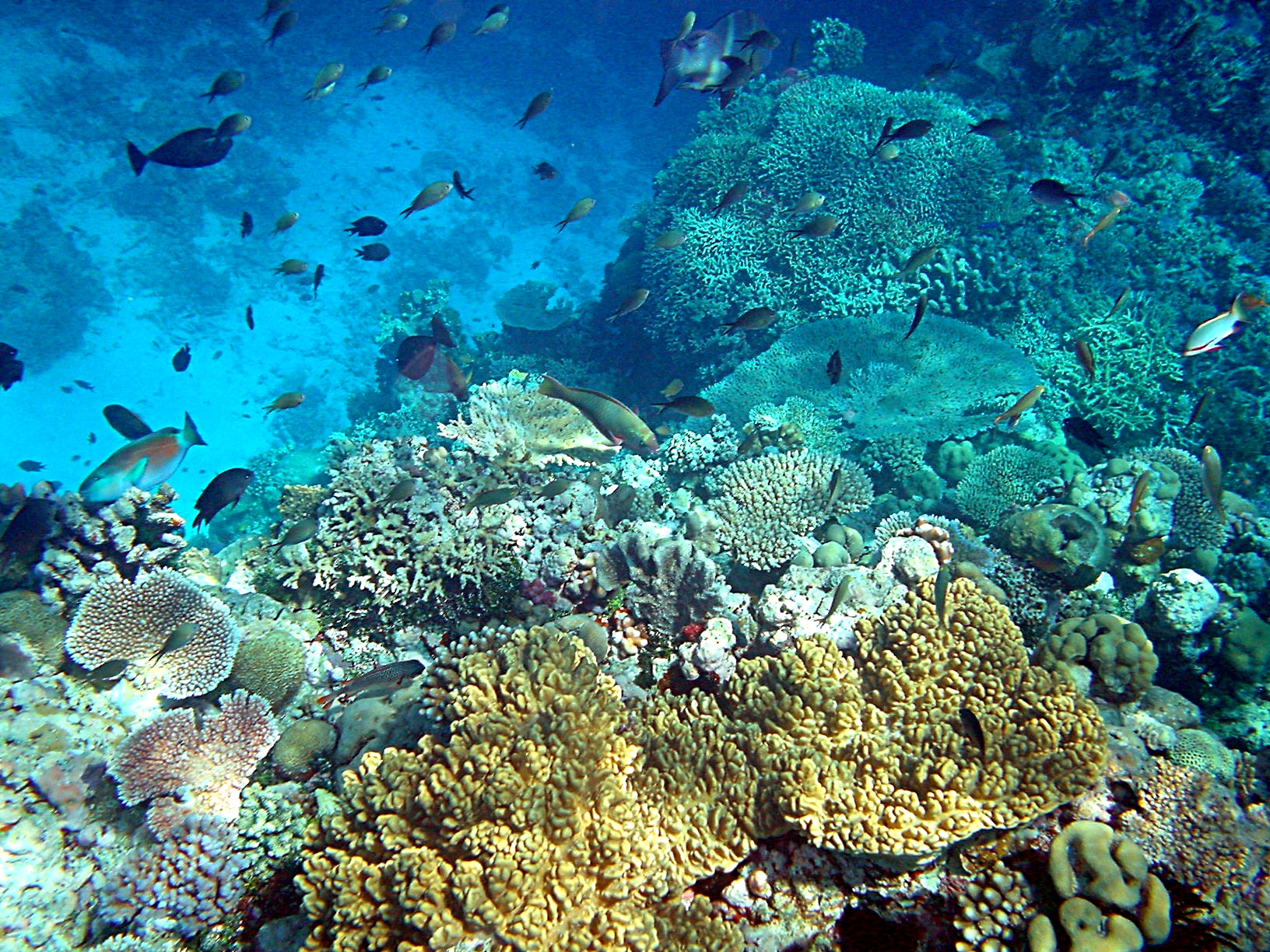
Coral reefs in Papua New Guinea

==== Freshwater ====
The WWF and Nature Conservancy divide New Guinea into five freshwater ecoregions:

- Vogelkop–Bomberai
- New Guinea North Coast
- New Guinea Central Mountains
- Southwest New Guinea–Trans-Fly Lowland
- Papuan Peninsula

==== Marine ====
The WWF and Nature Conservancy identify several marine ecoregions in the seas bordering New Guinea:

- Papua
- Arafura Sea
- Bismarck Sea
- Solomon Sea
- Southeast Papua New Guinea
- Gulf of Papua

== History ==
=== Early history ===
The continent of Sahul before the rising ocean sundered Australia and New Guinea after the last ice age

Archaeological evidence indicates that humans arrived on New Guinea perhaps 60,000 years ago, although this is under debate. They came probably by sea from Southeast Asia during the Last Glacial Period, when the sea was lower and distances between islands shorter.

The first inhabitants, from whom the Papuan people are probably descended, adapted to the range of ecologies and, in time, developed one of the earliest known agricultures. Remains of this agricultural system, in the form of ancient irrigation systems in the highlands of Papua New Guinea, are being studied by archaeologists. Research indicates that the highlands were an early and independent center of agriculture, with evidence of irrigation going back at least 10,000 years. Sugarcane was cultivated in New Guinea around 6000 BCE.

The gardens of the New Guinea Highlands are ancient, intensive permacultures, adapted to high population densities, very high rainfalls (as high as 10,000 mm per year (400 in/yr)), earthquakes, hilly land, and occasional frost. Complex mulches, crop rotations and tillages are used in rotation on terraces with complex irrigation systems. Western agronomists still do not understand all of the practices, and it has been noted that native gardeners are as, or even more, successful than most scientific farmers in raising certain crops. There is evidence that New Guinea gardeners invented crop rotation well before western Europeans. A unique feature of New Guinea permaculture is the silviculture of Casuarina oligodon, a tall, sturdy native ironwood tree, suited to use for timber and fuel, with root nodules that fix nitrogen. Pollen studies show that it was adopted during an ancient period of extreme deforestation.

In more recent millennia, another wave of people arrived on the shores of New Guinea. These were the Austronesian people, who had spread south from Taiwan, through the South-east Asian archipelago, colonising many of the islands on the way. The Austronesian people had technology and skills extremely well adapted to ocean voyaging and Austronesian language speaking people are present along much of the coastal areas and islands of New Guinea. They also introduced pigs and dogs. These Austronesian migrants are considered the ancestors of most people in insular Southeast Asia, from Sumatra and Java to Borneo and Sulawesi, as well as coastal new Guinea.

=== Precolonial history ===
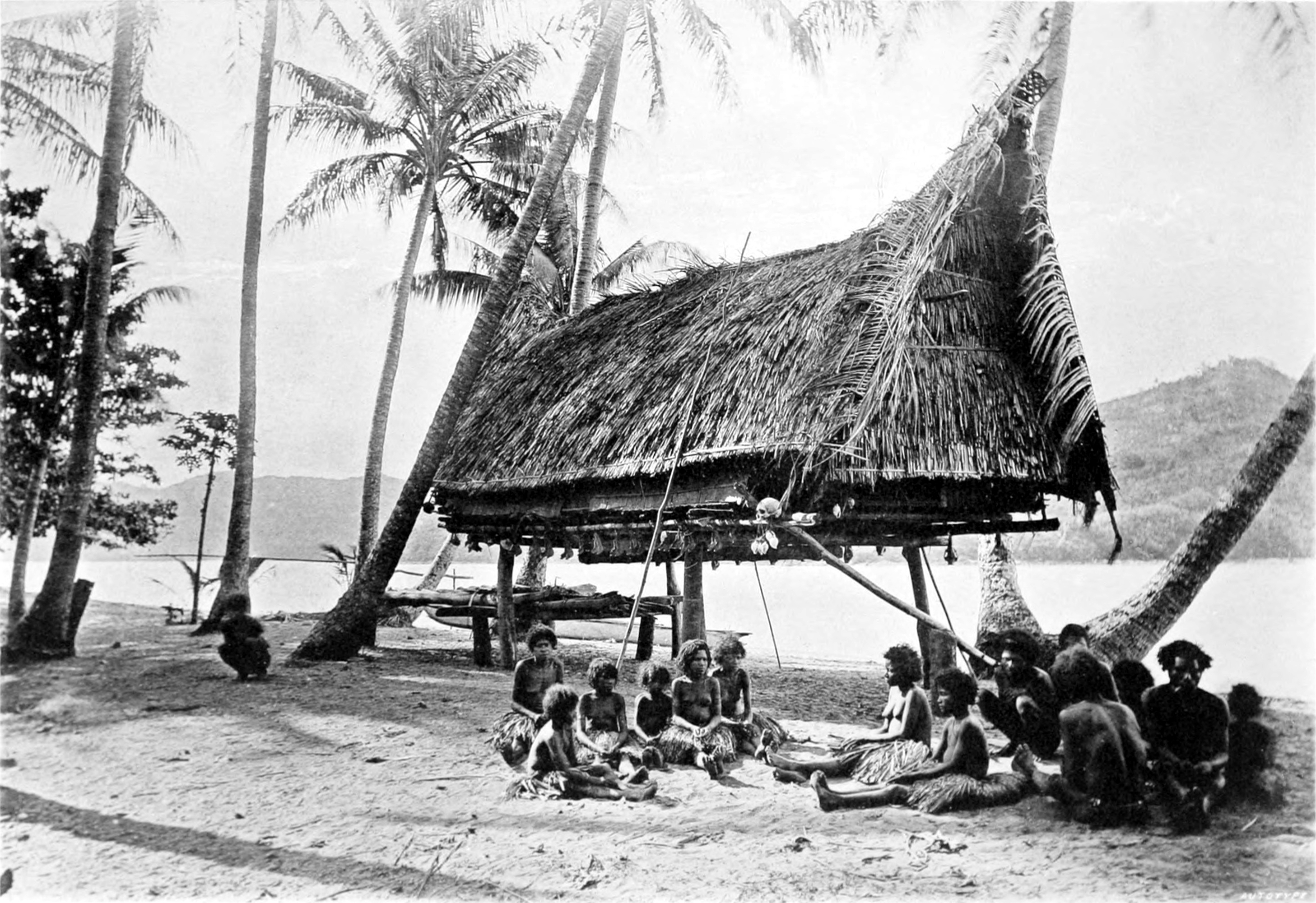
Group of natives at Mairy Pass, mainland of British New Guinea, 1885

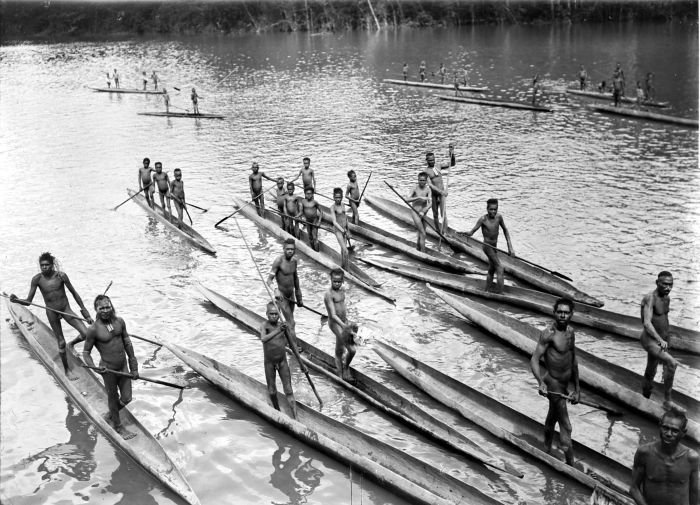
Papuans on the Lorentz River, photographed during the third South New Guinea expedition in 1912–13

The western part of the island was in contact with kingdoms in other parts of modern-day Indonesia. The Negarakertagama mentioned the region of Wanin and Sran, in eastern Nusantara as part of Majapahit's tributary. This 'Wanin' has been identified with the Onin Peninsula, part of the Bomberai Peninsula near the city of Fakfak. while 'Sran' had been identified as region of Kowiai, just south of Onin peninsula. The sultans of Tidore, in the Maluku Islands, claimed sovereignty over various coastal parts of the island. During Tidore's rule, the main exports of the island during this period were resins, spices, slaves and the highly priced feathers of the bird-of-paradise. In a period of constant conflict called 'hongi wars', in which rival villages or kingdoms would invoke the name of Tidore Sultan, rightly, for punitive expeditions for not fulfilling their tributary obligations, or opportunitively for competitions over resources and prestige. Sultan Nuku, one of the most famous Tidore sultans who rebelled against Dutch colonization, called himself "Sultan of Tidore and Papua", during his revolt in 1780s. He commanded loyalty from both Moluccan and Papuan chiefs, especially those of Raja Ampat Islands, from his base in Gebe. Following Tidore's subjugation as Dutch tributary, much of the territory it claimed in western part of New Guinea came under Dutch rule as part of Dutch East Indies.

=== European contact ===
The first known European contact with New Guinea was by Portuguese and Spanish sailors in the 16th century. In 1526–27, Portuguese explorer Jorge de Menezes saw the western tip of New Guinea and named it ilhas dos Papuas. In 1528, the Spanish navigator Álvaro de Saavedra also recorded its sighting when trying to return from Tidore to New Spain. In 1545, Spaniard Íñigo Ortíz de Retes sailed along the north coast of New Guinea as far as the Mamberamo River, near which he landed on 20 June, naming the island 'Nueva Guinea'. The first known map of the island was made by F. Hoeiu in 1600 and shows it as 'Nova Guinea'. In 1606, Luís Vaz de Torres explored the southern coast of New Guinea from Milne Bay to the Gulf of Papua including Orangerie Bay, which he named Bahía de San Lorenzo. His expedition also discovered Basilaki Island naming it Tierra de San Buenaventura, which he claimed for Spain in July 1606. On 18 October, his expedition reached the western part of the island in present-day Indonesia, and also claimed the territory for the King of Spain.

Map of New Guinea illustrating the colonial situation between 1884 and 1919. The western half was controlled by the Netherlands, the north-eastern part by Germany, and the south-eastern part by Britain (later transferred to Australia in 1906).

A successive European claim occurred in 1828, when the Netherlands formally claimed the western half of the island as Dutch New Guinea. Dutch colonial authority built Fort Du Bus an administrative and trading post established near Lobo, Triton Bay, but by 1835 had been abandoned. Considering that New Guinea had little economic value for them, the Dutch promoted Tidore as suzerain of Papua. By 1849, Tidore's borders had been extended to the proximity of the current international border between Indonesia and Papua New Guinea, as it formed extensive trade pact and custom of Uli-Siwa ( federation of nine ).

In 1883, following a short-lived French annexation of New Ireland, the British colony of Queensland annexed south-eastern New Guinea. However, the Queensland government's superiors in the United Kingdom revoked the claim, and (formally) assumed direct responsibility in 1884, when Germany claimed north-eastern New Guinea as the protectorate of German New Guinea (also called Kaiser-Wilhelmsland).

The first Dutch government posts were established in 1898 and in 1902: Manokwari on the north coast, Fak-Fak in the west and Merauke in the south at the border with British New Guinea. The German, Dutch and British colonial administrators each attempted to suppress the still-widespread practices of inter-village warfare and headhunting within their respective territories.

On 18 March 1902, the British government transferred some administrative responsibility over southeast New Guinea to Australia (which renamed the area "Territory of Papua"); and, in 1906, transferred all remaining responsibility to Australia. During World War I, Australian forces seized German New Guinea, which in 1920 became the Territory of New Guinea, to be administered by Australia under a League of Nations mandate. The territories under Australian administration became collectively known as The Territories of Papua and New Guinea (until February 1942).

Before about 1930, European maps showed the highlands as uninhabited forests. When first flown over by aircraft, numerous settlements with agricultural terraces and stockades were observed. The most startling discovery took place on 4 August 1938, when Richard Archbold discovered the Grand Valley of the Baliem River, which had 50,000 yet-undiscovered Stone Age farmers living in orderly villages. The people, known as the Dani, were the last society of its size to make first contact with the rest of the world. A 1930 expedition led by the prospector Michael Lehay also encountered an indigenous group in the highlands. The inhabitants, believing themselves to be the only people in the world and, having never seen Europeans before, initially believed the explorers to be spirits of the dead due to the local belief that a person's skin turned white when they died and crossed into the land of the dead.

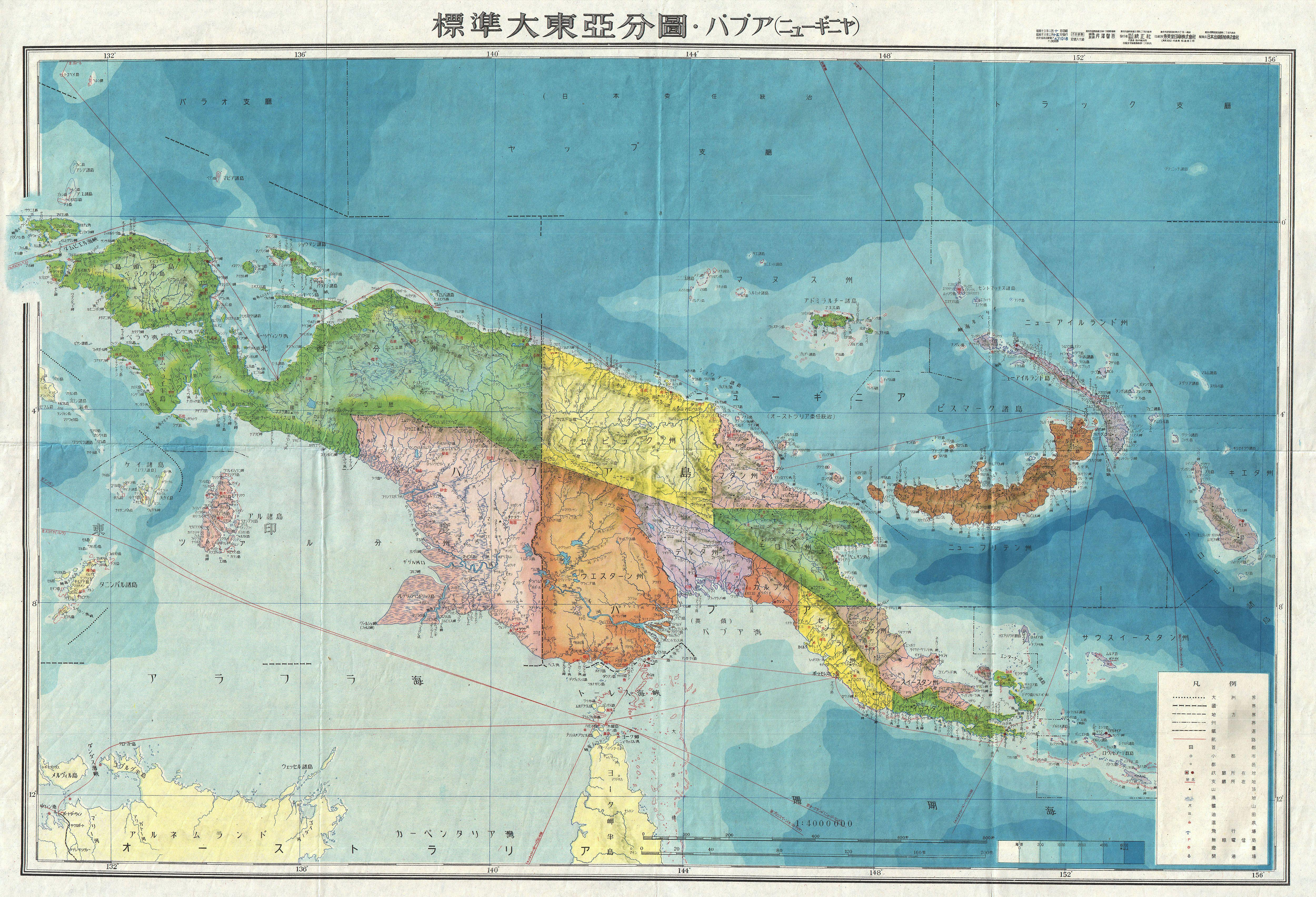
A Japanese military map of New Guinea from 1943

=== World War II ===
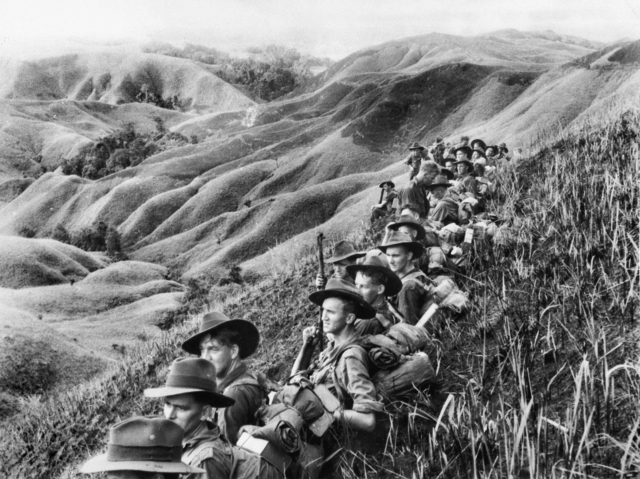
Australian soldiers resting in the Finisterre Ranges of New Guinea while en route to the front line

Netherlands New Guinea and the Australian territories (the eastern half ) were invaded in 1942 by the Japanese. The Netherlands were defeated by that stage and did not put up a fight, and the western section was not of any strategic value to either side, so they did not battle there. The Japanese invaded the north shore of the Australia territories and were aiming to move south and take the southern shore too. The highlands, northern and eastern parts of the island became key battlefields in the South West Pacific Theatre of World War II. Notable battles were for Port Moresby (the naval battle is known as the Battle of the Coral Sea), Milne Bay and for the Kokoda track. Papuans often gave vital assistance to the Allies, fighting alongside Australian troops, and carrying equipment and injured men across New Guinea. Approximately 216,000 Japanese, Australian and U.S. soldiers, sailors and airmen died during the New Guinea Campaign.

=== Since World War II ===
Following the return to civil administration after World War II, the Australian section was known as the Territory of Papua-New Guinea from 1945 to 1949 and then as Territory of Papua and New Guinea. Although the rest of the Dutch East Indies achieved independence as Indonesia on 27 December 1949, the Netherlands regained control of western New Guinea.

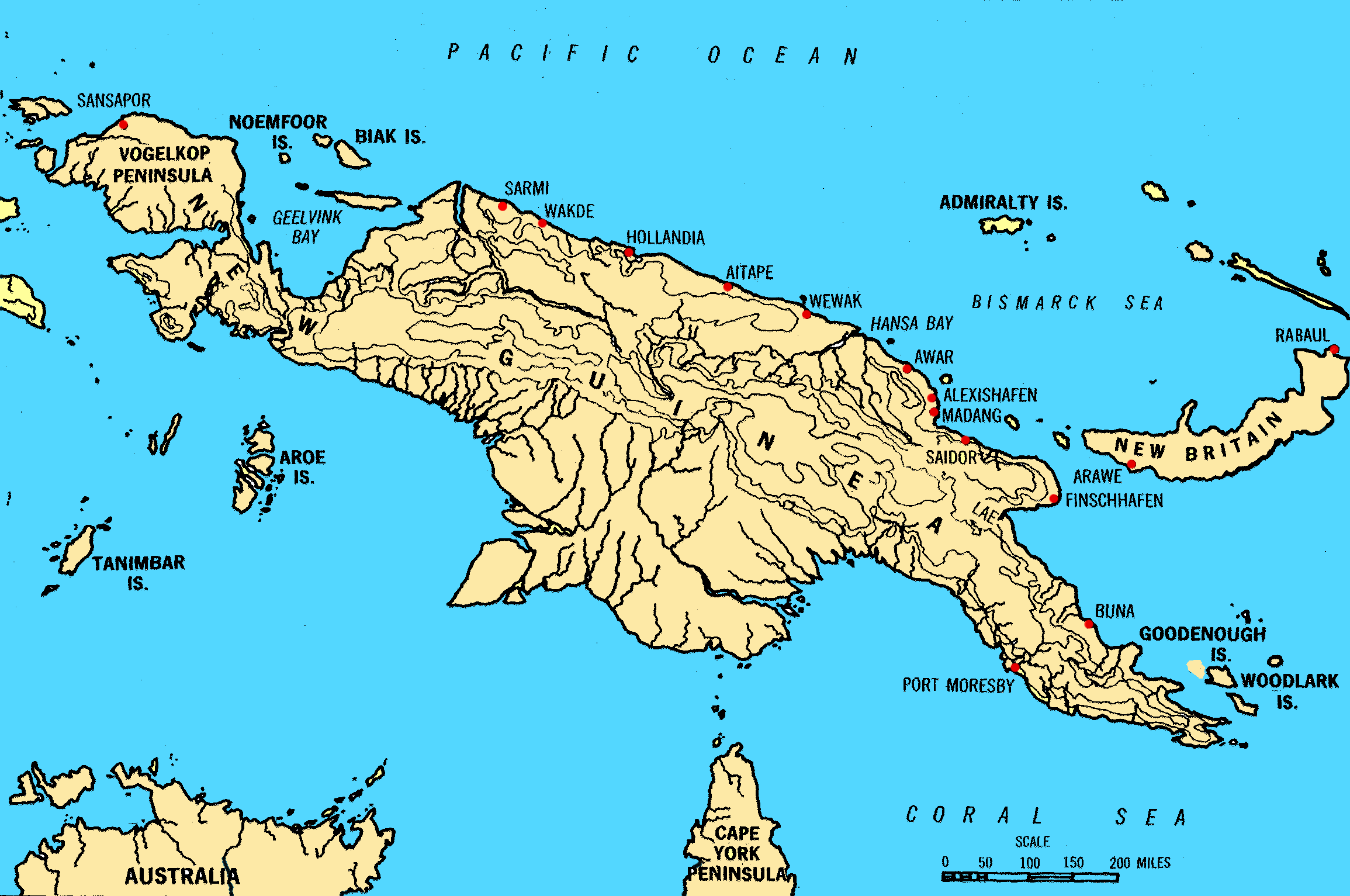
Map of New Guinea, with place names as used in English in the 1940s

During the 1950s, the Dutch government began to prepare Netherlands New Guinea for full independence and allowed elections in 1959; the partial elected New Guinea Council took office on 5 April 1961. The Council decided on the name of West Papua (Papua Barat) for the territory, along with an emblem, flag, and anthem to complement those of the Netherlands. On 1 October 1962, after some military interventions and negotiations, the Dutch handed over the territory to the United Nations Temporary Executive Authority, until 1 May 1963, when Indonesia took control. The territory was renamed West Irian (Irian Barat) and then Irian Jaya. In 1969, Indonesia, under the 1962 New York Agreement, organised a referendum named the Act of Free Choice, in which the military hand picked Papuan tribal elders to vote for integration with Indonesia.

There has been significant reported resistance to Indonesian integration and occupation, both through civil disobedience (such as publicly raising the Morning Star flag) and via the formation of the Organisasi Papua Merdeka (OPM, or Free Papua Movement) in 1965. Amnesty International has estimated more than 100,000 Papuans, one-sixth of the population, have died as a result of government-sponsored violence against West Papuans. Reports published by TRT World and De Gruyter Oldenbourg have put the number of killed Papuans since the start of the conflict at roughly 500,000.

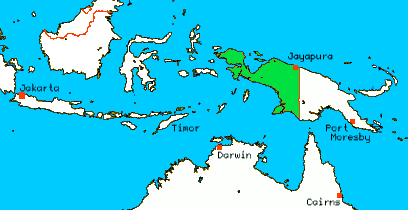
Western New Guinea was formally annexed by Indonesia in 1969.

From 1971, the name Papua New Guinea was used for the Australian territory. On 16 September 1975, Australia granted full independence to Papua New Guinea. In 2000, Irian Jaya was formally renamed "The Province of Papua" and a Law on Special Autonomy was passed in 2001. The Law established a Papuan People's Assembly (MRP) with representatives of the different indigenous cultures of Papua. The MRP was empowered to protect the rights of Papuans, raise the status of women in Papua, and to ease religious tensions in Papua; block grants were given for the implementation of the Law as much as $266 million in 2004. The Indonesian courts' enforcement of the Law on Special Autonomy blocked further creation of subdivisions of Papua: although President Megawati Sukarnoputri was able to create a separate West Papua province in 2003 as a fait accompli, plans for a third province on western New Guinea were blocked by the courts. Critics argue that the Indonesian government has been reluctant to establish or issue various government implementing regulations so that the legal provisions of special autonomy could be put into practice, and as a result special autonomy in Papua has "failed".

In 2022, the Indonesian government split Papua Province into four provinces. In addition to Papua Province proper (capital Jayapura), the three new provinces are South Papua (capital Merauke), Central Papua (capital Nabire) and Highland Papua (capital Jayawijaya). Furthermore, Southwest Papua (capital Sorong) was split from West Papua (capital Manokwari).

The culture of inter-tribal warfare and animosity between neighbouring tribes persists in New Guinea.
