= New Guinea mangroves =

Mangrove ecoregion that covers extensive areas of the coastline New Guinea

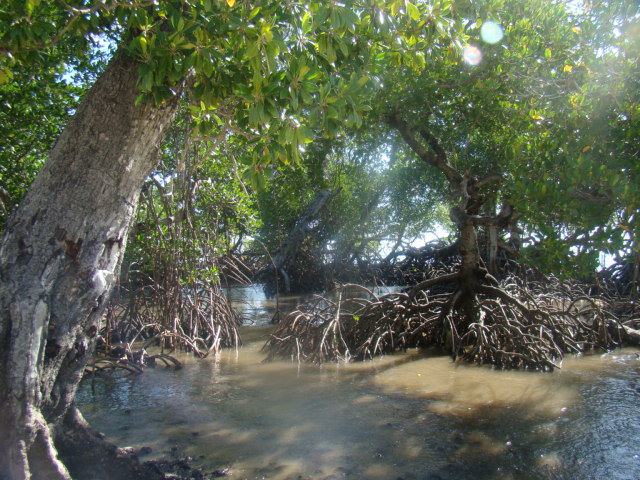
- New Guinea mangroves

- Location of the New Guinea mangroves (in purple)

Ecology
- Realm: Australasian realm
- Biome: mangroves
- Borders: List: Biak–Numfoor rain forests; Northern New Guinea lowland rain and freshwater swamp forests; Southeastern Papuan rain forests, Southern New Guinea freshwater swamp forests; Southern New Guinea lowland rain forests; Trans-Fly savanna and grasslands; Vogelkop–Aru lowland rain forests

Geography
- Area: 25,303 km^{2} (9,770 mi^{2})
- Countries: Indonesia; Papua New Guinea
- Provinces: Papua; West Papua (Indonesia); Central; East Sepik; Gulf; Madang; Sandaun, Western (Papua New Guinea)
- Coordinates: 5.1°S 137.7°E

Conservation
- Conservation status: Vulnerable
- Protected: 5,833 km² (23%)

The New Guinea mangroves is a mangrove ecoregion that covers extensive areas of the coastline New Guinea, the large island in the western Pacific Ocean north of Australia.

== Location and description ==
The New Guinea mangroves cover an area of 26,800 square kilometers (10,300 sq mi), particularly among the river mouths of the island's south coast. This ecoregion contains the greatest diversity of mangrove species in the world and they are an important habitat for wildlife. Areas of mangroves on the northern coast of New Guinea can be found at the mouths of the Sepik and Ramu rivers on the eastern side of Cenderawasih Bay, and Dyke Ackland Bay and Ward Hunt Strait. However the largest areas are found on the south coast, including in the mouths of the Purari, Kikori, and Fly rivers. Some areas such as the Kikori delta have larger and thicker mangroves than others. Bintuni Bay in western New Guinea, which lies between the Bird's Head and Bomberai peninsulas, contains the largest continuous area of mangroves in Indonesia, and is second only to the Sundarbans of India and Bangladesh.

== Climate ==
The coast of New Guinea has a Tropical monsoon climate apart from the length of drier Trans-Fly savanna and grasslands coastline on the south coast.

=== The growth of mangroves ===
Mangroves depend on a complex series of dynamic natural tidal processes that create the conditions for their survival. Rivers depositing sediment, together with waves and coastal currents, reshape the tidal zone where mangroves thrive. There are several features that all species of mangroves have in common. These include tolerance to conditions of high soil salinity, tolerance to submergence in water, or waterlogged soil, and to low oxygen conditions. The use of water to disperse young plants is also very characteristic of mangroves. As a result of the water-logged soil that mangrove trees reside in, they have formed adaptations to help them survive. For example, black mangroves survive in water-logged soil by using special "root snorkels" called pneumatophores. These structures are covered with small holes call lenticels that allow the roots to breathe the same way a snorkel lets you breathe while underwater. When trying to overcome the obstacle of the salinity that these trees live in, they have a few adaptations. They can actually concentrate much of the salt concentration in older leaves, which are soon to fall off, taking the excess salt with them. Some species even have salt glands which excrete salt to the surface of the leaves allowing it to be washed away by rain.

Mangroves begin as a seed called a propagule, which germinates while still attached to the tree. The seed has a long cylindrical shape that falls off the parent tree and either sticks in the mud growing next to the parent tree, or floats off to sea. These seeds have a very strong, protective covering that allows them to float and survive for long distances and periods of time. The seedling may finally reach a point of its destination where conditions are favorable, and the roots will begin to bury into the ground, forming a new mangrove tree. The dispersal of these "live" young trees is called vivipary, or birth of live young, very similar to mammals.

== Flora ==
The range of newly deposited and well-established areas, varying water depth, and variations in salinity from the mixing of salt and fresh water create a diversity of habitats that are home to different mixes of species. On the shoreline pioneering species like the Avicennia species Avicennia alba and Avicennia marina are usually the first to establish on coastal shores, with Sonneratia growing in the coastal tidal creeks. Their complex root networks encourage further sedimentation and growth which then creates shade that allows Rhizophora mucronata to establish itself, ultimately supplanting the shade-intolerant Avicennia and Sonneratia. Then Rhizophora apiculata and Bruguiera parviflora, (and occasionally Bruguiera gymnorhiza) are the next in succession but still in waters that are more than 10% saline. Mature mangrove forests include Xylocarpus, Lumnitzera, and Heritiera. Papuan mahogany Xylocarpus granatum can form monotypic stands, reaching up to 20 meters in height, with buttressed trunks up to a meter across.

Where freshwater flows create a less salty brackish environment the mangrove palm Nypa fruticans is common, together with Xylocarpus granatum and Heritiera littoralis. Mangrove forests bordering freshwater swamp forests include Bruguiera sexangula, Camptostemon schultzii, Dolichandrone spathacea, Diospyros spp., Excoecaria agallocha, Heritiera littoralis, Rhizophora apiculata, and Xylocarpus granatum, along with typical freshwater swamp forest species, such as Calophyllum spp., Kwila (Intsia bijuga), Myristica hollrungii, and Amoora cucullata.

Over 30 species of mangroves have been recorded in Bintuni Bay, and undisturbed mangrove stands can grow up to 30 metres tall.

== Fauna ==
These continuously changing woodlands do not have a great variety of mammals, although the greater sheath-tailed bat (Emballonura furax) is a near-endemic. Many species of birds also inhabit these forests including the New Guinea flightless rail, while endemic or near-endemic birds include the red-billed brush-turkey, Wallace's fruit-dove, western crowned pigeon, Salvadori's fig parrot, black lory, brown lory, Papuan swiftlet, red-breasted paradise-kingfisher, white-bellied pitohui, and the olive-crowned flowerpecker. Reptiles recorded from the New Guinea mangroves on Daru and Bobo (Bristow) Islands, Western Province, PNG, during survey work were the estuarine crocodile (Crocodylus porosus), littoral skink (Emoia atrocostata), mangrove monitor (Varanus indicus), amethystine python (Morelia amethistina), crab-eating mangrove snake (Fordonia leucobalia), and Richardson's mangrove snake (Myron richardsonii). All are species strongly associated with southern New Guinea mangroves.

== Ecological importance ==
Mangrove forests act as a "natural cleaner". For example, they intercept land-derived nutrients, pollutants, and suspended matter before these contaminants reach deeper water. They also prevent coastal erosion by stabilizing sediments provide nursery and spawning areas for commercially important fish and provide stop over sites for organisms such as migratory birds, mammals, and fish.

== Threats and preservation ==
Even though this thick forest is hard to penetrate about 35% of the mangrove forests have been lost in the past two decades. These losses exceed those for tropical rain forests and coral reefs. Mangrove trees grow on a narrow strip between land and ocean in river systems, between the latitudes 25 degrees N and 30 degrees S, and the constant renewal of the trees relies on rivers bringing nutrients to the coast in regular seasonal patterns. The limited distribution of this ecosystem adds to the delicacy of it. Many global changes such as an increased rise in sea water is largely thought to be responsible for the destruction of these mangrove forests. A few other factors such as mariculture, agriculture, and urbanization have also contributed to the recent loss of mangrove habitats. Mangroves provide humans with shrimp, fish, honey, lumber, and reptile skins. Without this tropical habitat, many of these products would be reduced in our market.

Threats to mangroves in Bintuni Bay and on Daru and Bobo (Bristow) Islands, Western Province, PNG, includes cutting for firewood and charcoal burning. Cutters travel by canoe up creeks into the interior of the mangrove forest and clear-fell large areas of trees which from the outside appear untouched. The timber is sold in the market on Daru, an island which is home to 10% of the Western Province population i.e. some 15,000 people including immigrants from Indonesian New Guinea (Papua). It is doubtful the mangrove forests can sustain this level of harvesting. Kwila (Intsia bijuga) and Papuan mahogany have more valuable timber and so are more vulnerable.

Many steps around the world are being taken in an effort to conserve mangrove forests from being completely wiped out. Some of these efforts include replanting of trees by local communities, and the development of sustainable use systems within a community. This practice includes using resources from mangroves that is at a rate in which the ecosystem can recover. Meanwhile, there are four protected areas that include some coastal mangroves: Bintuni Bay Nature Reserve, Lorentz National Park and the Pulau Kimaam Wildlife Reserve in Indonesia and the Kikori Integrated Conservation and Development Project in Papua New Guinea.
