= Trans-Fly savanna and grasslands =

Ecoregion in New Guinea

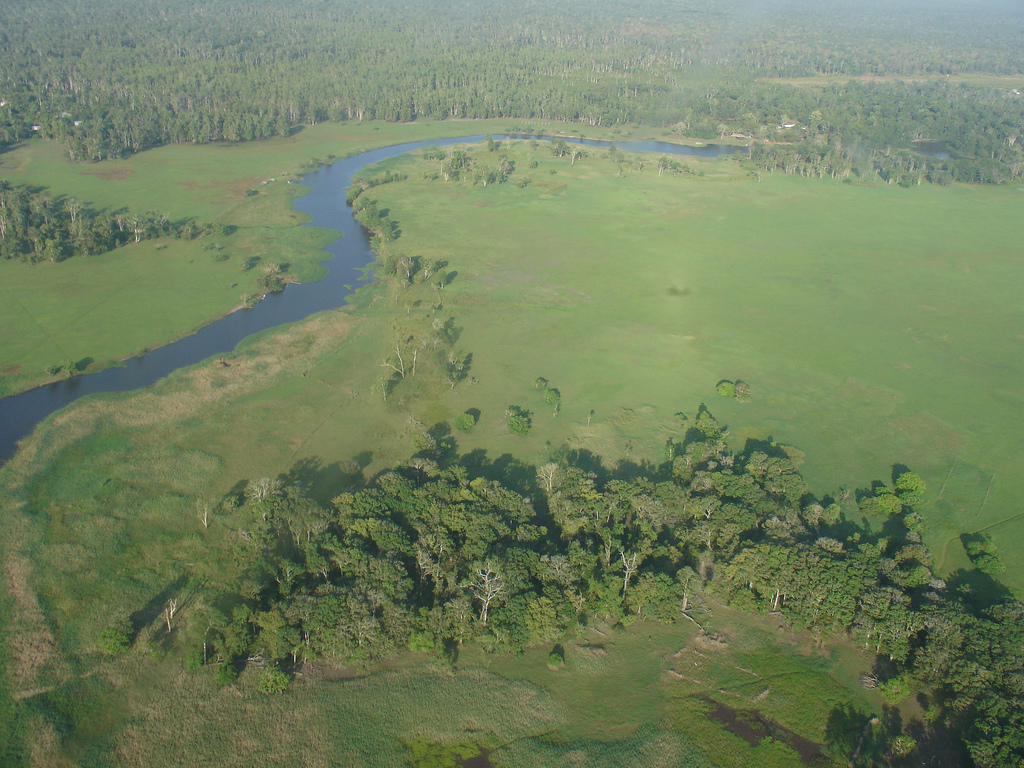
- The Trans-Fly savanna in Papua New Guinea

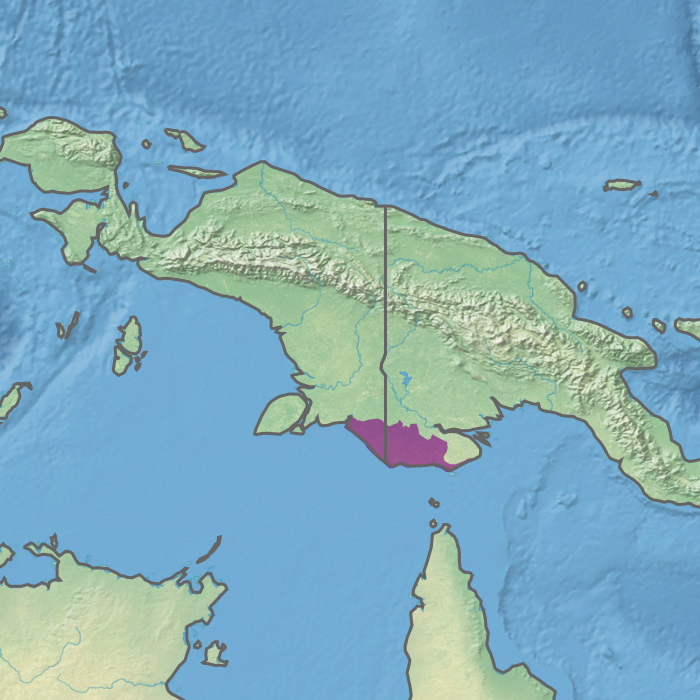
- Ecoregion territory (in purple)

Ecology
- Realm: Australasian
- Biome: tropical and subtropical grasslands, savannas, and shrublands
- Borders: New Guinea mangroves; Southern New Guinea freshwater swamp forests, Southern New Guinea lowland rain forests

Geography
- Area: 26,539 km^{2} (10,247 mi^{2})
- Countries: Indonesia; Papua New Guinea
- Coordinates: 8.9°S 141°E

Conservation
- Conservation status: Relatively stable/intact
- Protected: 10419 km^{2} (39%)

The Trans Fly savanna and grasslands are a lowland ecoregion on the south coast of the island of New Guinea in both the Indonesian and Papua New Guinean sides of the island. With their monsoon and dry season climate these grasslands are quite different from the tropical rainforest that covers most of the island and resemble the landscape of northern Australia which lies to the south.

The name refers to the Fly River.

== History ==
From possibly as early as the 16th century, merchants from Makassar, Seram and other parts of Indonesia conducted trade with the natives of the region's coast. Although trading contacts between the Southeast Asian merchants and the natives became more infrequent as time passed, there was a continued presence of traders in the region as late as the 1870's. Many of the native tribes obtained iron tools through this trade some time before the first European missionaries arrived in the area in the late 19th century.

== Flora ==
The area is mostly grassland that resembles nearby northern Australia and contains areas of Eucalyptus, Albizzia, and Melaleuca woodland. The grasslands are renewed by regular fires at the end of the dry season.

The majority of the terrain consists of grasslands and savannas, although there are patches of dry evergreen forest. The diverse habitats in the region are influenced by factors such as seasonal rainfall, local topography, water drainage, and the burning practices of the local population. In areas that experience flooding during the wet season, Melaleuca forest predominates. The bamboo species Schizistachyum can be found between the adjacent forests and the savanna vegetation in the monsoonal area.

== Fauna ==
While the grasslands are not as rich in wildlife as the rainforests of New Guinea, they are home to a number of endemic species. Mammals of the area include the New Guinean planigale (Planigale novaeguineae), bronze quoll (Dasyurus spartacus), spectacled hare-wallaby (Lagorchestes conspicillatus) and dusky pademelon (Thylogale brunii). Birds of the area include the Fly River grassbird (Megalurus albolimbatus) and the spangled kookaburra, a famous relative of the kingfisher which feeds on rodents and reptiles. The area has an important number of reptiles and amphibians including the unique pig-nosed turtle (Carettochelys insculpta).

== Threats and preservation ==
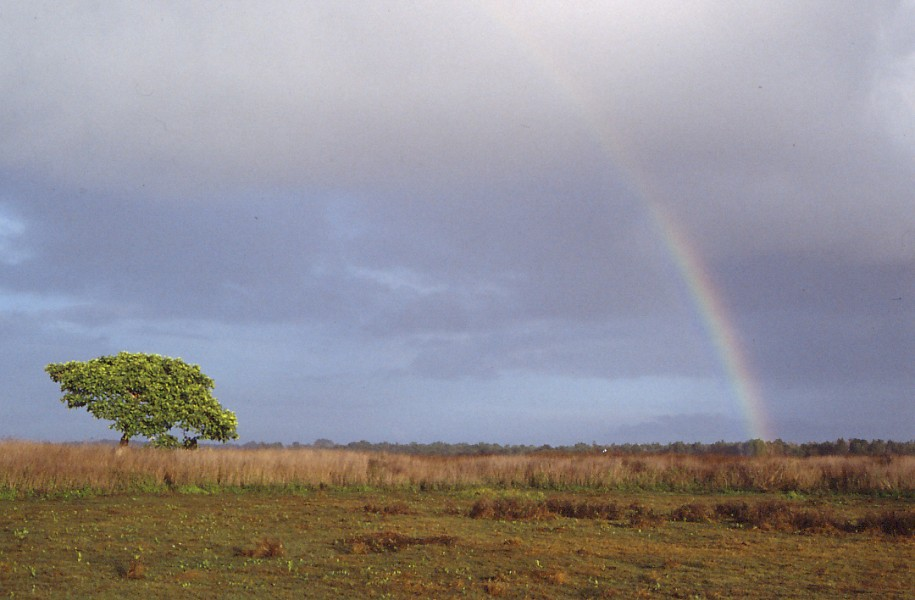
Trans Fly savanna and grasslands in Wasur National Park, Indonesia

This is a remote area with a large but very localised tribal population. Most habitats are intact although wildlife is vulnerable to collection, hunting and damage by logging and woodland clearance, especially as people migrate into the area on the Indonesian side. The grasslands are also modified by grazing of the introduced Javan rusa deer (Cervus timorensis). A third of the region is protected, particularly in Indonesia's large Wasur National Park on the coast and the adjoining Tonda Wildlife Management Area across the border in Papua New Guinea.

== See also ==
- Western Province (Papua New Guinea)
- Bensbach River
- Morehead River
