= Southern New Guinea lowland rain forests =

Ecoregion in New Guinea

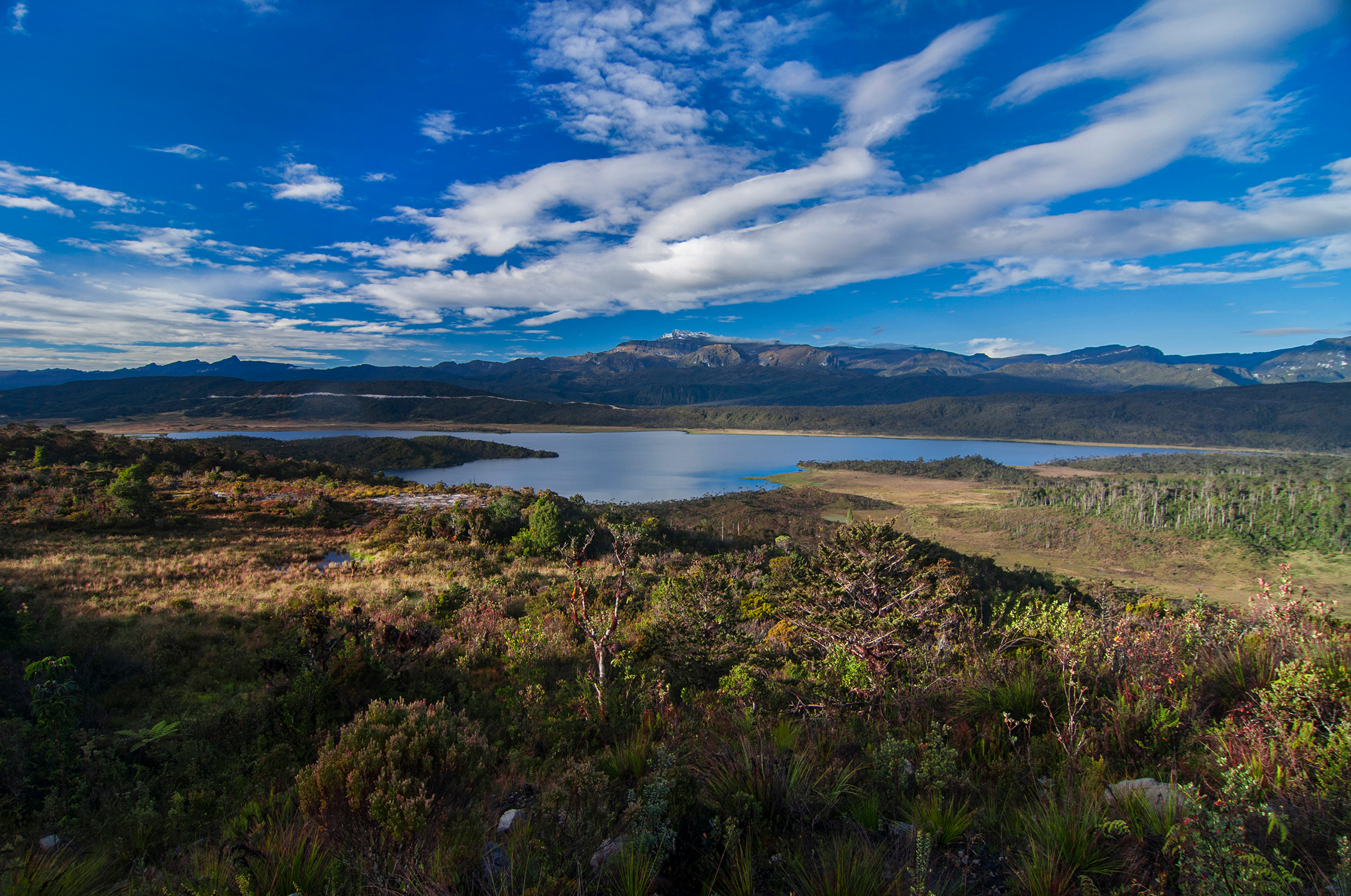
- Lorentz National Park, Papua, Indonesia

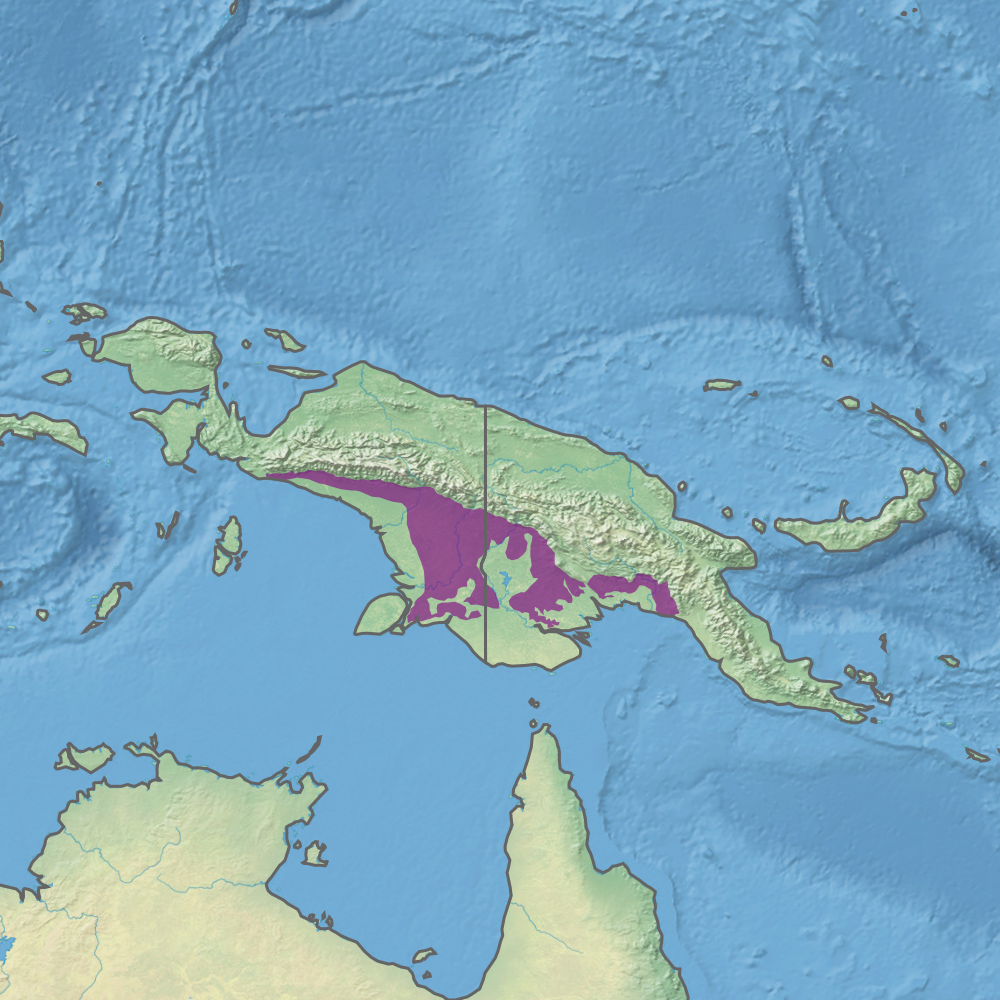
- Ecoregion territory (in purple)

Ecology
- Realm: Australasian realm
- Biome: tropical and subtropical moist broadleaf forests
- Borders: List: Central Range montane rain forests; New Guinea mangroves; Southeastern Papuan rain forests, Southern New Guinea freshwater swamp forests; Trans-Fly savanna and grasslands

Geography
- Area: 122,335 km^{2} (47,234 mi^{2})
- Countries: Indonesia; Papua New Guinea
- Provinces: Central Papua; South Papua (Indonesia); Gulf; Southern Highlands, Western (Papua New Guinea)
- Coordinates: 6.1°S 140.2°E

Conservation
- Conservation status: Critical/endangered
- Protected: 5,841 km^{2} (5%)

The Southern New Guinea lowland rain forests is a tropical moist forest ecoregion in southeastern New Guinea. The ecoregion covers portions of New Guinea's southern lowlands.

== Geography ==
The ecoregion includes the foothills and lowlands south of New Guinea's Central Range. Above 1000 meters elevation, the lowland forests transition to the Central Range montane rain forests. The Southern New Guinea freshwater swamp forests ecoregion covers extensive areas of the Fly River lowlands to the south, and the lower reaches of some other rivers that drain from the highlands to the sea. The Trans-Fly savanna and grasslands cover the southern tip of New Guinea.

== Climate ==
The ecoregion has a humid tropical climate. The slopes of the Central Range above 100 meters elevation include some of the rainiest portions of New Guinea.

== Flora ==
Broadleaf evergreen rain forests cover most of the ecoregion. Alluvial forests lie in the plains, and hill forests cover the foothills of the Central Range. There are smaller areas of semi-evergreen forest, swamp forest, and savanna.

== Fauna ==
The ecoregion has 69 species of mammals, principally marsupials, bats, and murid rodents. There are no strict endemic species. There are 344 species of birds in the ecoregion.

The largest bird in the ecoregion is the flightless southern cassowary (Casuarius casuarius).

== Protected areas ==
A 2017 assessment found that 5,841 km^{2}, or 5%, of the ecoregion is in protected areas. About three-quarters of the ecoregion is still forested. The large area protected by the Lorentz National Park.
