= Central Range sub-alpine grasslands =

Ecoregion on New Guinea island, Indonesia

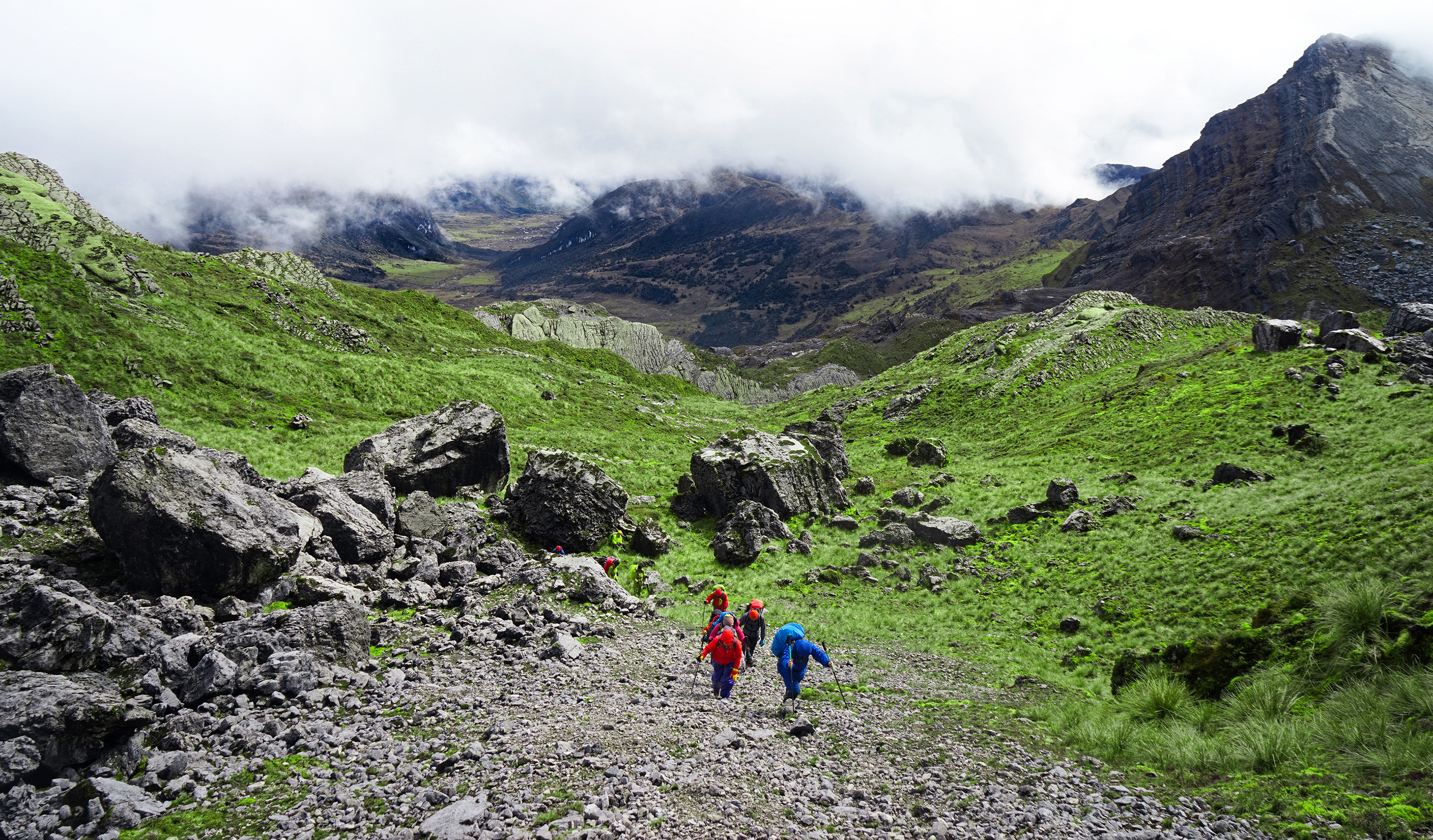
- Lorentz National Park, Central Papua, Indonesia

- Location of the Central Range sub-alpine grasslands (in purple)

Ecology
- Realm: Australasian realm
- Biome: Montane grasslands and shrublands
- Borders: Central Range montane rain forests; Huon Peninsula montane rain forests; Southeastern Papuan rain forests

Geography
- Area: 15,503 km^{2} (5,986 mi^{2})
- Countries: Indonesia; Papua New Guinea
- Province: Papua
- Coordinates: 4.1°S 138.14°E

Conservation
- Conservation status: Relatively stable/intact
- Protected: 40.25%

The Central Range sub-alpine grasslands is a montane grasslands and shrublands ecoregion on the island of New Guinea. The ecoregion covers the highest-elevation portions of the New Guinea Highlands, which extend along the spine of the island. The high elevations support rare tropical sub-alpine and alpine habitats, including many endemic plants and animals.

== Geography ==
The ecoregion includes isolated areas above 3000 metres elevation in the Central Range, or Central Cordillera, of New Guinea, and some outliers in the mountains of the Huon Peninsula. The Central Range extends east and west across New Guinea, with the western portion of the range in Indonesia and the eastern portion in Papua New Guinea. High-elevation areas in the highlands include the Snow Mountains in Indonesia's Papua Province, the Star Mountains on the Indonesia–Papua New Guinea border, the Central and Eastern Highlands of Papua New Guinea, and the Owen Stanley Range in Southeastern Papua.

Below 3000 metres elevation, the sub-alpine grasslands transition to montane rain forests - the Central Range montane rain forests along most of the Central Range, the Southeastern Papuan rain forests in the southeast (Owen Stanley Range), and the Huon Peninsula montane rain forests on the Huon Peninsula.

== Flora ==
Plant communities in the ecoregion include sub-alpine grasslands, shrublands, heathlands, and alpine grasslands.

High mountain forests lie below the tree line, made up of conifers – species of Podocarpus, Dacrycarpus, Dacridium, Papuacedrus, Araucaria, and Libocedrus - and broadleaf trees in the myrtle family. The high mountain forests typically have a low, thin canopy and prominent understory. The tree line is approximately 3000 metres in elevation, which is the upper boundary of the Central Range montane rain forests ecoregion, but in places, forests extend up to 3900 metres.

Sub-alpine communities include shrubby heaths of Rhododendron, Vaccinium, Coprosma, Myrsine, and Saurauia at the forest edges, savannas of tree ferns (Cyathea spp.) above grasses, bogs, and grasslands. Low shrublands and Deschampsia tussock grasslands occur immediately below the alpine zone.

Alpine communities occur above 4000 metres and are composed of compact herbs, including species of Ranunculus, Potentilla, Gentiana, and Epilobium; grasses, including species of Poa and Deschampsia; ferns, mosses; and lichens. Rosette plants and cushion herbs, low ferns, mosses, and lichens become more abundant at increasing elevations and replace grasses above 4,300 metres elevation. Permanent ice, snow, and bare rock are found at the highest elevations.

== Fauna ==
Only ten mammals are native to the ecoregion. These include three marsupials (Doria's tree kangaroo, (Dendrolagus dorianus), a black-tailed dasyure (Murexia melanurus), and a cuscus), four murid rodents (the western shrew mouse (Pseudohydromys occidentalis), glacier rat (Rattus richardsoni), and alpine woolly rat (Mallomys gunung), and one other), two Microchiropteran bats, and the New Guinea singing dog (Canis familiaris). The western shrew mouse, glacier rat, and alpine wooly rat are endemic to the ecoregion.

There are 84 native bird species in the ecoregion. Four species are strictly endemic – the Snow Mountain quail (Anurophasis monorthonyx), Snow Mountain robin (Petroica archboldi), Short-bearded honeyeater (Melidectes nouhuysi), and Long-bearded honeyeater (Melidectes princeps).

Another 20 limited-range bird species inhabit the ecoregion and the adjacent lower-elevation montane forests. These limited-range species include the painted tiger parrot (Psittacella picta), Archbold's owlet-nightjar (Aegotheles archboldi), Alpine pipit (Anthus gutturalis), Papuan thornbill (Acanthiza murina), greater ground robin (Amalocichla sclateriana), Alpine robin (Petroica bivittata), blue-capped ifrita (Ifrita kowaldi), black sittella (Daphoenositta miranda), Lorentz's whistler (Pachycephala lorentzi), orange-cheeked honeyeater (Oreornis chrysogenys), Huon honeyeater (Melidectes foersteri), spangled honeyeater (Melipotes ater), sooty honeyeater (Melidectes fuscus), Belford's honeyeater (Melidectes belfordi), rufous-backed honeyeater (Ptiloprora guisei), black-backed honeyeater (Ptiloprora perstriata), mountain firetail (Oreostruthus fuliginosus), red satinbird (Cnemophilus sanguineus), MacGregor's bird of paradise (Macgregoria pulchra), brown sicklebill (Epimachus meyeri), Princess Stephanie's astrapia (Astrapia stephaniae), splendid astrapia (Astrapia splendidissima), ribbon-tailed astrapia (Astrapia mayeri), and Huon astrapia (Astrapia rothschildi).

== Protected areas ==
40.25% of the ecoregion is in protected areas. These include Lorentz National Park, Enarotali Nature Reserve, Pegunungan Wayland Nature Reserve, Pegunungan Jayawijaya Wildlife Reserve, Mount Wilhelm National Park, and YUS Conservation Area.

== See also ==
- List of highest mountains of New Guinea
