= Southern New Guinea freshwater swamp forests =

Ecoregion in New Guinea

Southern New Guinea lowland rain forests
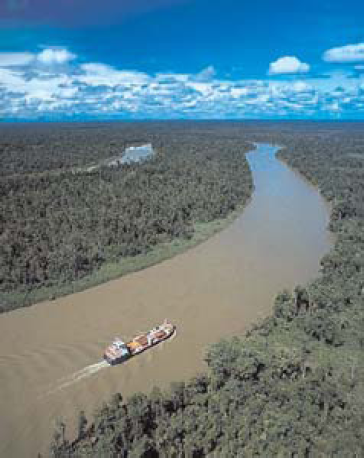
- Fly River, Papua New Guinea

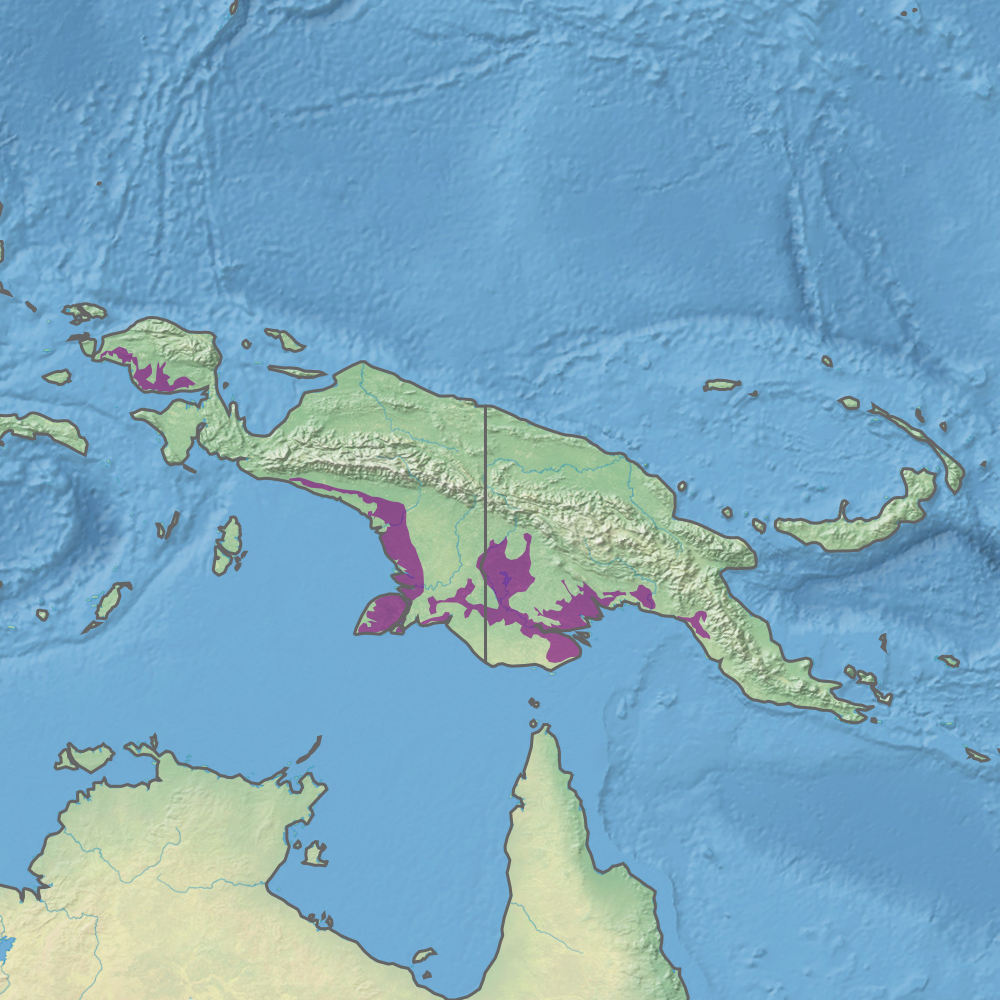
- Ecoregion territory (in purple)

Ecology
- Realm: Australasian realm
- Biome: tropical and subtropical moist broadleaf forests
- Borders: List: New Guinea mangroves; Southeastern Papuan rain forests, Southern New Guinea lowland rain forests; Trans-Fly savanna and grasslands; Vogelkop-Aru lowland rain forests

Geography
- Area: 99,022 km^{2} (38,233 mi^{2})
- Countries: Indonesia; Papua New Guinea
- Provinces: Central Papua; South Papua; Southwest Papua; West Papua (Indonesia); Central; Gulf; Western (Papua New Guinea)
- Coordinates: 7°S 141.38°E

Conservation
- Conservation status: Relatively stable/intact
- Protected: 8,583 km² (9%)

The Southern New Guinea freshwater swamp forests is a tropical moist forest ecoregion in southern New Guinea. The ecoregion includes the extensive swamp forests of southern and western New Guinea.

== Geography ==
New Guinea is home to extensive swamp forests. These forests are permanently waterlogged or seasonally inundated during the rainy season. The Southern New Guinea freshwater swamp forests extend from the western Bird's Head Peninsula to the Papuan Peninsula in the southeast. The forests lie in the lower reaches of the rivers that drain New Guinea's highlands. The most extensive swamp forests are in the basin of the Fly River.

The Southern New Guinea lowland rain forests and Vogelkop-Aru lowland rain forests ecoregions occupy the adjacent lowlands. Near the coast the freshwater swamp forests transition to New Guinea mangroves as the waters become brackish or salt.

== Climate ==
The ecoregion has a humid tropical climate.

== Flora ==
The freshwater swamp forests support diverse habitats, from open water to grass swamps of several types (dominated by Leersia, Saccharum-Phragmites, Pseudoraphis, or mixed swamps with no dominant plant), swamp savannas (Melaleuca-dominated or mixed), swamp woodlands (dominated by sago palm (Metroxylon sagu), Pandanus, or mixed), and swamp forests dominated by Campnosperma, Terminalia, or Melaleuca.

== Fauna ==
The ecoregion is home to fifty mammal species, including marsupials, bats, and murid rodents. There is one endemic mammal species, the Fly River water rat (Leptomys signatus).

The ecoregion has 339 species of birds, including resident and migratory birds. The ecoregion's lakes and wetlands support large populations of water birds.

== Protected areas ==
A 2017 assessment found that 8,583 km², or 9%, of the ecoregion is in protected areas. Over 80% of the ecoregion has relatively intact vegetation.
