= Southeastern Papuan rain forests =

Terrestrial ecoregion in New Guinea

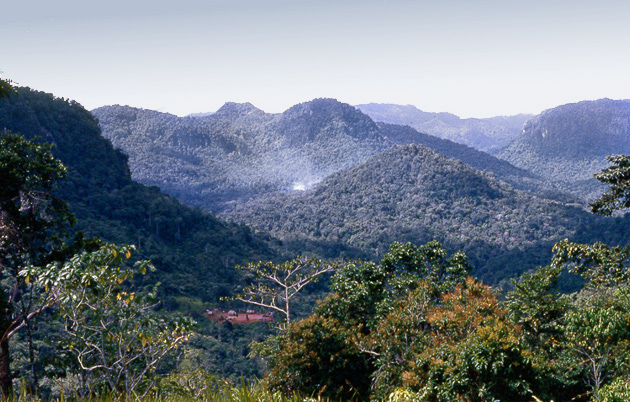
- Owen Stanley Range

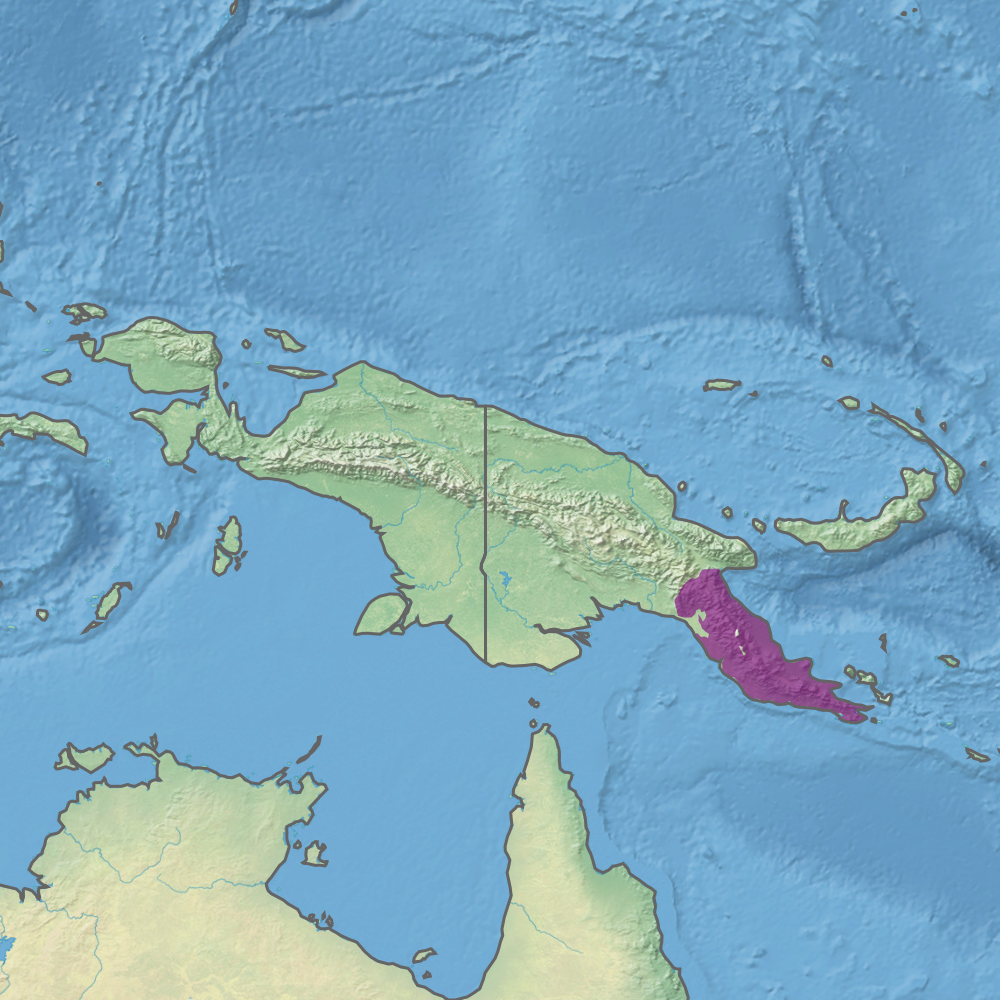
- Ecoregion territory (in purple)

Ecology
- Realm: Australasian realm
- Biome: tropical and subtropical moist broadleaf forests
- Borders: Central Range montane rain forests; New Guinea mangroves; Northern New Guinea lowland rain and freshwater swamp forests, Southern New Guinea lowland rain forests

Geography
- Area: 76,808 km^{2} (29,656 mi^{2})
- Countries: Papua New Guinea
- Provinces: Central; Gulf; Milne Bay; Morobe, Oro
- Coordinates: 9.0°S 147.85°E

Conservation
- Conservation status: Relatively stable/intact
- Protected: 830 km² (1%)

The Southeastern Papuan rain forests is a tropical moist forest ecoregion in southeastern New Guinea. The ecoregion covers the mountainous center and coastal lowlands of the Papuan Peninsula.

== Geography ==
The mountains that run the length of the peninsula are the eastern extension of the mountainous spine that runs the length of New Guinea. The Watut-Tauri Gap separates the southeastern ranges, including the Owen Stanley Range, from the mountains of Central New Guinea. Mount Victoria (4,038 m) in the Owen Stanley Range is the ecoregion's highest peak.

The collision of the Owen Stanley Range is made up mostly of continentally-derived metamorphic rocks overlain by basaltic volcanic rocks. The Bowutu Mountains and eastern Kuper Range consist of ultramafic rocks derived from oceanic crust and upper mantle. This formation is known as the Bowutu Ultramafic Belt or Papuan Ultramafic Belt.

== Climate ==
The climate of the ecoregion varies with elevation. The lowlands are humid and tropical. Average temperatures decrease with elevation, and the highest portions of the Owen Stanley Range experience regular freezing temperatures.

== Flora ==
The ecoregion's natural vegetation is humid evergreen rain forests. The forest types include alluvial rain forest on lowland plains, hill forests at the foot of the mountains, montane forests above 1000 meters, upper montane forests, and high mountain forests below the tree line. The highest peaks of the Owen Stanley Range are home to sub-alpine grasslands and shrublands, which are included in the separate Central Range sub-alpine grasslands ecoregion.

Distinctive plant genera of southeastern Papuan region include Magodendron, Anthorrhiza, Kairoa, and Cephalohibiscus.

== Fauna ==
There are 138 species of mammals in the ecoregion, mostly marsupials, bats, and murid rodents. Seven mammal species are endemic: broad-striped dasyure (Paramurexia rothschildi), giant bandicoot (Peroryctes broadbenti), Papuan bandicoot (Microperoryctes papuensis), New Guinea big-eared bat (Pharotis imogene), Chiruromys lamia, Long-nosed mosaic-tailed rat (Melomys levipes), and Van Deusen's rat (Rattus vandeuseni).

The ecoregion is home to 510 species of birds. The largest bird in the ecoregion is the flightless southern cassowary (Casuarius casuarius), which lives in the lowland forests. Four species are endemic to the ecoregion – the brown-headed paradise kingfisher (Tanysiptera danae), grey-headed munia (Lonchura caniceps), streaked bowerbird (Amblyornis subalaris), and eastern parotia (Parotia helenae).

20 species of frogs and 10 species of lizards are endemic to the Bowutu Ultramafic Belt.

== Protected areas ==
A 2017 assessment found that 830 km², or 1%, of the ecoregion is in protected areas. Over 80% of the ecoregion is still forested.
