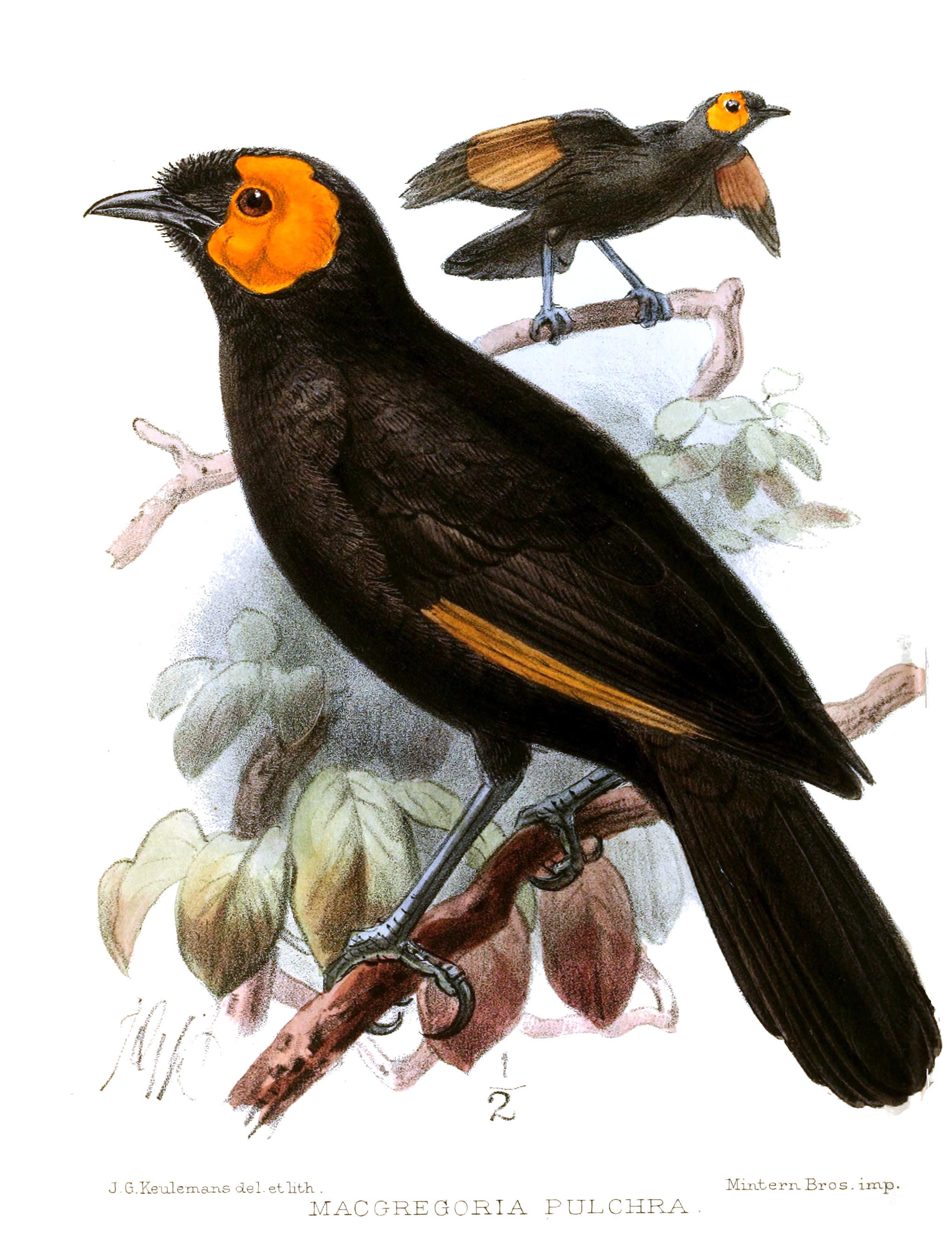

Conservation status
- Vulnerable (IUCN 3.1)

Scientific classification
- Kingdom: Animalia
- Phylum: Chordata
- Class: Aves
- Order: Passeriformes
- Family: Meliphagidae
- Genus: Macgregoria; De Vis, 1897
- Species: M. pulchra

Binomial name
- Macgregoria pulchra De Vis, 1897

= MacGregor's honeyeater =

Species of bird

MacGregor's honeyeater (Macgregoria pulchra), also known as giant wattled honeyeater, MacGregor's giant honeyeater, MacGregor's bird of paradise, and ochre-winged honeyeater, is a large (up to 40 centimetres or 16 inches long), black, crow-like bird with large orange-yellow eye-wattles and black-tipped, ochre primary wing feathers endemic to the island of New Guinea. The sexes are similar, with the male being slightly larger than the female. It is the only member of the genus Macgregoria.

== Taxonomy and classification ==
MacGregor's honeyeater was historically classified as a bird-of-paradise within the family Paradisaeidae due to its striking appearance, colorful facial wattles, and elaborate courtship behavior. Early authors considered it closely allied to Paradigalla, while some later authors even proposed placement among the bowerbirds.

The species was originally described by Charles Walter De Vis in 1897 from specimens collected in southeastern New Guinea. The generic name Macgregoria honors Lady Mary MacGregor, wife of Sir William MacGregor, while the species epithet pulchra derives from the Latin for “beautiful” or “lovely”.

Its systematic placement remained controversial for decades. Some authors noted similarities to birds-of-paradise in plumage structure and behavior, especially to the paradisaeine genera and the cnemophilines. However, later molecular studies demonstrated that Macgregoria is actually a member of the honeyeater family Meliphagidae rather than Paradisaeidae. This relationship also helps explain its specialized frugivorous ecology and several anatomical differences from true birds-of-paradise. It is similar and closely related to the smoky honeyeater.

Two subspecies are generally recognized:

- M. p. pulchra — eastern Papua New Guinea
- M. p. carolinae — western New Guinea and the Star Mountains region

== Distribution and habitat ==
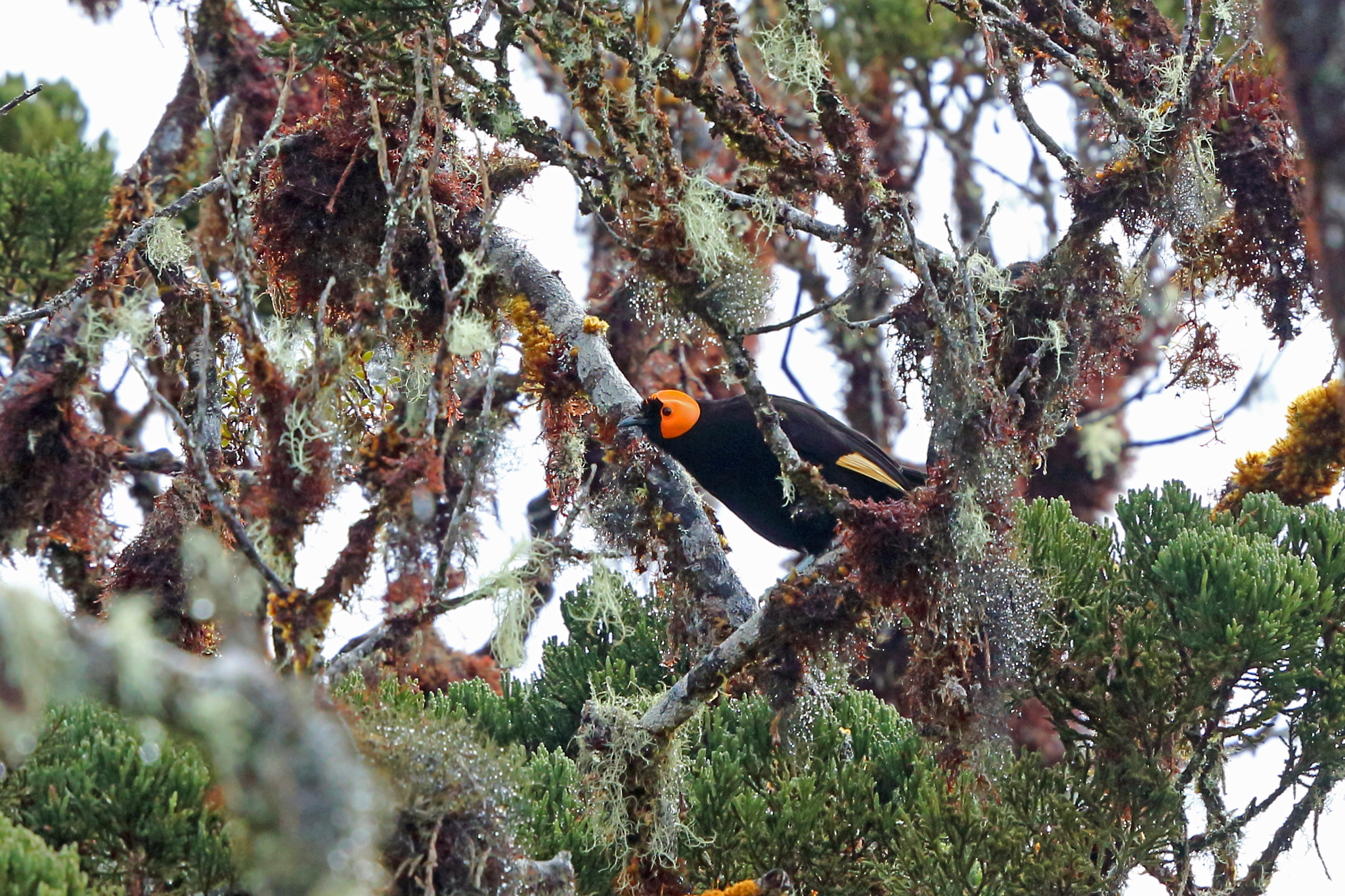
An adult photographed in Western New Guinea, Indonesia.

MacGregor's honeyeater is found on the island of New Guinea, where it inhabits cloud forest and subalpine Dacrycarpus forest at elevations of 2,800–4,000 m (9,200–13,100 ft). It is commonly observed in Dacrycarpus groves when the trees are fruiting, but relatively little is known about where it removes to when the trees are not fruiting.

== Description ==
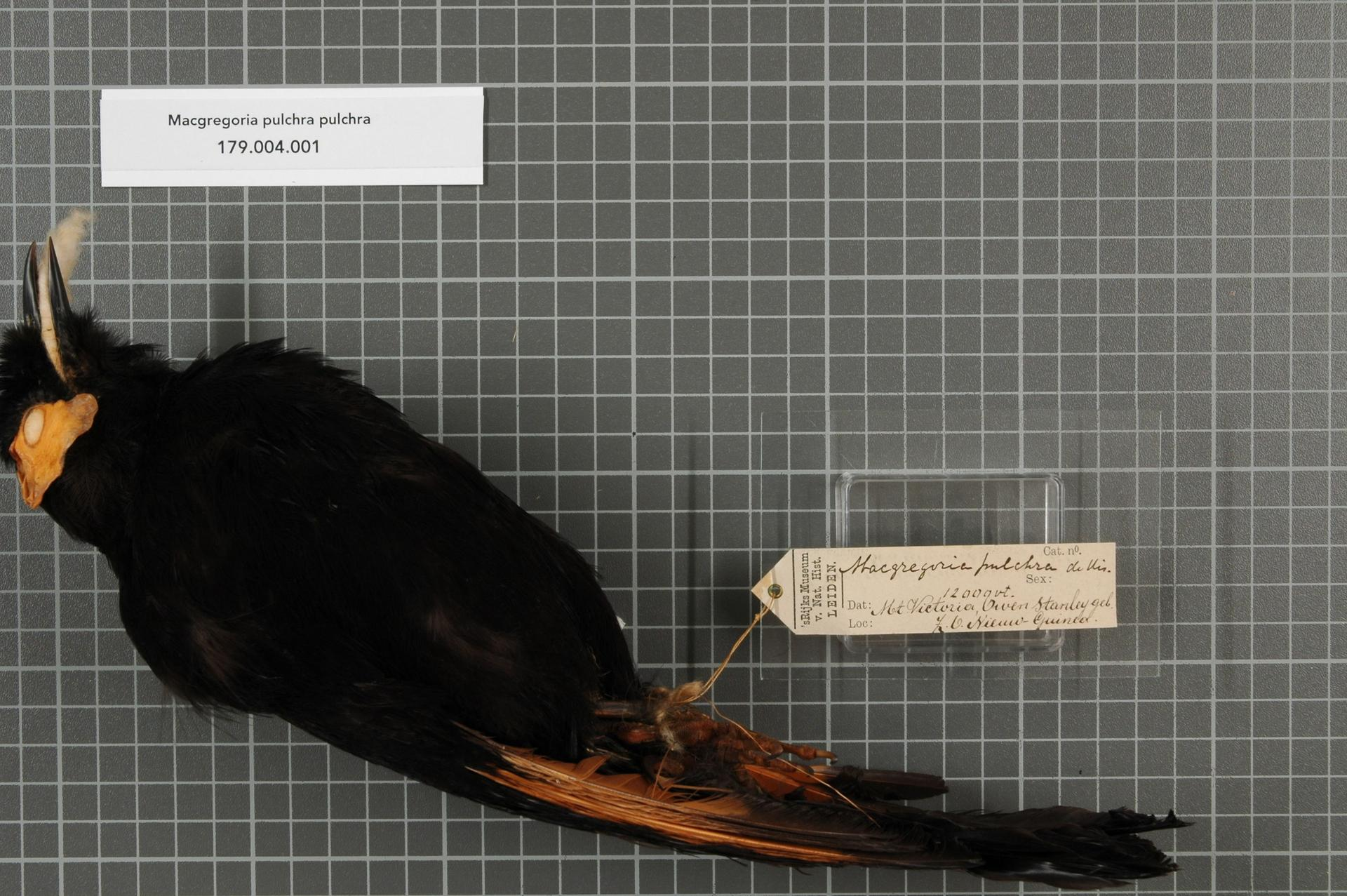
Specimen of a M. p. pulchra adult.

MacGregor's honeyeater is one of the largest members of the honeyeater family. Adult males measure roughly 40 centimetres or 16 inches in length, while females average about 35 to 40 centimetres or 14 to 16 inches. Males typically weigh around 242 to 357 grams (8.5 to 12.6 oz; 0.534 to 0.787 lb) and females slightly less. They are predominantly glossy black with dense, silky plumage and broad, rounded wings. A conspicuous bare, semicircular facial wattle surrounds the eye and varies from yellow-orange to reddish-orange, occasionally deepening in color during courtship activity. The wings display prominent ochre-yellow patches visible both at rest and in flight. The subspecies carolinae is generally larger-bodied, with proportionally smaller wings and tail, and often reduced ochre wing markings.

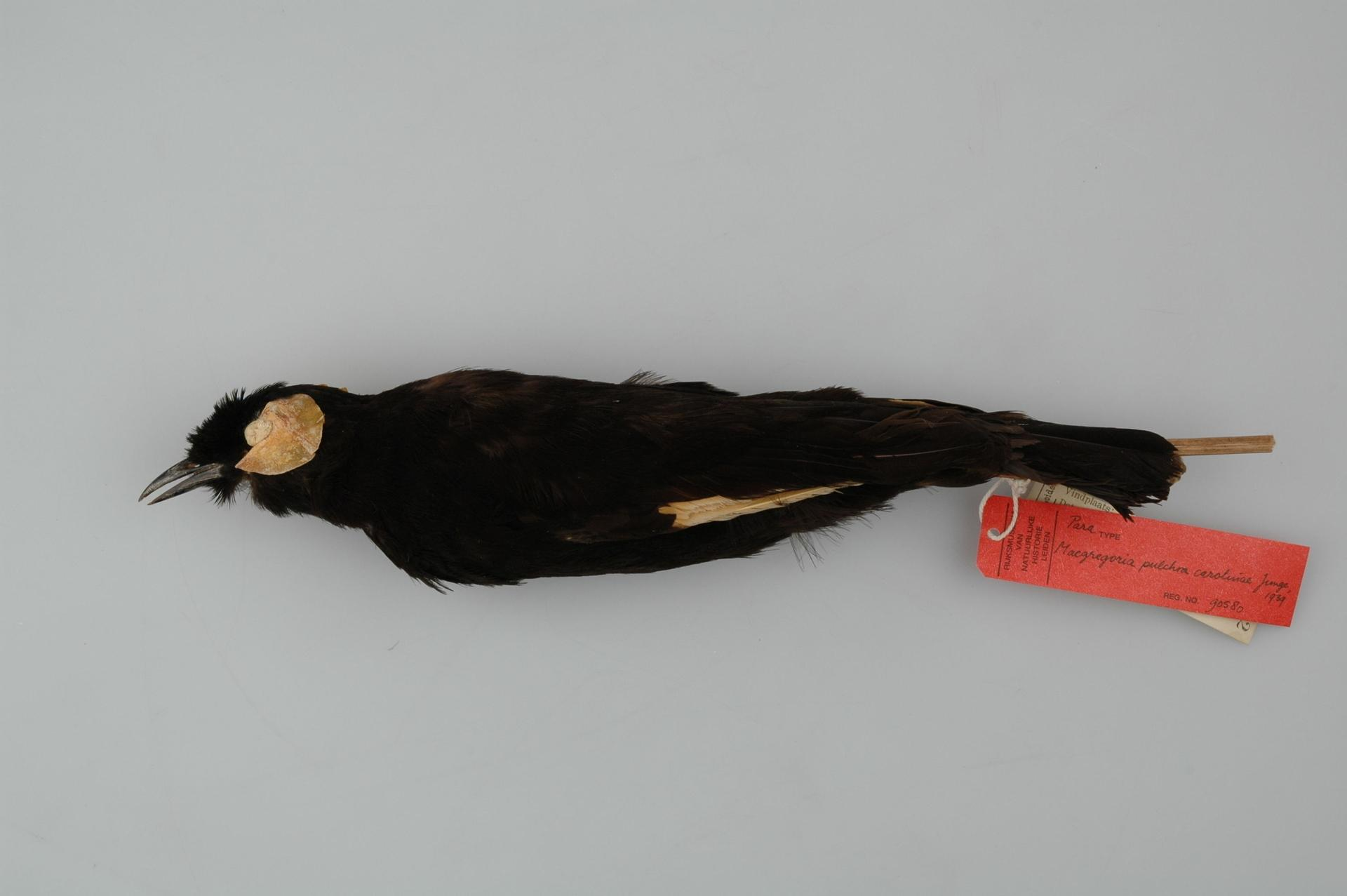
Specimen of a M. p. carolinae female collected from the Jayawijaya Mountains.

The beak is black, heavy, and slightly decurved. Legs are bluish-grey to blackish. Females resemble males but are generally duller, browner below, and possess smaller wattles. Juveniles are softer-textured, browner overall, and have reduced facial wattles and wing markings.

=== Vocalizations ===
The species produces a variety of whistles, nasal notes, clicks, and wheezy calls. One of the most frequently heard vocalizations is a repeated high-pitched whistled “jeet” note used both as a contact and alarm call. Mechanical wing sounds are especially characteristic. During gliding flight the primaries produce loud ripping, rustling, whirring, or “zipping” noises audible over long distances. Observers have suggested the birds may actively control these wing-generated sounds during courtship displays.

== Behavior and ecology ==
=== General habits ===
MacGregor's honeyeater is usually encountered singly, in pairs, or in small family groups. Though often considered sedentary, the species appears partially nomadic, undertaking local movements tied to irregular fruiting events of Dacrycarpus trees. Despite their large size, the birds are agile and active, frequently hopping between branches and making steep gliding descents through forest openings.

=== Reproduction ===
MacGregor's honeyeater is monogamous and largely non-territorial, with pairs maintaining overlapping foraging ranges. Courtship involves hopping chases, aerial pursuits, gliding descents, and conspicuous wing-noise displays. These displays frequently occur near nests under construction and may involve additional birds besides the breeding pair.

The nest is a bulky open cup constructed primarily of moss, woody stems, lichens, orchid stems, and leaves. Nests are generally placed high in podocarp trees or near forest edges adjacent to alpine grasslands. Only a single egg is definitively known. It is described as vinaceous pink with brown and purplish spotting. Incubation is performed solely by the female and likely lasts roughly 26–30 days. Both parents feed the nestling through regurgitation. Nestling development appears unusually slow, likely reflecting both the species’ cold high-elevation environment and fruit-dominated diet.

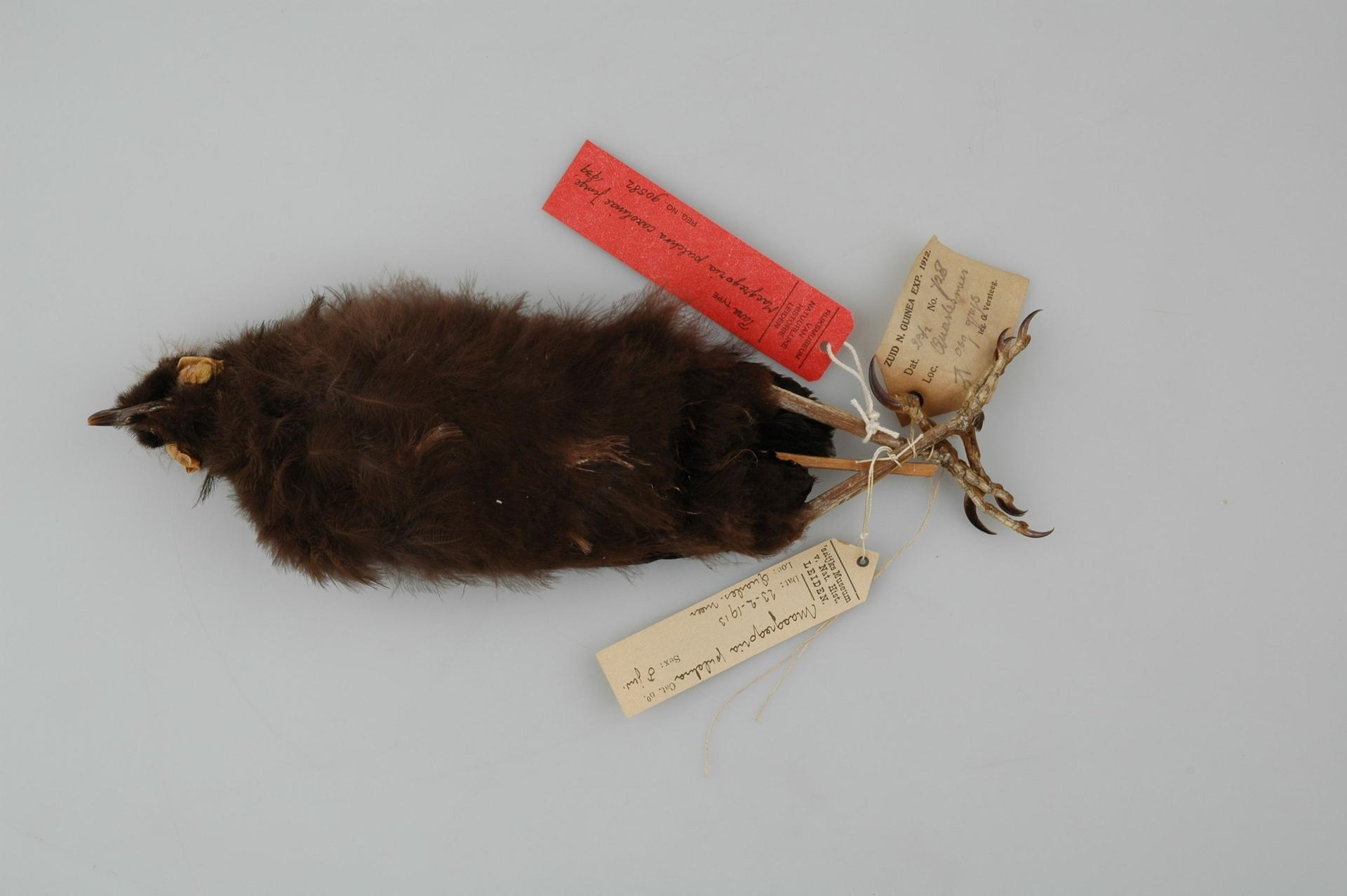
Specimen of an immature bird, already showing developing facial wattles.

=== Diet ===
This species is primarily frugivorous and heavily dependent on Dacrycarpus compactus fruits, which may dominate the diet during periods of abundance. Other fruits consumed include those of Elaeocarpus, Coprosma, Myrsine, Symplocos, and several cushion plants of subalpine grasslands. Animal prey, including arthropods and small vertebrates, also forms part of the diet.

They forage mainly in the canopy but also descend into shrubs, moss, epiphytes, and even onto the ground. It is suggested that the species may employ an “open-bill probing” feeding method similar to some birds-of-paradise.

=== Predators ===
The Papuan harrier is the only confirmed predator of this species, based on remains recovered from the stomach contents of a single individual.

== Status and conservation ==
BirdLife International and the IUCN Red List of Threatened Species classify MacGregor's honeyeater as Vulnerable due to its fragmented range, small population, habitat specialization, and susceptibility to hunting. Population numbers fluctuate substantially with fruiting cycles of Dacrycarpus compactus, causing birds to periodically disappear from some localities for months or even years.

Climate change is considered a major long-term threat because the species is highly dependent on cool subalpine habitats and specialized fruiting systems. Hunting pressure may also contribute to local declines, though in some regions the species is culturally protected and remains relatively confiding toward humans.
