= Lake Mangakaware =

Lake in the North Island of New Zealand

Coordinates: 37°56′01″S 175°13′12″E

Lake Mangakaware is a peat lake in the Waikato region, outside Te Awamutu, in the North Island of New Zealand. It is one of 31 in the region. The lake has a depth of 4.8 metres, and an area of 12.9 hectares. The lake has cultural significance due to a number of archaeological finds close to its waters, including a pā site.

Water quality in the lake has declined, with plants in the lake declining significantly between 2005 and 2010. Volunteers have been seeking to fix this through improving the biodiversity of the surrounding area. Planting days have been organised to establish native plants such as mānuka and kahikatea, and stop the spread of invasive species such as gorse.

== See also ==
- List of lakes of New Zealand
