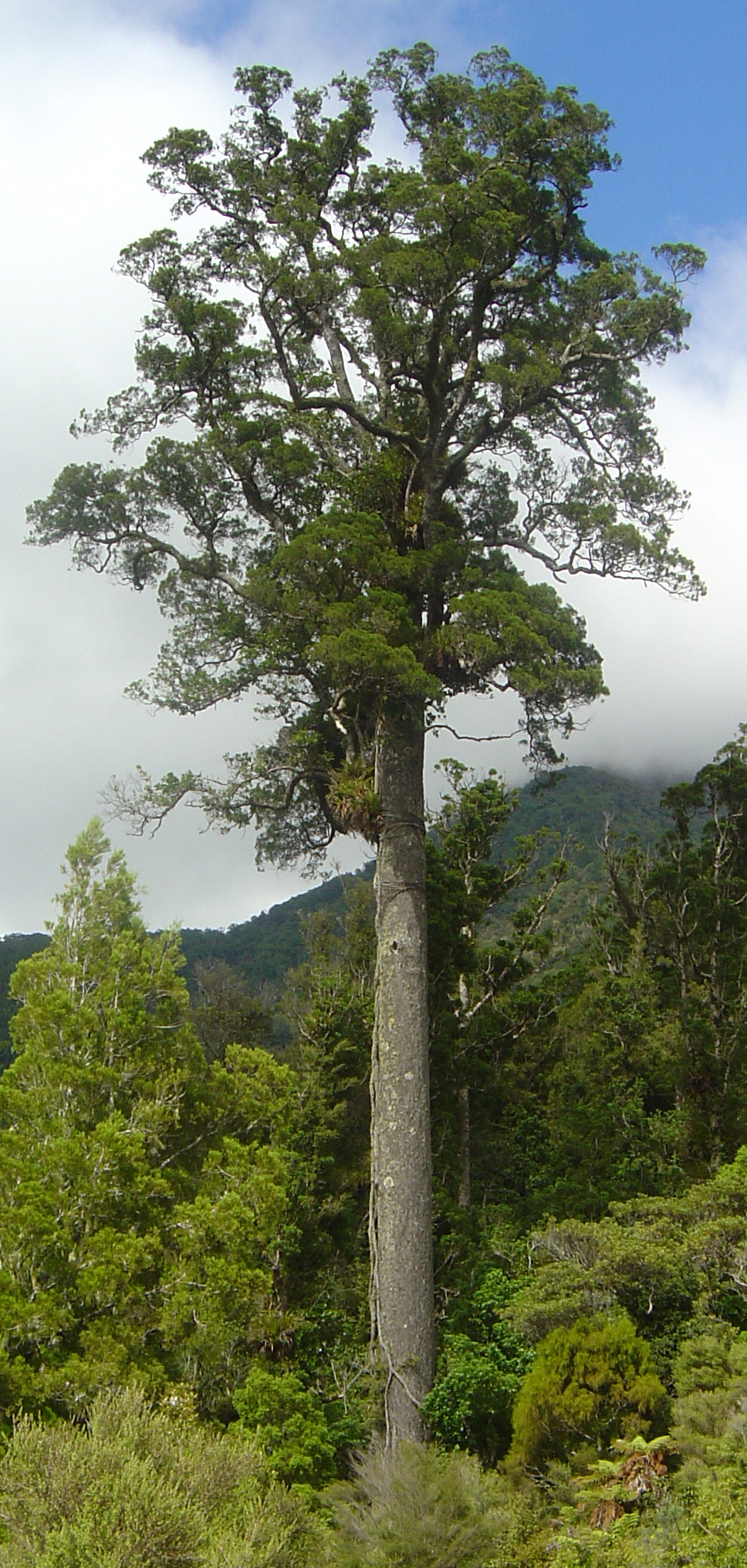
- Mature kahikatea tree

Conservation status
- Least Concern (IUCN 3.1)

Scientific classification
- Kingdom: Plantae
- Clade: Tracheophytes
- Clade: Gymnosperms
- Division: Pinophyta
- Class: Pinopsida
- Order: Araucariales
- Family: Podocarpaceae
- Genus: Dacrycarpus
- Species: D. dacrydioides

Binomial name
- Dacrycarpus dacrydioides (A.Rich.) de Laub.
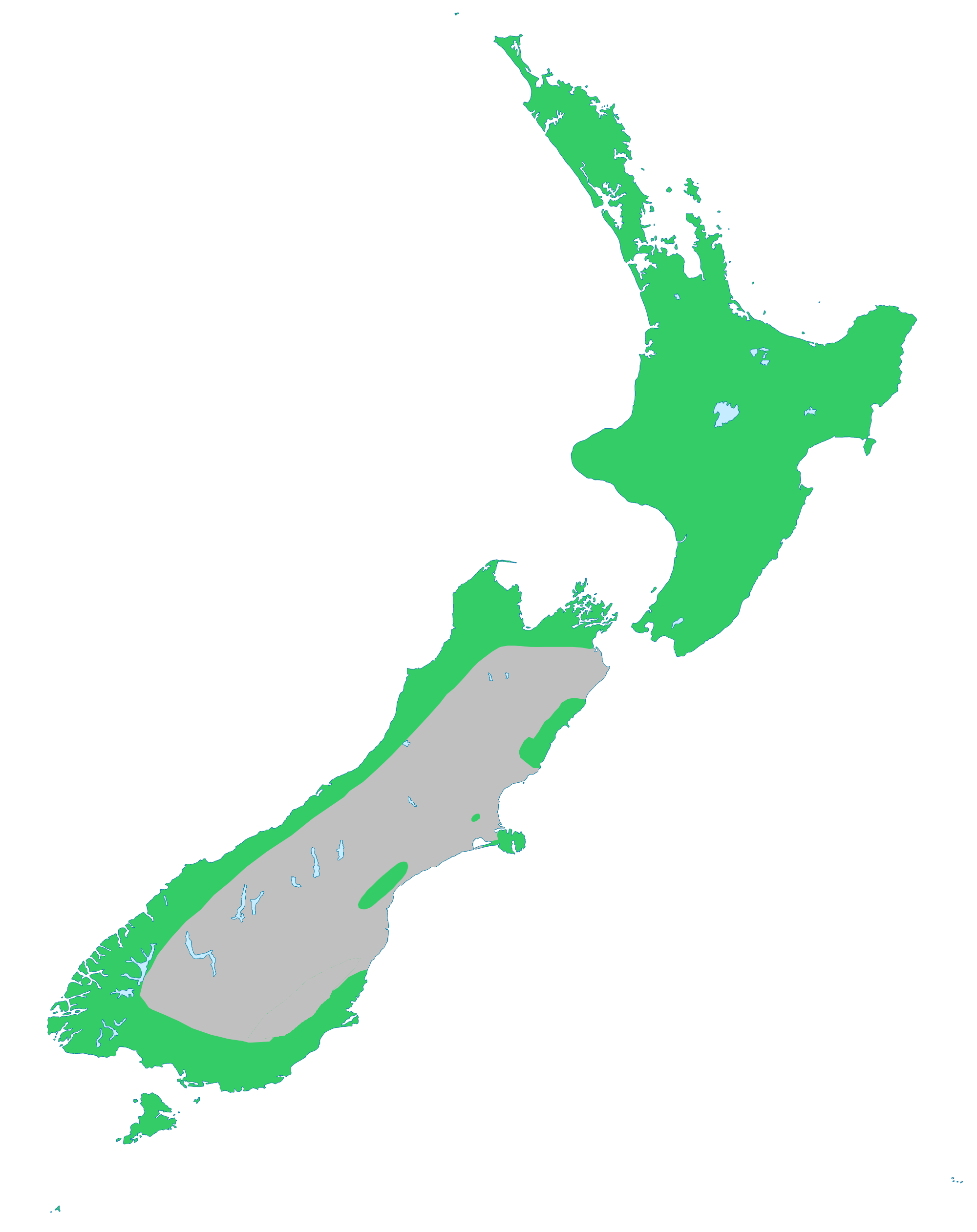
- Natural range of D. dacrydioides

Synonyms
- Alphabetical list: Podocarpus dacrydioides A.Rich.; Dacrycarpus excelsum D.Don in Lamb.; Podocarpus thujoides R.Br. In Bennett; Dacrycarpus thuioides Banks et Solander ex Carr.; Dacrycarpus ferrugineum Houttee ex Gord.; Nageia dacrydioides; Nageia excelsa Kuntze; Podocarpus excelsus (D. Don.) Druce

= Dacrycarpus dacrydioides =

Kahikatea

Coniferous tree endemic to New Zealand

Dacrycarpus dacrydioides, the kahikatea (from Māori) or white pine, is a coniferous tree in the family Podocarpaceae, endemic to New Zealand. It is New Zealand's tallest tree species, gaining heights of 60 metres (200 feet) over a life span of 600 years. It was first described botanically by the French botanist Achille Richard in 1832 as Podocarpus dacrydioides, and was given its current binomial name Dacrycarpus dacrydioides in 1969 by the American botanist David de Laubenfels. Analysis of DNA has confirmed its evolutionary relationship with other species in the genera Dacrycarpus and Dacrydium.

In Māori culture, it is an important source of timber for the building of waka and making of tools, of food in the form of its berries, and of dye. Its use for timber and its damp fertile habitat, ideal for dairy farming, have led to its decimation almost everywhere except South Westland.

Kahikatea seeds have fleshy structures called receptacles attached to them, which encourage birds such as kererū and tūī to eat them and disperse the seeds. The water storage ability of these structures may also act to protect seeds from drying out. It supports many smaller plants in its own branches, which are called epiphytes; 100 different species have been recorded on one tree alone.

== Description ==
Kahikatea is a coniferous tree reaching a height of 50–65 m (164–213 ft), making it the tallest New Zealand tree, with a trunk 1–2 m (3.3–6.6 ft) through. It has a 600 year life span and gains maturity after between 250 and 450 years. Near the base of the tree, the roots are typically buttressed and grooved. Adult trees that grow in clusters develop interlocking root islands that may help prevent individual trees from falling during high winds. The wood itself is odourless and white. The majority of the trunk is branchless—in adults around three quarters—and has grey or dark grey coloured bark which falls off thickly in flakes. Young adults have no branches in a third to a half of the trunk and have a conic shape.

In juveniles the leaves are 3–7 (reaching 4 mm (0.16 in) in young adults) by 0.5–1 mm (0.020–0.039 in) and a dark green to red colour that come to a marked point. They are narrow, arranged in almost opposite pairs spreading away from a wider base, and curved like a scythe. In adulthood the leaves change dramatically and are a brown-green colour and just 1–2 mm (0.039–0.079 in) long, waxy, and grow overlapping one another tightly.

As a conifer, kahikatea has no flowers and instead has cones. Male cones, which occur on different trees to female ones, are 1 cm (0.39 in) long and rectangular. The pollen is a pale yellow colour and has a three-pored or trisaccate shape that is distinctive in the New Zealand flora and so can be identified easily. The fruit is highly modified with a yellow-orange fleshy receptacle that is 2.5–6.5 mm (0.098–0.256 in) long. The purple-black seed is roughly spherical and 4–6 mm (0.16–0.24 in) in diameter. Both the seed and the ovary are covered with a thin layer of wax. Kahikatea has a diploid chromosome count of 20.

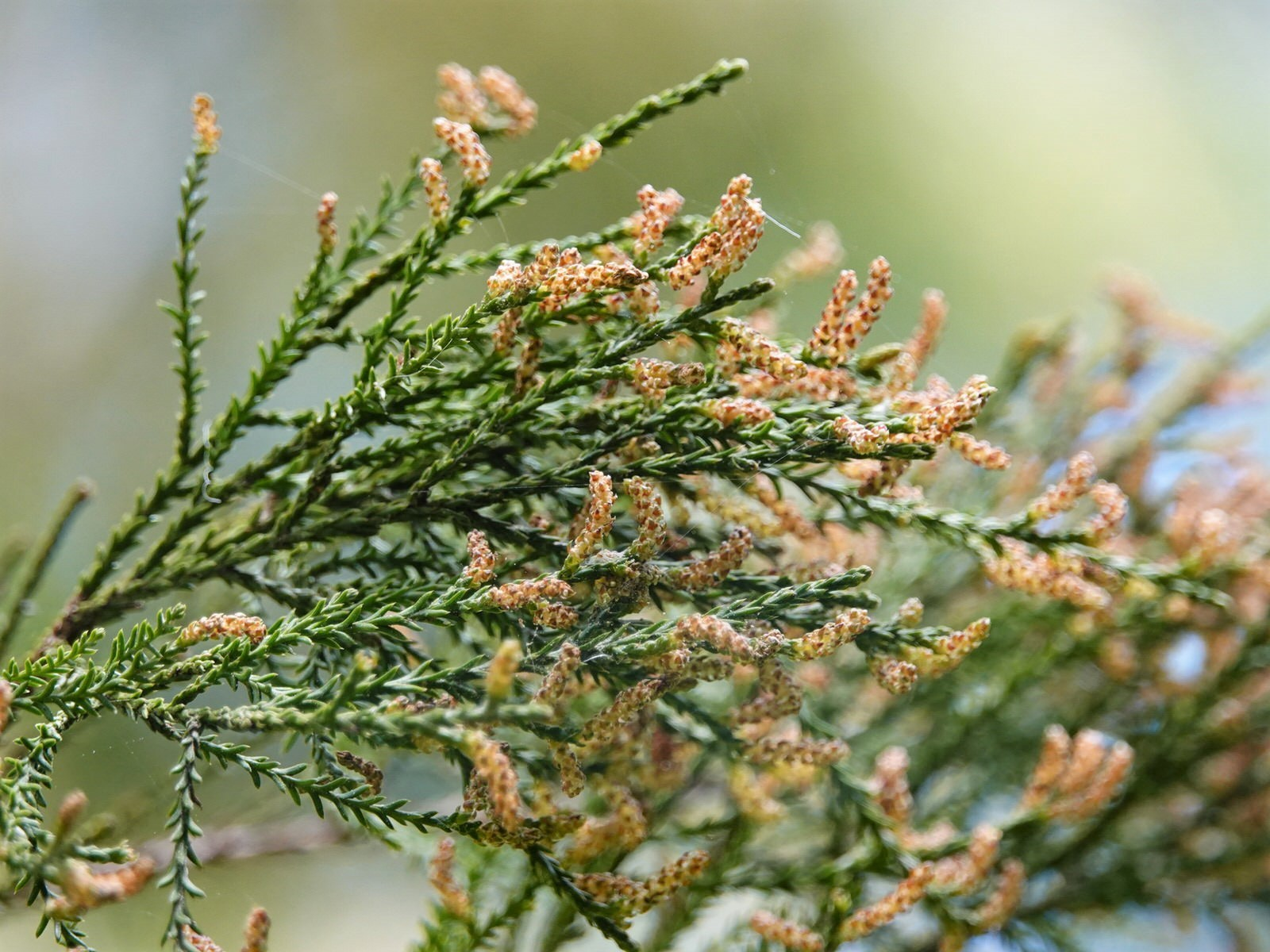
Male cones with pollen

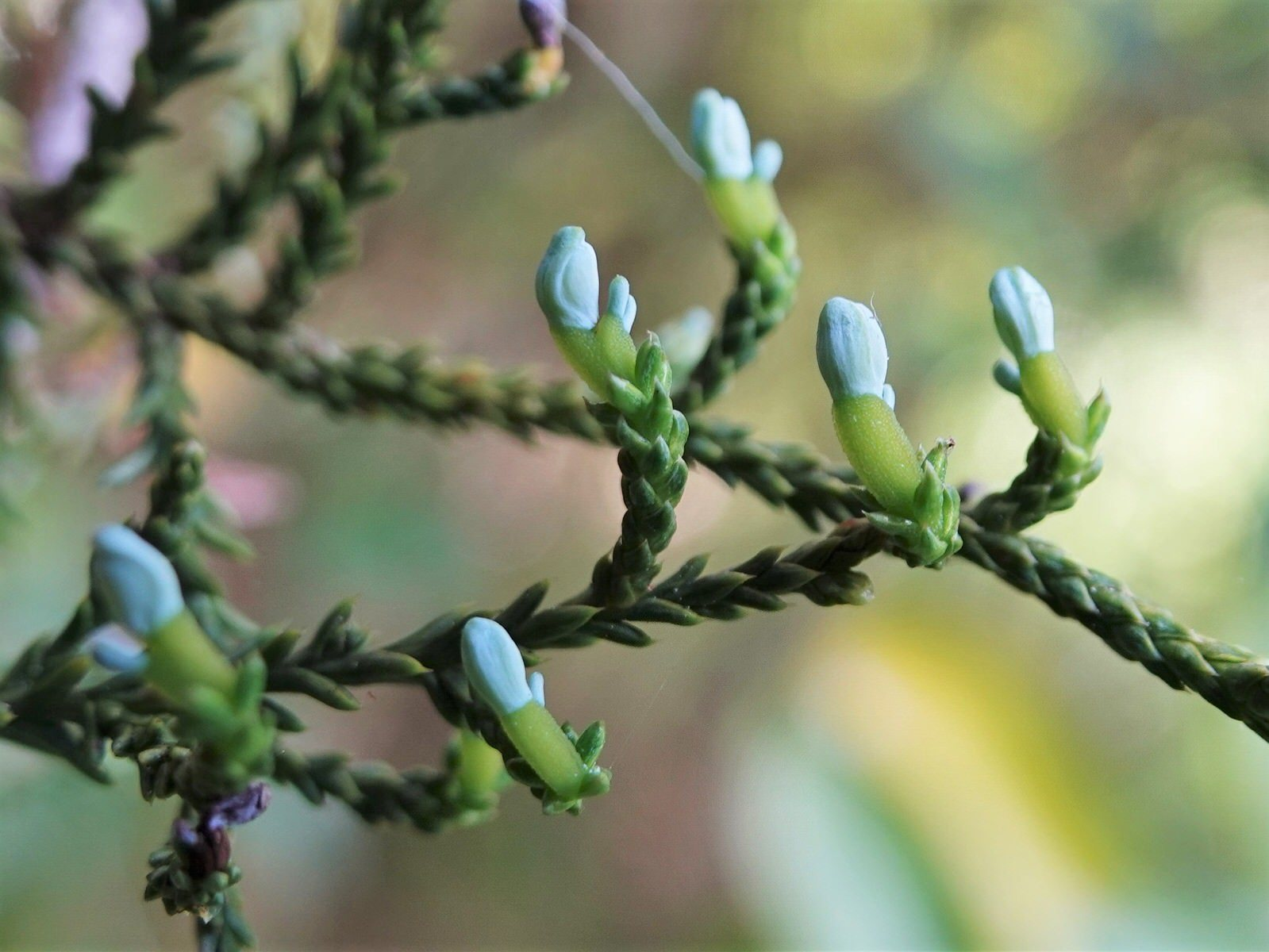
Female cones beginning to fruit

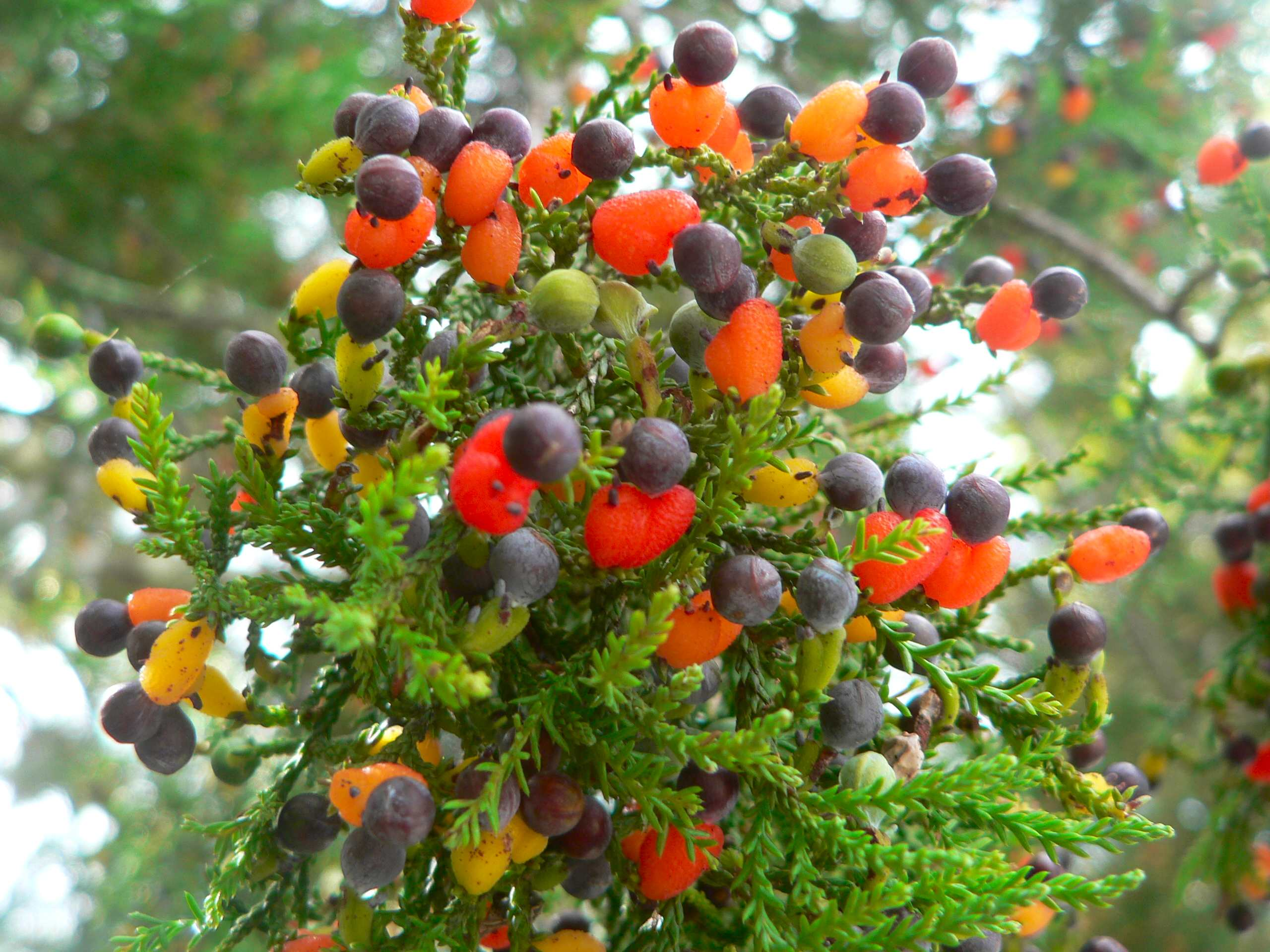
Ripe fruit

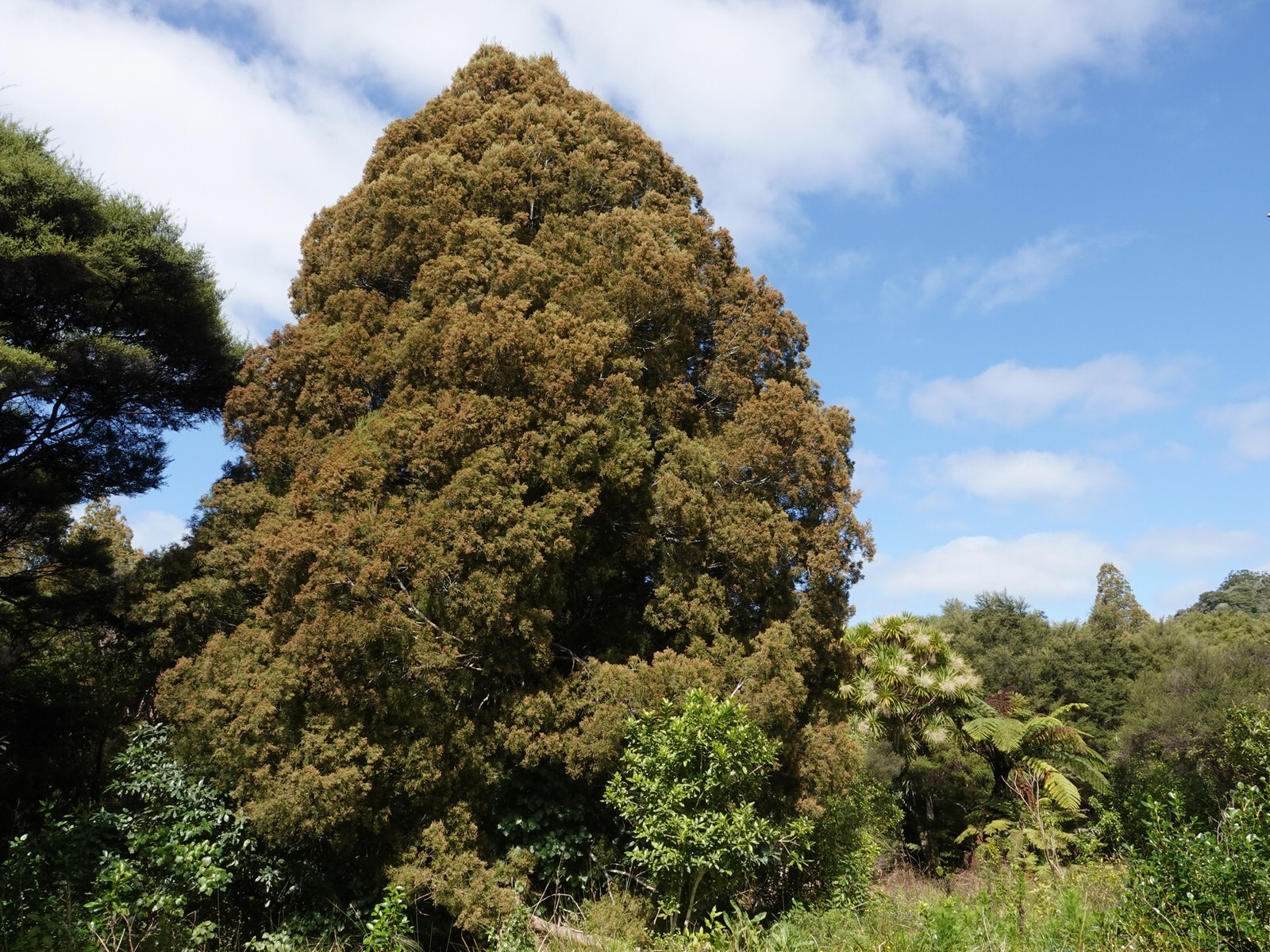
Young adult's conical growth habit

=== Phytochemistry ===
Several different glycosides have been isolated from the leaves; the tricetin 3',5'-di-O-/β-glucopyranoside and 3'-0-β-xylopyranoside have been found only in kahikatea. The receptacles and seeds have been found to contain anthocyanins, rare in gymnosperms, which it was suggested in one 1988 paper make the fruit as a whole more attractive to prospective animal dispersers.

== Taxonomy ==
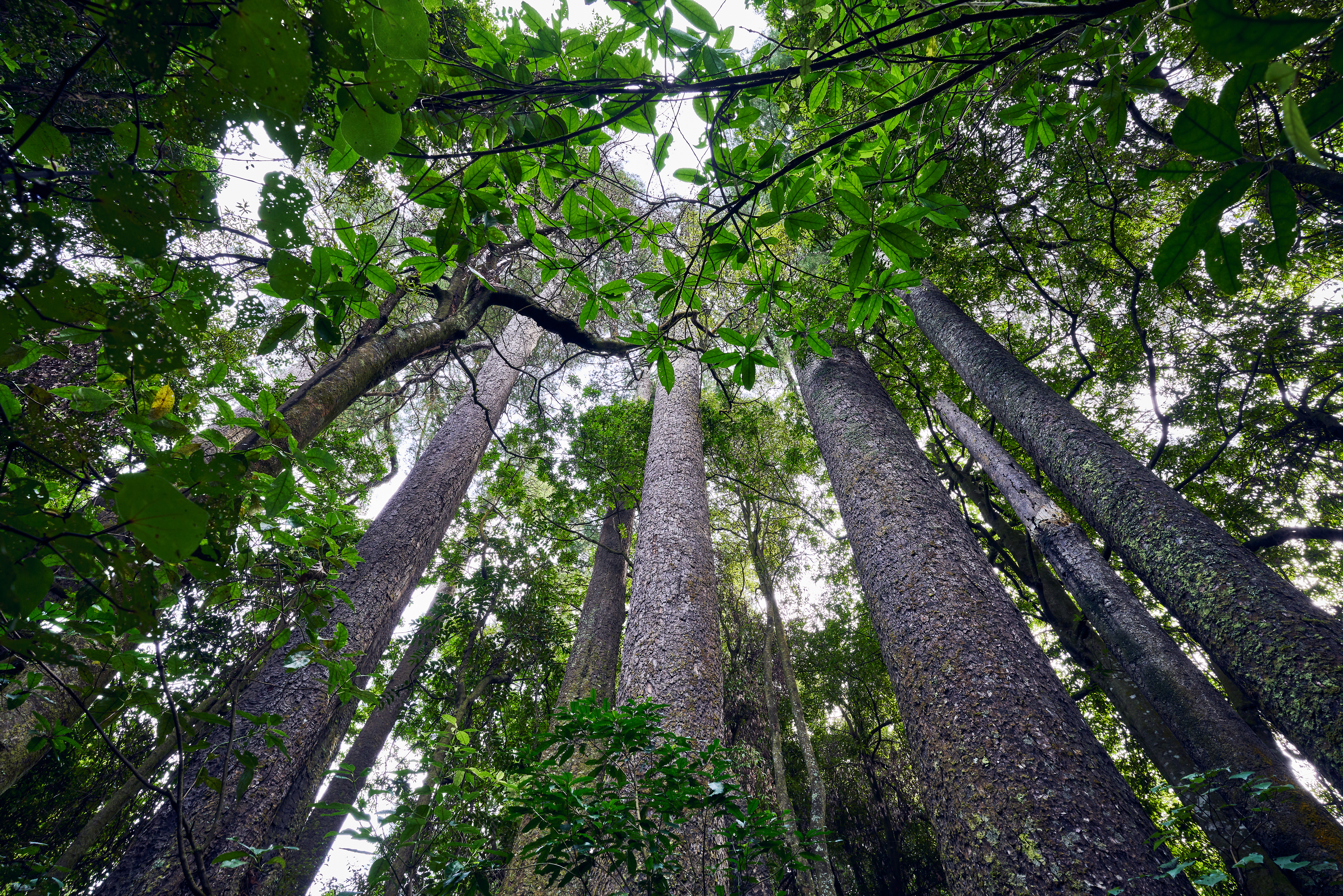
A stand of kahikatea in the Pohangina Valley.

The banks were completely clothed with the finest timber my eyes ever beheld, of a tree we had before seen, but only at a distance [...]. Thick woods of it were everywhere upon the banks, every tree as straight as a pine, and of immense size, and the higher we went the more numerous they were.

— Joseph Banks, possibly describing a former stand on the Waihou River, 1769

Kahikatea was first described in 1832 by the French botanist Achille Richard in his Essai d'une Flore de la Nouvelle Zélande (Essay on the Flora of New Zealand) as Podocarpus dacrydioides. There is an earlier record given in the 1825 issue of Mémoires du Muséum d'histoire naturelle as Podocarpus thujoides, but it lacks a description. It was superfluously named Dacrydium excelsum by Allan Cunningham in the 1838 issue of Annals of Natural History, and transferred to the genus Nageia by Otto Kuntze in 1891. It was given its current binomial name, Dacrycarpus dacrydioides, in 1969 by American botanist David de Laubenfels.

=== Etymology ===
The genus name Dacrycarpus derives from Greek, and means tear shaped fruit, and the specific epithet dacrydioides is after its similarity to species in the genus Dacrydium. Common names include kahikatea, from the Māori language, and white pine. Other Māori names recorded by 19th century ethnographers include: katea, kaikatea, koroī, kōaka, kahika, and the name kāī (for the young tree). The Māori name kahikatea means "white kahika", with kahika being descended from the Proto-Oceanic word *Kapika, primarily used in other Polynesian languages to describe Syzygium malaccense, or the malay apple. The name white pine was coined by James Cook.

=== Evolution ===
A 2022 study in Molecular Phylogenetics and Evolution, found a phylogeny, or evolutionary tree, in which kahikatea is found to be within a Darcydioid clade. This group of species that share a common ancestor also gave rise to the other Dacrycarpus species as well as those in the genus Dacrydium. They suggested it diverged from a common ancestor around 60 million years ago, in the early paleogene. This is represented in the cladogram below.

- - - Dacrycarpus dacrydioides — Kahikatea
    - - Dacrycarpus compactus
      - Dacrycarpus imbricatus
  - - Falcatifolium taxoides
    - - Dacrydium balansae
      - Dacrydium pectinatum

== Distribution and habitat ==
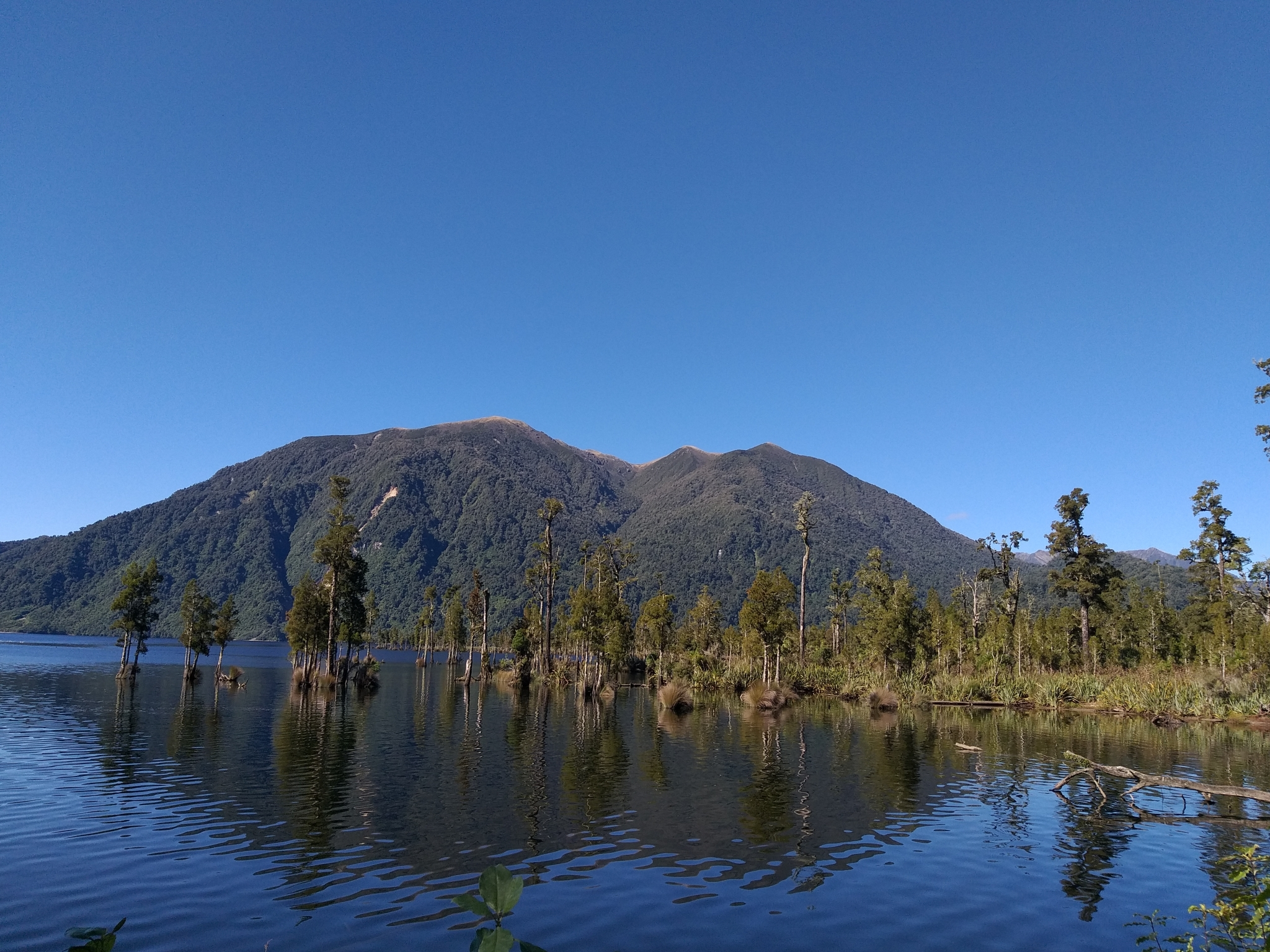
Kahikatea in Lake Brunner

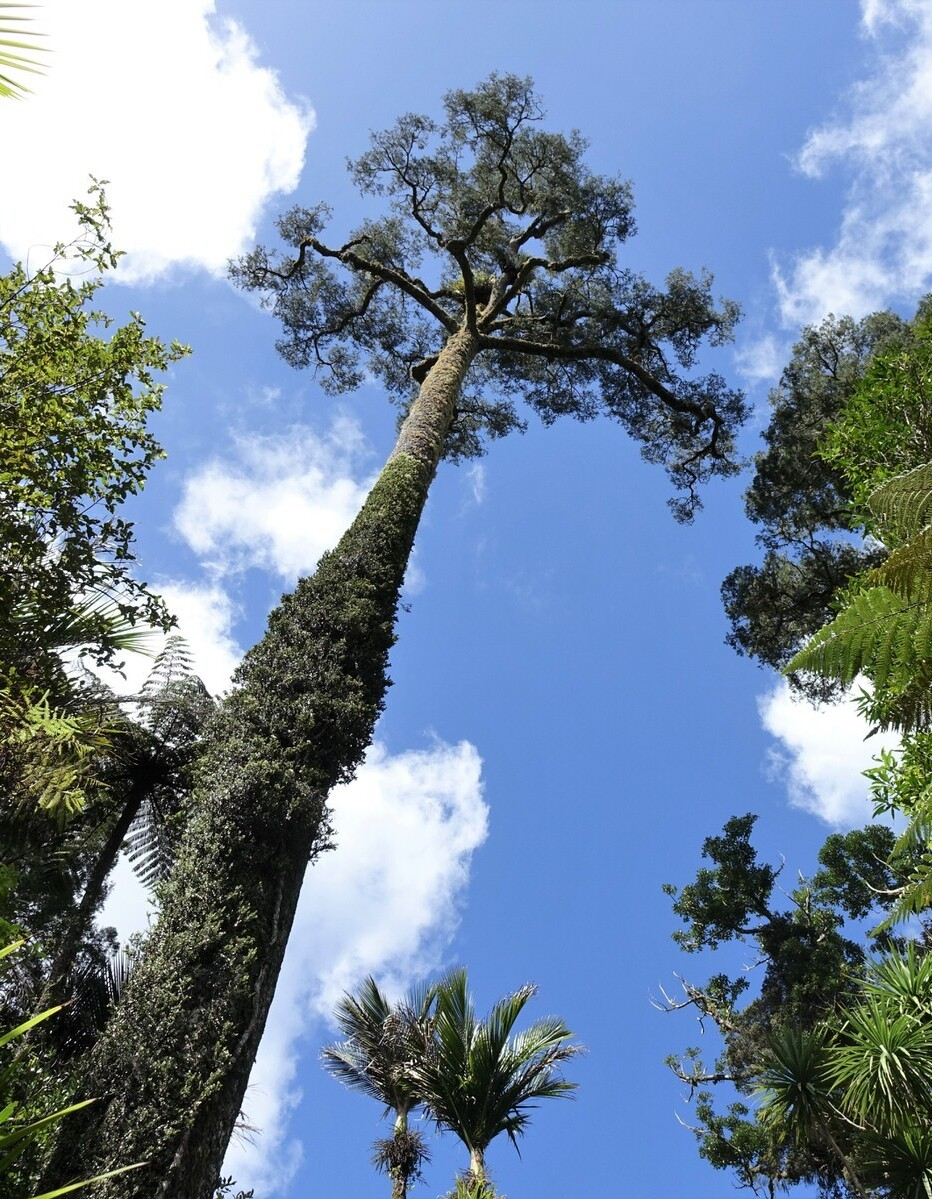
The kahikatea can support many other plants, such as those seen here up the trunk and in the higher branches.

Kahikatea is endemic to the North, South, and Stewart Islands of New Zealand, and is the only member of the genus Dacrycarpus found in the country. It inhabits mostly lowland forests between 0–600 m (0–1,969 ft) above sea level, though may in rare cases reach montane areas. It used to dominate a swamp forest type that now exists almost only on the South Westland region of the South Island. Kahikatea prefers flooded or alluvial soils with low levels of drainage, which in Westland occur from post glaciation events.

== Ecology ==
Under optimal circumstances a mature kahikatea can produce 800 kilograms (1,800 lb) of fruit, equivalent to 4.5 million seeds, in a year. The fruit contains a special fleshy structure called a receptacle which helps attract birds such as the kererū, tūī, and bellbird, who then eat the fruit and disperse the seed elsewhere. One 2008 study in the New Zealand Journal of Ecology found a mean retention time of kahikatea seeds in kererū of 44.5 minutes. It was suggested in a 1989 study that the high water content of the receptacle may also help protect the seeds, which are vulnerable to drying out, from dry conditions. It may also serve as a storage vessel for water. The bluish seeds have very strong UV reflectance, which is visible to some species of birds.

Kahikatea can support a vast number of non-parasitic plants that live in its branches, called epiphytes. One 2002 study identified between 90 and 100 species occurring on one mature tree. This included 49 vascular plants and over 50 non-vascular plants, which the authors identified as comparable to the number found on a Prumnopitys exigua in Bolivian cloud forest.

Intraspecific competition between kahikatea trees was found in a 1999 study to be an important factor in their survival and overall success, affecting both the rates of growth and of mortality. Older trees have a particularly large advantage over resources compared to newer ones, and also have higher growth rates. Following flooding or other natural events, kahikatea has been found to require an open canopy in order to re-establish. Because of the consistency of these events in South Westland however, many forested areas do not progress beyond regaining kahikatea and rimu, as other species, such as kāmahi, need the environment to improve before they can return. Kahikatea plays host to the New Zealand endemic beetle Agapanthida pulchella, and is the primary host of the lichen species Ramalina erumpens.

== In Māori culture ==
He toa piki rākau kahikatea, he kai na te pakiaka.

The champion kahikatea climber is food for the roots.

– Māori proverb or whakataukī about the dangers of gathering the fruit

In Māori mythology, kahikatea is a child of Tāne, the god of forests and birds, and Hine-wao-riki. It served as an important source of wood for the making of tools, of dye, and of food from its berries. Māori sometimes climbed more than 100 ft (30 m) to collect the berries.

The 19th-century British ethnographers William Colenso, Richard Taylor and Elsdon Best recorded the fruit of kahikatea (called koroī) being eaten. Best described climbers collecting berries in a basket, which they lowered on a cord, to be emptied, then hoisted and filled again. J. H. Kerry-Nicholls and Colenso both recorded a blue or black dye being obtained from the soot of burning kahikatea's resinous heartwood, called kāpara or māpara. The dye was then used in tattooing. The resin of kahikatea was used as chewing gum.

Waka (canoes) could be made from kahikatea, but Best recorded that they were far inferior to those made from tōtara, because kahikatea sapwood was not durable. The heartwood was far stronger and R. H. Matthews described it as being used in tools and weapons such as spears. Medicinal applications were described by W. H. Goldie, who recorded the leaves being used to cure "internal complaints" as a decoction or in a steam bath.

== Early European uses ==
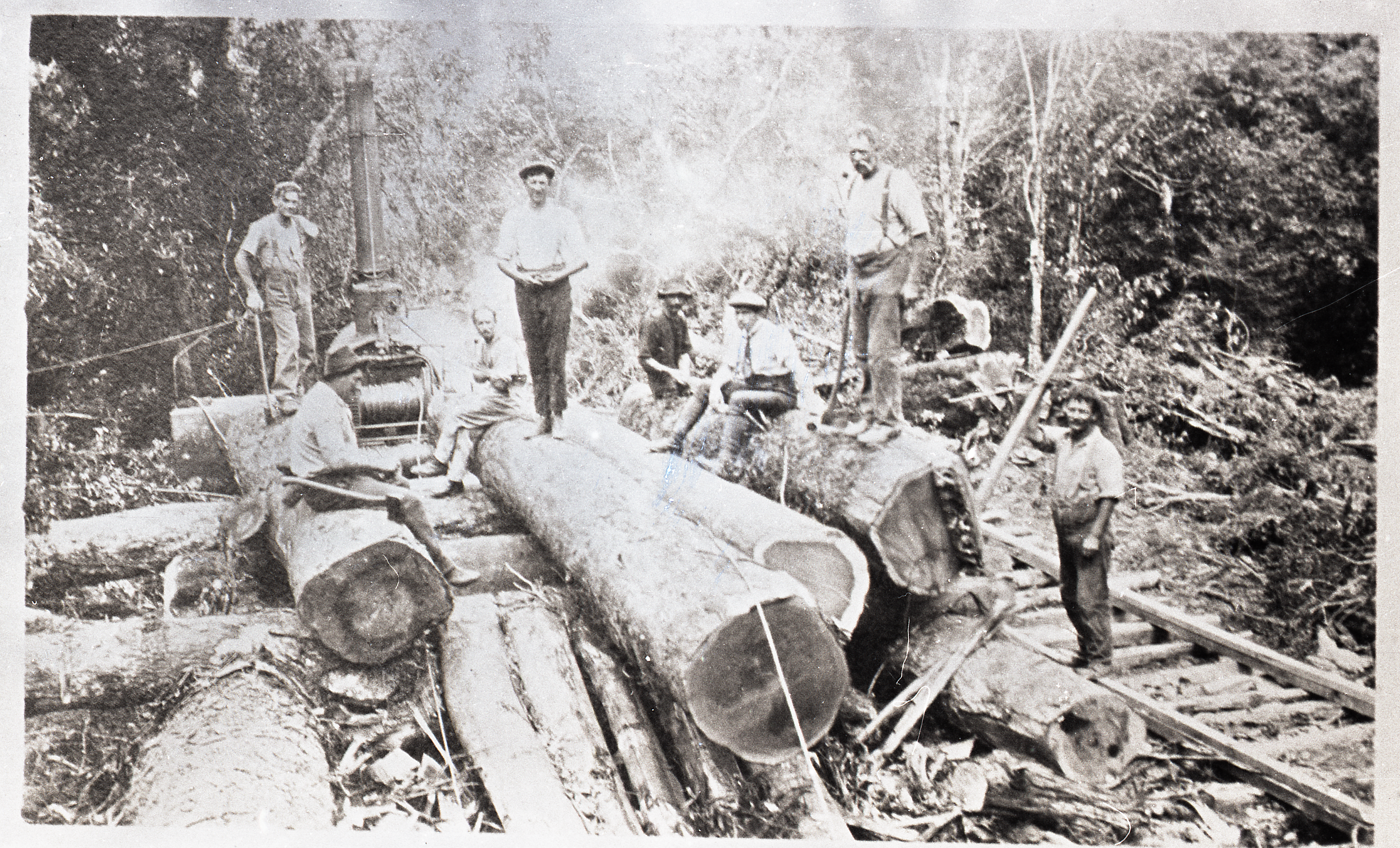
A milling gang, employed by Cook's timber mill, likely felling kahikatea

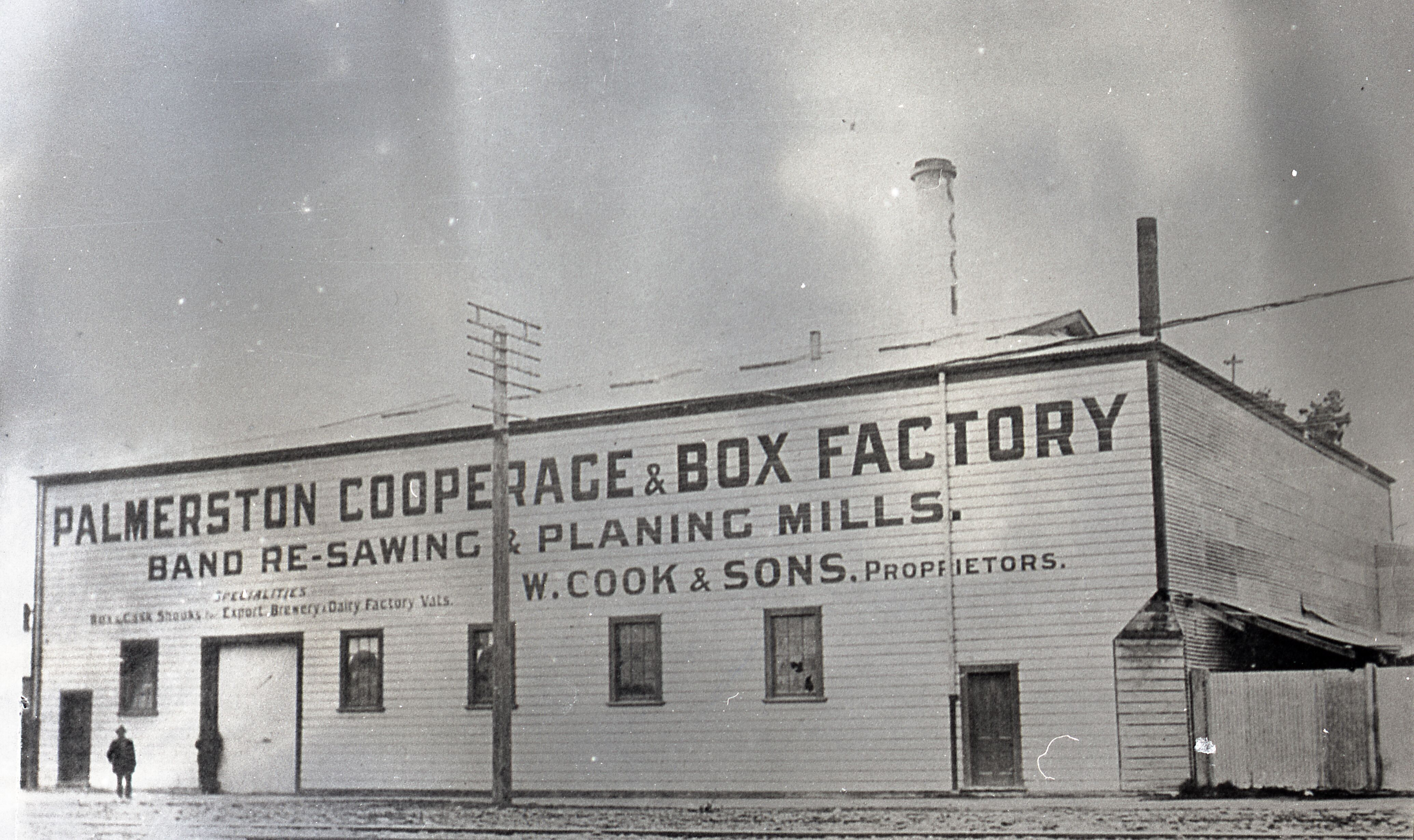
The Palmerston Cooperage and Box Factory was one of many factories used to produce boxes from kahikatea wood.

After visiting the Waihou River area in November 1769, Captain James Cook was impressed by the trees, believing that these would be a good source for masts and timber for ships. This led to an early shipbuilding industry in the late 18th and early 19th centuries, where European vessels would visit the Waihou River area to trade for kahikatea timber, despite the timber being easily water logged and not suitable for this purpose. By the 1820s, kauri spurs had begun to be used instead.

During the 19th century, kahikatea wood, due to being soft and odourless, was made into pulp, barrels and boxes, notably butter boxes for butter being exported to the United Kingdom, and occasionally to create furniture.

== Conservation ==
Prior to the arrival of humans in New Zealand around 75% of the country was covered in trees, and kahikatea dominated its own and once widespread kahikatea forest type. Even after the burning of many forests by early Māori, there still remained large remnant forests which European settlers came upon in the 18th and 19th centuries. In addition to the wood's use as timber, kahikatea's usually flat habitat, with its damp and fertile soil, was also a prime location for dairy farming. Together this led to the felling of much of the remaining forests in the North and South Islands during the late 19th and early 20th centuries. Today they are confined mostly to the South Westland region of the South Island, though small remnants still exist in some places.

Conservation efforts have focused on protecting and fencing kahikatea forests around the country. Riccarton Bush is one notable example of forest remnant protection. The near 16-acre (6.47 ha) reserve was held in the Deans family for 70 years before it was gifted to Christchurch by them in 1914, and subsequently formally protected in the Riccarton Bush Bill. It is the only surviving kahikatea forest remnant in the entire Canterbury Plains, and contains trees up to 600 years old. The Whangamarino Wetland, a swamp-fen-bog complex south of Auckland on the North Island, was identified as an area of priority restoration as an ecosystem; the wetland is connected to the Waikato Tainui iwi. Reservation of stands may not totally protect kahikatea, however, because the alluvial plains that they favour are prone to upheaval and erosion and so trees may still become damaged. Forest remnants outside of South Westland face the threat of never returning to their natural states, as a result of their small size, threats from weed species, and grazing by livestock. Despite this, kahikatea has been classified as least concern by the International Union for Conservation of Nature and "Not Threatened" by the New Zealand Threat Classification System, which gives it an estimated population of above 100,000.

=== Threats ===
The introduced grey willow and crack willow have thrived in the deforested areas where kahikatea was previously dominant. The willows are fast-growing and have obstructed streams, displaced native vegetation, and contributed to a loss in native biodiversity. Kahikatea are considered a light-demanding species that struggles to progress beyond the sapling stage in areas with high willow density. Although the herbicide glyphosate has been successful in thinning mature grey willow canopies and providing a window for reestablishing native sedges, treated willows can rapidly reestablish their populations in an area due to epicormic shoots. Exclusive use of glyphosate to control willow populations would require periodic herbicide application into perpetuity.

The trees are also threatened by diminished seed availability and distribution due to a reduction in native bird species that dispersed the seeds, such as the kererū. Although some non-native birds, such as the common blackbird, are also prolific seed-spreaders, survival of the kahikatea seeds are further threatened by introduced mice and rats.
