= Dacrycarpus steupii =

Conservation status
- Near Threatened (IUCN 3.1)

Scientific classification
- Kingdom: Plantae
- Clade: Tracheophytes
- Clade: Gymnospermae
- Division: Pinophyta
- Class: Pinopsida
- Order: Araucariales
- Family: Podocarpaceae
- Genus: Dacrycarpus
- Species: D. steupii

Binomial name
- Dacrycarpus steupii (Wasscher) de Laub.

Synonyms
- Bracteocarpus steupii (Wasscher) A.V.Bobrov & Melikyan; Podocarpus steupii Wasscher

Species of conifer

Dacrycarpus steupii is a species of conifer in the family Podocarpaceae. It is a tree native to Borneo, the Philippines, Sulawesi, and New Guinea.

The species was first described as Podocarpus steupii by Jacob Wasscher in 1941. In 1969 David John de Laubenfels placed the species in genus Dacrycarpus as D. steupii.

== Characteristics ==
Dacrycarpus steupii can grow to an average height of about 35 m, but it is common to see them stunted in growth. The outer bark is black to dark brown while the inner bark is reddish brown to pink. The bark also peels off in small flakes. The male flowers cannot be seen. Female cones can be found on long, elongate leaves. The needles on the branches are widespread.

== Range and habitat ==
Dacrycarpus steupii is native to Borneo, the Philippines, Sulawesi, and New Guinea. On Borneo D. steupii was known only from a population near Balikpapan in Kalimantan that is now extinct, and it is believed to be extinct on the island. It is known from the Latimodjong Mountains on Sulawesi and Luzon in the Philippines, and is thought to be widespread on New Guinea.

It grows in montane rain forest and subalpine shrubland from 860 to 3,470 metres elevation. In montane forests and protected gullies in upper montane forests it can be a tall emergent tree. It grows lower in high-elevation mossy forests, and in subalpine zones it grows as a dwarf tree or shrub at the edges of wet tussock grasslands on peaty soils, often in single-species clumps, or in New Guinea mixed with Papuacedrus papuana.

== Population ==
It is threatened by habitat loss and modern agricultural growth.
