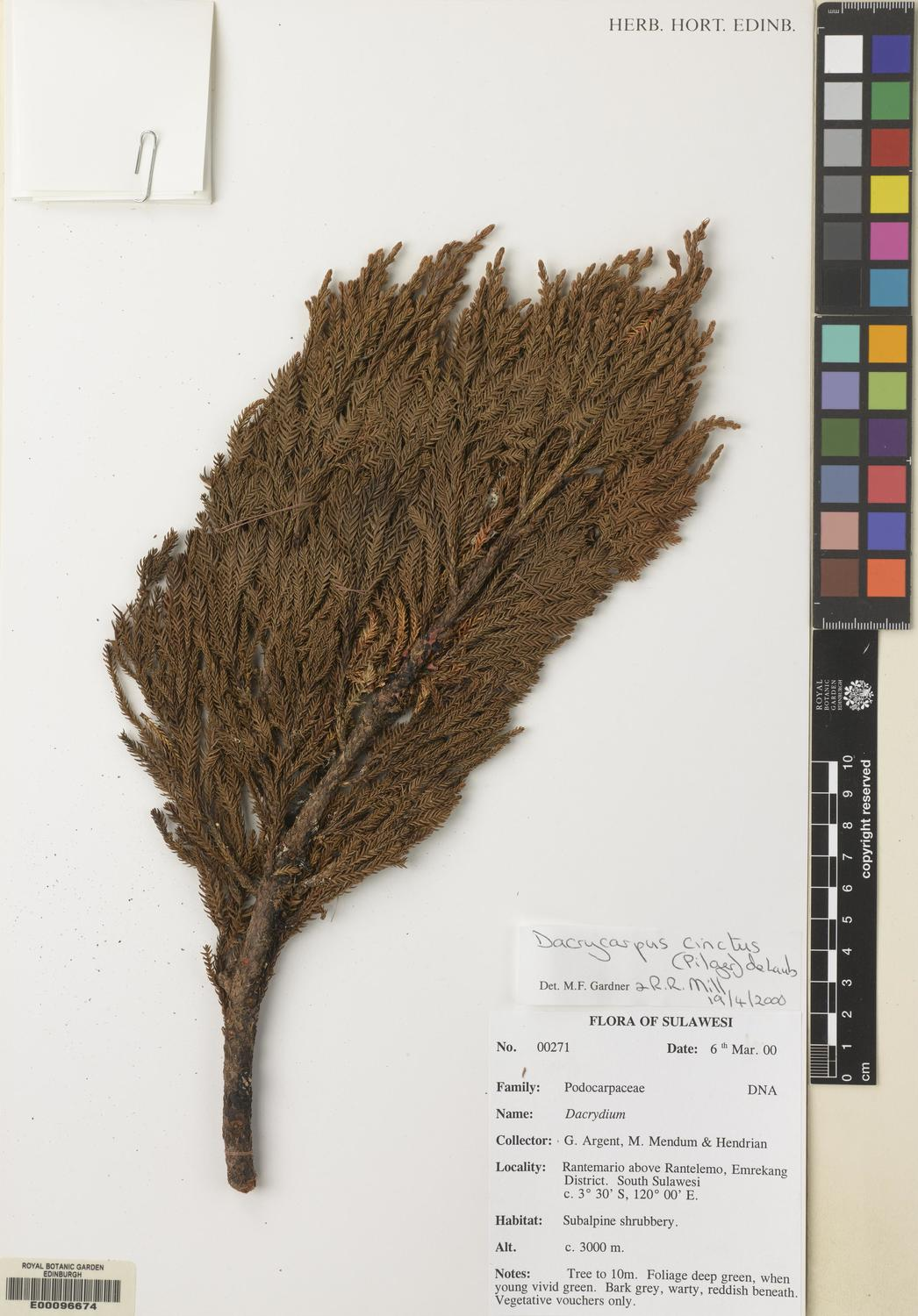
- Specimen at Royal Botanic Garden Edinburgh

Conservation status
- Least Concern (IUCN 3.1)

Scientific classification
- Kingdom: Plantae
- Clade: Tracheophytes
- Clade: Gymnospermae
- Division: Pinophyta
- Class: Pinopsida
- Order: Araucariales
- Family: Podocarpaceae
- Genus: Dacrycarpus
- Species: D. cinctus

Binomial name
- Dacrycarpus cinctus (Pilg.) de Laub.

Synonyms
- Bracteocarpus cinctus (Pilg.) A.V.Bobrov & Melikyan; Bracteocarpus dacrydiifolius (Wasscher) A.V.Bobrov & Melikyan; Podocarpus cinctus Pilg. (1938) (basionym); Dacrycarpus dacrydiifolius (Wasscher) Gaussen; Podocarpus dacrydiifolius Wasscher

= Dacrycarpus cinctus =

Species of conifer

Dacrycarpus cinctus is a species of conifer in the family Podocarpaceae. It is a tree native to Borneo (Sarawak), Sulawesi, the Maluku Islands, and New Guinea.

It is native to montane rainforest. In New Guinea it grows in montane rain forest above 1800 metres elevation, where it a tall and often emergent tree, dominant or codominant with broadleaf species of Nothofagus and Elaeocarpus, and with the conifers Papuacedrus papuana and Podocarpus spp. Above 3000 metres elevation it forms solitary clumps in upper montane forest where broadleaf Cunoniaceae and Myrtaceae species are abundant. Dacrycarpus extends to the tree line as krummholz trees or solitary shrubs. On Sulawesi it is found in lower montane rain forest above 900 meters elevation.

The species was first described as Podocarpus cinctus by Robert Knud Friedrich Pilger in 1938. In 1969 David John de Laubenfels placed it in the genus Dacrycarpus as D. cinctus.
