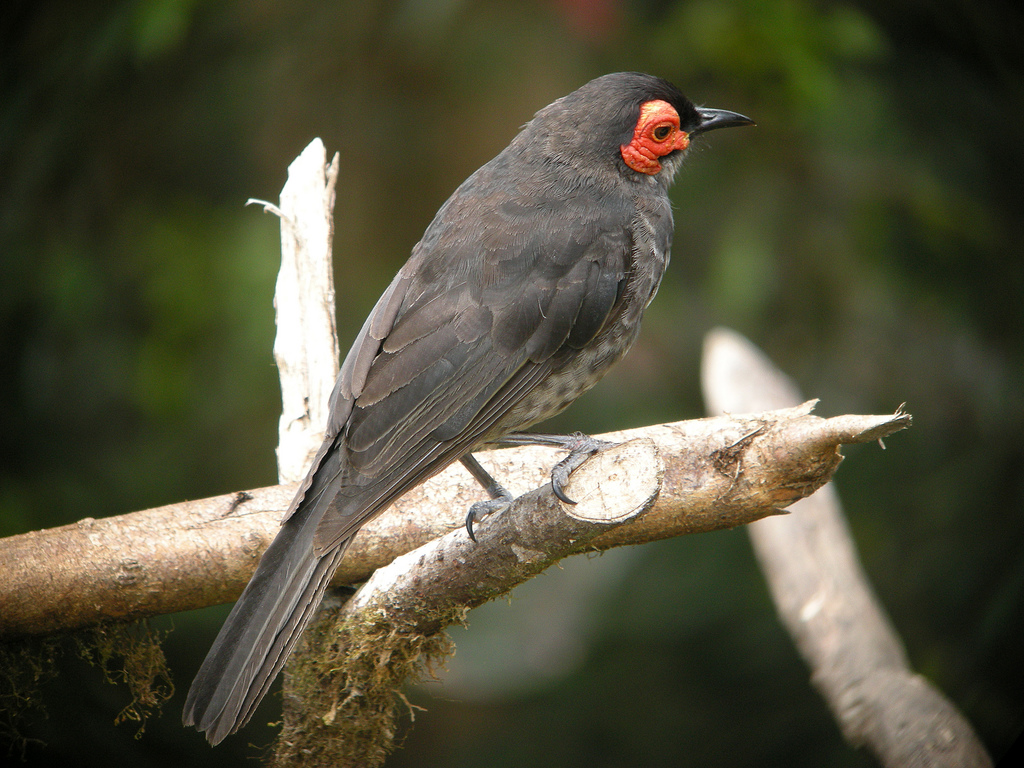
- Common smoky honeyeater (Melipotes fumigatus)

Scientific classification
- Kingdom: Animalia
- Phylum: Chordata
- Class: Aves
- Order: Passeriformes
- Family: Meliphagidae
- Genus: Melipotes; P.L. Sclater, 1874

Type species
- Melipotes gymnops Sclater, 1874

= Melipotes =

Genus of birds

Melipotes is a genus of bird in the family Meliphagidae. They have an overall dark plumage and extensive yellow, orange or reddish facial skin. The four allopatric species are restricted to the highland forest of New Guinea. The sister of this genus is Macgregoria; a genus where the single species until recently was regarded as a bird-of-paradise.

== Species ==
Melipotes contains the following species:

Image	Scientific name	Common name	Distribution
	Melipotes ater	Spangled honeyeater	Papua New Guinea
	Melipotes fumigatus	Common smoky honeyeater	New Guinea
	Melipotes gymnops	Arfak honeyeater	West Papua, Indonesia
	Melipotes carolae	Wattled smoky honeyeater	New Guinea
