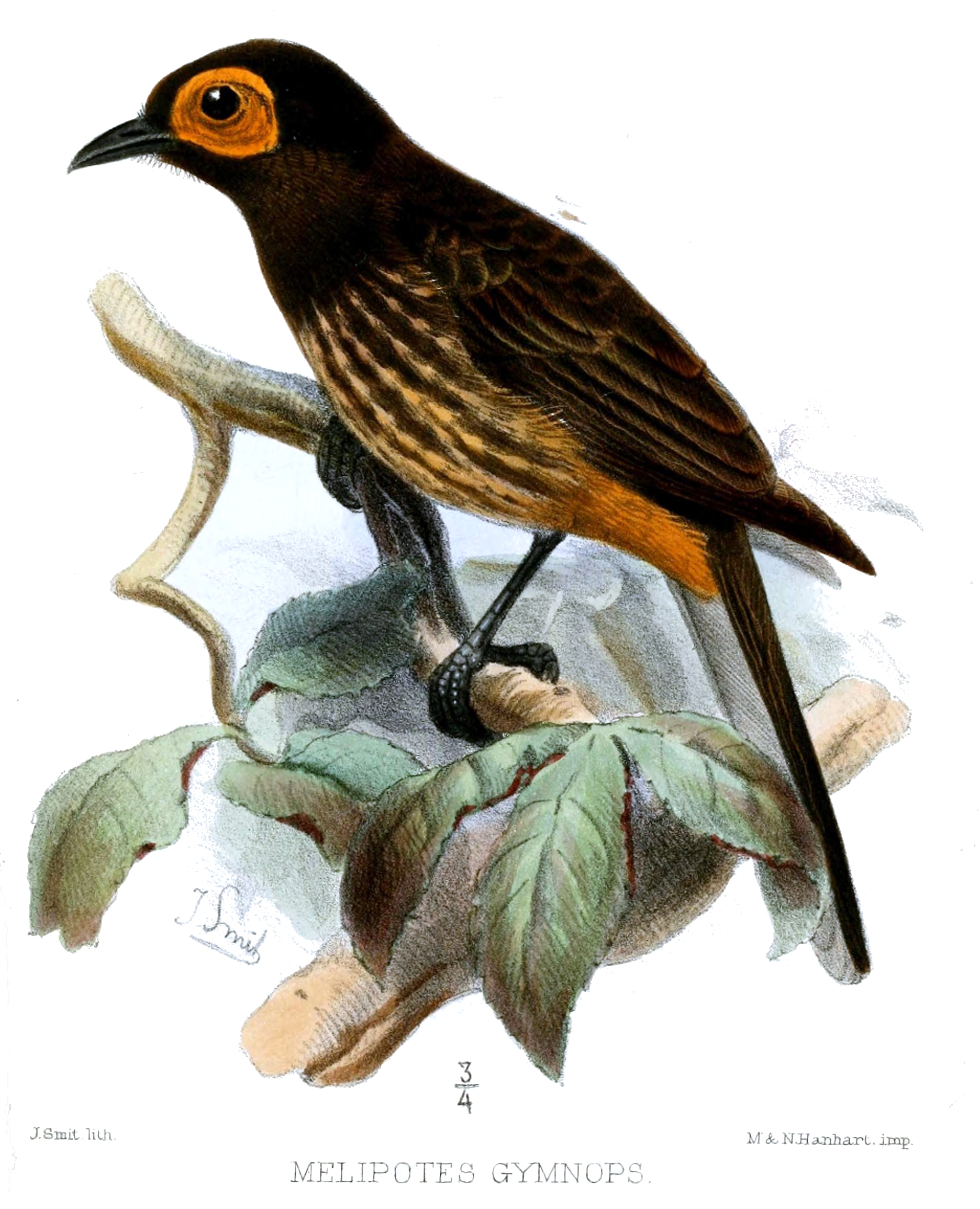

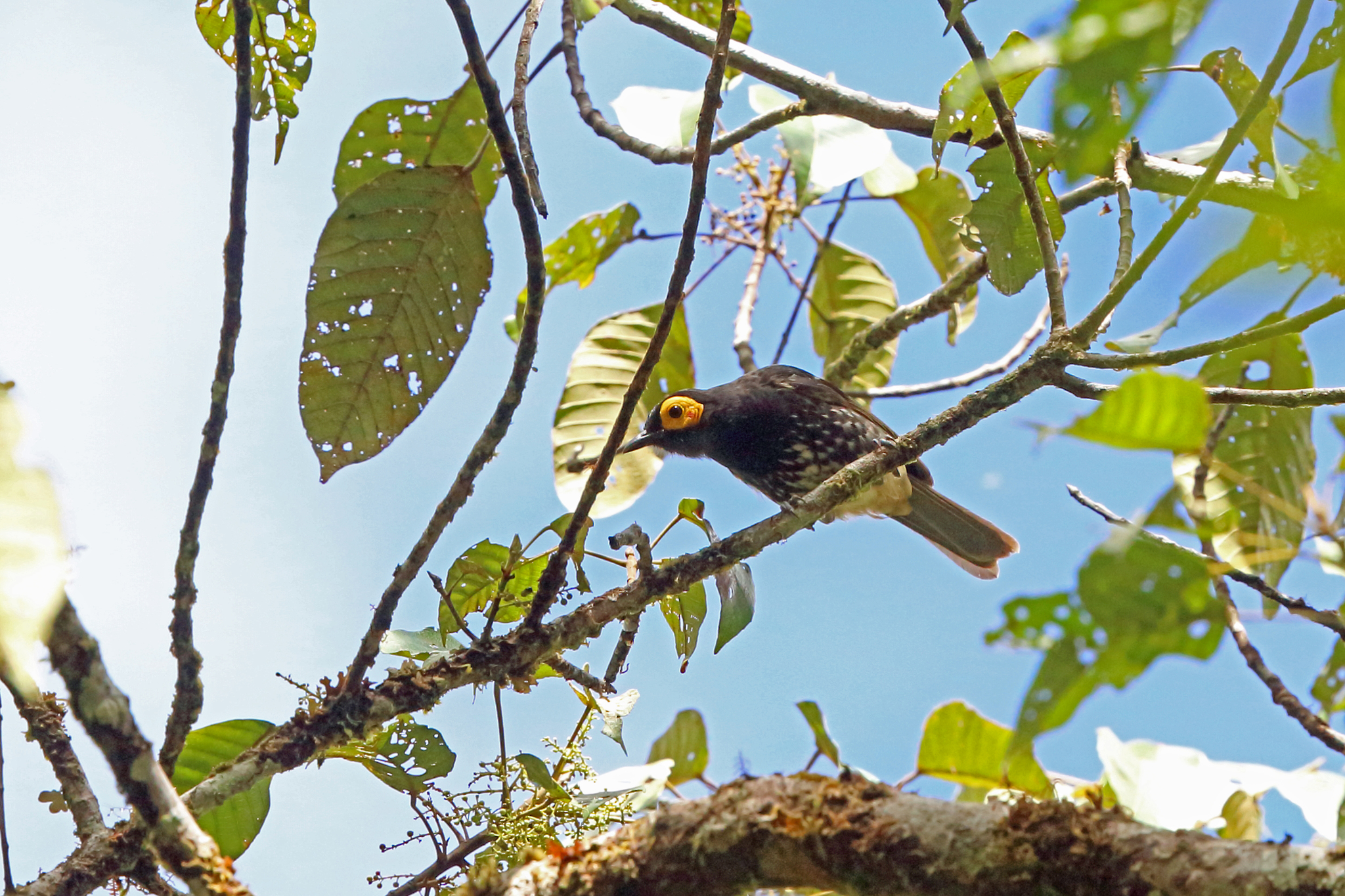

Conservation status
- Least Concern (IUCN 3.1)

Scientific classification
- Kingdom: Animalia
- Phylum: Chordata
- Class: Aves
- Order: Passeriformes
- Family: Meliphagidae
- Genus: Melipotes
- Species: M. gymnops

Binomial name
- Melipotes gymnops Sclater, PL, 1874

= Arfak honeyeater =

Species of bird

The Arfak honeyeater (Melipotes gymnops) or bare-eyed honeyeater, is a species of bird in the family Meliphagidae. It is endemic to West Papua, Indonesia, where it lives in subtropical and tropical moist montane forest, at elevations ranging from 1,200 to 2,700 m (3,900 to 8,900 ft).
