= Smoky honeyeater =

There are two species of bird named smoky honeyeater.

- Common smoky honeyeater, Melipotes fumigatus
- Wattled smoky honeyeater, Melipotes carolae
