= Dacrycarpus compactus =

Conservation status
- Least Concern (IUCN 3.1)

Scientific classification
- Kingdom: Plantae
- Clade: Tracheophytes
- Clade: Gymnospermae
- Division: Pinophyta
- Class: Pinopsida
- Order: Araucariales
- Family: Podocarpaceae
- Genus: Dacrycarpus
- Species: D. compactus

Binomial name
- Dacrycarpus compactus (Wasscher) de Laub.

Synonyms
- Bracteocarpus compactus (Wasscher) A.V.Bobrov & Melikyan; Podocarpus compactus Wasscher

Species of conifer

Dacrycarpus compactus is a species of conifer in the family Podocarpaceae. It is a tree endemic to New Guinea.

Dacrycarpus compactus is native to New Guinea's Central Range in both Papua New Guinea and Indonesia, where it grows in upper montane rain forest and subalpine grassland and shrubland from 2800 to 4300 metres elevation. There is an apparent gap in its distribution in the Western Highlands of Papua New Guinea from 141º E to 144º E, where Dacrycarpus expansus is present.

In upper montane forests above 2800 metres elevation it grows with Papuacedrus papuana, Podocarpus spp., and some broadleaf trees in families Myrtaceae and Cunoniaceae. It becomes more abundant and often dominant in higher elevation mossy low forest below the tree line, and at the fringes of peaty tussock wet grasslands where it grows with Papuacedrus papuana. It is present as scattered shrubs in subalpine grasslands up to 4300 metres elevation.

The species was first described as Podocarpus compactus by Jacob Wasscher in 1941. In 1969 David John de Laubenfels placed the species in genus Dacrycarpus as D. compactus.
