= Dacrycarpus cumingii =

Conservation status
- Least Concern (IUCN 3.1)

Scientific classification
- Kingdom: Plantae
- Clade: Tracheophytes
- Clade: Gymnosperms
- Division: Pinophyta
- Class: Pinopsida
- Order: Araucariales
- Family: Podocarpaceae
- Genus: Dacrycarpus
- Species: D. cumingii

Binomial name
- Dacrycarpus cumingii (Parl.) de Laub.

Synonyms
- Bracteocarpus cumingii (Parl.) A.V.Bobrov & Melikyan; Nageia cumingii (Parl.) Kuntze; Podocarpus cumingii Parl.; Podocarpus imbricatus var. cumingii (Parl.) Pilg.

Species of conifer

Dacrycarpus cumingii is a species of conifer in the family Podocarpaceae. It is a tree native to Sumatra, Borneo, and the Philippines.

D. cumingii is a coniferous tree that can grow to be 8-25 metres tall. The bole can be 18-75cm in diameter. The tree is harvested from the wild for its wood, which is traded, mainly locally.

D. cumingii is most widespread in the Philippines, where it grows on most of the major islands including Palawan. There are smaller outlier populations on Borneo (Sarawak) and Sumatra. It grows in high-elevation mossy forest up to the tree line at 3,300 metres elevation, where the climate is cool and wet and frequently fog-shrouded. It is less common in upper montane forest down to 1,600 metres elevation, where it is associated with the trees Agathis spp. and Sundacarpus amarus.

Logging and deforestation are very likely to have reduced the area of occupancy and abundance of this species where it occurred at lower elevations, though data are unavailable to estimate the extent of this decline. Mostly, it occurs at elevations and in forest types which have been less affected, therefore the decline probably does not exceed 20% over the past three generations.

The plant is classified as 'Least Concern' in the IUCN Red List of Threatened Species (2013), though distribution data has still not been mapped for the species.

The species was first described as Podocarpus cumingii by Filippo Parlatore in 1868. In 1969 David John de Laubenfels placed the species in genus Dacrycarpus as D. cumingii.
