= Spangled honeyeater =

Conservation status
- Least Concern (IUCN 3.1)

Scientific classification
- Kingdom: Animalia
- Phylum: Chordata
- Class: Aves
- Order: Passeriformes
- Family: Meliphagidae
- Genus: Melipotes
- Species: M. ater

Binomial name
- Melipotes ater Rothschild & Hartert, 1911

Species of bird

The spangled honeyeater (Melipotes ater) is a species of bird in the family Meliphagidae. It is endemic to the Huon Peninsula (Papua New Guinea).

Its natural habitat is subtropical or tropical moist montane forests.
