= Dacrycarpus kinabaluensis =

Conservation status
- Least Concern (IUCN 3.1)

Scientific classification
- Kingdom: Plantae
- Clade: Tracheophytes
- Clade: Gymnospermae
- Division: Pinophyta
- Class: Pinopsida
- Order: Araucariales
- Family: Podocarpaceae
- Genus: Dacrycarpus
- Species: D. kinabaluensis

Binomial name
- Dacrycarpus kinabaluensis (Wasscher) de Laub.

Synonyms
- Bracteocarpus kinabaluensis (Wasscher) A.V.Bobrov & Melikyan; Podocarpus imbricatus var. kinabaluensis Wasscher

Species of conifer

Dacrycarpus kinabaluensis is a species of shrubby conifer in the family Podocarpaceae. It is a shrubby tree found only on Mount Kinabalu in Sabah, Malaysian Borneo.

It grows in upper montane forest and subalpine dwarf forest, from c. 2,600 metres elevation to the tree line at about 3,500 metres. It grows on ultramafic rock, and on granite above 3000 metres elevation. It can form dense, nearly pure stands or grows in association with other conifers including Dacrydium gracile, D. gibbsiae, Phyllocladus hypophyllus, and Podocarpus brevifolius. Other associated species include the shrubs Rhododendron spp. and Leptospermum spp., with orchids and pitcher plants (Nepenthes spp.) on the forest floor and epiphytes growing on shrubs and trees.

The species was first described as Podocarpus imbricatus var. kinabaluensis by Jacob Wasscher in 1941. In 1969 David John de Laubenfels recognised it as a full species, and placed in genus Dacrycarpus as D. kinabaluensis.
