= Dacrycarpus expansus =

Conservation status
- Least Concern (IUCN 3.1)

Scientific classification
- Kingdom: Plantae
- Clade: Tracheophytes
- Clade: Gymnospermae
- Division: Pinophyta
- Class: Pinopsida
- Order: Araucariales
- Family: Podocarpaceae
- Genus: Dacrycarpus
- Species: D. expansus

Binomial name
- Dacrycarpus expansus de Laub.

Synonyms
- Bracteocarpus expansus (de Laub.) A.V.Bobrov & Melikyan; Podocarpus expansus (de Laub.) Whitmore

Species of conifer

Dacrycarpus expansus is a species of conifer in the family Podocarpaceae. It is a tree endemic to New Guinea, where it is native to the Central Highlands of western Papua New Guinea, with a western outlier population in Western New Guinea (Indonesia), and an eastern outlier in the Owen Stanley Range on the Papuan Peninsula. It grows in upper montane forest and high montane forest from 2000 to 3,500 metres elevation, often at the margins of tussock grasslands and often in waterlogged, peaty, and acidic soils. It can grow in nearly pure stands or mixed with Papuacedrus papuana and tree ferns (Cyathea spp.).

The species was first described by David John de Laubenfels in 1969.
