= Dacrycarpus vieillardii =

Conservation status
- Least Concern (IUCN 3.1)

Scientific classification
- Kingdom: Plantae
- Clade: Tracheophytes
- Clade: Gymnospermae
- Division: Pinophyta
- Class: Pinopsida
- Order: Araucariales
- Family: Podocarpaceae
- Genus: Dacrycarpus
- Species: D. vieillardii

Binomial name
- Dacrycarpus vieillardii (Parl.) de Laub.

Synonyms
- Dacrydium elatum var. compactum Carrière; Dacrydium elatum var. tenuifolium Carrière; Laubenfelsia vieillardii (Parl.) A.V.Bobrov & Melikyan; Nageia tenuifolia (Carrière) Kuntze; Nageia vieillardii (Parl.) Kuntze; Podocarpus vieillardii Parl.; Podocarpus taxodioides var. tenuifolius Carrière; Podocarpus tenuifolius (Carrière) Parl.

Species of plant

Dacrycarpus vieillardii is a species of conifer in the family Podocarpaceae. It is a tree endemic to New Caledonia. It is native to central and southern Grande Terre, New Caledonia's main island, where it grows in lowland rain forest on ultramafic soils, particularly along river banks and in humid depressions, from 50 to 900 metres elevation. It is relatively common and has a stable population.

The species was first described as Podocarpus viellardii by Filippo Parlatore in 1868. In 1969 David John de Laubenfels placed the species in genus Dacrycarpus as D. viellardii.
