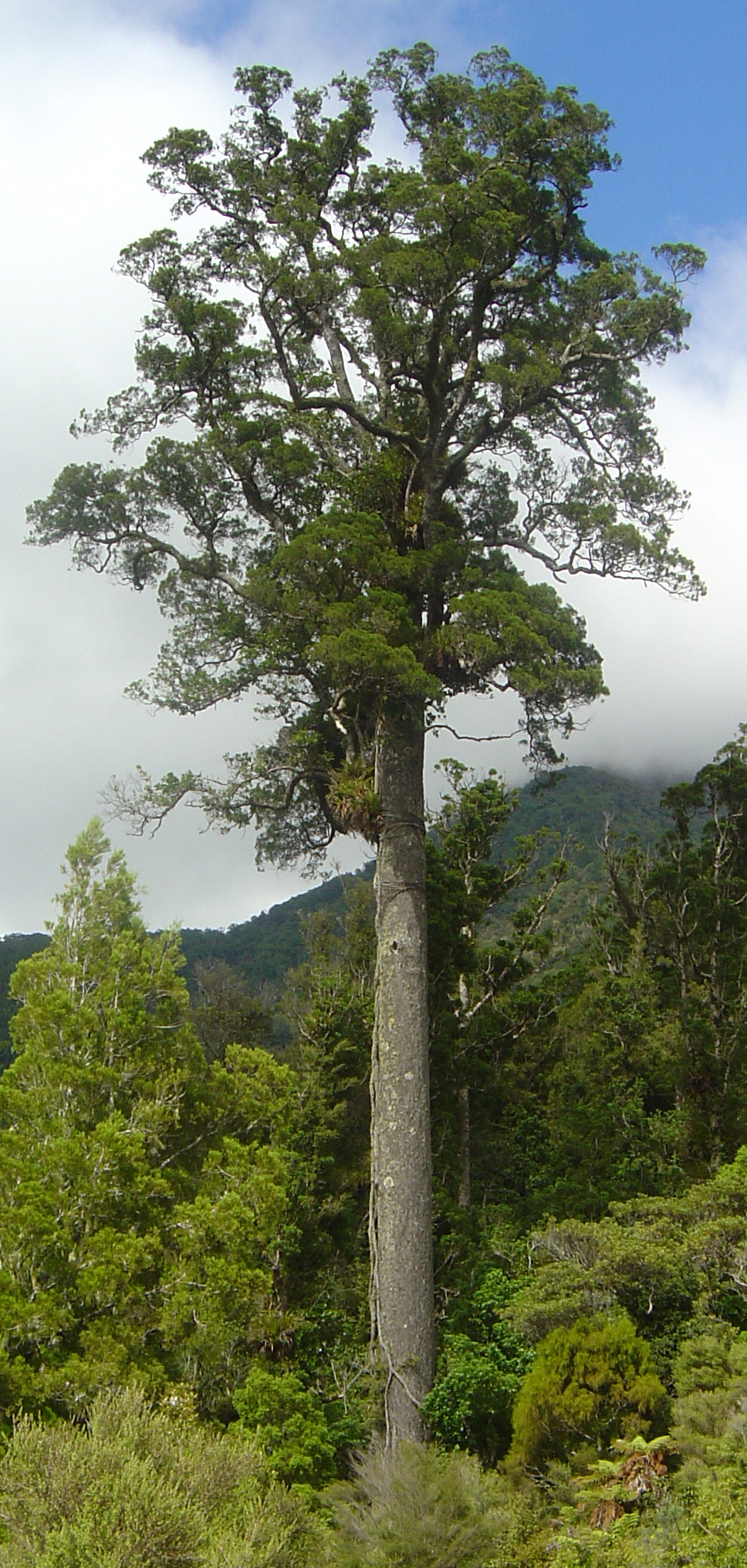
- Dacrycarpus dacrydioides

Scientific classification
- Kingdom: Plantae
- Clade: Tracheophytes
- Clade: Gymnosperms
- Division: Pinophyta
- Class: Pinopsida
- Order: Araucariales
- Family: Podocarpaceae
- Genus: Dacrycarpus (Endlicher) de Laubenfels

Type species
- Dacrycarpus dacrydioides (A. Richard) de Laubenfels

Species
- †D. carpenterii; D. cinctus (Pilg.) de Laub.; D. compactus (Wasscher) de Laub.; D. cumingii (Parl.) de Laub.; D. dacrydioides (A.Rich.) de Laub.; D. expansus de Laub.; D. imbricatus (Blume) de Laub.; D. kinabaluensis (Wasscher) de Laub.; D. steupii (Wasscher) de Laub.; D. vieillardii (Parl.) de Laub.

Synonyms
- Bracteocarpus Bobrov & Melikian; Laubenfelsia Bobrov & Melikian

= Dacrycarpus =

Genus of conifers

Dacrycarpus is a genus of conifers in the family Podocarpaceae. The genus includes nine species of dioecious trees and shrubs to 55–60 metres (180–197 ft) in height.

== Species ==
The species of Dacrycarpus range from New Zealand and Fiji, across New Caledonia, New Guinea, Indonesia, Malaysia and the Philippines to northern Myanmar and southern China. The greatest diversity (five species) exists in New Guinea.

Phylogeny of Dacrycarpus

- - D. vieillardii (Parlatore) de Laubenfels
  - - D. dacrydioides (Richard) de Laubenfels
    - - D. cumingii (Parlatore) de Laubenfels
      - - D. imbricatus (Blume) de Laubenfels
        - - D. compactus (Wasscher) de Laubenfels
          - - D. expansus de Laubenfels
            - - D. cinctus (Pilger) de Laubenfels
              - D. kinabaluensis (Wasscher) de Laubenfels

Image	Scientific name	Distribution
	Dacrycarpus cinctus	Borneo, Sulawesi, Maluku, and New Guinea
	Dacrycarpus compactus	New Guinea
	Dacrycarpus cumingii	Borneo, Sumatra, and the Philippines
	Dacrycarpus dacrydioides	New Zealand
	Dacrycarpus expansus	New Guinea (Papua New Guinea)
	Dacrycarpus imbricatus	Cambodia, southern China, Fiji, Indonesia, Laos, Malaysia, Papua New Guinea, the Philippines, Thailand, Vanuatu, and Vietnam
	Dacrycarpus kinabaluensis	Mount Kinabalu in Sabah, Malaysian Borneo
	Dacrycarpus steupii	Borneo, Sulawesi, the Philippines, and New Guinea
	Dacrycarpus vieillardii	New Caledonia
