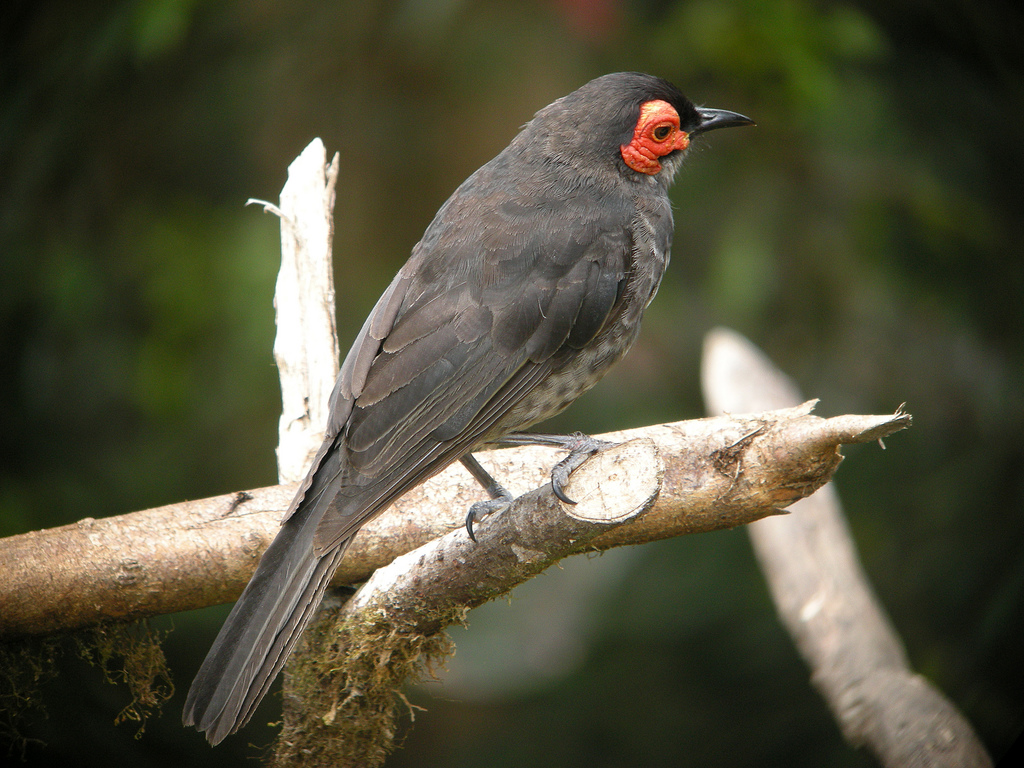

Conservation status
- Least Concern (IUCN 3.1)

Scientific classification
- Kingdom: Animalia
- Phylum: Chordata
- Class: Aves
- Order: Passeriformes
- Family: Meliphagidae
- Genus: Melipotes
- Species: M. fumigatus

Binomial name
- Melipotes fumigatus Meyer, AB, 1886

= Common smoky honeyeater =

Species of bird

The common smoky honeyeater (Melipotes fumigatus) is a medium-sized bird found in central Papua New Guinea and Eastern Indonesia. It is one of four species in the Melipotes genus. The common smoky honeyeater can be identified by its charcoal-colored body and blotchy neon orange circle around its eyes.. Its diet consists of small fruits, insects, and floral plants. This bird breeds in September and October, which are considered relatively dry months, above ground or next to a tree branch.

== Description ==
The common smoky honeyeater has a bright orange splotch around both eyes. The bird's upper wing has brown tips, olive-colored edges, and a lighter shade of brown on the base of its wings. This bird has a brown and black base. The common smoky honeyeater has a brown belly with white crescent-shaped scaling and gray and brown legs. The best way to differentiate between males and females is to look at their size because male common smoky honeyeaters tend to be bigger than females.

== Habitat ==
Its habitat is in Southeast Asia, specifically in Eastern Indonesia and Central Papua New Guinea. It soars at altitudes around 1,400 to 3,400 metres (4,600 to 11,200 ft), but females and males tend to live at different altitude levels. Females live much higher in the mountains, at around 2,160 to 2,490 metres (7,090 to 8,170 ft), whereas males typically live anywhere between 1,830 and 2,160 metres (6,000 and 7,090 ft). During the common smoky honeyeater's migration season, they descend to anywhere from 750 to 1,200 metres (2,460 to 3,940 ft) in altitude.

== Vocalization ==
The common smoky honeyeater makes a "sit-sit-sit" or a faint "swift-swift-swift" sound. When it is near the young, it makes a "wheat-wheat-wheat" to alarm other common smoky honeyeaters.

== Diet and foraging ==
The common smoky honeyeater primarily eats raw fruit and fruit-like produce, but they have been observed eating various insects and floral parts. Despite its name, nectar is not a part of its diet because the common smoky honeyeater only eats fruit, insects, and floral plants. This bird consumes fruits that are typically 2 to 8 millimetres (0.079 to 0.31 in) in diameter. Common smoky honeyeaters peck at flowers that attract insects as a method to find food. This bird strikes on insects by rushing at insects with its nose down. The common smoky honeyeater is also known for driving other species away from its feeding sites. It does this by chasing away other birds, such as the Superb Bird-of-Paradise.

== Breeding ==
The common smoky honeyeater breeds above ground or near the end of a branch off a small tree. Their breeding season aligns with New Guinea's dry season, which is in September and early October. Its nest consists mainly of moss and other plant material. One nest was observed to be 14 centimetres (5.5 in) wide and 14 centimetres (5.5 in) deep. Typically, their nests are 4.5 to 12 metres or 15 to 39 feet above ground.

== See also ==
- List of birds of Papua New Guinea
