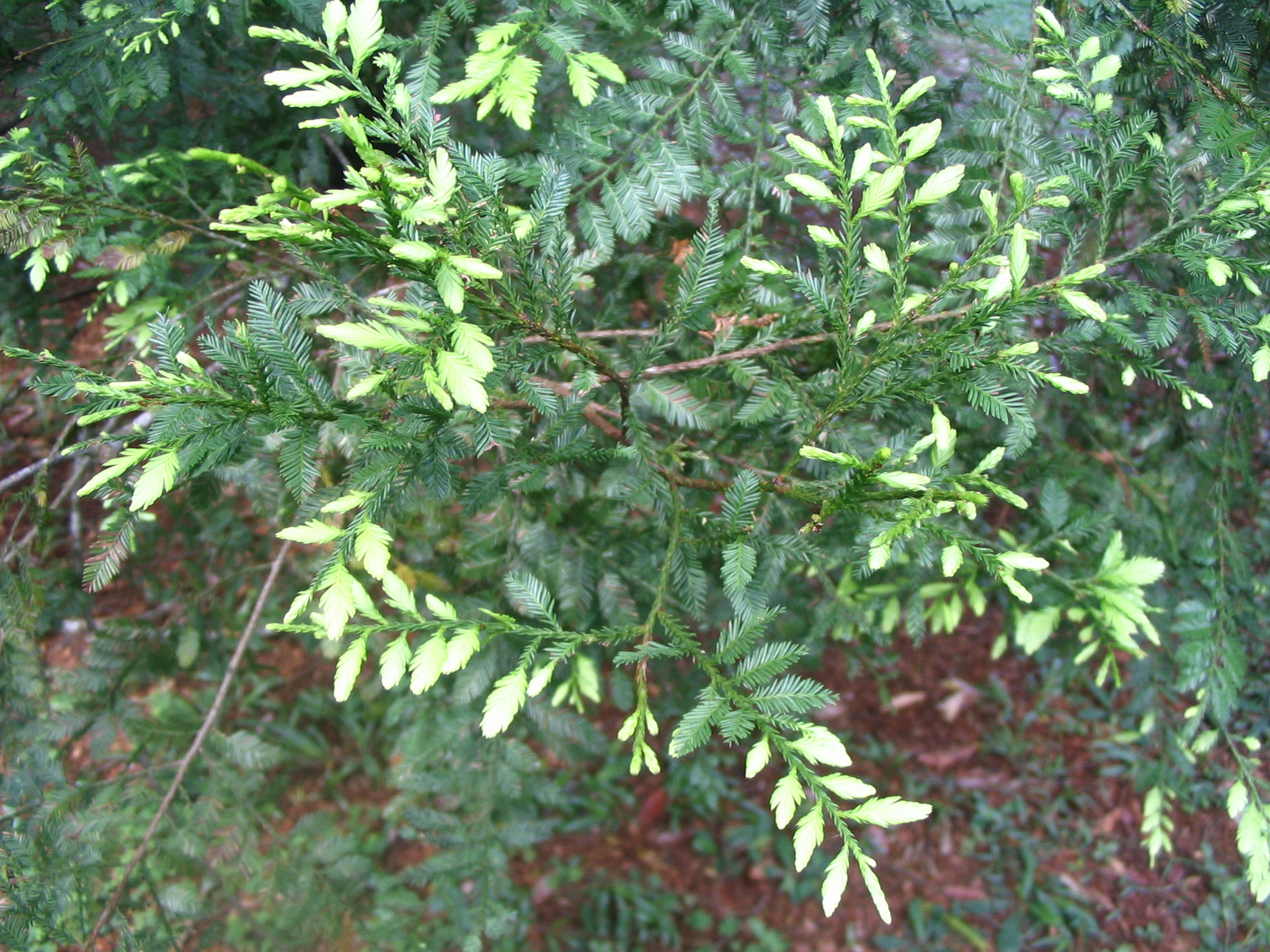
- Dacrycarpus imbricatus foliage at the Forest Research Institute Malaysia, Kepong, Selangor.

Conservation status
- Least Concern (IUCN 3.1)

Scientific classification
- Kingdom: Plantae
- Clade: Tracheophytes
- Clade: Gymnosperms
- Division: Pinophyta
- Class: Pinopsida
- Order: Araucariales
- Family: Podocarpaceae
- Genus: Dacrycarpus
- Species: D. imbricatus

Binomial name
- Dacrycarpus imbricatus (Blume) de Laub. (1969)

Synonyms
- Bracteocarpus imbricatus (Blume) A.V.Bobrov & Melikyan (1998); Nageia cupressina F.Muell. (1873), nom. superfl.; Podocarpus cupressinus R.Br. ex Benn. (1838), nom. superfl.; Podocarpus imbricatus Blume (1827)

= Dacrycarpus imbricatus =

Species of conifer

Dacrycarpus imbricatus is a species of conifer in the family Podocarpaceae. It is found in Cambodia, southern China, Fiji, Indonesia, Laos, Malaysia, Papua New Guinea, the Philippines, Thailand, Vanuatu, and Vietnam. It is a large tree that can grow up to 40 metres (130 ft) in height.

== Varieties ==
Three varieties are accepted:

- Dacrycarpus imbricatus var. curvulus (Miq.) de Laub. – Java and Sumatra
- Dacrycarpus imbricatus var. imbricatus – southern China, Indochina, Malesia, Papuasia, Vanuatu, and Fiji
- Dacrycarpus imbricatus var. robustus de Laub. – Borneo, Philippines, Maluku, and New Guinea

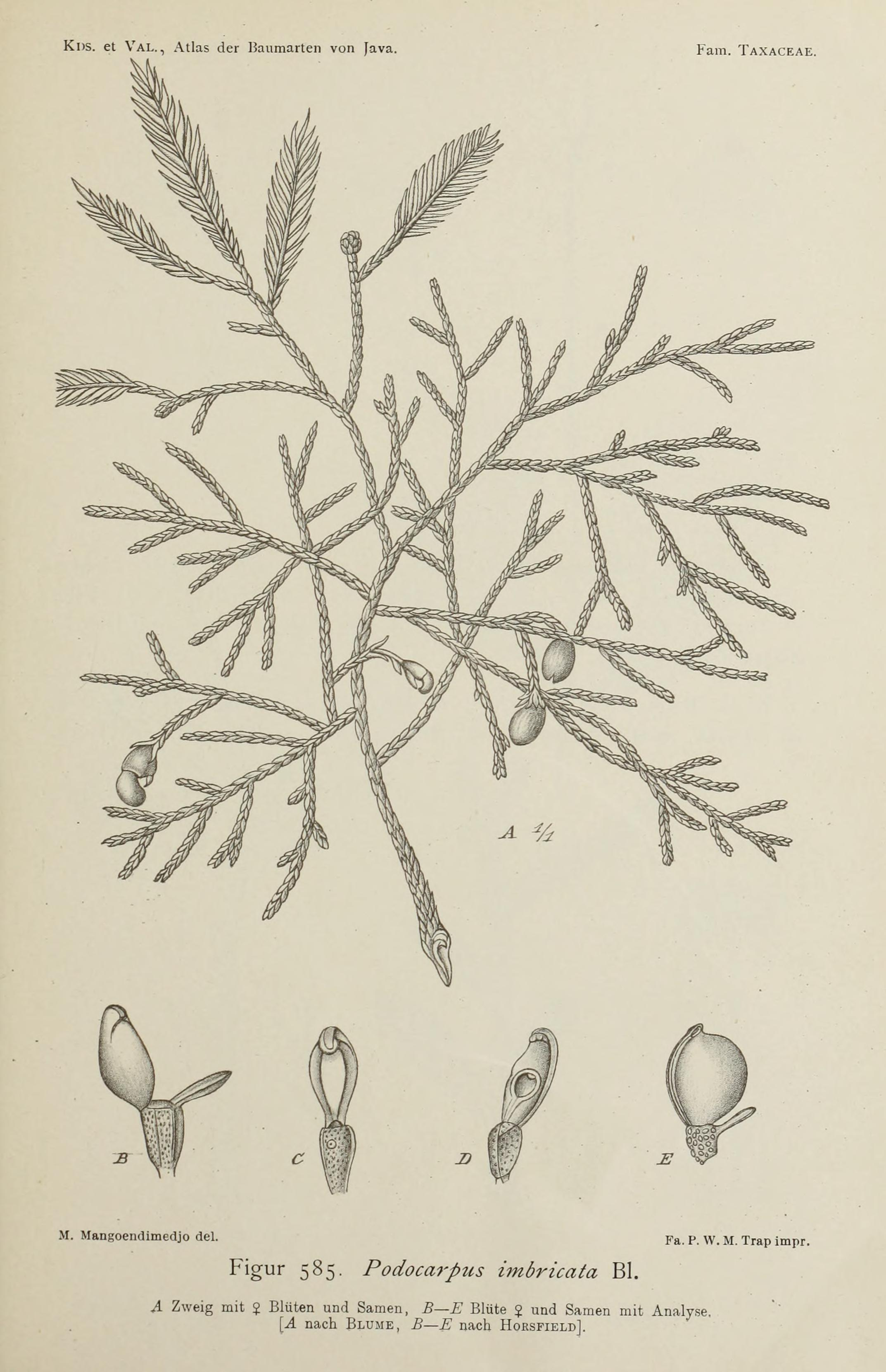
Dacrycarpus imbricatus botanical illustration.
