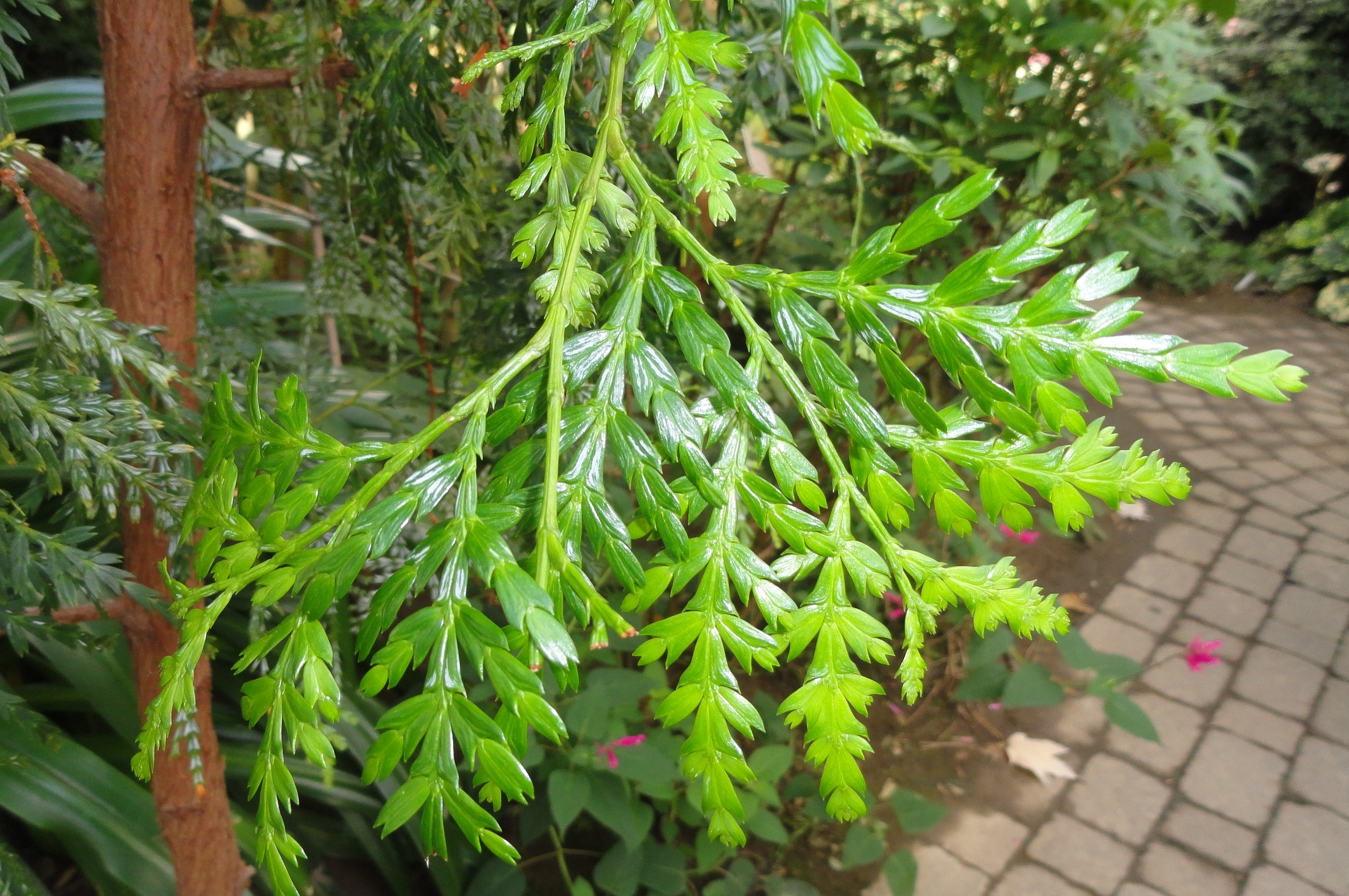

Conservation status
- Least Concern (IUCN 3.1)

Scientific classification
- Kingdom: Plantae
- Clade: Tracheophytes
- Clade: Gymnospermae
- Division: Pinophyta
- Class: Pinopsida
- Order: Cupressales
- Family: Cupressaceae
- Subfamily: Callitroideae
- Genus: Papuacedrus; H.L.Li
- Species: P. papuana

Binomial name
- Papuacedrus papuana (F.Muell.) H.L.Li

Synonyms
- Libocedrus papuana F.Muell.; Thuja papuana (F.Muell.) Voss; Libocedrus torricellensis Schlechter ex Lauterbach; Papuacedrus torricellensis (Schlechter ex Lauterbach) Li; Libocedrus arfakensis Gibbs; Papuacedrus arfakensis (Gibbs) Li

= Papuacedrus =

Papuacedrus Temporal range: Eocene–Present

Genus of conifers

Papuacedrus papuana is a species in the conifer family Cupressaceae, the sole species in the genus Papuacedrus. Some botanists do not consider this species as forming a distinct genus, but include it in the related genus Libocedrus. It is native to New Guinea and to the Indonesian province of Maluku.

It is usually a medium-sized to large evergreen tree 16–50 m tall, at high elevations only a shrub reaching up to 3 m). The foliage is borne in flat sprays, with the leaves scale-like, in opposite pairs, with facial and lateral pairs alternating; the lateral leaves are larger, 2–3 mm long on mature trees and up to 20 mm long on young trees, the facial leaves smaller, 1 mm on mature trees and up to 8 mm on young trees. The cones are 1–2 cm long, with four scales, a small, sterile basal pair, and a larger fertile pair; the fertile scales each bearing two winged seeds.

The species has two varieties, most readily distinguishable as young plants with juvenile leaves (the adult foliage being nearly indistinguishable):

- Papuacedrus papuana var. papuana (syn. Libocedrus papuana F.Muell., Libocedrus torricellensis Schltr., Papuacedrus torricellensis (Schltr.) H.L.Li). New Guinea, east of 138°E longitude; 620–3,800 m elevation. Juvenile leaves with a spreading, hook-like apex.
- Papuacedrus papuana var. arfakensis (Gibbs) R.J.Johns (syn. Libocedrus arfakensis Gibbs, Papuacedrus arfakensis (Gibbs) H.L.Li). New Guinea, west of 138°E longitude, Moluccas; 700–2,400 m elevation. Juvenile leaves not spreading, the apex not free from the shoot.

A fossil species, Papuacedrus prechilensis, is known from the Eocene of Argentina.
