= List of lighthouses in Indonesia =

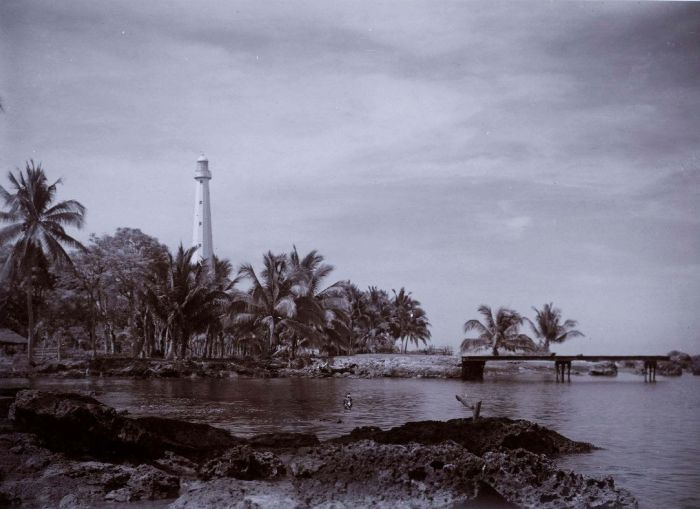
Cikoneng lighthouse was built in the 19th century to replace the earlier lighthouse which was completely destroyed by the tsunami caused by the 1883 eruption of Krakatau.

The Indonesian word for a lighthouse is mercusuar or sometimes menara suar.

Below is a list of lighthouses in Indonesia. The list is divided into regions. Tanjung and ujung are words for capes, pulau is an island, selat is a strait, karang is a reef, and teluk is a bay/gulf.

== Sumatra ==
Sumatra is the westernmost of the major islands of Indonesia. It is separated from Malaysia to the north by the Malacca Strait, from Borneo to the northeast by the broad Karimata Strait, and from Java to the southeast by the Sunda Strait.

Lighthouse	Location	Province	Established	Height (meter)	Focal plane	Status	Image	Remarks
Breueh / Pulau Brueh / Pulau Bras / Willemstoren (former)	Breueh Island	Aceh	1875	44 m	160 m	Active		Round stone tower with lantern and gallery, painted red and white. The lighthouse marks the extreme northwestern corner of Indonesia, Weh Island. Breueh was devastated by the Boxing Day tsunami, but the lighthouse was far above the waves, although some of its support buildings were destroyed. There are ecotours to the island, and the light station is accessible by road.
Pulau Batu Mandi / Batu Mandi	Batu Mandi Island	Riau	?	40 m	43 m	Active		A square skeletal tower with lantern and gallery, mounted on a 2-story concrete keeper's house. Entire lighthouse painted white. The station is staffed by the Indonesian Navy. Located on a rocky reef near the center of the Malacca Strait, about 13 km east of Pulau Jemur.
Pulau Lengkuas / Langkuas	Lengkuas Island	Bangka-Belitung Islands	1883	57 m	61 m	Active		A 16-sided cast iron tower, painted white with lantern and gallery. This lighthouse is just off the northern point of Belitung, facing the Karimata Strait, which joins the South China Sea to the Java Sea between Sumatra and Kalimantan. It was prefabricated by Enthoven at The Hague.
Takong Kecil / Pulau Takong Kecil	Takong Kecil Island	Riau Islands	? (station established 1910)	30 m	48 m	Active		A tapered octagonal aluminum tower painted in white. The present lighthouse was apparently built sometime shortly after World War II. It was rebuilt in 1998 and its height may have been increased at that time. Eastbound vessels in the strait pass just to the south of the lighthouse. Located on a small island in the strait about 7 km southwest of Singapore's Raffles Lighthouse.
Tanjung Cukuhbalambing (Vlakken Hoek, Balimbing, Belimbing)	Tanjung Cukuhbalambing	Lampung	1880	58 m	63 m	Active (fragile condition)		16-sided cast iron tower with lantern and gallery, painted white. Prefabricated at The Hague by Enthoven and Co., this historic lighthouse marks the southern point of Sumatra; it is a landfall light for eastbound ships approaching the Sunda Strait. The tsunami waves created by the eruption of Krakatoa in August 1883 damaged the first floor of the lighthouse and destroyed the keeper's house and other station buildings. The light station is now included in the Tambling Wildlife Nature Conservation
Tanjung Kelian / Kalian	Belitung Regency	Bangka–Belitung Islands	? (station established 1862)	50 m	38 m	Active		A round stone tower with lantern and gallery. Lighthouse painted white with a red horizontal band near the top. This lighthouse guides ships entering the Bangka Strait, which separates Sumatra from island of Bangka. In March 2006 the lighthouse was vandalized, the thieves taking some of the ironwork.
Ujung Batumandi / Ujung Sungei Bramei, Padang		West Sumatra	? (station established 1891)	14 m	161 m	Active		Second lighthouse in the station. A white round concrete tower with lantern and gallery, rising from a one-storeyed keeper's house. The original lighthouse was a skeletal tower with lantern.

== Java ==
Java is the world's most populous island with more than 130 million residents. The national capital, Jakarta, is on the northwestern coast of Java.

Lighthouse	Location	Province	Established	Height (meter)	Focal plane	Status	Image	Remarks
Cikoneng (Anyer, Tjikoneng, Vierde Punt, Fourth Point)	Tanjung Cikoneng	Banten	1885 (station established 1855)	58 m	60 m	Active		The lighthouse was prefabricated at The Hague in the Netherlands by Enthoven and Co. It is one of the very few Indonesian lighthouses readily accessible to tourists. The original lighthouse was destroyed by tsunami waves triggered by the catastrophic explosion of the Krakatoa volcano on 27 August 1883. These waves were at least 30 m (100 ft) high, obliterating all traces of the original light station.
Cimiring / Tjimiring / Cilacap / Nusakambangan		Central Java	1870	32 m	178 m	Active		A white-painted round stone tower with lantern and gallery. Located at the east end of the island of Nusakambangan, marking the entrance to the port of Cilacap.
Jaga Utara, North Watcher, Noord Wachter (former) / Pulau Sebira	Sebira Island	Jakarta	1869	48 m	48.5 m	Active		The oldest surviving Dutch lighthouse in Indonesia. A 16-sided cast iron skeletal tower with lantern, gallery, central cylinder, and a 1-story keeper's house enclosed in the base. Lighthouse painted white. Located on the northernmost island of Thousand Islands archipelago.
Jakarta West Mole	North Jakarta	Jakarta	1862	16 m	17 m	Active		A round stone tower, painted white. It is now located adjacent to the Jakarta Fish Port.
Karang Mas / Gosong Karangmas / Meinderts Reef, Meindertsdroogte (former)	Karangmas Shoal	East Java	?	16 m	22 m	Active		Black-painted with one red horizontal band, mounted on a platform supported by piles. It is the second lighthouse in the shoal, which sits on the base of the earlier lighthouse. The earlier lighthouse existed in the 1930s and was used as a significant navigation aid and landmark, which survived until at least the 1950s. Located about 15 km offshore at the southern entrance to Madura Strait.
Klirong	Kebumen Regency	Central Java	early 2010s	35 m	42 m	Active		Eight-sided concrete tower with four galleries and a lantern. Tower is painted white, and the top gallery is painted red.
Pulau Biawak / Pulau Rakit / Boompjes Eiland (former)	Pulau Biawak	West Java	1872	14 m	14 m	Active		16-sided cast iron skeletal tower with lantern, gallery, and central cylinder. This lighthouse was prefabricated by Leiden in the Netherlands. The present lantern was added in 1911. Located on a small island about 65 km northeast of Kandanghaur in the Java Sea.
Semarang / Tanjung Emmas	Semarang	Central Java	1883 (station established 1872)	30 m	33 m	Active		12-sided cast iron tower painted in white. It contains a lantern and a gallery.
Sembilangan / Ujung Slempit / Range Rear	Sembilangan Island	East Java	1882	50 m	53 m	Active		White-painted cast iron tower with lantern and gallery. Located on Sembilangan Island off the extreme western tip of Madura. The lighthouse is both a landfall light and the rear light of a range guiding ships into the channel between Madura and Java to approach the port of Surabaya.
Tanjung Layar / Ujung Kulon, First Point / Eerste Punt (former)	Tanjung Layar	Banten	? (station established 1877)	30 m	50 m	Active	The second lighthouse in the station, now demolished and replaced by a metal framework tower.	The current lighthouse is the fourth lighthouse in the point. It is a square tapered metal framework tower, painted white. There are several keeper's houses and other station buildings. The area is included in the Ujung Kulon National Park. Previous brick lighthouses has been damaged by earthquake on 1 September 1880 and another in 1906.

== Sunda Islands ==
Lighthouse	Location	Province	Established	Height (meter)	Focal plane	Status	Image	Remarks
Kupang / Koepang / Fort Concordia	Kupang	East Nusa Tenggara	?	13 m	25 m	Active		It is a skeletal tower painted white. Current lighthouse is the second structure in the point, replacing an earlier Dutch lighthouse.
Tanjung Bungkulan	Bungkulan, Buleleng Regency	Bali	?	28 m	32 m	Active		A white-painted, square pyramidal skeletal tower with gallery. Köhler's photo is at the top of this page, and Google has a satellite view. It is located at the northernmost point of Bali, about 15 km northeast of Singaraja.

== Kalimantan ==
Lighthouse	Location	Province	Established	Height (meter)	Focal plane	Status	Image	Remarks
Balikpapan / Tanjung Tokong / Tukong Hill	Tanjung Tokong	East Kalimantan	?	30 m	93 m	Active		A square skeletal tower with gallery, painted with red and white horizontal bands. The lighthouse marks the entrance to the harbor of Balikpapan. During World War II, Japanese troops took Balikpapan in January 1942 and held it until it was taken by Australian forces in heavy fighting in July 1945.
Pulau Beras Basah		East Kalimantan	?	35 m	36 m	Active		A square pyramidal skeletal tower with gallery. The tower has been enclosed with metal plates. The lighthouse is located on the beach of Beras Basah, a popular resort island almost on the Equator.

== Sulawesi ==
Sulawesi (Celebes) consists of four narrow peninsulas. The Makassar Strait is to the west, separating Sulawesi from Kalimantan (Borneo) to the west. The Celebes Sea is north of the island, the Banda Sea is to the east and southeast, and the Flores Sea is on the south. Makassar is the major port.

Lighthouse	Location	Province	Established	Height (meter)	Focal plane	Status	Image	Remarks
Fort Rotterdam	Makassar	South Sulawesi		?	?	Demolished		

== Maluku ==
Lighthouse	Location	Province	Established	Height (meter)	Focal plane	Status	Image	Remarks
Meatiy Miarang / Meaty Miarang / Meatimiarang / Brisbane Island		Maluku	1903	23 m	25 m	Active		A hexagonal skeletal tower with lantern and gallery, painted white. The lighthouse marks an extensive and dangerous reef system midway between Pulau Lakor, in the Leti group, and Pulau Sermata, the largest island of the Sermata group. Located on a small island at the south end of the reef. Accessible only by boat.
Pulau Liran / Wetar Strait	Liran Island	Maluku	2010 (station established 1903)	40 m	85 m	Active	The first lighthouse in Liran.	A white-painted square skeletal tower with lantern and gallery. The original lighthouse was a hexagonal skeletal tower with lantern and gallery; This lighthouse is important in guiding ships toward Timor.
Tanjung Nusanive / Nusaniwe / Noesanive		Maluku	?	30 m	138 m	Active	The original lighthouse of the Tanjung Nusanive station.	A skeletal tower with gallery, painted white. Located at the southern tip of Ambon island, about 13 km. The current lighthouse replaced the original 21 m hexagonal skeletal tower with gallery.

== Papua ==
The Dutch extended their claim to western New Guinea, world's second-largest island, in 1828, but they established no major settlements until nearly 1900. West Papua remained under Dutch control until 1963, when it was ceded to Indonesia. The principal towns today are Jayapura (formerly Hollandia) and Manokwari in the north, Sorong at the west end of the island, and Merauke in the south.

Lighthouse	Location	Province	Established	Height (meter)	Focal plane	Status	Image	Remarks
Oinake	Watung, Jayapura Regency	Papua	1990s?	37 m	200 m	Active		Octagonal concrete tower with lantern and gallery. The lighthouse is unpainted white concrete. It is located at the border between Indonesian Papua and the independent nation of Papua New Guinea, near the town of Watung, Papua New Guinea, and about 50 km (30 mi) east of Jayapura, the capital of Indonesia's Papua province.
Pulau Boo Besar	Raja Ampat Islands	West Papua	?	30 m	34 m	Active		An octagonal white concrete tower with gallery; lantern removed. The Royal Australian Navy has an article mentioning that its ships Hawkesbury and Cape Leeuwin established (or re-established) this light in July 1945 to reopen the shipping lane through the East Indies.
Tanjung Saukorem / Saukorem	Saukorem	West Papua	?	30 m	32 m	Active		A white-painted iron skeletal tower. Located about 125 km north northwest of Manokwari

== See also ==
- Lists of lighthouses and lightvessels
