= Cape Leeuwin (disambiguation) =

Cape Leeuwin is the most south-westerly point of the Australian mainland.

Cape Leeuwin may also refer to the following subjects:

- Cape Leeuwin Lighthouse, a lighthouse on Cape Leeuwin
- HMAS Cape Leeuwin, a lighthouse tender built in 1924, and in naval service during World War II
- Paraserianthes lophantha or Cape Leeuwin Wattle, a species of wattle tree native to the coastal regions of south-west Australia
- The St Alouarn Islands off Cape Leeuwin are sometimes referred to as the Cape Leeuwin Islands

== See also ==
- Leeuwin
