= Saukorem =

Saukorem Kampung Saukorem
- Village
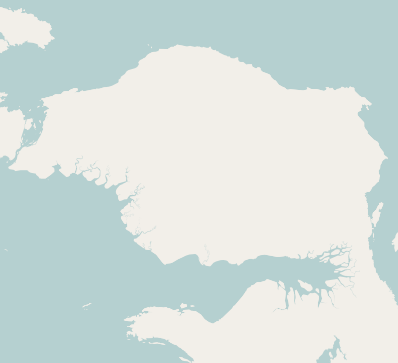
- Location of the town in the Bird's Head Peninsula
- Coordinates: 0°34′S 133°10′E
- Country: Indonesia
- Province: Southwest Papua
- Regency: Tambrauw
- District: Amberbaken

Area
  - Total: 59.93 km^{2} (23.14 sq mi)

Population (2021)
  - Total: 246
  - Density: 5.09/km^{2} (13.2/sq mi)
- Time zone: UTC+9 (WIT)

Saukorem (also Tanjung Saukorem, Saoekorem or Saokorem) is a coastal village in Amberbaken, Tambrauw Regency of Southwest Papua, Indonesia, located about 125 km (75 mi) north-northwest of Manokwari. The town is located on the northern coast of the Bird's Head Peninsula and administratively it is the principal settlement of Amberbaken subdistrict of the Tambrauw.

== History ==
The village was occupied by the Dutch under the Dutch East Indies and they gave it its name, originally spelled "Saoekorem" or "Saokorem". A Sergeant Mandala was reported to have been posted to Saukorem. Christian missionaries were active in the area and were reported as having moved on from here through the Kebar Valley. Rice is grown on dry ground in the district near the shore. On March 16, 1994, a video story named "Kaman ja Squash seed" was filmed in the village by a 40-year-old man named Markus Wabia.

== Geography ==
Saukorem lies in the northwestern part of Papua on the north of the Birds' Head Peninsula. The village lies on a beach in a small bay known as Dore Bay with coast headland jutting outwards to the northwest of the village. Villages in the vicinity include Roewe or Rewe (11 miles to the west), Maiami and Manganeki. To the southeast of the village a major river, known as the Wampai River flows into the sea and the Wepe River is also said to flow nearby Saukorem. South of the village lies the Kebar Valley and the Tamrau Mountains, with an altitude of no less than 2500 m. It contains populations of heron. The Kebar Valley further inland in parts lies at 2000 feet or 600 metres above sea level. A notable path runs through the valley and mountains connecting the village to the settlement of Andai and reaches an altitude of 1200 metres.

== Lighthouse ==
The village lies on the northern part of Geelvink Bay on a smaller bay known as Dore Bay and there is said to be a channel which allows boats to easily land, whatever the state of the tide and surf.

A lighthouse is located at Saukorem, located 14 miles east-southeast of Saukris. It is a white 30 m (98 ft) iron skeletal structure with a 32 m (105 ft) focal plane with two white flashes every 10 seconds.

== Demographics ==
The village is home to the Abun, Dore and the Wabia peoples who made their centre in a place called Wepai in the village of Saukorem. The Abun living in Saukorem are reported to have children not only with partners of other families but with cousins and distant relatives which may affect the parent's views of which children are truly "biological" or not. The people of Saukorem and this area of the Bird's Head peninsula are said to produce wooden figures which are known as Korwar figures. They are often made with glass beads for eyes and a neckband made of bark-cloth and with the skulls of deceased family members. The Korwar figures in particular which are made with skulls are said to provide an abode for spirits of the departed and are believed to safeguard the vital force which is contained within the skull of the deceased. The locals are also noted for their independent production of bark-cloth. Some of the Dore women of the village tattoo their breasts and face in a ritual which it is called "pa," performed with thorns and using charcoal to rub over the bloody spots. The locals are said to be particularly adept at canoe building, producing a canoe known as a Geelvink Bay canoe which has a high affix to the bow and to the stern end-piece.
