= Irau =

Irau or IRAU could refer to:

- Bon Irau, mountain in West Papua, Indonesia
- Insurance Regulatory Authority of Uganda, Ugandan government agency
- Mount Irau, mountain in Malaysia
