= List of shipwrecks in May 1889 =

The list of shipwrecks in May 1889 includes ships sunk, foundered, grounded, or otherwise lost during May 1889.

== 1 May ==
List of shipwrecks: 1 May 1889
| Ship | State | Description |
|---|---|---|
| Bluebell | United Kingdom | The barque capsized and sank at Felixtowe, Suffolk with the loss of her captain. |
| Clan Forbes | United Kingdom | The steamship ran aground at Bowling, Dunbartonshire. She was on a voyage from Glasgow, Renfrewshire to Liverpool, Lancashire. She was refloated and resumed her voyage. |

== 2 May ==
List of shipwrecks: 2 May 1889
| Ship | State | Description |
|---|---|---|
| Garibaldi | Norway | The barque sank in the Atlantic Ocean 60 nautical miles (110 km) of the Butt of Lewis, Outer Hebrides, United Kingdom. Her nine crew were rescued bhy Alice Gertrude (United Kingdom). Garibaldi was on a voyage from Liverpool, Lancashire, United Kingdom to Vyborg, Grand Duchy of Finland. |
| Prins Frederick | Flag unknown | The steamship ran aground at Suez, Egypt. She was refloated the next day. |

== 3 May ==
List of shipwrecks: 3 May 1889
| Ship | State | Description |
|---|---|---|
| Torro del Oro | Spain | The steamship was run into by the steamship Merjulio (Spain) in the Bay of Gibraltar and sprang a severe leak. |

== 4 May ==
List of shipwrecks: 4 May 1889
| Ship | State | Description |
|---|---|---|
| Ismayer | United Kingdom | The schooner was severely damaged by fire at South Shields, County Durham. |

== 6 May ==
List of shipwrecks: 6 May 1889
| Ship | State | Description |
|---|---|---|
| Nellie Swift | United States | The barquentine foundered in the Atlantic Ocean with the loss of all eleven crew. She was on a voyage from the West Indies to New York. |
| Terlings | United Kingdom | The steamship ran aground at Seaham, County Durham. Her fifteen crew were rescued by the Seaham Lifeboat. |

== 7 May ==
List of shipwrecks: 7 May 1889
| Ship | State | Description |
|---|---|---|
| Cumbrian | United Kingdom | The ship ran aground off Saltburn-by-the-Sea, Yorkshire. |

== 8 May ==
List of shipwrecks: 8 May 1889
| Ship | State | Description |
|---|---|---|
| Rugia | Germany | The steamship caught fire at sea. She was on a voyage from New York, United States to Hamburg. The fire was extinguished. She put in to Plymouth, Devon, United Kingdom on 12 May. |

== 9 May ==
List of shipwrecks: 9 May 1889
| Ship | State | Description |
|---|---|---|
| Mabel | United States | The fishing boat sprang a leak ten miles (16 km) east of Chatham, Massachusetts and sank. Her crew of three were rescued after rowing for several hours. |

== 10 May ==
List of shipwrecks: 10 May 1889
| Ship | State | Description |
|---|---|---|
| Rockliffe | United Kingdom | The steamship ran aground 4 nautical miles (7.4 km) north west of the Ashrafi Lighthouse. Egypt. |
| Stag | United Kingdom | The steamship was driven ashore at Stornoway, Isle of Lewis, Outer Hebrides. She was on a voyage from New Orleans, Louisiana, United States to Fredrikshavn, Denmark. |

== 11 May ==
List of shipwrecks: 11 May 1889
| Ship | State | Description |
|---|---|---|
| Archimedes | Denmark | The brig ran aground on the Middelgrund, in the Baltic Sea. She was on a voyage from Bo'ness, Lothian, United Kingdom to Stralsund, Germany. She was refloated with assistance and resumed her voyage. |
| Helios | Austria-Hungary | The steamship ran aground at "Toulcha", Romania. She was refloated and resumed her voyage. |
| Nar | United Kingdom | The steamship was driven ashore on Sheep Island, County Antrim. She was on a voyage from Garston, Lancashire to Londonderry. She was later refloated and taken in to Ballintoy, County Antrim in a severely leaky condition. |
| St. Jean | France | The sloop foundered off Godrevy, Cornwall, United Kingdom. Her crew were rescued by the steamship Heimdal (United Kingdom). St. Jean was on a voyage from Lannion, Côtes-du-Nord to Cardiff, Glamorgan, United Kingdom. |

== 12 May ==
List of shipwrecks: 12 May 1889
| Ship | State | Description |
|---|---|---|
| Alaskan | United States | Painting of Alaskan sinking. The sidewheel paddle steamer sank in a storm in the Pacific Ocean off Cape Blanco, Oregon, killing at least 21 people. Ten or eleven people reached shore after spending three days in a lifeboat and then swimming to shore, one of the survivors drowned in the attempt. |
| Benjamin Sewall | United States | The barque collided with Sutlej (United Kingdom) and then ran ashore at Camden Fort, County Cork, United Kingdom. She was refloated with the assistance of two tugs and taken in to Queenstown, County Cork. |
| Four Brothers | United Kingdom | The barque was towed in to Dover, Kent in a waterlogged condition. She was on a voyage from London to Dover. |
| Retreiver | United Kingdom | The steam lighter sprang a leak and was beached at Fife Ness, Fife. Her crew survived. She was on a voyage from Methil, Fife to Montrose, Forfarshire. |
| Rheidol | United Kingdom | The schooner was driven ashore near Lydd, Kent. She was refloated and resumed her voyage. |

== 13 May ==
List of shipwrecks: 13 May 1889
| Ship | State | Description |
|---|---|---|
| Alaskan | United States | The steamship broke in two and foundered off Cape Blanco, Oregon with the loss of at least five of the 54 people on board. Thirteen people were rescued, 36 were reported missing. |
| Crosshill | United Kingdom | The steamship ran aground on the Domesnes Reef, in the Baltic Sea. She was refloated. |
| Isaac Reed | United States | The full-rigged ship was driven ashore at Dunany Point, County Louth, United Kingdom. She was refloated. |
| Osvaldo | Spain | The schooner was driven ashore and wrecked at Montevideo, Uruguay with the loss of three of her crew. |
| Staincliffe | United Kingdom | The steamship collided with the steamship Benella (United Kingdom) at Middlesbrough, County Durham and was damaged. |

== 14 May ==
List of shipwrecks: 14 May 1889
| Ship | State | Description |
|---|---|---|
| Adelaide | United Kingdom | The brigantine was run into by a steamship off the Kentish Knock and was severely damaged. She was on a voyage from Fowey, Cornwall to Goole, Yorkshire. She was towed in to Ramsgate, Kent in a leaky condition. |
| Arla | Sweden | The steamship ran aground on the Sprogø East Reef, in the Baltic Sea. She was refloated the next day with assistance and taken in to Korsør, Denmark. |
| America | United Kingdom | The full-rigged ship was driven ashore at Dungeness, Kent. She was on a voyage from Hamburg, Germany to Adelaide, Queensland. She was refloated with the assistance of the tug Conqueror (United Kingdom). |
| Carl Emil | (Russian Empire) Grand Duchy of Finland | The ship was towed in to the River Tyne in a derelict condition. |

== 15 May ==
List of shipwrecks: 15 May 1889
| Ship | State | Description |
|---|---|---|
| Belle of Benin | United Kingdom | The ship was driven ashore at Sangatte, Pas-de-Calais, France. |
| Collingwood | United Kingdom | The steamship was wrecked south of Viana do Castelo, Portugal. All on board were rescued by the sloop Louis Gustave (France). Collingwood was on a voyage from Newport, Monmouthshire to Porto, Portugal. |
| George Fox | United Kingdom | The brig collided with the dredger No. 2 (United Kingdom) and sank in the River Thames at Erith, London. |
| Leon | Norway | The brigantine was driven ashore at the South Foreland, Kent. She was on a voyage from Rochefort, Charente-Inférieure, France to Sundsvall, Sweden. She was refloated with assistance from the tug Contest (United Kingdom) and taken in to Dover, Kent. |
| Marie | Germany | The barque ran aground in the Mettelplatte, in the Weser. She was on a voyage from Le Havre, Seine-Inférieure, France to Bremen. |
| Thornhill | United Kingdom | The steamship ran aground in the Black Sea. She was refloated. |

== 16 May ==
List of shipwrecks: 16 May 1889
| Ship | State | Description |
|---|---|---|
| Champion | United States | The schooner was run down and sunk by the schooner Willie Parkman (United States) five miles (8.0 km) off Thacher's Island. Crew saved. |
| Emiliano | Spain | The steamship caught fire at sea. She was on a voyage from New Orleans, Louisiana, United States to Liverpool, Lancashire, United Kingdom. She put in to Queenstown, County Cork, United Kingdom on 18 May and the fire was extinguished. |
| Marchioness of Londonderry | United Kingdom | The steamship collided with the steamship Forth and foundered in the North Sea 3 nautical miles (5.6 km) off Whitby, Yorkshire. Marchioness of Londonderry was on a voyage from Sunderland, County Durham to Amsterdam, North Holland, Netherlands. |
| Rex | Norway | The brig collided with another ship off Great Yarmouth, Norfolk, United Kingdom and was damaged. She was on a voyage from Kragerø, Denmark to Wivenhoe, Essex, United Kingdom. |
| Velfaed | Norway | The ship departed from Cardiff, Glamorgan, United Kingdom for Mozambique. She was sighted off Lundy Island, Devon, later that day. No further trace, reported missing. |

== 17 May ==
List of shipwrecks: 17 May 1889
| Ship | State | Description |
|---|---|---|
| Julie | United Kingdom | The barque was wrecked at the mouth of the Rio Grande. Her fourteen crew survived. She was on a voyage from Newport, Monmouthshire to Rosario, Argentina. |
| M.F. Merrick | United States | Carrying a cargo of sand, the wooden schooner sank in 310 feet (94 m) of water in Lake Huron off Presque Isle, Michigan, at 45.4705°N 83.44625°W after the steamer R. P. Ranney (United States) accidentally rammed her. |
| Rapel | Chile | The steamship struck a sunken rock in the Smyth Channel and foundered. |
| Tana | United Kingdom | The steamship ran aground off Kettleness, Yorkshire. She was on a voyage from Riga, Russia to West Hartlepool, County Durham. She was refloated with the assistance of a steam trawler. |

== 18 May ==
List of shipwrecks: 18 May 1889
| Ship | State | Description |
|---|---|---|
| Algoma | United States | The steamship ran aground off Long Branch, New Jersey. She was on a voyage from Rio de Janeiro to New York. |
| Bilbao | United Kingdom | The steamship collided with the Thames barge Caprice (United Kingdom) in the River Thames and was beached at the Isle of Dogs, London. |
| German Emperor | United Kingdom | The steamship was run into by the steamship Beresford (United Kingdom) and sank south of the East Goodwin Lightship ( Trinity House) with the loss of fifteen of the 22 people on board. Survivors were rescued by Beresford. German Emperor was on a voyage from Bilbao, Spain to Bo'Ness, Lothian. |
| Servia | United Kingdom | The steamship ran aground in Gedney's Channel, New York Harbor, United States. She was refloated the next day and resumed her voyage. |

== 19 May ==
List of shipwrecks: 19 May 1889
| Ship | State | Description |
|---|---|---|
| Charlotte Webb | United States | The pilot boat was run down by the steamship Normandie (France) in a dense fog eight miles (13 km) east of Sandy Hook, New Jersey. The pilot boat sank in three minutes. Two pilots on Charlotte Webb were lost in the accident. |
| Zabrina | United Kingdom | The schooner collided with the steamship White Sea (United Kingdom) in the North Sea off Scarborough, Yorkshire and was damaged. Zabrina put in to the River Tyne. |

== 21 May ==
List of shipwrecks: 21 May 1889
| Ship | State | Description |
|---|---|---|
| Burry | United Kingdom | The steamship was wrecked on Skokholm, Pembrokeshire. Her crew were rescued. She was on a voyage from Llanelly, Glamorgan to Liverpool, Lancashire. |

== 22 May ==
List of shipwrecks: 22 May 1889
| Ship | State | Description |
|---|---|---|
| Blanche | United Kingdom | The steamship collided with the steamship Black Diamond (United Kingdom) at Ayr and was beached. |
| Cynthia | United Kingdom | The steamship collided with the steamship Polynesian (United Kingdom) and sank in the Saint Lawrence River 12 nautical miles (22 km) downstream of Montreal, Quebec, Canada with the loss of eight lives. |
| Ohio | United States | The whaling barque became unmanageable after her hull was stove in by ice and was blown ashore and wrecked on Nunivak Island, District of Alaska. Her crew survived and were rescued from the island by the barque Ocean (United States). |
| Sherbourne | United Kingdom | The steamship ran aground on the Goodwin Sands, Kent. She was refloated with assistance from Seaman's Glory (United Kingdom) and resumed her voyage. |
| Tighnamara | United Kingdom | The steam yacht was severely damaged by fire in the Holy Loch. She was subsequently towed in to Greenock, Renfrewshire for repairs. |

== 23 May ==
List of shipwrecks: 23 May 1889
| Ship | State | Description |
|---|---|---|
| Nyaza | Flag unknown | The steamship collided with the steamship Curfew (Flag unknown) and sank in the Great Bitter Lake. All on board were rescued. |

== 24 May ==
List of shipwrecks: 24 May 1889
| Ship | State | Description |
|---|---|---|
| Paradox | United Kingdom | The steamship was run into by the steamship Panther (United Kingdom) and sank in the River Thames at Gravesend, Kent. Paradox was on a voyage from London to Goole, Yorkshire. She was refloated on 16 June. |
| Steelfield | United Kingdom | The full-rigged ship was sighted on this date whilst on a voyage from Liverpool, Lancashire to Callao, Peru. No further trace, presumed foundered with the loss of all hands. |

== 25 May ==
List of shipwrecks: 25 May 1889
| Ship | State | Description |
|---|---|---|
| Nesta, and HMS Surprise | United Kingdom; Royal Navy | The steamship Nesta collided with HMS Surprise and sank in the Mediterranean Sea 130 nautical miles (240 km) east of Malta with the loss of a crew member. Survivors were rescued by HMS Surprise, which was consequently beached at Syracuse, Sicily, Italy. |

== 27 May ==
List of shipwrecks: 27 May 1889
| Ship | State | Description |
|---|---|---|
| Entella | Italy | The brigantine was abandoned in the Atlantic Ocean. Her crew were rescued by the brigantine Ebenezer Parry (United Kingdom). |
| Servia | United Kingdom | The steamship arrived at Liverpool, Lancashire from New York City, United States on fire. The fire was extinguished. |

== 28 May ==
List of shipwrecks: 28 May 1889
| Ship | State | Description |
|---|---|---|
| Abergrange, and Dalbeattie | United Kingdom | The steamships collided at Middlesbrough, Yorkshire and were both severely damaged. Dalbeattie was on a voyage from Middlesbrough to Stockholm, Sweden. |
| Several unnamed vessels | Canada | The ships were wrecked on the shores of Lake Ontario with loss of live. One vessel was lost with all hands. |

== 31 May ==
List of shipwrecks: 31 May 1889
| Ship | State | Description |
|---|---|---|
| Nippoli Accame | Italy | The barque caught fire off Europa Point, Gibraltar. Her crew took to the boats. She was on a voyage from Marseille, Bouches-du-Rhône, France to Réunion. |
| President von Blumenthal | Germany | The barque was driven ashore at Shoeburyness, Essex, United Kingdom. She was refloated with the assistance of a tug. |

== Unknown date ==
List of shipwrecks: Unknown date in May 1889
| Ship | State | Description |
|---|---|---|
| Alfen | United Kingdom | The schooner was driven ashore at Hornsea, Yorkshire, United Kingdom. She was on a voyage from Arendal to Boston, Lincolnshire, United Kingdom. She was refloated and completed her voyage. |
| Ariel | Flag unknown | The ship foundered in the North Sea 20 to 30 nautical miles (37 to 56 km) off the coast of Aberdeenshire, United Kingdom. |
| Australia | Flag unknown | The steamship was damaged by fire at San Francisco, California, United States. |
| Boroma | United Kingdom | The ship was wrecked on the coast of the Newfoundland Colony. Her crew were rescued. She was on a voyage from Liverpool, Lancashire to Richibucto, New Brunswick, Canada. |
| Chiltern | United Kingdom | The steamship ran aground in the River Thames at Hookness Point, Woolwich, London. |
| Cipro | Greece | The brig ran aground off Cape Maleas. She was refloated and taken in to Malta in a leaky condition. |
| Città di Bari | Italy | The steamship was wrecked on a reef off Alderney, Channel Islands. |
| City of Cleveland | United States | The steamship was driven ashore and severely damaged at Two Harbors, California. |
| Clydesdale | United Kingdom | The steamship was driven ashore on the north point of Öland, Sweden. She was on a voyage from Glasgow, Renfrewshire to Cronstadt, Russia. |
| Comal | United States | The steamship collided with Guayandotte (Flag unknown) and was severely damaged. Comal was on a voyage from New York to Galveston, Texas. |
| Denia | United Kingdom | The steamship ran aground at Fort George, Inverness-shire. She was on a voyage from London to Inverness. |
| Edda | Norway | The barque was driven ashore. She was refloated with assistance on 10 May. |
| Elektra | United Kingdom | The ship put in to Penang, Straits Settlements on fire. The fire was extinguished. |
| Emilie | Germany | The barque was discovered at sea dismasted and derelict. She was towed in to Lisbon, Portugal by a Portuguese steamship. |
| Enchanter | United Kingdom | The barque foundered in the Pacific Ocean. Her crew were rescued by the barque Wanlock (United Kingdom). Enchanter was on a voyage from Sydney, New South Wales to Panama City, Colombia. |
| Escalona | Flag unknown | The steamship was driven ashore at Montreal, Quebec, Canada. She was on a voyage from Quebec City to Montreal. She was refloated on 24 May and resumed her voyage. |
| Galathea | Norway | The ship was driven ashore 20 nautical miles (37 km) west of Oran, Algeria. She was a total loss. |
| Gheorghios | Flag unknown | The ship was wrecked on "Gaska Island", in the Black Sea. |
| Governor | United Kingdom | The steamship was damaged by a quayside fire at New Orleans, Louisiana, United States. |
| Greyhound | United Kingdom | The schooner collided with the steamship Prometheus (United Kingdom) off Dover, Kent. Greyhound was on a voyage from the Rio Grande to Saint Petersburg, Russia. She was towed in to Dover. |
| Hahnemann | Flag unknown | The ship ran aground on the Red Island Reef. She was later refloated and taken in to Quebec City, Canada. |
| Ida | Netherlands | The barque was driven ashore. She was refloated with assistance on 10 May. |
| Iolani | United States | The ship collided with Stelvio (Italy) in Lower New York Bay and was beached. Iolani was on a voyage from New York to the Windward Islands. |
| Johannes Roed | Flag unknown | The ship was abandoned in the Atlantic Ocean. She was on a voyage from Antwerp, Belgium to Pictou, Nova Scotia, Canada. |
| John Hopkins | United States | The steamship was destroyed by fire. |
| John Martin | United Kingdom | The schooner was driven ashore and severely damaged at Two Harbors. |
| Keroula | United Kingdom | The steamship was driven ashore in Catalan Bay. She was on a voyage from Catacolo to London. |
| Knut Alfeson | Flag unknown | The ship collided with the steamship Vertumnus (United Kingdom) off Crook Island. She was on a voyage from the Rio Hache to the English Channel. She put in to Kingston, Jamaica in a severely leaky condition. |
| Kragerø | Denmark | The brig was driven ashore at Ceuta, Spain. Her crew were rescued. |
| Lady Louisa | United Kingdom | The schooner was driven ashore near the Kyleakin Lighthouse, Isle of Skye and sank. |
| Luck's All | United Kingdom | The ketch was driven ashore and wrecked at Killeycove Point, Berwickshire. Her crew were rescued. |
| Luigi | Italy | The barque was driven ashore and wrecked at Ceuta. Her crew were rescued. |
| Martha | United Kingdom | The schooner ran aground on the Goodwin Sands, Kent. She was on a voyage from Llanelly, Glamorgan to Hull, Yorkshire. |
| Meraggio | United Kingdom | The steamship was driven ashore on Öland, Sweden. |
| Mozart | United Kingdom | The steamship was wrecked on the Haisborough Sands, in the North Sea off the coast of Norfolk. Her crew were rescued. She was on a voyage from Sunderland, County Durham to Genoa, Italy. |
| Osprey | United Kingdom | The smack collided with a steamship and sank in The River Thames near Gravesend, Kent with the loss of two lives. |
| Otto McCombie | United Kingdom | The steamship ran aground at Barrow-in-Furness, Lancashire. She was on a voyage from Liverpool to Barrow in Furness. |
| Palaeka | flag unknown | The ship was abandoned in the Atlantic Ocean before 24 May. |
| Parthian | United States | The steamship collided with the steamship Dithmarschen (Germany) at Boston, Massachusetts and was severely damaged. |
| Patriot | Norway | The barque was wrecked on the Delaware Breakwater. Her crew were rescued. She was on a voyage from Barbados to an American port. |
| Perseverance | United Kingdom | The steamship collided with the steamship Vesta (Russia) in the River Tyne and was severely damaged. |
| Port Philip | United Kingdom | The steamship ran aground on the Meinderts Droogte, off Java, Netherlands East Indies. She was on a voyage from Passaroeang, Netherlands East Indies to Port Said, Egypt. |
| Robert | Austria-Hungary | The brig was driven ashore at Ceuta. Her crew were rescued. She was on a voyage from Buenos Aires, Argentina to Marseille, Bouches-du-Rhône, France. She was refloated. |
| Royal Dane | United Kingdom | The steamship was driven ashore at "Schardynkil", Zeeland, Netherlands. She was on a voyage from Antwerp, Belgium to Newcastle upon Tyne, Northumberland. |
| Royal Visitor | Norway | The barque was driven ashore at Key West, Florida, United States. She was later refloated with the assistance of a tug and towed in to Key West in a severely leaky condition. |
| Samuel Tyzack | United Kingdom | The steamship caught fire at Buenos Aires, Argentina. |
| Sea Fox | United Kingdom | The barque was severely damaged by an explosion of gunpowder at Equimina, Portuguese West Africa with the loss of five lives. |
| Senta | Germany | The ship ran aground in the Süderelbe. She was on a voyage from Iquique, Chile to Hamburg. |
| Sevilla | Flag unknown | The steamship struck a sunken rock and foundered 4 nautical miles (7.4 km) west of "Glass Island". Her crew survived. |
| Sevilla | Spain | The steamship was wrecked at Ceuta. Her crew were rescued. |
| St. Pierre | France | The brig collided with the steamship Drewton (United Kingdom) and sank in the Mediterranean Sea off the Spanish coast. |
| Teignmouth | United Kingdom | The steamship collided with the steamship Milo (United Kingdom) in the English Channel off Folkestone, Kent and was damaged. She was towed in to Dover. |
| Tjalf | Norway | The brig was damaged by ice near Iggesund, Sweden and sank near "Stumpen". Her crew were rescued. She was on a voyage from Cork, United Kingdom to Hudiksvall, Sweden. |
| Tregenna | United Kingdom | The steamship ran aground at Galata Point, Ottoman Empire. She was on a voyage from Izmail, Russia to Gibraltar. |
| Union | Germany | The full-rigged ship ran aground in the Elbe at Schulau. She was on a voyage from Baltimore, Maryland, United States to Hamburg. |
| Wakefield | United Kingdom | The ship was driven ashore. She was refloated and taken in to Singapore, Straits Settlements. |
| Walter Thomas | United Kingdom | The steamship was driven ashore at Pará, Brazil. She was on a voyage from the Black Sea to Pará. |
