= Sunda Kelapa Lighthouse =

Lighthouse in Indonesia

Coordinates: 6.105155°S 106.805392°E

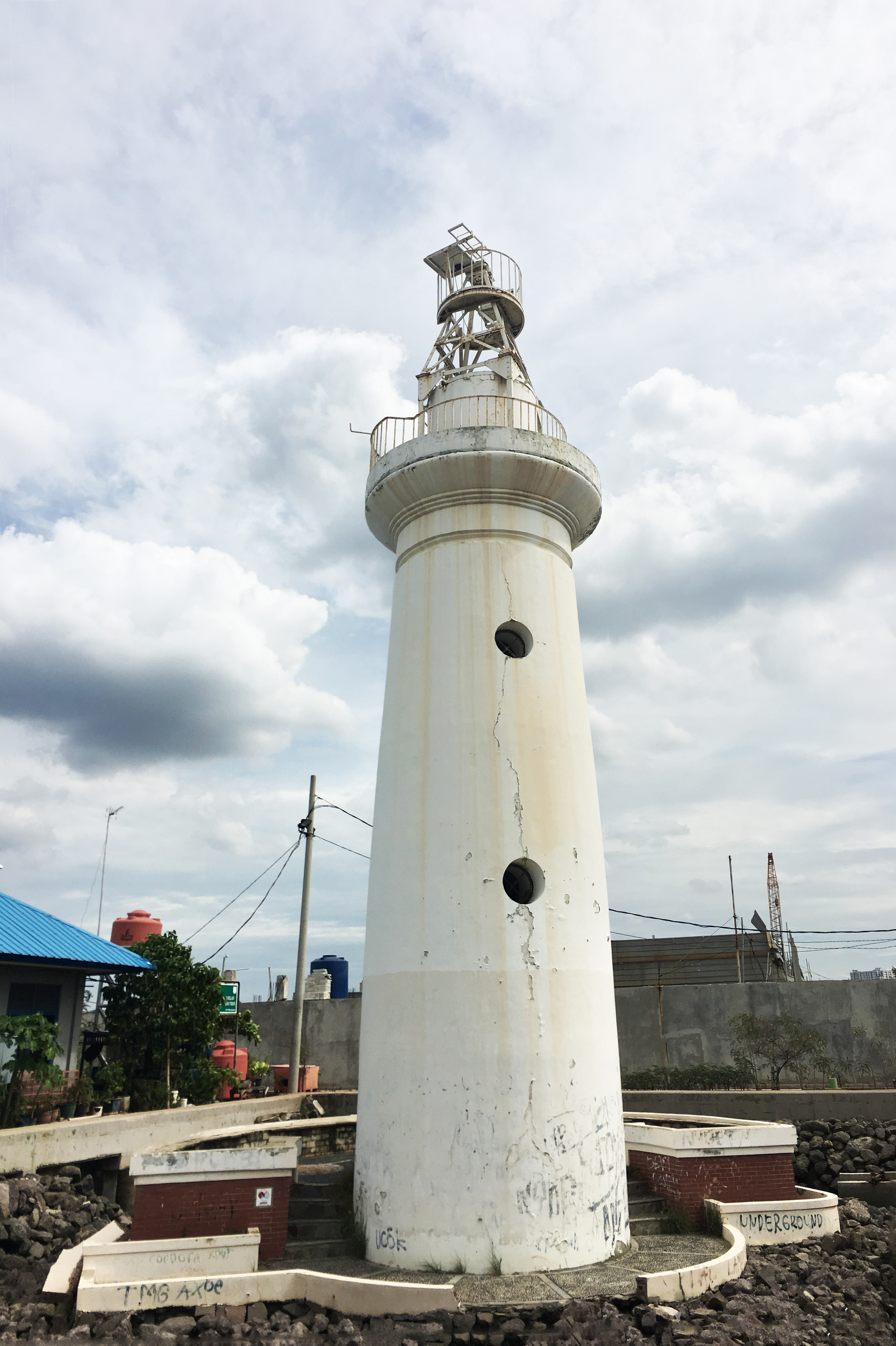
Sunda Kelapa Lighthouse, located at the former west mole of the old port of Batavia.

Sunda Kelapa Lighthouse (Indonesian: Mercusuar Sunda Kelapa) is a lighthouse located in Jakarta, Indonesia. Established in the mid-19th-century, it is among the oldest modern lighthouses in Indonesia.

== History ==
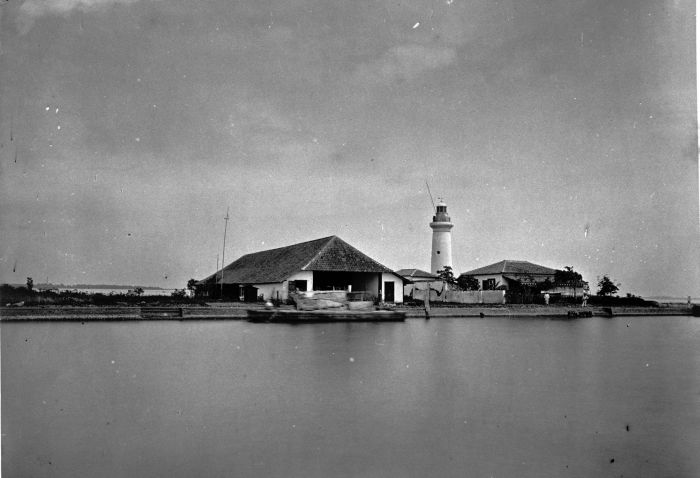
The lighthouse in the 19th century

In the middle of the 19th-century, the area where Sunda Kelapa Lighthouse today lies, was a shallow sea to the north of Batavia. In 1860, the construction of the mole was completed. The west-side mole served as a jetty, which guided ships while entering the harbor of Batavia. In 1862, the Batavia lighthouse was constructed over the western mole. The main function of the lighthouse was to replace the earlier lighthouse, the Menara Syahbandar which is located further inland, directly at the mouth of the Ciliwung or Kali Besar. At the time of its completion, the Sunda Kelapa Lighthouse was the northernmost point of Batavia, strategically located about 2.5 kilometres (1.6 miles) north of the Sunda Kelapa port. Several auxiliary buildings, such as the guardhouse of the lighthouse keeper, were built around the lighthouse. Today, these auxiliary buildings have been demolished.

The lighthouse was used until the 1990s. Recently, the lighthouse was restored. With the redevelopment of the modern Muara Baru fish harbor, the lighthouse is partly hidden by a number of new office buildings and the tall seawall. The ground surrounding the tower has been levelled higher, so the tower currently sits lower than the rest of the ground.

== Building ==
The lighthouse building is currently located at the fish harbor complex of Muara Baru, North Jakarta. It is a relatively small-sized lighthouse. The building is a 16 metres (52 ft) round stone tower, painted white. The original lighthouse has three windows, however, now there are only two windows left. The lighthouse has a focal plane of 17 metres (56 ft) with red flash every 3 seconds. At the floor of the lighthouse is a stone with Chinese writing, indicating the absolute zero longitude of Batavia. This zero longitude was used to map the entire area of the Dutch East Indies. The lighthouse also keeps an antique chronometer.

== See also ==
- List of colonial buildings and structures in Jakarta
- List of lighthouses in Indonesia

== Cited works ==
- Rowlett, Russ (April 13, 2006). "Lighthouses of Indonesia: Java". The Lighthouse Directory. University of North Carolina at Chapel Hill.
- Saiful Rijal Yunus (December 2, 2016). "Menara Tenggelam di Kota yang Tumbuh" [Sinking Tower in a Growing City]. Kompas (in Indonesian). Jakarta. Archived from the original on February 21, 2017.
