= Anyar, Serang =

Town in Banten, Indonesia

Coordinates: 6°04′S 105°53′E

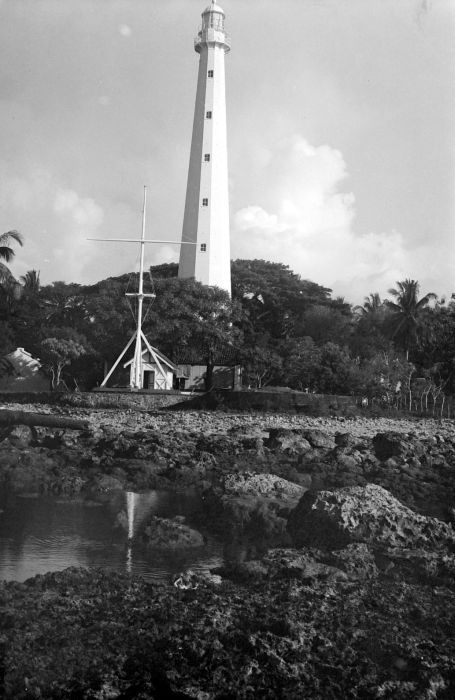
Anyer lighthouse (1933)

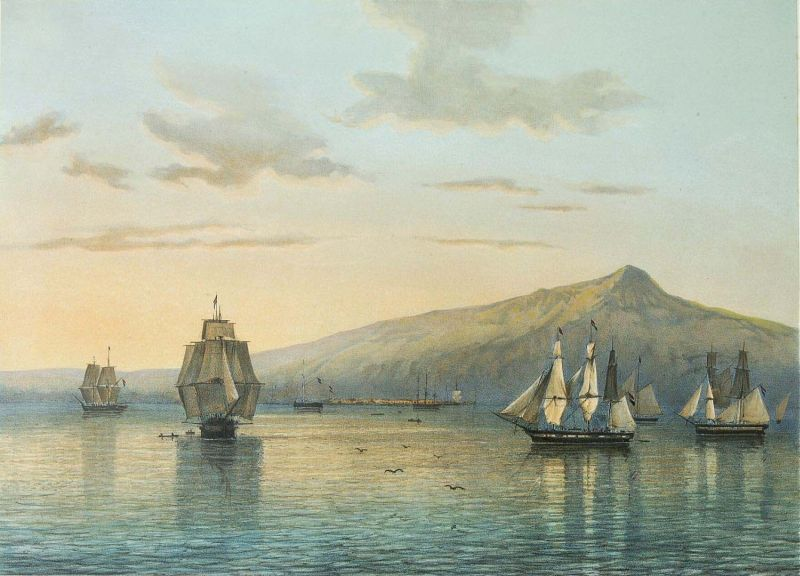
Coast of Java Sea off Anyer.

Anyar, spelling errors and writing as Anyer, old spelling Anjer and also known as Angier, is a coastal town in Banten, formerly West Java, Indonesia, 82 miles (100 km) west of Jakarta and 15 kilometers (9 mi) south of Merak. A significant coastal town late 18th century, Anyer faces the Sunda Strait.

== History ==
The town was a considerable port in the 19th century but was destroyed by a 100-foot-high tsunami which was caused by the 1883 eruption of Krakatoa. The present settlement still houses the Cikoneng Lighthouse built by the Dutch government two years later as a memorial for the townspeople killed by the eruption. It was also the starting point of the Great Post Road, built by the Dutch in the nineteenth century, which ran around 1,000 kilometers (620 mi) to the eastern tip of Java. Off the coast of Anyer is the island Pulau Sangiang, an uninhabited island with vast areas of untouched jungle. The area is also known for coral formations swarming with tropical fish.

Anyer Beach is a tourist attraction with hot swimming water, a hotel, and rental of resting sheds, boats, four-wheeled motorcycles, water scooters, and a banana boat.

Plans around 2011 proposed that the Sunda Strait Bridge, an ambitious megaproject scheduled to start in 2014, would stretch from Anyer across the Sunda Strait to Lampung in South Sumatra.
