= Bon Irau =

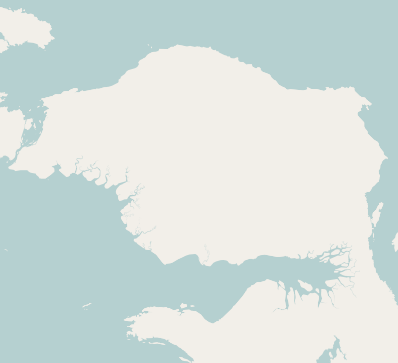
- Location within Bird's Head Peninsula Location within Indonesia

Highest point
- Elevation: 2,501 m (8,205 ft)
- Listing: Ultra; Ribu
- Coordinates: 0°39′43″S 132°53′21″E

Geography
- Location: Bird's Head Peninsula; Arfak Mountains Regency; Manokwari Regency; West Papua; Indonesia
- Parent range: Tamrau Mountains

Bon Irau, with an elevation of 2,501 metres (8,205 ft), is the highest peak in the Tamrau Mountains and the highest point in the province of Southwest Papua outside of the Arfak Mountains. It is located in the north central region of the Bird's Head Peninsula and located around 20 kilometres (12 mi) from the grassy Kebar Valley.

== See also ==
- List of ultras of the Malay Archipelago
