= USS S-38 =

Submarine of the United States

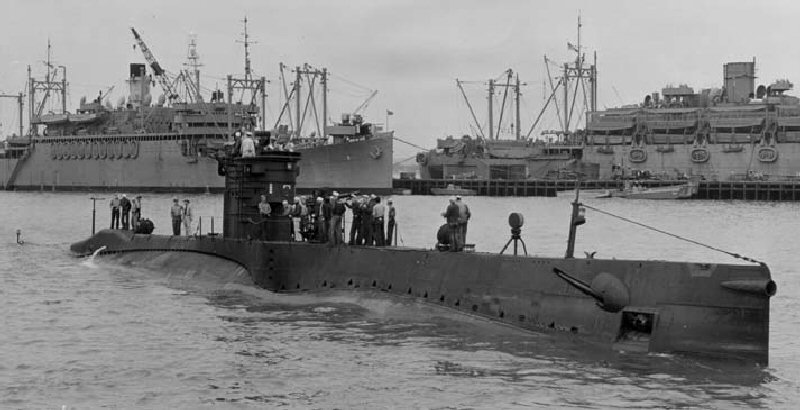
- USS S-38 at San Diego, California, in April 1943 following overhaul.

History

United States
- Name: USS S-38
- Builder: Union Iron Works
- Laid down: 15 January 1919
- Launched: 17 June 1919
- Sponsored by: Mrs. Grace M. Collins
- Commissioned: 11 May 1923
- Decommissioned: 14 December 1944
- Stricken: 20 January 1945
- Fate: Sunk as target 20 February 1945

General characteristics
- Class & type: S-class submarine
- Displacement: 854 long tons (868 t) surfaced; 1,062 long tons (1,079 t) submerged
- Length: 211 ft (64 m) w/l; 219 ft 3 in (66.83 m) o/a
- Beam: 20 ft 9 in (6.32 m)
- Draft: 16 ft (4.9 m)
- Propulsion: NLSE diesels, 1,200 hp (895 kW); General Electric motors, 1,500 hp (1,119 kW); 120-cell Exide battery; 2 shafts; 168 tons oil fuel
- Speed: 14.5 knots (16.7 mph; 26.9 km/h) surfaced; 11 knots (13 mph; 20 km/h) submerged
- Complement: 42 officers and men
- Armament: 1 × 4 in (102 mm)/50 deck gun; 4 × 21 inch (533 mm) torpedo tubes; 12 torpedoes

Service record
- Operations: World War II
- Victories: Hayo Maru, 5,445 GRT, 22 December 1941; Meiyo Maru, 5,628 GRT, 8 August 1942
- Awards: 3 battle stars

USS S-38 (SS-143) was an S-class submarine of the United States Navy.

== Construction and commissioning ==
S-38′s keel was laid down on 15 January 1919 by the Union Iron Works in San Francisco, California. She was launched on 17 June 1919, sponsored by Mrs. Grace M. Collins, and commissioned on 11 May 1923.

== Service history ==
Fitted out at Mare Island, S-38 joined Submarine Division 17 (SubDiv 17) at San Pedro, California, on 24 May and immediately began preparations for a cruise to the Aleutian Islands. On 9 June, she moved north with submarine tenders Beaver, Ortolan, and three other S-boats. On 21 June, they reached Dutch Harbor, whence the boats conducted evaluation tests and exercises for the next three and a half weeks. On 16 July, the force put into Anchorage, Alaska.

On 17 July, while performing routine maintenance on S-38's motors, a crewman removed a valve cover, creating an opening to sea below the boat's waterline, flooding the motor room. The submarine was alongside her tender, USS Ortolan, and no personnel were injured. She was easily raised, but the motors were crippled. Temporary repairs took until 23 July, when the boat was taken in tow by Ortolan.

=== Asiatic Fleet ===
S-38 reached Mare Island on 1 August, remained there for repairs and alterations until April 1924, then returned to San Pedro, whence she conducted local exercises into the summer. In August, she prepared for duty with the Asiatic Fleet, and, in mid-September she headed west across the Pacific. She stood into Manila Bay on 4 November 1924 and, for the next 17 years, operated out of Cavite, with annual summer deployments to the China coast. Division operations occupied Asiatic Fleet submarines during most of the period; but, as civil war intensified on the mainland, submarine schedules became more varied. Annual deployments and regular exercises of the boats as a division were shortened in length, while exercises and patrols of individual boats were increased in number, duration, and range. During these operations, the submarines cruised off the Philippines, along the Indo-China coast, and into the Netherlands East Indies.

=== World War II ===
In June 1940, S-38 completed her last cruise to China; and, from then into the fall of 1941, she conducted exercises, including joint Army-Navy war games, and practice war patrols in the waters off Luzon and neighboring islands. On 8 December 1941 (7 December east of the International Date Line), the attack on Pearl Harbor brought the United States into World War II, and S-38 departed Manila Bay on her first war patrol.

==== 1941 ====
Initially assigned to patrol in Verde Island Passage, she shifted to the west coast of Mindoro on 9 December. On 11 December, S-38 mistakenly torpedoed and sank Norwegian freighter Hydra II west of Mindoro's Cape Calavite. On 12 December, she moved into the Cape Calavite area and, on the night of 19/20 December, set a course toward the Luzon coast. The following night, she put into Camens Cove; repaired damage caused by an explosion of pressure built up in the port engine lube oil cooler; and, with dawn on 21 December, resumed her patrol.

Receiving orders to penetrate shallow, hazard-filled Lingayen Gulf and attack hostile shipping, she entered the gulf just before dawn on 22 December. At 06:45, she sighted an enemy convoy of four transports, escorted by two destroyers. Waiting for the range to drop to a very short 1,000 yards (910 m), at 07:10, she fired four bow tubes — all misses. As she reloaded, the enemy destroyers closed in, pinging, but no depth charges came. At 07:58, she launched two torpedoes at an anchored enemy cargo ship. Less than a minute later, the 5,445 GRT Hayo Maru blew up. Enemy destroyers again closed the submarine, and she went "deep", to 80 ft (24 m), and lay doggo as depth charges rained, none close. From 08:04 to 09:30, the S-boat ran silent, using evasive tactics. At 09:30, she grounded on the muddy bottom; she remained there most of the day, destroyers, joined by small boats, continuing to search, without success. At 21:30, the hunted submarine began efforts to clear by backing. During the maneuvering, her port propeller was damaged; but, by 22:01, she was free and underway for the Hundred Islands area on the western side of the gulf. S-38 surfaced to change the air and charge batteries, then dove at dawn, remaining on the bottom all the next day, giving her crew a rest.

S-38 remained undetected through 23 December; on 24 December, she moved to the southern section of the gulf where she closed a formation of six large auxiliaries just prior to 11:30. At 11:52, there was a huge explosion on her port side, evidently a patrol plane's bomb. She went deeper. Between 12:06 and 12:08, eight more exploded around her. At 12:09, she stopped all motors and sank to the bottom in 180 feet of water. The depth charging continued, but the explosions were more distant. At 12:30, the submarine began to move again. At 12:45, the enemy hunters again located her and resumed depth charging. S-38 again settled to the bottom. The depth charging continued until after 13:00. The search continued until after 18:00.

At 18:42, the submarine got underway, heading back to the Hundred Islands area. At 22:35, she surfaced to recharge her batteries. Five minutes later, her improperly-vented after battery exploded. At 23:04, she went ahead on her starboard engine, making her way out of Lingayen Gulf.

Soon after 02:00 on 25 December, she sighted two enemy destroyers, but remained undetected. At 03:46, however, she sighted a third, which sighted her. S-38 submerged. The destroyer closed the submarine's last surface position and, at 03:50, commenced depth charging. From then until after 09:00, the submarine evaded the destroyer, using her one quiet propeller. She then grounded on a steep bank at 85 feet (26 m). For the next two hours, the destroyer circled. S-38 slid down to 200 feet (60 m), used her motor to bring herself up, then repeated the maneuver. The destroyer moved off and, at 12:35, the S-boat got underway for Manila. An hour later, she grounded, but only briefly; and, at 21:45 on 26 December she entered the outer minefield at the entrance to Manila Bay.

==== 1942 ====
Cavite had now become untenable, and S-38 was ordered to Soerabaja and after repairs S-38 was to operate with other Allied forces attempting to stem the Japanese thrust into the East Indies. On 14 January 1942, the submarine arrived at the Dutch base on the north coast of Java. On 15 January, the ABDA Command was officially established. On 24 January, the Japanese reached Balikpapan. On 25 January, S-38, hurriedly repaired, departed Soerabaja to patrol in Makassar Strait off Balikpapan.

During the next two weeks, S-38 underwent two severe depth charge attacks. On 7 February, she penetrated close to Balikpapan to examine shipping in the harbor, activity along the coast road, and new defenses in the area. On 8 February, she resumed offensive operations, but poor weather hindered success. On 9 February, the Japanese moved on Makassar City, and S-38 was ordered to patrol off Cape William on the Celebes side of the strait, where she remained until 12 February.

Then ordered back to Soerabaja the submarine arrived at her Javanese base on 16 February. Six days later, she again put to sea. Moving east, she patrolled initially off Meinderts Reef, off the northeast coast of Java; then headed north to round the eastern end of Madoera Island en route to Bawean Island. On 26 February, she shelled Japanese facilities at Sangkapura; then patrolled between Bawean and the western approach to Soerabaja. On 28 February, she picked up 58 survivors from destroyer HMS Electra, sunk the day before at the Battle of the Java Sea; and, on 1 March, transferred the British sailors to a surface ship in Madoera Strait. She then resumed her hunt for Japanese shipping which had put the enemy ashore at Batavia, Indramajoe, and Rembang, the latter the last large oil center in the Netherlands East Indies and only 110 mi (180 km) from Soerabaja.

On the morning of 2 March, S-38 fired four torpedoes at a Japanese light cruiser and two at a destroyer, believing he damaged the cruiser, perhaps sank it. In fact, the torpedoes had missed light cruiser Kinu. S-38 then waited on the bottom as destroyers searched for her. In mid-afternoon, she moved out of the immediate area. That evening, she unsuccessfully attacked another enemy warship and, although damaged, survived another hunt by hiding beneath a halocline. On 3 March, she was ordered to western Australia.

S-38 transited the whirlpool and rapids area at the lower end of Lombok Strait on 5 March. On 13 March she arrived at Fremantle; and, at the end of the month, proceeded to Brisbane to join other Asiatic Fleet S-boats in forming the nucleus of TF 42 and to prepare for operations in the New Guinea-Bismarck Archipelago-Solomon Islands area.

During March and April, enemy air raids against Port Moresby intensified in preparation to move into Papua from northeast New Guinea. On 28 April, S-38 cleared Moreton Bay and headed north to patrol the Papuan coast. In mid-May, she shifted to Jomard Passage, where she remained, unable to communicate with Brisbane, until the night of 18 May. She then set a course for the Queensland coast. On 20 May, she passed debris believed to be a result of the Battle of the Coral Sea, and that night she successfully transmitted a message to Brisbane. On 24 May, she returned to Moreton Bay.

A month-long repair and test period followed during which cells damaged in the battery explosion on her first war patrol were finally replaced. On 24 June, she again stood down the Brisbane River, cleared Moreton Bay, and entered the Coral Sea bound for the Solomons. On 29 June, she entered her assigned patrol area and headed for the passage between the Russell Islands and Guadalcanal. On 30 June, she was standing down Lunga Roads, and, on 1 July, she arrived off Tulagi where she closed her first target of the patrol. Detected as she prepared to fire, she evaded a depth-charging destroyer and gradually gained sea room. The depth charging, however, aggravated problems of old age and corrosion. Depth control became difficult as leaks developed in an auxiliary tank and in the motor room bilges. The leaks in the latter worsened as she moved out of the immediate area and resulted in a stream of air bubbles which led to aerial detection two hours after she had left the destroyer behind. Thereafter, mechanical problems multiplied; and S-38, unable to remain effective on her station, set a course for Brisbane, arriving on 7 July.

For the better part of the next 20 days, S-38 underwent intensive, round-the-clock repairs at the Queensland Government Dry Dock, and, on 28 July, she again headed out across the Coral Sea. On 4 August, she entered her assigned area, New Britain-New Ireland, and commenced patrolling along the Rabaul-New Guinea traffic lanes. By 6 August, she had moved eastward along the New Britain coast, crossed the shipping lanes at the southern entrance to St. George's Channel, and closed the coast of New Ireland. On 7 August, she shifted her search for Japanese shipping further seaward and within hours sighted several targets; but distance, lack of speed and maneuverability, and mechanical breakdowns precluded successful attacks. This was later the main Japanese attack force for the Battle of Savo Island. On 8 August, however, approximately eight miles south of Cape St. George, she sighted a transport escorted by a destroyer and approaching so as to pass close ahead. At 23:09, S-38 rigged for depth charging and prepared to fire. At 23:24, she fired two torpedoes at the transport. Less than a minute later, both exploded on target. The 5,628 GRT Meiyo Maru went dead in the water. S-38 commenced evasive tactics. At 23:30, the destroyer dropped its first depth charge. At 23:32, Meiyo Maru began breaking up (the second of just two ships confirmed sunk by S-38) and, at 23:39, S-38 headed south.

The sunken transport's escort continued searching but, by 01:45 on 9 August, S-38 had moved out of the area and all sounds of the search had faded behind her. On the night of 9/10 August, the S-boat returned to the traffic lanes eight miles (15 km) off the southwest coast of New Ireland, where she continued her hunting until 12 August. She then moved westward returning to the southeastern coast of New Britain to attempt to intercept traffic between Rabaul and New Guinea. On 15 August, she headed for Australia and reached Brisbane a week later.

Fleet submarines were now ranging the Pacific, and the S-boats were being ordered back to the United States for modernization overhauls. On 21 September, S-38, carrying only four torpedoes to avoid depleting the supply at Brisbane, departed Australia for the United States. Ordered to reconnoiter several of the Gilbert Islands en route, she fueled and took on lube oil and provisions at Nouméa on 25 and 26 September, then moved toward the Gilberts. On 30 September, she altered her course and headed for Anuda in the Santa Cruz Islands where she transferred an acute appendicitis case to a Navy PBY Catalina on 1 October; then resumed her original mission. On 5 October, she was in the Gilberts and two days later was off Tarawa where she attempted to sink a tanker as it emerged from the lagoon. The "fish", however, exploded on the reef and S-38 was forced to clear the area as the Japanese sent both aerial and surface antisubmarine forces into the action. By midnight, the submarine was patrolling the Makin-Tarawa traffic lane, and, on 10 October, she completed her reconnaissance mission at Makin and headed for Pearl Harbor.

==== 1943–1944 ====
From Hawaii, S-38 went to San Diego, California, arriving on 6 November. Overhaul followed. Her engines, motors, and all auxiliary equipment were removed and completely overhauled; the superstructure was modified to reduce her silhouette, air conditioning and new radar, sound, and radio equipment were installed, and a four-inch (102 mm)/fifty caliber gun replaced her three-inch. On 13 April 1943, she completed overhaul; and, on 15 April, she sailed west.

The next day, S-38 began suffering mechanical breakdowns again, and, on 29 April, she arrived at Pearl Harbor. Repairs took her into June. Tests followed and, on 26 June, she again moved west to the Marshall Islands where she conducted her last war patrol which, although scoreless and plagued by mechanical failures, was successful in gaining photographs of Japanese activity on future target islands.

On 22 July, S-38 set a course for the New Hebrides; and, on 27 July, she arrived at Espiritu Santo to commence antisubmarine warfare training duties. With only two interruptions, she remained in the New Hebrides-New Caledonia area on that duty into the summer of 1944. At 10:17 on 16 August 1944, a U.S. Navy TBM Avenger torpedo bomber from the escort carrier USS White Plains (CVE-66) mistook S-38 for a Japanese submarine about 12 nautical miles (22 km; 14 mi) ahead of the White Plains task unit while S-38 was conducting antisubmarine warfare exercises near Espiritu Santo with two SBD Dauntless dive bombers and the yard patrol boat USS YP-414. The TBM dropped two 300-pound (136 kg) depth charges as S-38 crash-dived. The first depth charge detonated close aboard as S-38 passed 38 feet (12 m), causing S-38 to lose all power temporarily. S-38 claimed that the second exploded as she resurfaced, while the TBM pilot reported that it did not detonate.

On 27 August 1944, S-38 departed Espiritu Santo for California; and, on 7 September, she arrived at San Diego. The following month, she was ordered inactivated.

== Fate ==
S-38 was decommissioned on 14 December 1944, struck from the Naval Vessel Register on 20 January 1945, and expended as a target by aerial bombing on 20 February 1945.

== Awards ==
- Yangtze Service Medal
- China Service Medal
- American Defense Service Medal
- Asiatic-Pacific Campaign Medal with three battle stars
- World War II Victory Medal
- Philippine Presidential Unit Citation
- Philippine Defense Medal with star

== In popular culture ==
The S-38 is the subject of an episode of the syndicated television anthology series, The Silent Service, which aired in the United States during the 1957–1958 season.
