= Karang Mas =

Coordinates: 7°39′S 114°27′E

Karang Mas or Karang Mas Shoal (Gosong Karang Mas) is a reef located off the northeastern tip of the island of Java, about 15 km offshore at the southern entrance to Madura Strait. The reef was known as Meinderts Reef (Dutch Meyndertsdroogte).

It carried a lighthouse (07° 39' S 114° 27' E) which had existed in the 1930s and was used as a significant navigation aid and landmark, but was evidently destroyed during World War II. The former lighthouse has been replaced with a newer lighthouse which apparently constructed above the base of the original lighthouse.

== World War II ==
During World War II, in February, 1942, when Rear Admiral W. F. M. Doorman, Koninklijke Marine, assembled the first Allied Combined Striking Force under ABDAFLOAT, Admiral T. C. Hart, U. S. Navy, his Combined Striking Force Operation Order No. 1 of 3 February 1942 directed the Dutch and American warships to assemble at dawn five miles north of the Meyndertsdroogte Light in Madura Straits. It was mentioned in several U. S. Navy reports of the same event which renders the name as Meinderts Reef.

== See also ==
- American-British-Dutch-Australian Command
- List of lighthouses in Indonesia
- USS S-38 (SS-143)
