= Tamrau Mountains =

Mountain range in Indonesia

Coordinates: 0°38′36″S 132°35′17″E

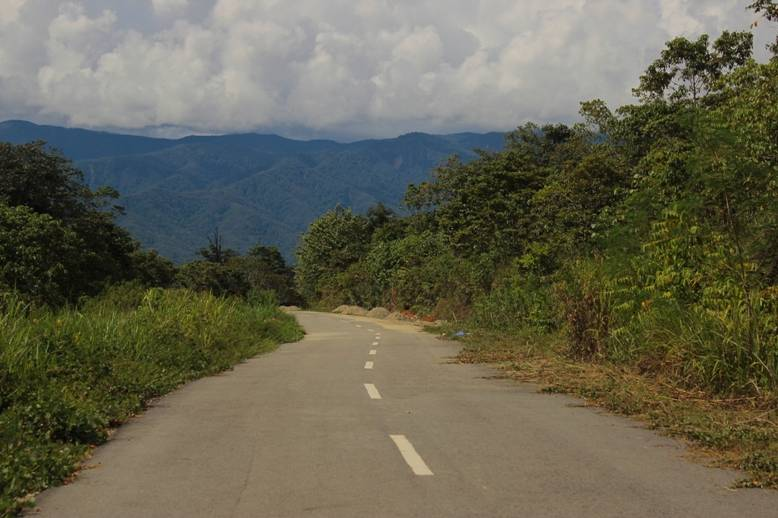
- View of the Tamrau Mountains from a highway in the Kebar Valley.

Highest point
- Peak: Bon Irau
- Elevation: 2,501 m (8,205 ft)

Geography
- Location: Manokwari Regency, Sorong Regency, Tambrauw Regency, Arfak Mountains Regency, West Papua
- Country: Indonesia

Geology
- Orogenies: Mesozoic and Paleozoic
- Rock types: sandstone, igneous and limestone

The Tamrau Mountains, also known as the Tambrauw Mountains or the Tamarau Mountains, is a mountain range located in the north-central region of the Bird's Head Peninsula in the province of West Papua, Indonesia. It is made up of an isolated and lesser continuous mountain chain compared to the Arfak Mountains. The Tamrau and Arfak Mountains are both divided by the grassy Kebar Valley, which is the heartland of many indigenous people, with a variety of backgrounds. The Tamrau Mountains have been scantily surveyed. The mountains are an important and threatened site of biodiversity, part of the Vogelkop montane rain forests ecoregion.
