= HMAS Hawkesbury (K363) =

1943 River-class frigate

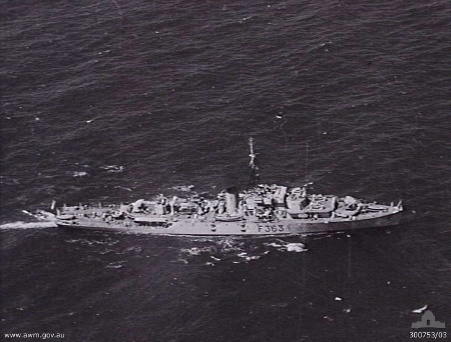
- HMAS Hawkesbury in 1954

History

Australia
- Name: Hawkesbury
- Namesake: Hawkesbury River
- Builder: Mort's Dock & Engineering Company, Sydney
- Laid down: 24 August 1942
- Launched: 24 July 1943
- Commissioned: 5 July 1944
- Decommissioned: 31 May 1947
- Recommissioned: 14 May 1952
- Decommissioned: 14 February 1955
- Honours and awards: Battle honours: Pacific 1944–45; New Guinea 1944; Borneo 1945
- Fate: Scrapped in 1961
- Badge

General characteristics
- Class & type: River-class frigate
- Displacement: 1,489 tons standard; 2,120 tons full load
- Length: 283 ft (86.26 m) p/p; 301.25 ft (91.82 m)o/a
- Beam: 36.5 ft (11.13 m)
- Draught: 9 ft (2.74 m); 13 ft (3.96 m) (deep load)
- Propulsion: 2 × Admiralty 3-drum boilers, 2 shafts, reciprocating vertical triple expansion, 5,500 ihp (4,100 kW)
- Speed: 20 knots (37 km/h; 23 mph)
- Range: 500 long tons (510 t; 560 short tons) oil fuel; 5,180 nautical miles (9,590 km; 5,960 mi) at 12 knots (22 km/h; 14 mph)
- Complement: 140
- Armament: 2 × QF 4 in (102 mm) /45 Mk.XVI, single mounts HA/LA Mk.XX; 3 × QF 40 mm Bofors, single mounts Mk.VII; 1 × Hedgehog 24 spigot A/S projector; 2 × Squid triple barrelled anti-submarine mortars; Depth charge Throwers

HMAS Hawkesbury (K363/F363) was a River-class frigate of the Royal Australian Navy (RAN). Hawkesbury saw action during World War II. She entered service with the RAN in mid-1944 and was decommissioned in 1955.

== Construction ==
Hawkesbury was laid down by Mort's Dock & Engineering Company at Sydney on 24 August 1942, launched on 24 July 1943, and commissioned on 5 July 1944.

== Operational history ==
=== World War II ===
After conducting trials off the Australian east coast she proceeded to New Guinea to undertake convoy escort duties. She escorted convoys in the South West Pacific Area until December when she returned to Brisbane.

Hawkesbury began her second operational deployment in January 1945, and conducted escort duties in New Guinea and Philippine waters until mid-April. On 27 April, she formed part of the escort for the convoy that landed Australian troops at Tarakan on 1 May. Hawkesbury provided fire support for the landing force until 7 May. After another period of escort duties, Hawkesbury took part in the Australian Brunei Bay landings in Borneo in June. In July she spent a period collecting intelligence in the Maluku Islands and established lighthouses with HMAS Cape Leeuwin to open a route between Darwin and Morotai. She returned to Sydney in July for a short refit.

The frigate received three battle honours for her wartime service: "Pacific 1944–45", "New Guinea 1944", and "Borneo 1945".

=== Post-war ===
Following the surrender of Japan, Hawkesbury escorted the repatriation transport Duntroon to Singapore in August. After escorting the transport to Darwin she took part in the Japanese surrender ceremony at Koepang, Timor on 3 October. Hawkesbury operated in the eastern Netherlands East Indies until mid-November when she returned to Sydney. She received a four-month refit in Melbourne and operated off the Australian east coast until 31 May 1947, when she paid off to reserve.

After five years in reserve, Hawkesbury was recommissioned on 14 May 1952. From late July she conducted operations in support of the British atomic bomb test in the Montebello Islands off Western Australia. She returned to Sydney in January 1953. For the next two years she undertook routine patrols and training exercises off the Australian and New Guinean coasts, completing two patrols of Australian waters in the South-West Pacific area.

== Fate ==
HMAS Hawkesbury was paid off to reserve for a second time on 14 February 1955. She was declared for disposal in early 1961 without having been recommissioned, and was sold for scrapping in September 1961.
