= Kebar Valley =

- Lembah Kebar
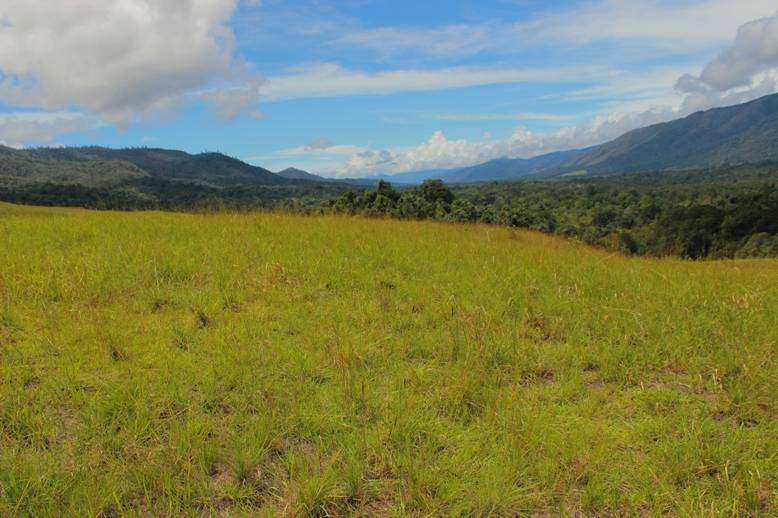
- A tall grass field, with a large broadleaf forest in the background.

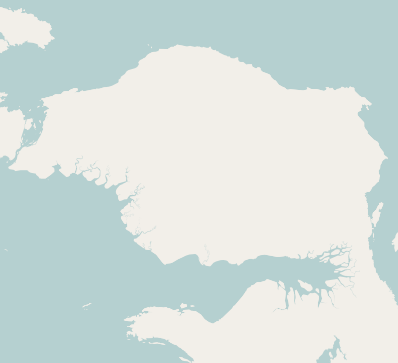
- Location within Bird's Head Peninsula Location within Indonesia
- Length: 94 to 116 km (58 to 72 mi)
- Width: 16 to 30 km (9.9 to 18.6 mi)
- Area: 2,703 km^{2} (1,044 mi^{2})
- Depth: 500 to 1,400 m (1,600 to 4,600 ft)

Geology
- Type: Alluvial

Geography
- Location: Manokwari Regency, Arfak Mountains Regency, Tambrauw Regency, West Papua, Bird's Head Peninsula, Indonesia
- Population centers: Many tribal villages of the Karoon, Abun, Dore and Wabia people
- Borders on: Tamrau Mountains (north), Arfak Mountains (south)
- Coordinates: 0°49′22″S 133°01′15″E
- Rivers: Kasi River, Api River, Apriri River
- Interactive map of Kebar Valley

The Kebar Valley (Indonesian: Lembah Kebar) is a large pleistocene/holocene intermontane valley found in the north central region of the Bird's Head Peninsula in the province of Southwest Papua. The valley is enclosed by the fault-bounded Tamrau Mountains at an area of 2,703 square kilometres (1,044 mi^{2}). Its depth averages from 500 to 600 m (1,600 to 2,000 ft) in the lower sections to around 900 to 1,400 m (3,000 to 4,600 ft) in the upper sections of the valley. The valley is located 130 km (81 mi) west of Manokwari and 190 km (120 mi) east of Sorong. The nearest major village to the valley is Saukorem. A notable path runs through the Kebar Valley connecting Saukorem to the settlement of Andai and reaches an altitude of 1,200 m (3,900 ft). This has created many villages throughout the area, leading to a growing rice production in the central and eastern regions of the valley. From north to south, the Kebar Valley ranges from 16 to 30 km (9.9 to 18.6 mi) wide, and from east to west, it extends from 94 to 116 km (58 to 72 mi) in length.

== Geography ==
The valley floor is leveled and gently tilted to three degrees, providing a division between the Arfak Mountains in the south, and the Tamrau Mountains in the north. Along its margins are several small alluvial cones, and terrace remnants of high level lake or alluvial deposits that rest along the north side of the valley. The major drainage area is the Kasi River. However, the Api River and Apriri River are two other rivers that cross this valley and supply water to the southeast lowland swamp areas. At the western end of the valley, quaternary basin sediments are cut by the Kasi River and exposed in terraces up to 30 m (98 ft) high. Throughout the valley are many natural pastures, with the largest one located in the central region and has an area of 218 km^{2} (84 mi^{2}). Primary fauna found in the valley is the Rusa Deer (Cervus timorensis), which are mostly found close to the flat regions of the central and eastern parts of the valley, encompassing the grassland and forest regions. However, it is common to find the deer across the grassland, looking for shelter in the hilly forests of the western regions of the valley. This hilly grassland area can be described as the pathway of water from highland areas to the flatland areas flowing to the east through the gullies. The physical characteristic of the soil in the Kebar Valley has been described as sandy in texture with little coherence structure in the central and western regions, along with a sandy clay loam in coherent plastic bolus structure along the eastern region.

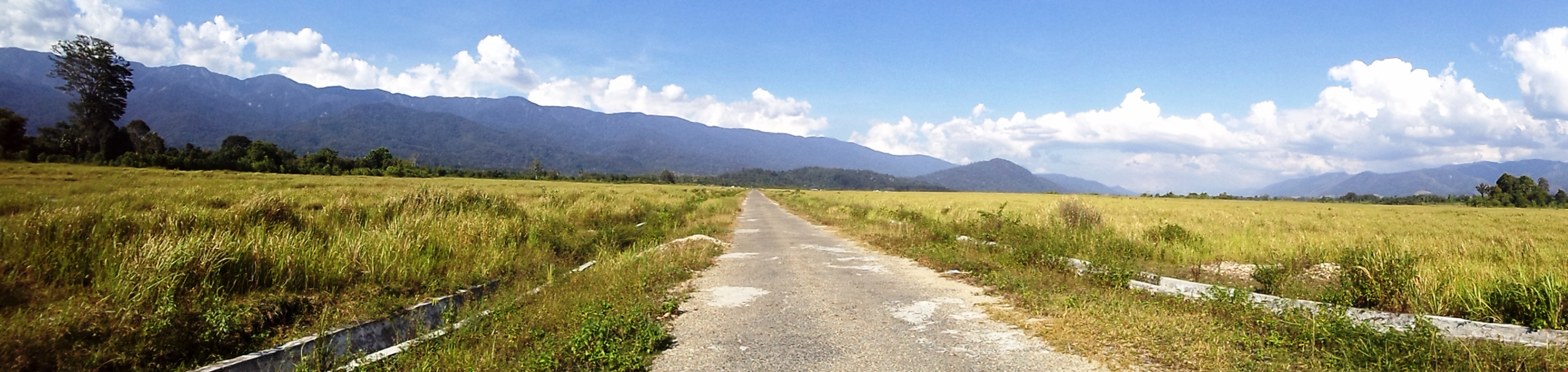
Kebar Valley, with the Tamrau Mountains in the background.

== Climate ==
Encompassing the Vogelkop montane rain forests ecoregion, the Kebar Valley has a tropical savanna climate, characterized mostly by its tall grass fields and broadleaf forests. The weather in the valley is subject to seasonal influence of the northwest monsoon from November to March, and the southeast trade winds from June to September. Limited meteorological observations indicate a relatively dry season for half of the year along the northern and central part of the valley, especially when the trade winds are blowing from the southeast. Rainfall is high throughout the Kebar Valley, with an average up to 3,500 millimetres (140 in) annually. Temperatures are uniformly high in the lowlands, which range from about 23 to 30 °C (73 to 86 °F), decreasing with higher elevation towards the Tamrau Mountains to a mean daily temperature from 8 to 16 °C (46 to 61 °F), with an average rainfall from 1,500 to 2,000 millimetres (59 to 79 in). Relative humidity is also uniformly high in the valley, ranging from 80 to 100 percent. Morning clouds and ground fog may hamper aircraft operations in regions surrounding the valley during dry season.

== Demographics ==
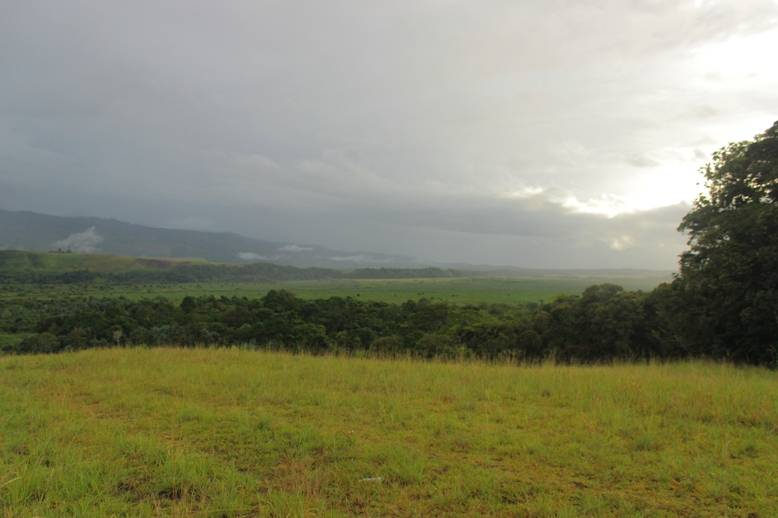
For agricultural purposes, many of the people live in the grassland regions of the Kebar Valley.

The Kebar Valley is home to the Karoon, Abun, Dore and the Wabia people who made their main home in the village of Saukorem. The growing populations in the valley resulted from Christian missionaries that moved through this region of the Bird's Head Peninsula. The people living here are reported to have children not only with partners of other families, but with cousins and distant relatives which may affect the parent's views of which children are truly "biological" or not. The people of the valley, Saukorem and this region of the Bird's Head Peninsula are said to produce wooden figures which are known as Korwar figures. They are often made with glass beads for eyes and a neckband made of bark-cloth and with the skulls of deceased family members. The Korwar figures in particular which are made with skulls are said to provide an abode for spirits of the departed and are believed to safeguard the vital force which is contained within the skull of the deceased. The locals are also known for producing bark-cloth.

== Resources ==
- Grazing habitat of Rusa Deer (Cervus timorensis) in the Kebar Valley. Accessed 5 March 2015
- WWF Bird Watching on Bird's Head, and the Threats to the Region Vogelkop Montane Rain Forests. Accessed 5 March 2015
- Arfak Mountains: Birding Hotspot of West Papua Accessed 5 March 2015
