= HMAS Cape Leeuwin =

Royal Australian Navy ship

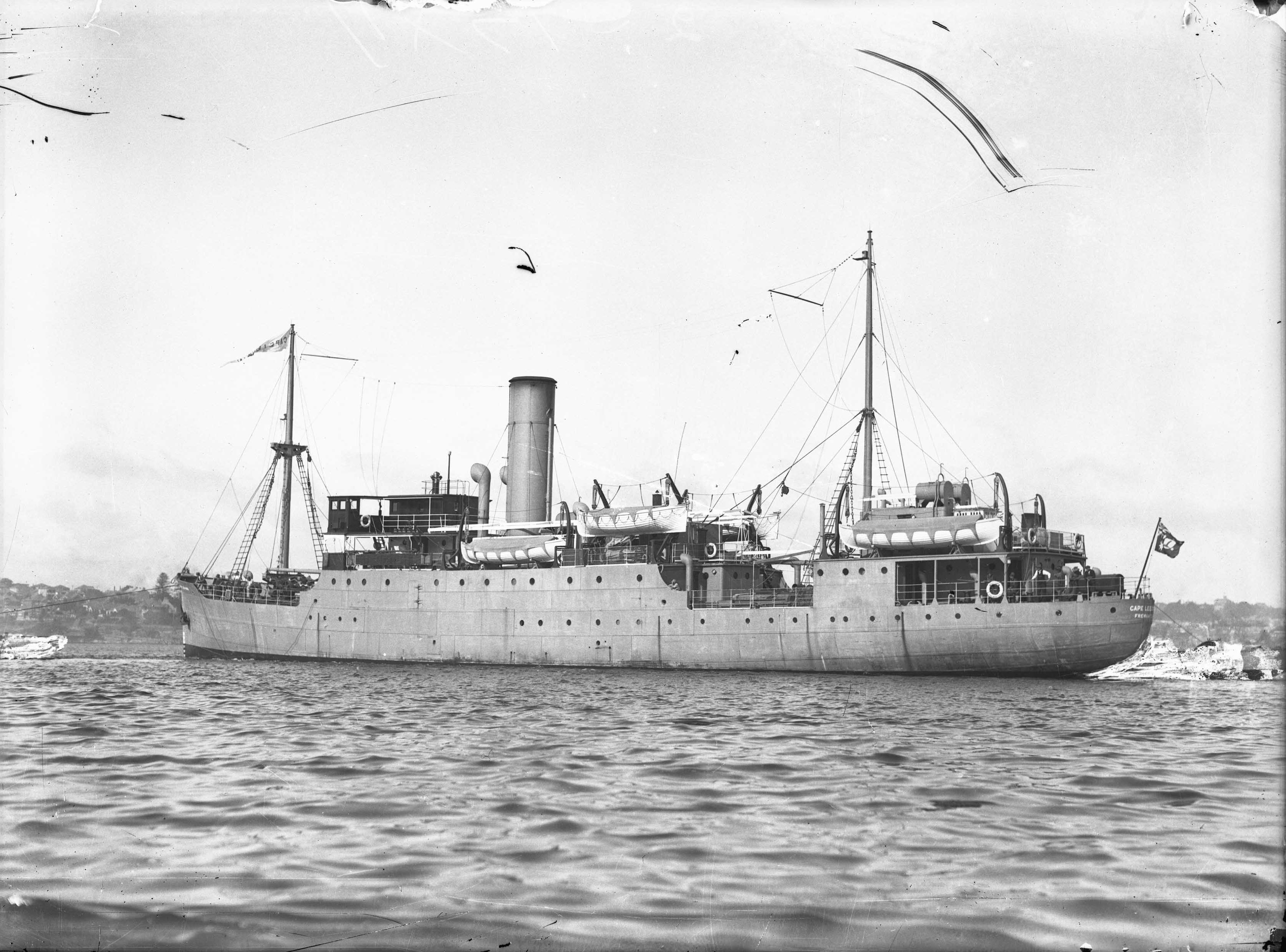
- HMAS Cape Leeuwin

History

Australia
- Namesake: Cape Leeuwin, Western Australia
- Builder: Cockatoo Island Dockyard
- Laid down: 15 July 1924
- Launched: 10 December 1924
- Commissioned: 27 August 1943
- Decommissioned: 12 December 1945
- Fate: Sold 1963, scrapped 1968

General characteristics
- Tonnage: 1406 gross register tons
- Length: 225 ft (69 m)
- Beam: 35 ft (11 m)
- Draught: 20 ft (6.1 m)
- Speed: 10 knots (19 km/h; 12 mph)
- Armament: 1 × QF 12-pounder 12 cwt naval gun; 5 × Oerlikon 20 mm cannon; 2 × Vickers machine gun

HMAS Cape Leeuwin was a lighthouse tender which was commissioned into the Royal Australian Navy (RAN) between mid-1943 and the end of 1945.

== Design ==
The ship displaces 1,406 gross tons, is 225 feet (69 m) in length, with a beam of 35 feet (11 m), and a draught of 20 feet (6.1 m). Top speed was 10 knots (19 km/h; 12 mph). In naval service, the ship was armed with a QF 12-pounder 12 cwt naval gun, supplemented by five Oerlikon 20 mm cannons and two Vickers machine guns.

== Operational history ==
Cape Leeuwin was built in 1924 for the lighthouse service. The ship was laid down at Cockatoo Island Dockyard on 15 July 1924, and launched on 10 December 1924.

She was requisitioned for service with the RAN from the Queensland Department of Commerce in October 1941 and commissioned into the Navy on 27 August 1943. Her peacetime captain, Noel Buxton, stayed with the ship throughout her naval service and received the rank of Lieutenant.

From August 1943, Cape Leeuwin was used to lay buoys and service lights along the coast of Queensland and in the South-West Pacific. She laid buoys and beacons between Milne Bay and Hollandia in New Guinea. From late 1944, she served in the Philippines Campaign, and established navigation aids at Leyte, Mindoro, Subic Bay and Manila. As part of these operations, she was the first Australian ship to enter Manila Bay after the Battle of Manila. In July 1945, she and HMAS Hawkesbury established lighthouses in the Moluccas which reopened a route between Darwin and Morotai.

After the war, Cape Leeuwin was decommissioned from the RAN and returned to her owners on 12 December 1945. She continued in Australian service until 1963 when she was paid off and sold to a company in Asia, which named her Ruby.
