= List of airports in Indonesia =

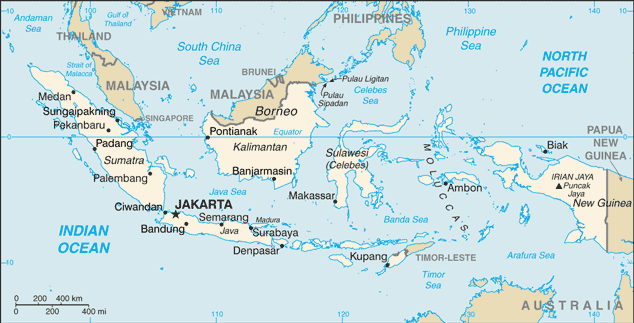
Map of Indonesia

This is a list of airports in Indonesia, sorted by location.

The Republic of Indonesia comprises 17,000 islands in Southeast Asia and Oceania. Indonesia shares land borders with Papua New Guinea, East Timor, and Malaysia. Other neighboring countries include Singapore, Philippines, Australia, and the Indian territory of the Andaman and Nicobar Islands. Indonesia's capital city is Jakarta.

Indonesia had 673 airports in 2013, ranging from grand international airports to modest unpaved airstrips on remote islands or inland interior areas located throughout the archipelago. Most of them are operated by Transportation Ministry technical operation units and state-owned PT Angkasa Pura I & II. Based on the 2009 Aviation Law, the government had to transfer air navigation service management from airport operators to a non-profit institution by January 2012 to improve Air traffic services (ATS).

== Airports ==
=== Civilian or joint civilian-military airports ===
Location served	Province	ICAO	IATA	Airport name	Coordinates	Airport status	Named after	Reference						
Java, Madura and outlying islands
Bawean	East Java	WARW	BXW	Harun Thohir Airport	05°43′25″S 112°40′45″E	Civilian	Harun Thohir, a National Hero of Indonesia, honoured for his role in the MacDonald House bombing in Singapore on 10 March 1965.							
Bandung	West Java	WICC	BDO	Husein Sastranegara Airport	06°54′02″S 107°34′35″E	Civilian / Military	Husein Sastranegara, Indonesian Air Force pioneer							
Bandung	West Java	WICA	KJT	Kertajati International Airport	6°39'06.4"S 108°09'27.6"E	Civilian								
Banyuwangi	East Java	WADY	BWX	Banyuwangi Airport formerly Blimbingsari Airport	08°18′36″S 114°20′25″E	Civilian								
Cepu	Central Java	WARC	CPF	Ngloram Airport	07°11′41″S 111°32′53″E	Civilian								
Cirebon	West Java	WICD	CBN	Cakrabhuwana Airport formerly Penggung Airport	06°45′22.12″S 108°32′22.82″E	Civilian								
Cilacap	Central Java	WAHL	CXP	Tunggul Wulung Airport	07°38′42″S 109°02′03″E	Civilian	Ibrahim Tunggul Wulung, Indonesian evangelist							
Jakarta	Special Capital Region of Jakarta	WIHH	HLP	Halim Perdanakusuma International Airport	06°15′59″S 106°53′28″E	Civilian / Military	Halim Perdanakusuma, Indonesian airman and National Hero of Indonesia							
Jakarta	Banten	WIII	CGK	Soekarno–Hatta International Airport	6°07′32″S 106°39′21″E	Civilian	Sukarno and Mohammad Hatta, founding fathers of Indonesia							
Jember	East Java	WARE	JBB	Notohadinegoro Airport	8°14′28″S 113°41′38″E	Civilian								
Karimunjawa	Central Java	WAHU	KWB	Dewadaru Airport	05°48′04″S 110°28′43″E	Civilian	Dewandaru, a tree endemic to Karimunjawa							
Kediri	East Java	WARD	DHX	Dhoho Airport		Civilian								
Malang	East Java	WARA	MLG	Abdul Rachman Saleh Airport	07°55′42″S 112°42′48″E	Civilian / Military	Abdul Rahman Saleh, physician and aviator							
Pangandaran	West Java	WICN	CJN	Cijulang Nusawiru Airport	07°43′12″S 108°29′19″E	Civilian								
Purbalingga	Central Java	WAHP	PWL	Jenderal Besar Soedirman Airport formerly Wirasaba Airport	07°27′42″S 109°25′00″E	Civilian	Sudirman, former commander in chief of the Indonesian Armed Forces							
Semarang	Central Java	WAHS	SRG	Jenderal Ahmad Yani International Airport	06°58′17″S 110°22′27″E	Civilian / Military	Ahmad Yani, former Commander of the Indonesian Army							
South Tangerang	Banten	WIHP	PCB	Pondok Cabe Airport	6°20′13.05″S 106°45′53.99″E	Civilian / Military								
Sumenep	East Java	WART	SUP	Trunojoyo Airport	07°01′27.3″S 113°53′24.74″E	Civilian	Trunajaya, Madurese nobleman							
Surabaya	East Java	WARR	SUB	Juanda International Airport	07°22′47″S 112°47′13″E	Civilian / Military	Juanda Kartawijaya, politician and former prime minister							
Surakarta	Central Java	WAHQ	SOC	Adisoemarmo International Airport formerly Panasan Airport	07°30′58″S 110°45′25″E	Civilian / Military	Adisoemarmo Wirjokusumo, Indonesian Air Force pioneer							
Tangerang	Banten	WIRR	RTO	Budiarto Airport	6.2903171°S 106.569136°E	Civilian								
Tasikmalaya	West Java	WICM	TSY	Wiriadinata Airport	07°20′47.77″S 108°14′45.93″E	Civilian	Wiriadinata, notable Paskhas commander							
Yogyakarta	Special Region of Yogyakarta	WAHH	JOG	Adisutjipto Airport formerly Maguwo Airport	07°47′17″S 110°25′54″E	Civilian / Military	Agustinus Adisutjipto, Indonesian Air Force officer							
Yogyakarta	Special Region of Yogyakarta	WAHI	YIA	Yogyakarta International Airport	7°54′27″S 110°03′16″E	Civilian								
Sumatra and outlying islands
Banda Aceh	Aceh	WITT	BTJ	Sultan Iskandar Muda International Airport formerly Blangbintang Airport		Civilian / Military	Iskandar Muda, Sultan of Aceh							
Bandar Lampung	Lampung	WILL	TKG	Radin Inten II Airport formerly Branti Airport		Civilian	Radin Inten II, Lampungese nobleman							
Batam	Riau Islands	WIDD	BTH	Hang Nadim International Airport		Civilian	Hang Nadim, Johor-Riau warrior							
Batu Islands	North Sumatra	WIMO	LSE	Lasondre Airport		Civilian								
Bengkulu	Bengkulu	WIGG	BKS	Fatmawati Soekarno Airport formerly Padangkemiling Airport		Civilian	Fatmawati, former First Lady of Indonesia, third wife of the first president of Indonesia, Sukarno							
Blangpidie	Aceh	WITO	KJX	Blangpidie Airport		Civilian								
Dabo	Riau Islands	WIDS	SIQ	Dabo Airport		Civilian								
Dumai	Riau	WIBD	DUM	Pinang Kampai Airport		Civilian								
Enggano	Bengkulu	WIGE	ENG	Enggano Airport		Civilian								
Gunung Sitoli	North Sumatra	WIMB	GNS	Binaka Airport		Civilian								
Jambi	Jambi	WIJJ	DJB	Sultan Thaha Airport formerly Palmerah Airport		Civilian	Thaha Syaifuddin, last Sultan of Jambi							
Jemaja Island	Riau Islands	WIDL	LMU	Letung Airport		Civilian								
Kerinci	Jambi	WIPH	KRC	Depati Parbo Airport		Civilian								
Krui	Lampung	WILP	TFY	Muhammad Taufiq Kiemas Airport		Civilian	Taufiq Kiemas, politician and former speaker of the People's Consultative Assembly							
Kutacane	Aceh	WILD	LSR	Alas Leuser Airport		Civilian								
Lhokseumawe	Aceh	WITM	LSW	Malikus Saleh Airport		Civilian								
Lubuklinggau	South Sumatra	WIPB	LLJ	Silampari Airport		Civilian								
Matak	Riau Islands	WIOM	MWK	Matak Airport		Civilian / Military								
Medan	North Sumatra	WIMM	KNO	Kualanamu International Airport		Civilian								
Meulaboh	Aceh	WITC	MEQ	Cut Nyak Dhien Airport		Civilian	Cut Nyak Dhien, leader of the Acehnese guerrilla forces during the Aceh War							
Muara Bungo	Jambi	WIPI	BUU	Muara Bungo Airport		Civilian								
Mukomuko	Bengkulu	WIPU	MPC	Mukomuko Airport		Civilian								
Padang	West Sumatra	WIEE	PDG	Minangkabau International Airport		Civilian	Minangkabau people, the natives of West Sumatra							
Padang Sidempuan	North Sumatra	WIME	AEG	Aek Godang Airport		Civilian								
Pagar Alam	South Sumatra	WIPY	PXA	Atung Bungsu Airport		Civilian								
Palembang	South Sumatra	WIPP	PLM	Sultan Mahmud Badaruddin II International Airport formerly Talang Betutu Airport		Civilian	Mahmud Badaruddin II, last Sultan of Palembang							
Payakumbuh	West Sumatra			Piobang Airport		Civilian								
Pangkal Pinang	Bangka–Belitung Islands	WIPK	PGK	Depati Amir Airport		Civilian								
Pasir Pengaraian	Riau	WIDE	PPR	Tuanku Tambusai Airport		Civilian								
Pekanbaru	Riau	WIBB	PKU	Sultan Syarif Kasim II International Airport formerly Simpang Tiga Airport		Civilian / Military	Syarif Kasim II, last Sultan of Siak							
Ranai	Riau Islands	WION	NTX	Ranai Airport formerly Raden Sadjad Airport		Civilian / Military								
Rengat	Riau Islands	WIBJ	RGT	Japura Airport		Civilian								
Sabang	Aceh	WIAB	SBG	Maimun Saleh Airport		Civilian / Military	Maimun Saleh, former Indonesian Air Force pilot							
Sibolga	North Sumatra	WIMS	FLZ	Ferdinand Lumban Tobing Airport formerly Pinangsori Airport		Civilian	Ferdinand Lumban Tobing, former Indonesian minister and Governor of North Sumatra							
Siborong-Borong	North Sumatra	WIMN	DTB	Raja Sisingamangaraja XII Airport formerly Silangit Airport		Civilian	Sisingamangaraja XII, Batak leader							
Simalungun	North Sumatra	WIMP	SIW	Sibisa Airport		Civilian								
Simpang Ampek	West Sumatra	—	—	Pusako Anak Nagari Airport		Civilian								
Sinabang	Aceh	WITG	LKI	Lasikin Airport		Civilian								
Singkil	Aceh	WIMI	—	Syekh Hamzah Fansyuri Airport		Civilian								
Sipora	West Sumatra	WIBR	RKI	Rokot Airport		Civilian								
Sungai Pakning	Riau	WIBS	SEQ	Sei Pakning Airport		Civilian								
Takengon	Aceh	WITK	TXE	Rembele Airport		Civilian								
Tanjung Balai Karimun	Riau Islands	WIBT	TJB	Raja Haji Abdullah Airport formerly Sei Bati Airport		Civilian								
Tanjung Pandan	Bangka–Belitung Islands	WIKT	TJQ	H.A.S. Hanandjoeddin International Airport formerly Buluh Tumbang Airport		Civilian	H.A.S. Hanandjoeddin, Indonesian Air Force pioneer and former regent of the Belitung Regency							
Tanjung Pinang	Riau Islands	WIDN	TNJ	Raja Haji Fisabilillah Airport formerly Kijang Airport		Civilian / Military	Raja Haji Fisabilillah, warrior from Riau							
Tembilahan	Riau	—	—	Tempuling Airport		Civilian								
Way Tuba	Lampung	WIPO	WYK	Gatot Subroto Airport		Civilian / Military								
Kalimantan and outlying islands
Balikpapan	East Kalimantan	WALL	BPN	Sultan Aji Muhammad Sulaiman Sepinggan Airport formerly Sepinggan Airport		Civilian	Aji Muhammad Sulaiman, Sultan of Kutai Kertanagara							
Banjarmasin	South Kalimantan	WAOO	BDJ	Syamsudin Noor International Airport formerly Ulin Airport		Civilian	Syamsudin Noor, Indonesian Air Force officer from South Kalimantan							
Batulicin	South Kalimantan	WAOC	BTW	Batu Licin Airport		Civilian								
Berau	East Kalimantan	WAQT	BEJ	Kalimarau Airport		Civilian / Military								
Bontang	East Kalimantan	WALC	BXT	PT Badak Bontang Airport		Civilian								
Derawan Islands	East Kalimantan	WAQC	RTU	Maratua Airport		Civilian								
Ketapang	West Kalimantan	WIOK	KTG	Rahadi Oesman Airport		Civilian	Rahadi Osman, West Kalimantan freedom fighter							
Kotabaru	South Kalimantan	WAOK	KBU	Gusti Syamsir Alam Airport formerly Stagen Airport		Civilian								
Kuala Pembuang	Central Kalimantan	WAGF	KLP	Seruyan Kuala Pembuang Airport		Civilian								
Long Apung	North Kalimantan	WAQL	LPU	Long Apung Airport		Civilian								
Long Bawan	North Kalimantan	WAQJ	LBW	Juvai Semaring Airport		Civilian								
Mahakam Ulu	East Kalimantan	WALJ	DTD	Datah Dawai Airport		Civilian								
Malinau	North Kalimantan	WALM	LNU	Robert Atty Bessing Airport		Civilian								
Melak	East Kalimantan	WALE	GHS	West Kutai Melalan Airport		Civilian								
Muara Teweh	Central Kalimantan	WAGB	HMS	Haji Muhammad Sidik Airport		Civilian								
Nanga Pinoh	West Kalimantan	WIOG	NPO	Nanga Pinoh Airport		Civilian								
Nunukan	North Kalimantan	WAQA	NNX	Nunukan Airport		Civilian								
Nusantara	East Kalimantan	WALK	—	Nusantara International Airport		Civilian								
Palangkaraya	Central Kalimantan	WAGG	PKY	Tjilik Riwut Airport formerly Panarung Airport		Civilian	Tjilik Riwut, Indonesian Air Force officer and former Governor of Central Kalimantan							
Pangkalanbun	Central Kalimantan	WAGI	PKN	Iskandar Airport		Civilian / Military	Iskandar, paratrooper from Central Kalimantan							
Pontianak	West Kalimantan	WIOO	PNK	Supadio International Airport formerly Sungai Durian Airport		Civilian / Military	Supadio, Indonesian Air Force officer							
Putussibau	West Kalimantan	WIOP	PSU	Pangsuma Airport		Civilian								
Samarinda	East Kalimantan	WALS	AAP	Aji Pangeran Tumenggung Pranoto International Airport		Civilian	APT Pranoto, Kutai nobleman and first governor of East Kalimantan							
Sampit	Central Kalimantan	WAGS	SMQ	H. Asan Airport		Civilian								
Singkawang	West Kalimantan	WIOD	SKJ	Singkawang Airport		Civilian								
Sintang	West Kalimantan	WIOS	SQG	Tebelian Airport		Civilian								
Tanjung Selor	North Kalimantan	WAQD	TJS	Tanjung Harapan Airport		Civilian								
Tarakan	North Kalimantan	WAQQ	TRK	Juwata Airport		Civilian / Military								
Sulawesi and outlying islands
Ampana	Central Sulawesi	WAFU	OJU	Tanjung Api Airport		Civilian								
Banggai	Central Sulawesi	BQR	WAFQ	Bandar Udara Maulana Prins Mandapar		Civilian								
Baubau	Southeast Sulawesi	WAWB	BUW	Betoambari Airport		Civilian			Banggai	Central Sulawesi	BQR	WAFQ	Bandar Udara Maulana Prins Mandapar	Civilian
Buol	Central Sulawesi	WAFY	UOL	Pogogul Airport		Civilian								
Gorontalo	Gorontalo	WAMG	GTO	Djalaluddin Airport formerly Tolotio Airport		Civilian	Djalaluddin Tantu, Gorontaloan colonel of the Indonesian Air Force							
Kendari	Southeast Sulawesi	WAWW	KDI	Haluoleo Airport formerly Wolter Monginsidi Airport		Civilian	Halu Oleo, Sultan of Buton							
Kolaka	Southeast Sulawesi	WAWP	KXB	Sangia Nibandera Airport		Civilian	Raja Sangia Nibandera, first king of the Mekongga tribe (indigenous people of Kolaka)							
Luwuk	Central Sulawesi	WAFW	LUW	Syukuran Aminuddin Amir Airport formerly Bubung Airport		Civilian								
Makassar	South Sulawesi	WAAA	UPG	Sultan Hasanuddin International Airport		Civilian / Military	Hasanuddin, former Sultan of Gowa							
Mamuju	West Sulawesi	WAAJ	MJU	Tampa Padang Airport		Civilian								
Manado	North Sulawesi	WAMM	MDC	Sam Ratulangi International Airport		Civilian / Military	Sam Ratulangi, Minahasa politician							
Masamba	South Sulawesi	WAWN	MXB	Andi Jemma Airport		Civilian								
Miangas	North Sulawesi	WAMS	IAX	Miangas Airport		Civilian								
Melonguane	North Sulawesi	WAMN	MNA	Melangguane Airport		Civilian								
Morowali	Central Sulawesi	WAFO	MOH	Maleo Airport		Civilian								
Palu	Central Sulawesi	WAFF	PLW	Mutiara SIS Al-Jufrie Airport formerly Masovu Airport		Civilian	Sayyid Idrus bin Salim Al-Jufri, Central Sulawesi religious figure							
Poso	Central Sulawesi	WAMP	PSJ	Kasiguncu Airport		Civilian								
Palopo	South Sulawesi	WAFD	LLO	Bua Airport formerly Lagaligo Airport		Civilian								
Raha	Southeast Sulawesi	WAWR	RAQ	Sugimanuru Airport		Civilian								
Sangihe	North Sulawesi	WAMH	NAH	Naha Airport		Civilian								
Seko	South Sulawesi	WAFN	SKO	Seko Airport		Civilian								
Selayar	South Sulawesi	WAWH	KSR	H. Aroeppala Airport		Civilian								
Sorowako	South Sulawesi	WAWS	SQR	Sorowako Airport		Civilian								
Tana Toraja	South Sulawesi	WAFB	TRT	Toraja Airport formerly Buntu Kunik Airport		Civilian								
Wangi-Wangi	Southeast Sulawesi	WAWD	WNI	Matahora Airport		Civilian								
Lesser Sunda Islands
Alor Island	East Nusa Tenggara	WATM	ARD	Alor Island Airport formerly Mali Airport		Civilian								
Atambua	East Nusa Tenggara	WATA	ABU	A. A. Bere Tallo Airport formerly Haliwen Airport		Civilian								
Bima	West Nusa Tenggara	WADB	BMU	Sultan Muhammad Salahudin Airport formerly Palibelo Airport		Civilian	Muhammad Salahuddin, last Sultan of Bima							
Buleleng	Bali	WADE	WSN	Lt. Col. Wisnu Airfield		Civilian	I Gusti Putu Wisnu, Balinese freedom fighter							
Denpasar	Bali	WADD	DPS	Ngurah Rai International Airport		Civilian	I Gusti Ngurah Rai, Balinese military leader during National Revolution							
Ende	East Nusa Tenggara	WATE	ENE	H. Hasan Aroeboesman Airport formerly Ippi Airport		Civilian	H. Hasan Aroeboesman, last king of Ende and first regent of Ende							
Kupang	East Nusa Tenggara	WATT	KOE	El Tari Airport formerly Penfui Airport		Civilian / Military	El Tari, former governor of East Nusa Tenggara							
Larantuka	East Nusa Tenggara	WATL	LKA	Gewayantana Airport		Civilian								
Labuan Bajo	East Nusa Tenggara	WATO	LBJ	Komodo International Airport formerly Mutiara II Airport		Civilian	Komodo dragon, a large species of lizard found in the Indonesian islands of Komodo							
Lewoleba	East Nusa Tenggara	WATW	LWE	Wonopito Airport		Civilian								
Mataram	West Nusa Tenggara	WADL	LOP	Lombok International Airport		Civilian	Zainuddin Abdul Madjid, Indonesian religious figure from Lombok							
Maumere	East Nusa Tenggara	WATC	MOF	Frans Xavier Seda Airport formerly Wai Oti Airport		Civilian	Frans Seda, former Indonesian minister							
Rote	East Nusa Tenggara	WATR	RTI	David Constantijn Saudale Airport formerly Lekunik Airport		Civilian								
Ruteng	East Nusa Tenggara	WATG	RTG	Frans Sales Lega Airport formerly Satar Tacik Airport		Civilian								
Sabu	East Nusa Tenggara	WATS	SAU	Tardamu Airport		Civilian								
Sumbawa Besar	West Nusa Tenggara	WADS	SWQ	Sultan Muhammad Kaharuddin III Airport formerly Brangbiji Airport		Civilian	Muhammad Kaharuddin III, last Sultan of Sumbawa and first Regent of Sumbawa							
Tambolaka	East Nusa Tenggara	WATK	TMC	Lede Kalumbang Airport formerly Tambolaka Airport		Civilian								
Waingapu	East Nusa Tenggara	WATU	WGP	Umbu Mehang Kunda Airport formerly Mau Hau Airport		Civilian								
Maluku Islands
Amahai	Maluku	WAPA	AHI	Amahai Airport		Civilian								
Ambon	Maluku	WAPP	AMQ	Pattimura Airport formerly Laha Airport		Civilian	Pattimura, a National Hero of Indonesia							
Banda	Maluku	WAPC	NDA	Bandanaira Airport		Civilian								
Benjina	Maluku	WAPK	BJK	Nangasuri Aru Airport		Civilian								
Bobong	North Maluku	–	–	Bobong Airport		Civilian								
Buli	North Maluku	WAEM	PGQ	Buli Airport		Civilian								
Dobo	Maluku	WAPD	DOB	Rar Gwamar Airport		Civilian								
Galela	North Maluku	WAEG	GLX	Gamar Malamo Airport		Civilian								
Kao	North Maluku	WAEK	KAZ	Kuabang Airport		Civilian								
Kisar	Maluku	WATQ	KSX	John Becker Airport		Civilian								
Labuha	North Maluku	WAEL	LAH	Oesman Sadik Airport		Civilian								
Moa	Maluku	—	JIO	Jos Orno Imsula Airport		Civilian								
Morotai	North Maluku	WAMR	OTI	Leo Wattimena Airport formerly Pitu Airport		Civilian / Military	Leo Wattimena, Indonesian Air Force Air vice-marshal							
Namlea	Maluku	WAPR	NAM	Namlea Airport		Civilian								
Namrole	Maluku	WAPG	NRE	Namrole Airport		Civilian								
Sanana	North Maluku	WAPN	SQN	Emalamo Airport		Civilian								
Saumlaki	Maluku	WAPS	SXK	Mathilda Batlayeri Airport		Civilian								
Ternate	North Maluku	WAEE	TTE	Sultan Babullah Airport		Civilian	Babullah, 7th Sultan of Ternate, and a National Hero of Indonesia							
Tual	Maluku	WAPF	LUV	Karel Sadsuitubun Airport		Civilian								
Western New Guinea and outlying islands
Agats	South Papua	—	EWE	Ewer Airport		Civilian								
Anggi	West Papua	—	AGD	Anggi Airport		Civilian								
Ayawasi	Southwest Papua	WASA	AYW	Ayawasi Airport		Civilian								
Babo	West Papua	WASO	BXB	Babo Airport		Civilian								
Biak	Papua	WABB	BIK	Frans Kaisiepo Airport		Civilian / Military	Frans Kaisiepo, Papuan nationalist and former Governor of Papua							
Bintuni	West Papua	WASB	NTI	Steenkool Airport		Civilian								
Bokondini	Highland Papua	WAJB	BUI	Bokondini Airport		Civilian								
Dekai	Highland Papua	WAVD	DEX	Nop Goliat Dekai Airport		Civilian								
Enarotali	Central Papua	WAYE	EWI	Enarotali Airport		Civilian								
Fakfak	West Papua	WASF	FKQ	Siboru Airport		Civilian								
Jayapura	Papua	WAJJ	DJJ	Sentani International Airport		Civilian	Theys Eluay, Papuan politician and former leader of Papua Presidium Council							
Kaimana	West Papua	WASK	KNG	Utarom Airport		Civilian								
Manokwari	West Papua	WAUU	MKW	Rendani Airport		Civilian								
Merauke	South Papua	WAKK	MKQ	Mopah Airport		Civilian								
Nabire	Central Papua	WABI	NBX	Douw Aturure Airport		Civilian								
Noemfoor	Papua	—	FOO	Kornasoren Airport		Civilian								
Oksibil	Highland Papua	WAJO	OKL	Oksibil Airport		Civilian								
Sinak	Central Papua	WABS	NKD	Sinak Airport		Civilian								
Sorong	Southwest Papua	WASS	SOQ	Domine Eduard Osok International Airport		Civilian	Domine Eduard Osok, pastor from Sorong							
Serui	Papua	ZRI	WABO	Stevanus Rumbewas Airport		Civilian	Stevanus Rumbewas, Indonesian Navy officer from Serui							
Tanahmerah	South Papua	WAKT	TMH	Tanah Merah Airport		Civilian								
Timika	Central Papua	WABP	TIM	Moses Kilangin Airport		Civilian								
Waisai	Southwest Papua	WASN	RJM	Marinda Airport		Civilian								
Wamena	Highland Papua	WAVV	WMX	Wamena Airport		Civilian								
Wasior	West Papua	WASW	WSR	Wasior Airport		Civilian								
Werur	Southwest Papua	WAJY	WRR	Werur Airport		Civilian								

=== Military-exclusive airports ===
Location	Province	ICAO	IATA	Airport name	Coordinates	Named after	Reference
Tulang Bawang	Lampung	WIAG	AKQ	Prince M. Bunyamin Air Force Base			
Bogor	West Java	WIAJ	—	Atang Senjaya Air Force Base		Atang Senjaya, Indonesian aviation pioneer from West Java	
Bandung	West Java	WICK	—	Sulaiman Air Force Base			
Magetan	East Java	WARI	MDN	Iswahjudi Air Force Base		Iswahyudi, Indonesian Air Force officer	
Medan	North Sumatra	WIMK	MES	Soewondo Air Force Base formerly Polonia International Airport		Soewondo, an Indonesian Air Force pilot from Ponorogo who was killed during operations to suppress the PRRI rebellion in 1958	
Padang	West Sumatra	WIMG	—	Sutan Sjahrir Air Force Base formerly Tabing Airport		Sutan Sjahrir, Indonesia's first Prime Minister	
Subang	West Java	WIIK	—	Suryadarma Air Force Base formerly Kalijati Air Force Base		Suryadi Suryadarma, the first commander-in-chief of the Indonesian Air Force	
Southeast Maluku	Maluku	WAPL	—	Dominicus Dumatubun Air Force Base formerly Dominicus Dumatubun Airport		Dominicus Dumatubun, a native of Langgur, the capital of Southeast Maluku Regency, and an Indonesia. Air Force pilot who died during a night training flight	

=== Defunct airports ===
Location served	Province	ICAO	IATA	Airport name	Coordinates	Named after	Reference
Fakfak	West Papua	~~WASF~~	~~FKQ~~	Torea Airport			
Jakarta	Special Capital Region of Jakarta	~~WIID~~	~~JKT~~	Kemayoran Airport			
Mataram	West Nusa Tenggara	~~WADA~~	~~AMI~~	Selaparang Airport			
Muara Teweh	Central Kalimantan	~~WAGB~~	~~HMS~~	Beringin Airport			
Nabire	Central Papua	~~WABI~~	~~NBX~~	Douw Aturure Airport			
Samarinda	East Kalimantan	~~WALS~~	~~SRI~~	Temindung Airport			
Sintang	West Kalimantan	~~WIOS~~	~~SQG~~	Susilo Airport			
Sorong	Southwest Papua	~~WASS~~	~~SOQ~~	Jefman Airport			
Surabaya	East Java	~~WRSP~~		Morokrembangan Naval Air Base			
Tana Toraja	South Sulawesi	~~WAFT~~	~~TTR~~	Pongtiku Airport			
Thousand Islands	Special Capital Region of Jakarta	~~WIHG~~	~~PPJ~~	Panjang Island Airport	5.643833°S 106.56266°E		
Tual	Maluku	~~WAPF~~	~~LUV~~	Dumatubin Airport			

== See also ==
- Aviation in Indonesia
- Transport in Indonesia
- List of airports by ICAO code: W#WA WI WQ WR - Indonesia
- Wikipedia:WikiProject Aviation/Airline destination lists: Asia#Indonesia
