= Citilink =

Low-cost airline of Indonesia

PT Citilink Indonesia

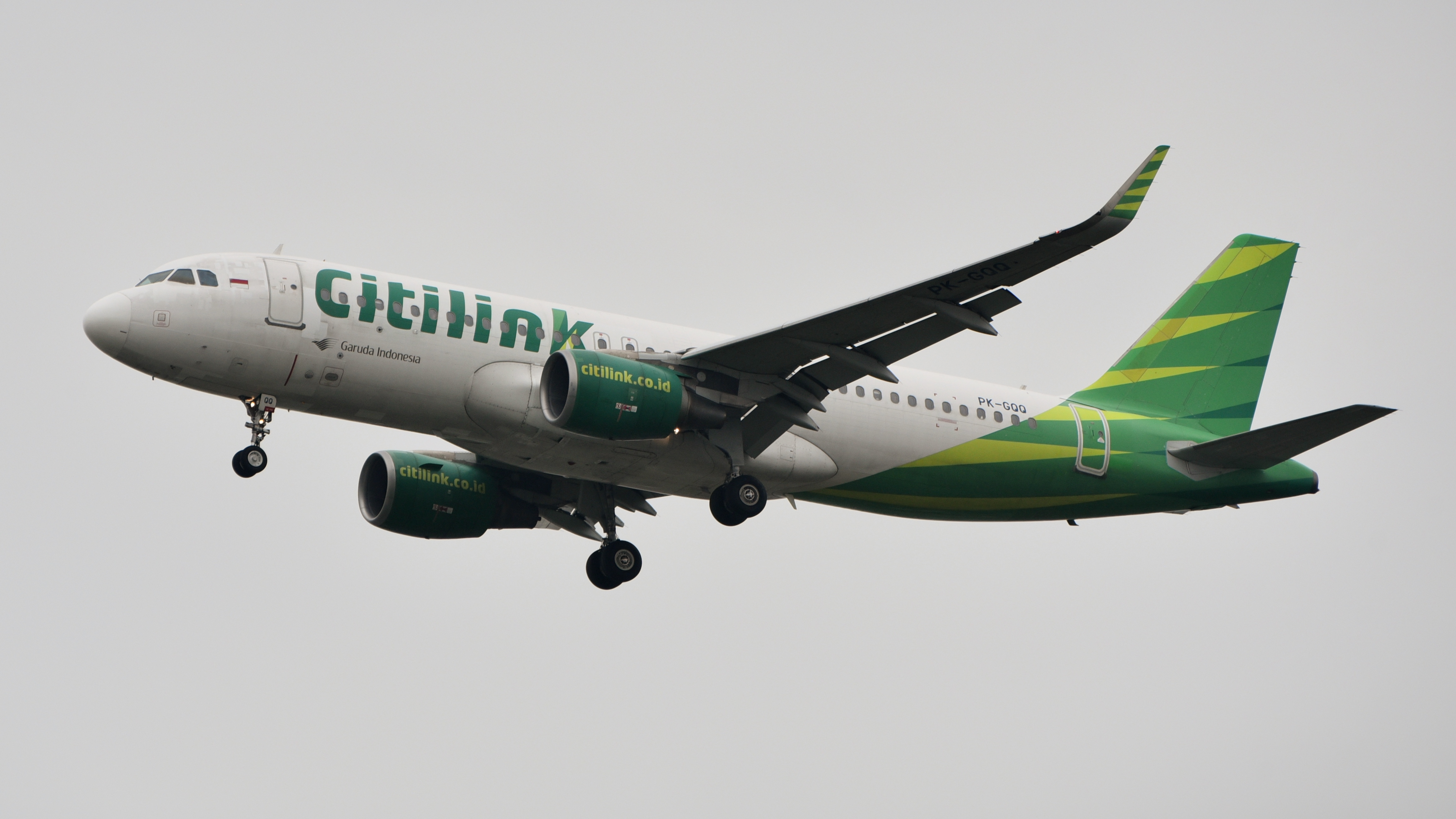
- Citilink Airbus A320
IATA	ICAO	Call sign
QG	CTV	SUPERGREEN
- Commenced operations: 16 July 2001; 25 years ago
- Operating bases: Batam; Denpasar; Jakarta–Halim Perdanakusuma; Jakarta–Soekarno-Hatta; Makassar; Medan; Surabaya
- Frequent-flyer program: LinkMiles
- Fleet size: 59
- Destinations: 45
- Parent company: Garuda Indonesia
- Headquarters: Jakarta, Indonesia
- Key people: Dewa Kadek Rai (CEO)
- Operating income: ▲US$67.08 million (2019)
- Net income: ▲US$9.96 million (2016)
- Website: www.citilink.co.id

Citilink is an Indonesian low-cost airline headquartered in Jakarta. Established in July 2001 as a low-cost brand of Garuda Indonesia, it operates services to domestic and regional destinations. Since 30 July 2012, Citilink has officially operated as a separate subsidiary of Garuda Indonesia, operating with its own callsign, airline codes, logo, and uniform. Its main base is Soekarno–Hatta International Airport (serving Jakarta) and Juanda International Airport (serving nearby Surabaya). The company slogan is Better Fly, Citilink.

== History ==
Garuda Indonesia established Citilink as a low-cost brand in 2001 and operations commenced on 16 July that year with two Fokker F28 Fellowships transferred from the mainline fleet. Initial operations were from Surabaya on the island of Java to destinations not served by Garuda Indonesia's mainline fleet: Yogyakarta (also on Java); Balikpapan on the island of Borneo and Tarakan, North Kalimantan, just off Borneo's coast; and Makassar on the island of Sulawesi.

By the end of 2001, Garuda had transferred five F28s to Citilink. In 2004, Citilink was serving ten destinations and Garuda began to replace the F28s with Boeing 737-300s. In 2008, Garuda temporarily suspended operations of Citilink, relaunching the brand in January 2009 after replacing the remaining Fokker F28s with more modern aircraft. In July 2010, Citilink operations were being conducted by two Boeing 737-300s and a Boeing 737-400.

=== Spinoff and expansion plans ===
In May 2011, Garuda announced plans for a spin-off of Citilink. The new business plan was for Citilink to become a separate business entity in the first quarter of 2012 with a full brand overhaul for the airline, including a new livery design; a new website; a new cabin interior design and cabin crew uniforms; and new advertising and marketing strategies. An integral part of this plan was for Citilink to secure 25 new Airbus A320s and utilising these new and more economical aircraft to expand into a significant regional low-cost carrier with the anticipation that by 2015, Citilink would contribute 30 percent of Garuda Indonesia's revenue.

After obtaining an Air Operator's Certificate in August 2012, Citilink had carried 8 million passengers by the end of 2013 and was running at a load factor of 85 percent and an On-Time Arrival rate of 87 percent. In May 2015 the airline's fleet consisted of four Boeing 737-300s, four Boeing 737-500s, and thirty-four Airbus A320s.

In late 2019, Citilink took delivery of two Airbus A330-900s originally ordered by WOW Air which are to be used for flights to Germany, Japan, and Saudi Arabia. In June 2022, both Airbus A330-900s left the Citilink fleet and were transferred to Garuda Indonesia to complement the airline's Hajj operations. Both aircraft has since been transferred back to Citilink.

== Destinations ==
As of May 2026, Citilink flies (or has flown) to the following destinations:

Country	City	Airport	Notes	Refs
Australia	Melbourne/Geelong	Avalon Airport	Terminated	
Australia	Perth	Perth Airport	Terminated	
Cambodia	Phnom Penh	Phnom Penh International Airport	Airport closed	
China	Chongqing	Chongqing Jiangbei International Airport	Charter	
East Timor	Dili	Presidente Nicolau Lobato International Airport		
Indonesia	Ambon	Pattimura Airport		
Indonesia	Atambua	A. A. Bere Tallo Airport	Terminated	
Indonesia	Bajawa	Soa Airport	Terminated	
Indonesia	Balikpapan	Sultan Aji Muhammad Sulaiman Sepinggan Airport		
Indonesia	Banda Aceh	Sultan Iskandar Muda International Airport		
Indonesia	Bandar Lampung	Radin Inten II International Airport		
Indonesia	Bandung	Husein Sastranegara Airport		
Indonesia	Bandung	Kertajati International Airport	Terminated	
Indonesia	Banjarmasin	Syamsudin Noor International Airport		
Indonesia	Banyuwangi	Banyuwangi Airport		
Indonesia	Batam	Hang Nadim International Airport	Hub	
Indonesia	Bau Bau	Betoambari Airport	Terminated	
Indonesia	Bima	Sultan Muhammad Salahudin Airport	Terminated	
Indonesia	Bengkulu	Fatmawati Soekarno Airport		
Indonesia	Berau	Kalimarau Airport		
Indonesia	Cepu	Ngloram Airport	Terminated	
Indonesia	Denpasar	Ngurah Rai International Airport		
Indonesia	Ende	H. Hasan Aroeboesman Airport	Terminated	
Indonesia	Gorontalo	Djalaluddin Airport	Terminated	
Indonesia	Gunungsitoli	Binaka Airport	Terminated	
Indonesia	Jakarta	Halim Perdanakusuma International Airport	Hub	
Indonesia	Jakarta	Soekarno–Hatta International Airport	Hub	
Indonesia	Jambi	Sultan Thaha Airport		
Indonesia	Jayapura	Sentani International Airport		
Indonesia	Kediri	Dhoho Airport		
Indonesia	Kendari	Haluoleo Airport		
Indonesia	Ketapang	Rahadi Oesman Airport	Terminated	
Indonesia	Kolaka	Sangia Nibandera Airport	Terminated	
Indonesia	Kupang	El Tari Airport		
Indonesia	Labuan Bajo	Komodo International Airport		
Indonesia	Larantuka	Gewayantana Airport	Terminated	
Indonesia	Lhokseumawe	Malikus Saleh Airport	Terminated	
Indonesia	Makassar	Sultan Hasanuddin International Airport	Hub	
Indonesia	Manado	Sam Ratulangi International Airport		
Indonesia	Mataram	Lombok International Airport		
Indonesia	Malang	Abdul Rachman Saleh Airport		
Indonesia	Mamuju	Tampa Padang Airport	Terminated	
Indonesia	Maumere	Frans Xavier Seda Airport	Terminated	
Indonesia	Medan	Kualanamu International Airport	Hub	
Indonesia	Padang	Minangkabau International Airport		
Indonesia	Padang Sidempuan	Aek Godang Airport	Terminated	
Indonesia	Palangkaraya	Tjilik Riwut Airport		
Indonesia	Palembang	Sultan Mahmud Badaruddin II International Airport		
Indonesia	Palopo	Bua Airport	Terminated	
Indonesia	Palu	Mutiara SIS Al-Jufrie Airport		
Indonesia	Pangkalan Bun	Iskandar Airport	Terminated	
Indonesia	Pangkal Pinang	Depati Amir Airport		
Indonesia	Pekanbaru	Sultan Syarif Kasim II International Airport		
Indonesia	Pontianak	Supadio International Airport		
Indonesia	Purbalingga	General Sudirman Airport	Terminated	
Indonesia	Putussibau	Pangsuma Airport	Terminated	
Indonesia	Samarinda	Aji Pangeran Tumenggung Pranoto International Airport		
Indonesia	Sampit	H. Asan Airport	Terminated	
Indonesia	Semarang	Jenderal Ahmad Yani International Airport		
Indonesia	Sibolga	Ferdinand Lumban Tobing Airport	Terminated	
Indonesia	Siborong-Borong	Raja Sisingamangaraja XII Airport	Terminated	
Indonesia	Sorong	Domine Eduard Osok Airport	Terminated	
Indonesia	Sumenep	Trunojoyo Airport	Terminated	
Indonesia	Solo	Adisoemarmo International Airport		
Indonesia	Surabaya	Juanda International Airport	Hub	
Indonesia	Tambolaka	Lede Kalumbang Airport	Terminated	
Indonesia	Tanjung Pandan	H.A.S. Hanandjoeddin International Airport		
Indonesia	Tanjung Pinang	Raja Haji Fisabilillah Airport		
Indonesia	Tana Toraja	Pongtiku Airport		
Indonesia	Tarakan	Juwata Airport		
Indonesia	Ternate	Sultan Babullah Airport	Terminated	
Indonesia	Timika	Mozes Kilangin Airport	Terminated	
Indonesia	Waingapu	Umbu Mehang Kunda Airport	Terminated	
Indonesia	Way Kanan	Gatot Subroto Airport		
Indonesia	Yogyakarta	Adisutjipto Airport		
Indonesia	Yogyakarta	Yogyakarta International Airport		
Malaysia	Kuala Lumpur	Kuala Lumpur International Airport		
Malaysia	Penang	Penang International Airport	Terminated	
Papua New Guinea	Port Moresby	Port Moresby International Airport	Terminated	
Saudi Arabia	Jeddah	King Abdulaziz International Airport	Seasonal	
Singapore	Singapore	Changi Airport		
Thailand	Bangkok	Don Mueang International Airport		
Vietnam	Da Nang	Da Nang International Airport	Charter	

=== Codeshare agreements ===
Citilink has codeshare agreements with the following airlines:

- Garuda Indonesia

=== Interline agreements ===
- Hahn Air
- Scoot

== Fleet ==
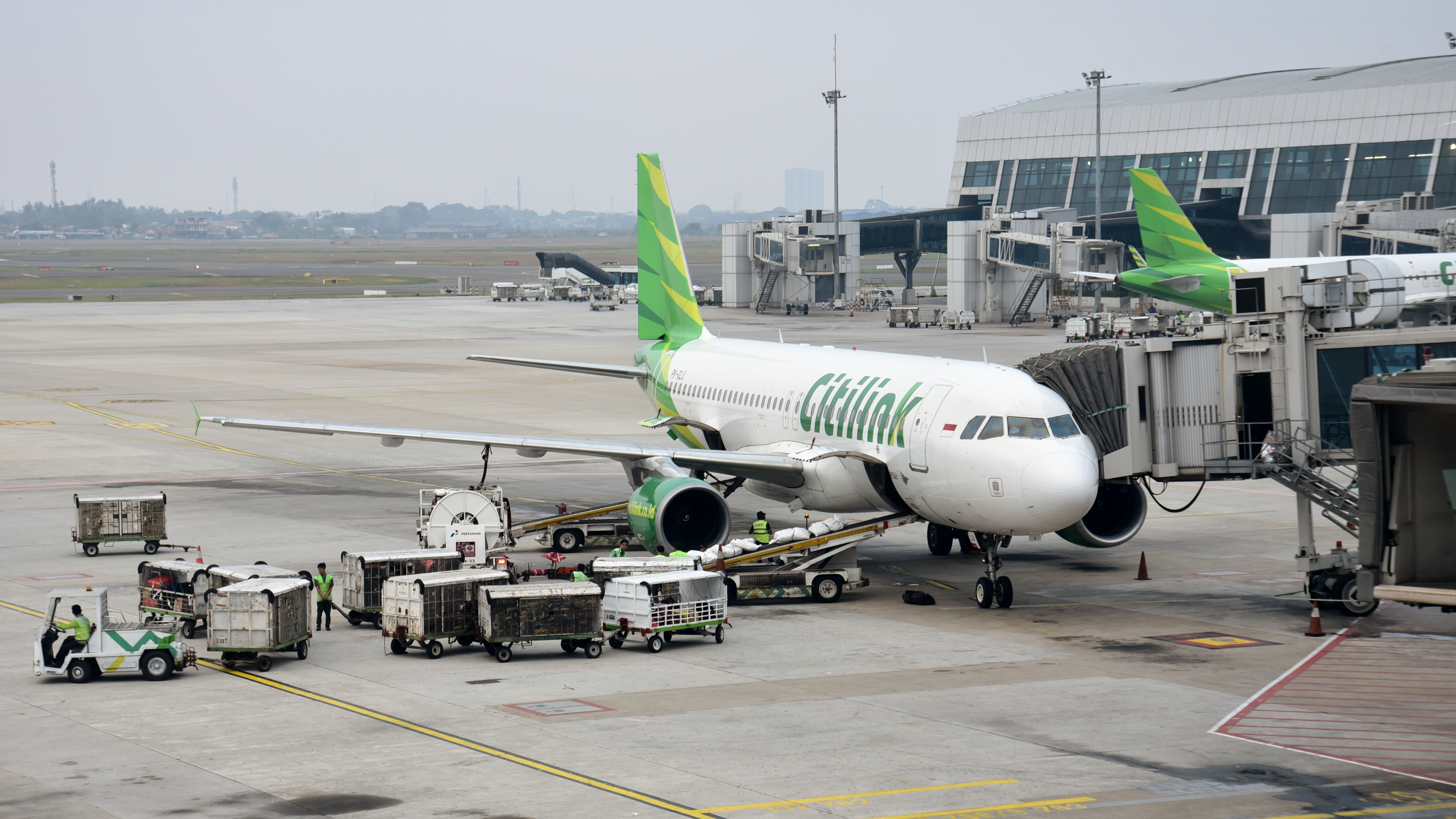
One of Citilink's Airbus A320-200s (PK-GLU) at Soekarno–Hatta International Airport

=== Current fleet ===
As of July 2026, Citilink operates the following aircraft:

Citilink fleet
Aircraft	In service	Orders	Passengers	Notes
Airbus A320-200	39	—	180	Older leased aircraft to be retired and replaced by Airbus A320neo. PK-GQI in a retro livery. PK-GLZ and PK-GLW in a tiket.com livery.
Airbus A320neo	10	25	180	PK-GTF in a special 50th A320 livery. Replacing older Airbus A320-200s.
Airbus A330-300	1			
ATR 72-600	8	—	70	
Boeing 737-500	1	—	Cargo	
Total	59	25		

=== Fleet development ===
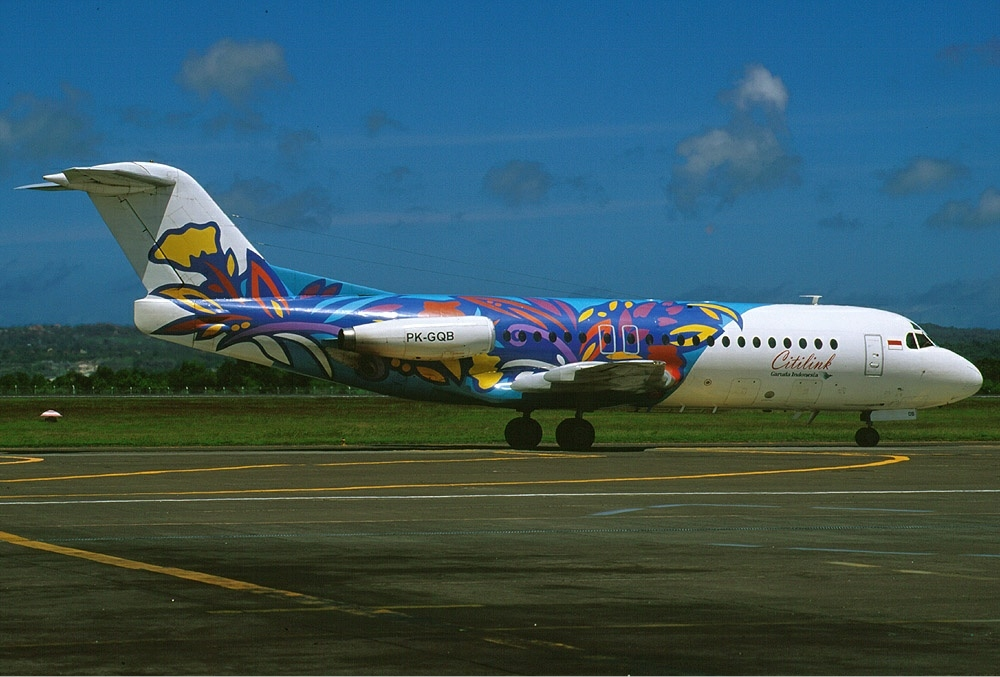
Citilink Fokker F28-4000 Fellowship in its initial livery, photographed in 2003.

On 9 August 2011, Garuda Indonesia finalised an order for 25 Airbus A320 aircraft with options for 25 more, making the airline a new customer for the Airbus single-aisle aircraft type. The order consisted of 15 Airbus A320s and 10 Airbus A320neos, with five aircraft expected to be delivered each year between 2014 and 2018. The fleet upgrade program was valued at around $2.13 billion.

By late 2011, Garuda Indonesia was seeking more used A320s in preparation for the launch of proposed international Citilink services in 2012.

In December 2012, Citilink placed an order for 25 ATR 72-600s with options for 25 more. This was Citilink's first direct order from a manufacturer. A direct order for 25 additional A320neos followed in January 2013, bringing up the total order to 35.

Citilink's first A320, a second-hand aircraft, arrived in late June 2011 and entered into service on 16 September 2011, linking Jakarta with Balikpapan, Banjarmasin, and Medan.

=== Former fleet ===
As of August 2025, Citilink operated 39 Airbus A320, 10 Airbus A320neo, 8 ATR 72-600 and 1 Boeing 737-500.

Previously operated
Aircraft	Total	Introduced	Retired	Replacement	Notes
Boeing 737-300	11	2004	2015	Airbus A320	
Boeing 737-400	4	2008	2014	Airbus A320	
Boeing 737-500	3	2015	2018	Airbus A320	Transferred from Garuda Indonesia, 1 aircraft parked.
Fokker 28-3000	2	2001	2006	None	
Fokker 28-4000	4	2001	2005	None	

== Services ==
=== Cabin ===
Citilink aircraft cabins have a standard configuration of 180 seats. In July 2018, Citilink introduced the "Green Zone" programme. Seats on the first five rows and emergency window exit rows are named green seats, while the rest are named regular seats. Passengers wanting to book or request a green seat or a specific regular seat during booking or check-in will be charged a fee. Additional benefits include free snacks, drinks, and insurance.

=== Internet in the air ===
On 16 January 2019, Citilink became the first low-cost carrier in the Asia Pacific region to offer Wi-Fi at 35,000 feet above ground for free using GX Aviation Systems. The first flight with the connectivity feature flew flight number QG684 on the Jakarta to Denpasar route.

== Accidents and incidents ==
=== Citilink Flight 800 incident ===
On 28 December 2016, a video taken by a passenger aboard Citilink Flight 800, a flight from Juanda International Airport in Surabaya to Soekarno–Hatta International Airport in Jakarta went viral after it purportedly showed a drunk pilot making a "bizarre announcement" before takeoff. Several passengers immediately reported the incident to the airline's headquarters. The crew of the flight quickly removed the drunk pilot from the cockpit. Due to the incident, the flight was delayed for an hour.

Citilink immediately took action by sacking the pilot involved in the incident and issuing letters of apology to affected passengers. The Indonesian Transport Ministry apologized publicly to the Indonesian people due to the incident. The ministry later added that the pilot had undergone drug testing, conducted by the Indonesian National Narcotic Agency.

Another video, captured from cameras at the airport security checkpoint, later surfaced and went viral. The footage showed the drunk pilot becoming jittery and nearly losing his balance during the security check. Police investigated the video, resulting in the Indonesian Transport Ministry sending Citilink its very first warning.

In the aftermath of the incident, the CEO of Citilink, Albert Burhan, resigned. The operational director of Citilink, Hadinoto Soedigno, also resigned in response to the incident.

== See also ==
- List of airlines of Indonesia
- List of airports in Indonesia
- Aviation in Indonesia
- Transport in Indonesia
