= Adam Rahayaan =

Indonesian politician

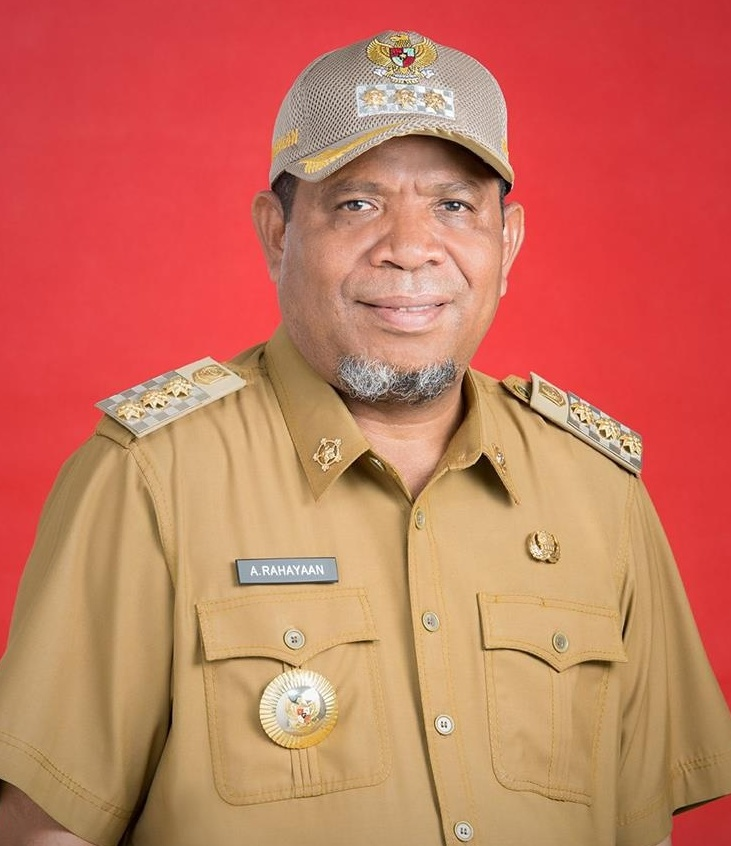

2nd Mayor of Tual
- In office 23 May 2016 – 31 October 2023
- President: Joko Widodo
- Governor: Said Assagaff; Murad Ismail
- Deputy: Abdul Hamid Rahayaan (2017–2018); Usman Tamgne (2018-2023)
- Preceded by: M. M. Taher
- Succeeded by: Akhmad Yani Renuat

1st Vice Mayor of Tual
- In office 2008–2016
- President: Susilo Bambang Yudhoyono; Joko Widodo
- Governor: Karel Albert Ralahalu; Said Assagaff

Personal details
- Born: 27 July 1967 (age 59) Kei Besar, Southeast Maluku Regency
- Party: Prosperous Justice Party
- Education: Alauddin Islamic State University; W.R. Supratman University

Adam Rahayaan is an Indonesian politician who served as mayor of Tual city between 2016 and 2023. He became acting mayor at first on 2016 when the incumbent mayor, M. M. Tamher suddenly died and he as vice mayor took the office in accordance of the law. In 2018 when he decided to run as mayor by himself and was elected. His first full term ended on 31 October 2023, and he was replaced by Akhmad Yani Renuat as acting mayor.

Adam also served as a member of the Regional House of Representatives of Southeast Maluku Regency in 1999 and 2004. He is a member of the Prosperous Justice Party since 1999.
