= Radin Inten II International Airport =

Airport serving Bandar Lampung, Lampung, Indonesia

Radin Inten II International Airport Bandar Udara Internasional Radin Inten II
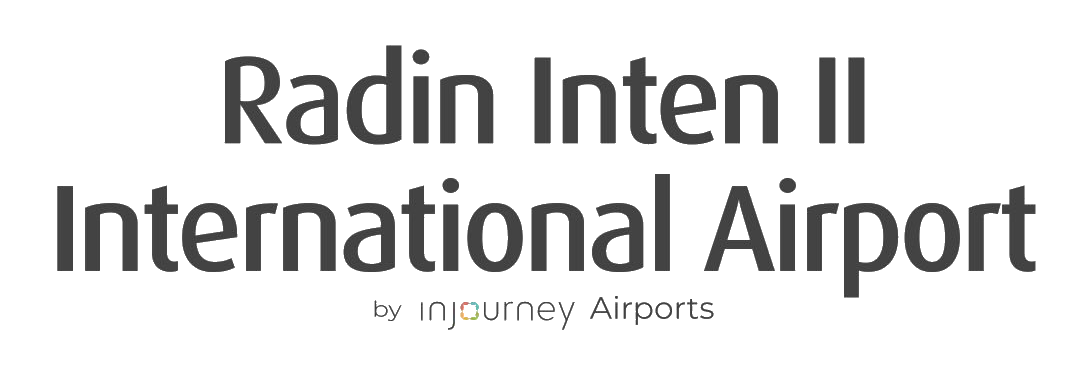

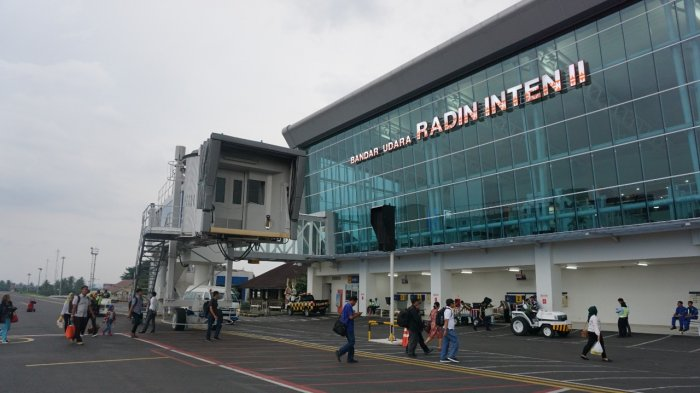
- IATA: TKG; ICAO: WILL; WMO: 96295

Summary
- Airport type: Public
- Owner: Government of Indonesia
- Operator: InJourney Airports
- Serves: Bandar Lampung
- Location: Branti, Natar, South Lampung Regency, Lampung, Indonesia
- Opened: 1942; 84 years ago
- Time zone: WIB (UTC+07:00)
- Elevation AMSL: 282 ft (86 m)
- Coordinates: 05°14′33″S 105°10′44″E
- Website: radininten.injourneyairports.id

Maps
- Sumatra region in Indonesia

- Location of airport in Lampung / Indonesia TKG/WILL (Indonesia)

Runways
Direction	Length		Surface
Direction	ft	m	Surface
14/32	9,842	3,000	Asphalt

Statistics (2024)
- Passengers: 1,171,283 (▲27.5%)
- Cargo (tonnes): 1,726 (▲54.5%)
- Aircraft movements: 8,472 (▲24.4%)
- Source: DGCA

Radin Inten II International Airport (IATA: TKG, ICAO: WILL), formerly known as Branti Airport, is an international airport which serves the city of Bandar Lampung, the capital of Lampung Province, Indonesia. The airport is named after Radin Inten II (1834–1858), a nobleman from Lampung and a National Hero of Indonesia. Although it primarily serves Bandar Lampung, the airport is actually located in Natar, South Lampung Regency, approximately 23 km (14.3 miles) northwest of the city center. It serves as one of the main gateways to Bandar Lampung as well as the surrounding regions and the broader Lampung Province, offering domestic flights to Jakarta, the capital of Indonesia, and Batam. Due to the absence of sustained international services, the airport's international status was briefly revoked in 2024 and reinstated in 2025. Following the reinstation of its international status, the airport began serving international flights to Kuala Lumpur, Malaysia.

== History ==
=== Construction and early history ===
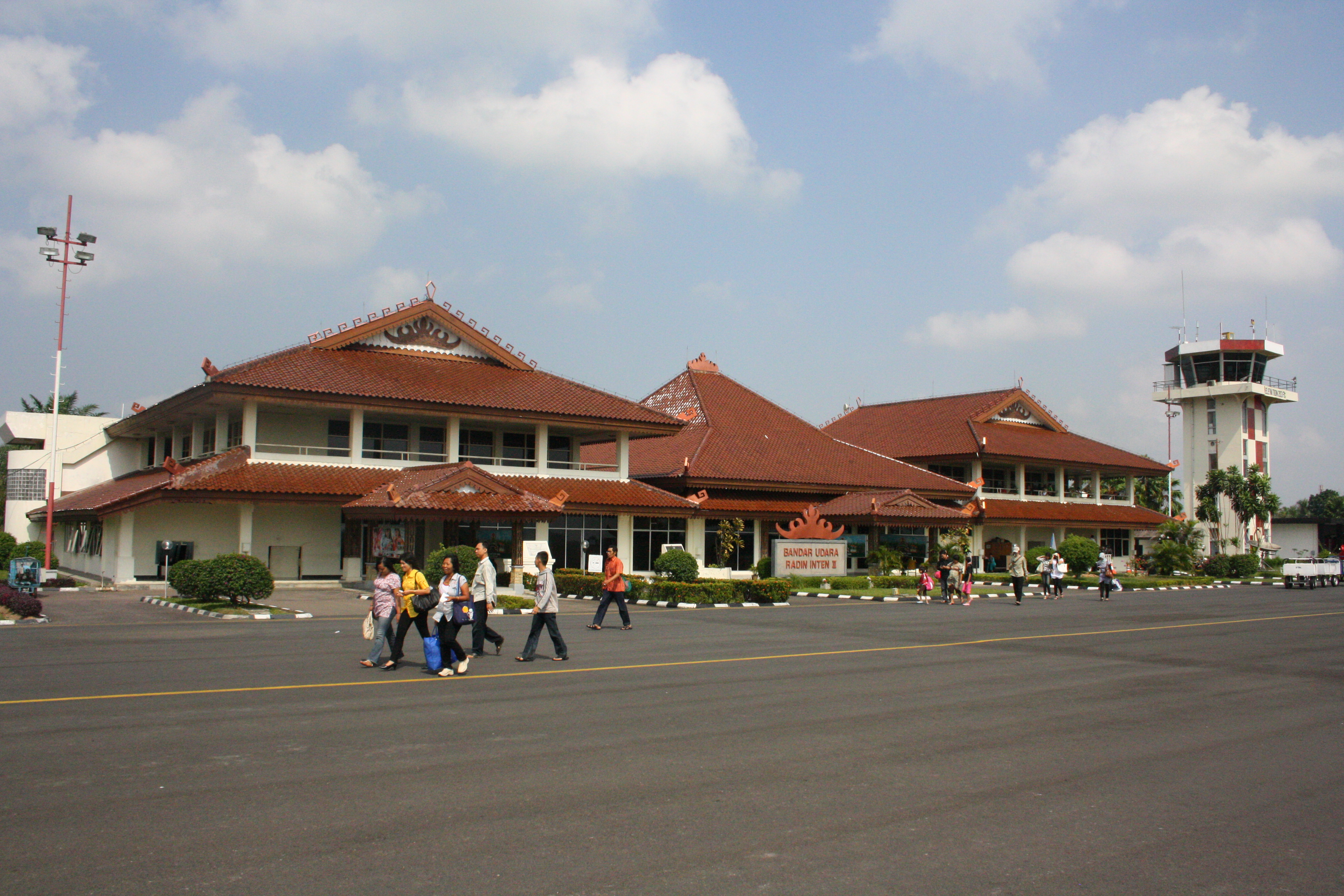
Former terminal of Radin Intern II International Airport, now demolished

Between 1942 and 1945, during the Japanese occupation of the Dutch East Indies as part of the Pacific Theatre of World War II, the Japanese military constructed and operated several airfields across southern Sumatra, including in Lampung, to support its wartime operations. These airfields served as bases for fighter aircraft and logistical hubs for transporting troops, weapons, supplies, personnel, and natural resources. In Lampung, airfields built using rōmusha included Way Tuba Airfield, located between Kotabumi and Martapura, which is now the Gatot Soebroto Army Airfield in Way Kanan Regency, and Menggala Airfield in Tulang Bawang, which has since become Prince M. Bunyamin Air Force Base. In 1943, the Japanese authorities also constructed an airfield in South Lampung, then known as Branti Airfield, named after the nearby village in which it was located. It served as a base for various Japanese aircraft and warplanes.

Following the Japanese surrender in 1945, the airfield was heavily damaged and briefly fell into disuse before being repaired by the Indonesian Air Force in 1946, during the Indonesian National Revolution. Throughout the war, the Dutch targeted the airfield on several occasions, including a bombing raid in July 1947 during Operation Product. The attack, carried out by B-25 Mitchell bombers, caused minor damage to the airfield, including several buildings. When the Dutch launched Operation Kraai in late 1948, they captured the airfield along with Bandar Lampung. It remained under Dutch control until the cessation of hostilities and the withdrawal of Dutch forces from Indonesia following the transfer of sovereignty in 1949, when the airfield was handed over to the Indonesian Air Force.

In 1955, the airport's management was transferred to the Directorate General of Civil Aviation after the Air Force relocated its base to Astra Ksetra Air Force Base in Menggala, North Lampung Regency. Commercial flights began in 1956 when Garuda Indonesia launched its first route between Jakarta and Bandar Lampung. Due to its short runway, the airport could accommodate only smaller aircraft, such as the Douglas DC-3 Dakota. This prompted the government to upgrade the airport's airside facilities, including the runway and apron. Construction of the new runway and apron was completed in 1976, and the airport was officially inaugurated in June of that year with the arrival of a Fokker F28 aircraft.

=== Contemporary history ===
Between 1984 and 1987, the runway was extended by 330 meters, increasing its total length to 1,850 meters. On May 22, 1995, a new terminal was completed and inaugurated by the then Minister of Transportation, Haryanto Dhanutirto. In 1997, the name Branti Airport was officially changed to Radin Inten II Airport, in honor of Radin Inten II—a Lampungese nobleman who led resistance against Dutch colonization in the 19th century and was later recognized as a National Hero of Indonesia.

In 2016, a major expansion project was undertaken at the airport to accommodate the growing volume of passenger and air traffic. This included the construction of a larger passenger terminal and its relevant infrastructures as well as a new four-story parking building. The expansion was completed in 2019 and was inaugurated by then-President Joko Widodo on February 6, 2019. The total cost of the airport's expansion and development amounted to approximately 467.6 billion rupiah. In the same year, the management of the airport was transferred from the Directorate General of Civil Aviation to Angkasa Pura II, which is now known as InJourney Airports. Following the takeover, Angkasa Pura II announced plans to invest up to Rp1.3 trillion in the development of the airport and two other airports, Fatmawati Soekarno Airport in Bengkulu and H.A.S. Hanandjoeddin Airport in Belitung, over the following 30 years.

In 2019, the airport was designated as an international airport, with its first international flight launched on May 4, 2019—a route to Kuala Lumpur, Malaysia, operated by Citilink. However, the service was discontinued shortly afterward. The airport was originally intended to serve as a Hajj embarkation point, offering seasonal flights to Jeddah for pilgrims traveling to Mecca. Despite this, there have been no regular international flights since 2019, and on April 2, 2024, the Ministry of Transportation officially revoked the airport's international status due to the absence of active international services, although it stated that the airport could still be used for Hajj operations if necessary. The airport regained its international status a year later, in August 2025. Following this, international services to Kuala Lumpur resumed in February 2026, operated by Sriwijaya Air and TransNusa as charter flights. TransNusa subsequently upgraded the route to scheduled services in August 2026.

== Facilities and development ==
Boarding gate

A new passenger terminal was constructed between 2017 and 2019 as part of a major airport expansion project aimed at significantly increasing capacity and improving the quality of passenger services. The new terminal nearly tripled the size of the previous facility, expanding from 3,709 m² (39,923 sq ft) to 9,434 m² (101,550 sq ft), and has an annual passenger handling capacity of 3 million. The terminal features modern architecture and incorporates environmentally friendly design elements. It is equipped with two jet bridges. The terminal is equipped with a range of passenger facilities, including restaurants, convenience stores, ATMs, travel agencies, and lounges.

In addition to the passenger terminal, a four-story parking facility covering 2,200 m² (23,681 sq ft) was constructed, providing parking for up to 700 vehicles and connected to the passenger terminal by an airbridge. Other facilities include an administration building, an Aircraft Rescue and Fire Fighting (PKP-PK) building, a sub-PKP-PK building, a generator building, an air traffic control tower operated by AirNav Indonesia, a workshop, an archives building, an equipment building, and other supporting facilities.

Other developments included upgrades to the airside facilities, including the extension of the runway to 3,000 m × 45 m (9,843 ft × 148 ft), enabling it to accommodate wide-body aircraft such as the Airbus A330. The runway is planned to be extended to up to 3,500 m (11,483 ft) in the future. It is also planned to be equipped with an Instrument Landing System (ILS) to enable aircraft to land and take off in a wider range of weather conditions, supporting future international services, including flights to Saudi Arabia for Hajj pilgrims. The project also included the construction of two taxiways, each measuring 123 m × 23 m (404 ft × 75 ft), and an apron measuring 565 m × 110 m (1,854 ft × 361 ft), with 12 parking stands for narrow-body aircraft.

== Airlines and destinations ==
Airlines	Destinations
Batik Air	Jakarta–Soekarno-Hatta
Citilink	Jakarta–Soekarno-Hatta
Garuda Indonesia	Jakarta–Soekarno-Hatta
Indonesia AirAsia	Jakarta–Soekarno-Hatta
Lion Air	Jakarta–Soekarno-Hatta
Sriwijaya Air	Charter: Kuala Lumpur–International
Super Air Jet	Batam, Jakarta–Soekarno-Hatta
Susi Air	Krui
TransNusa	Jakarta–Soekarno-Hatta, Kuala Lumpur–International

== Statistics ==
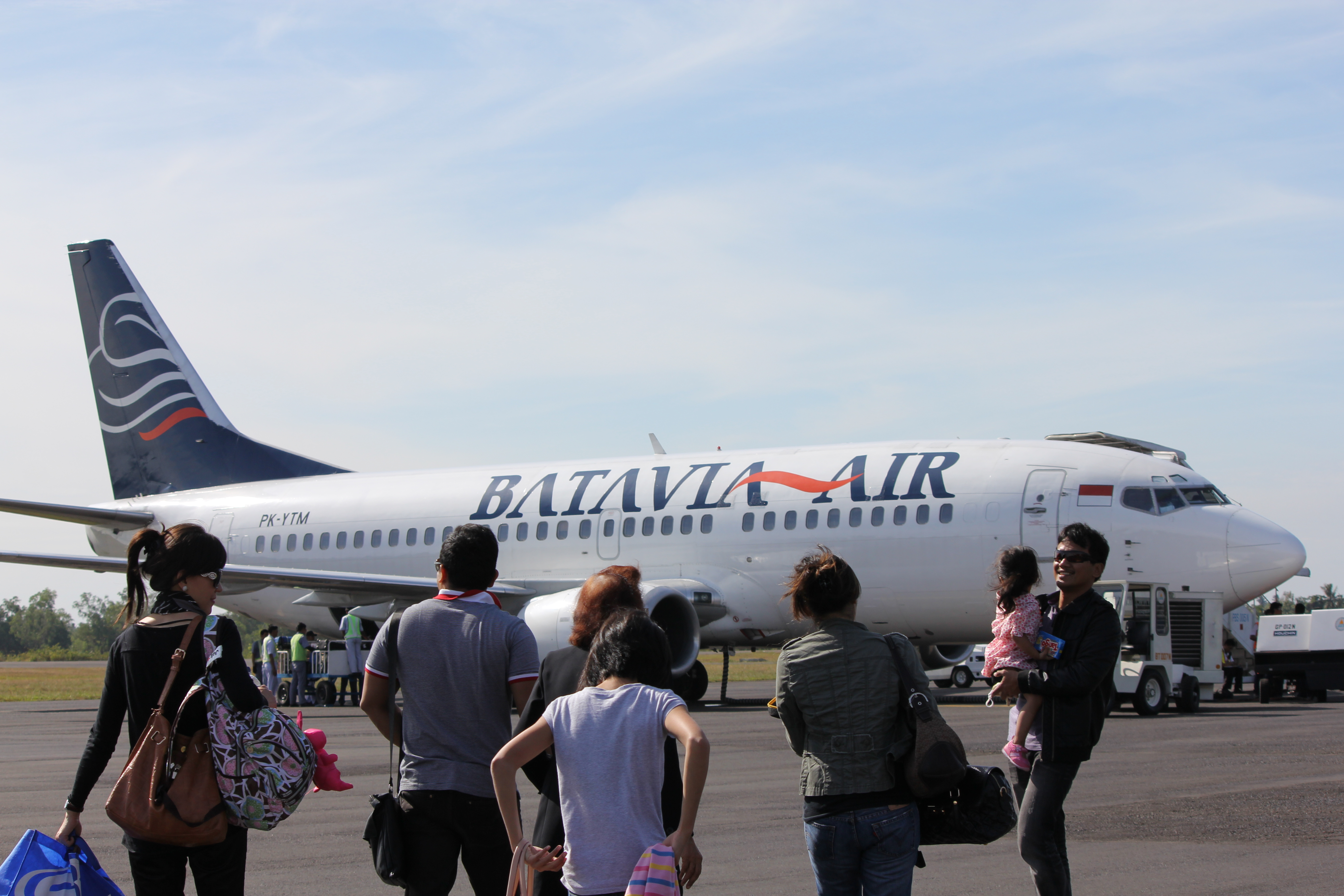
A Batavia Air Boeing 737-300 at Radin Inten II International Airport

Citilink Airbus A320 at Radin Inten II International Airport

Annual passenger numbers and aircraft statistics
Year	Passengers handled	Passenger % change	Cargo (tonnes)	Cargo % change	Aircraft movements	Aircraft % change
2006	177,758	Steady	102	Steady	1,977	Steady
2007	366,658	▲106.3	644	▲531.4	4,316	▲118.3
2008	379,040	▲3.4	655	▲1.7	4,516	▲4.6
2009	533,448	▲40.7	962	▲46.9	6,028	▲33.5
2010	719,350	▲34.8	1,038	▲7.9	6,442	▲6.9
2011	1,021,426	▲42.0	5,880	▲466.5	9,650	▲49.8
2012	1,200,666	▲17.5	3,939	▼33.0	10,113	▲4.8
2013	1,125,480	▼6.3	2,876	▼27.0	9,229	▼8.7
2014	1,234,845	▲9.7	3,727	▲29.6	9,768	▲5.8
2015	1,419,342	▲14.9	4,438	▲19.1	13,259	▲35.7
2016	1,882,703	▲32.6	4,888	▲10.1	18,161	▲37.0
2017	2,463,703	▲30.9	5,580	▲14.2	21,749	▲19.8
2018	2,643,225	▲7.3	5,923	▲6.1	20,635	▼5.1
2019	1,839,328	▼30.4	3,562	▼39.9	15,798	▼23.4
2020	570,429	▼69.0	1,558	▼56.3	7,831	▼50.4
2021	425,375	▼25.4	990	▼36.5	4,594	▼41.3
2022	687,625	▲61.7	1,101	▲11.2	5,647	▲22.9
2023	918,954	▲33.6	1,117	▲1.5	6,809	▲20.6
2024	1,171,283	▲27.5	1,726	▲54.5	8,472	▲24.4
^{Source: DGCA, BPS}

== Accidents and incidents ==
- On September 7, 1974, Garuda Indonesian Airways Flight 126, a domestic flight from Palembang via Tanjungkarang–Telukbetung to Jakarta operated by a Fokker F27-600 PK-GFJ 'Semeru', hit a building while attempting to go-around in heavy rain and strong winds. Of the 36 people on board, 33 were killed, including four crew members.
- On March 20, 1982, a Garuda Indonesian AIrways Fokker F28 PK-GVK 'Cimanuk' operating a scheduled passenger flight from Jakarta to Bandar Lampung overran the runway while landing at Branti Airport during heavy rainfall. The aircraft came to a stop approximately 700 metres beyond the runway in a field and subsequently caught fire. All occupants on board were killed in the accident.
- On June 2, 1983, a Garuda Indonesian Airways Fokker F28 PK-GFV 'Selegan' operating a scheduled passenger flight from Bandar Lampung to Jakarta overran the runway while take-off at Branti Airport. At takeoff from runway 14, the captain realized that one of the engine failed. The captain abandoned the takeoff procedure and landed back onto runway. Unable to stop within the remaining distance, the airplane overran, struck a concrete wall and crashed on a small hill located 138 meters past the runway end. Both pilot and a passenger were killed while 12 occupants were injured and 46 others escaped uninjured. The aircraft was damaged beyond repair.
- On November 26, 2017, Wings Air Flight 1286, an ATR 72-500 operating a domestic flight from Bandung to Bandar Lampung, experienced a tire burst upon landing at Radin Inten II Airport. No injuries were reported among the occupants.
- On December 20, 2020, Lion Air Flight 173, a Boeing 737-900ER operating a domestic flight from Batam to Bandar Lampung, skidded off the runway upon landing in heavy rain at Radin Inten II Airport. All 125 passengers and 7 crew members escaped without injury.

== See also ==
- List of airports in Indonesia
