= Karel Satsuit Tubun =

Police officer and National Hero of Indonesia

Karel Sadsuitubun
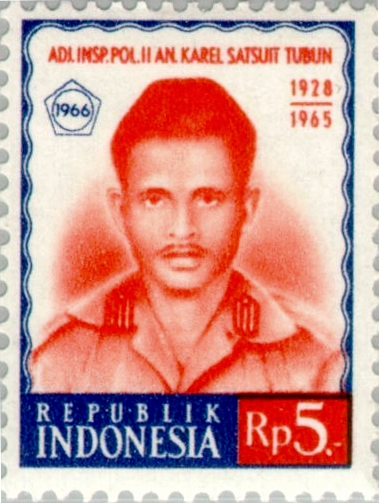
- A stamp of Karel, c. 1966

Personal details
- Born: Karel Sadsuitubun; 14 October 1928 Tual, Southeast Maluku, Dutch East Indies
- Died: 1 October 1965 (aged 36) Jakarta, Indonesia
- Cause of death: Shooting
- Spouse: Margaretha Waginah
- Children: 3
- Occupation: Police officer

Military service
- Allegiance: Indonesia
- Branch/service: Indonesian National Police
- Years of service: 1945–1965
- Rank: Police Second Sub-inspector (posthumously)
- Unit: Mobile Brigade Corps
- Awards: National Hero of Indonesia

Karel Sadsuitubun (also mistakenly written as Karel Satsuit Tubun; 14 October 1928 – 1 October 1965) was an Indonesian police officer and national hero. Serving as a bodyguard for deputy prime minister Johannes Leimena, he was fatally wounded in the line of duty in a firefight by communists during the 1965 coup d'état.

Karel Satsuit Tubun was born on 14 October 1928 in Tual, Southeast Maluku. He pursued a career as a police officer, participating in Operation Trikora, and after the transfer of West Irian, he was assigned as a bodyguard to Deputy Prime Minister Johannes Leimena and promoted to the rank of Police Brigadier. On 30 September 1965, communist rebels attempted a coup d'etat, aiming to kidnap and kill high-ranking military personnel, including Grand General Abdul Haris Nasution, who was in the house adjacent to Leimena's. During the chaos, Tubun woke up and attempted to shoot the rebels but was fatally shot.

The coup d'état ultimately failed, and in the aftermath, Tubun was declared a national hero. He was posthumously promoted to the rank of Police Second Sub-inspector. Among others, an Indonesian frigate known as the KRI Karel Satsuitubun (356) and an airport were named in his honor.
