= AYW =

AYW may refer to:

- A sub-type of Hepatitis B virus surface antigen
- Aberystwyth railway station (National Rail code: AYW), a railway station in the United Kingdom
- Ayawasi Airport (IATA code: AYW), an airport in Indonesia
