= Tayandu Islands =

Island group in Indonesia

Coordinates: 5°39′07″S 132°17′22″E

Native name: Kepulauan Tayandu
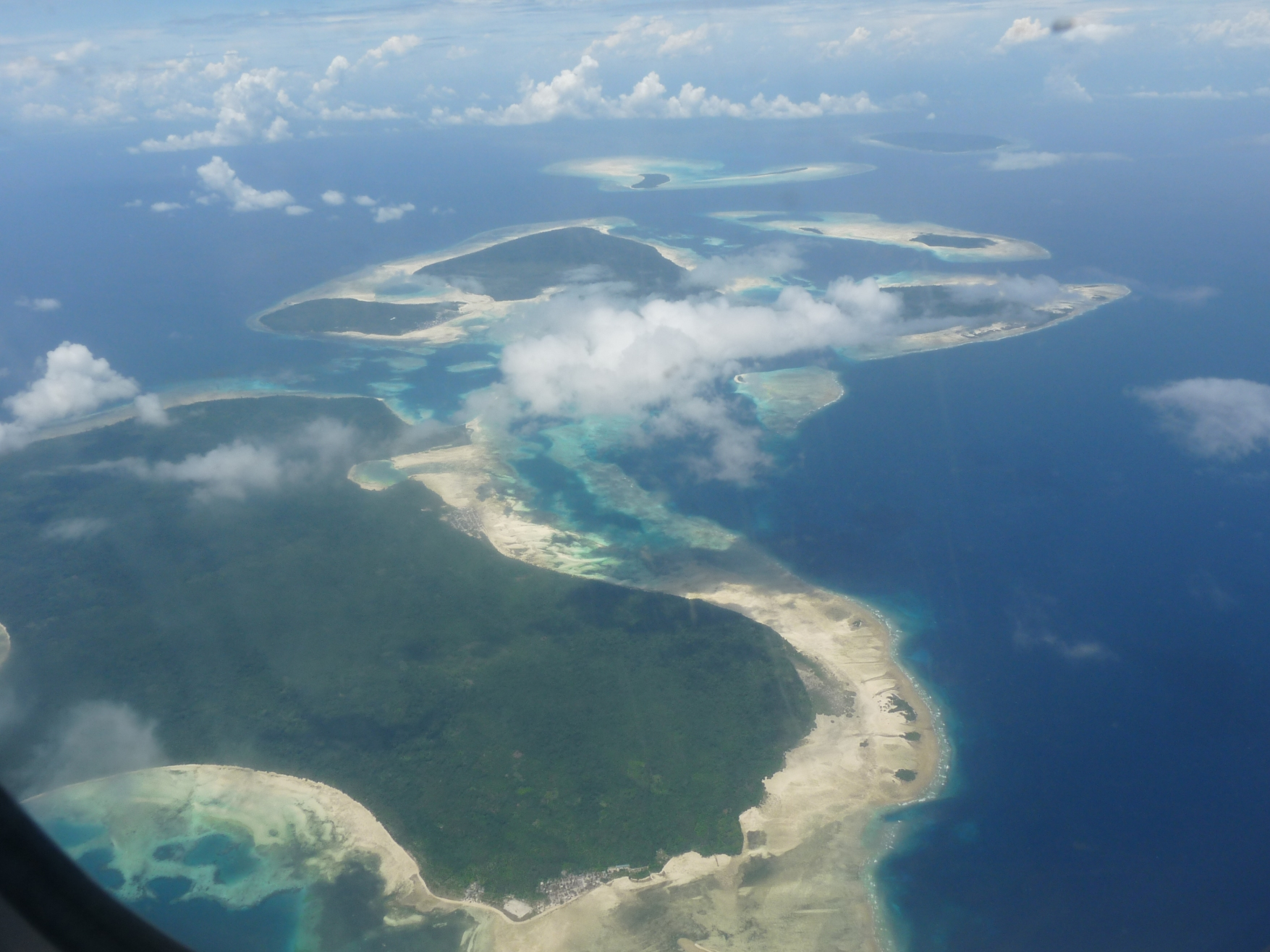
- View of the Tayando Islands as seen from the air while flying between the Kai Islands and Ambon. Tayando Island plus Yamru village is in the foreground, Walir Island plus smaller Heniar (with Yamtel village) in middle distance and Tam as the largest of the isles hazily visible at the top right in the far distance.
- Interactive map of Tayandu Islands

Geography
- Location: Southeast Asia
- Archipelago: Maluku Islands
- Major islands: Heniar, Tayando, Walir

Administration
- Indonesia
- Province: Maluku

Additional information
- Time zone: IEST (UTC+09:00)

The Tayandu or Tayando Islands (Indonesian: Kepulauan Tayando) are a group of low-lying islands just west of the larger Kai Islands of Maluku, Indonesia. The group of 27 islands consists of Tayando (with the villages of Yamru and Ohoiel), Walir, Heniar (with the village of Tayando Yamtel) and several smaller islets. Between Walir and Taam (further south) is Pulau Nusreen (5°42'14"S, 132°16'5"E) featuring a large sandy lagoon. Administratively, the group comprises a district (kecamatan) within the city of Tual. Further west lies Manggur Island with Kur and Kaimeer islands north of it, but these comprise two other districts (Pulau-pulau Kur and Kur Selatan) within the city, and are not within the Tayando Tam District.
