= Southeast Maluku Regency =

Regency in Maluku, Indonesia

Southeast Maluku Regency Kabupaten Maluku Tenggara
- Regency
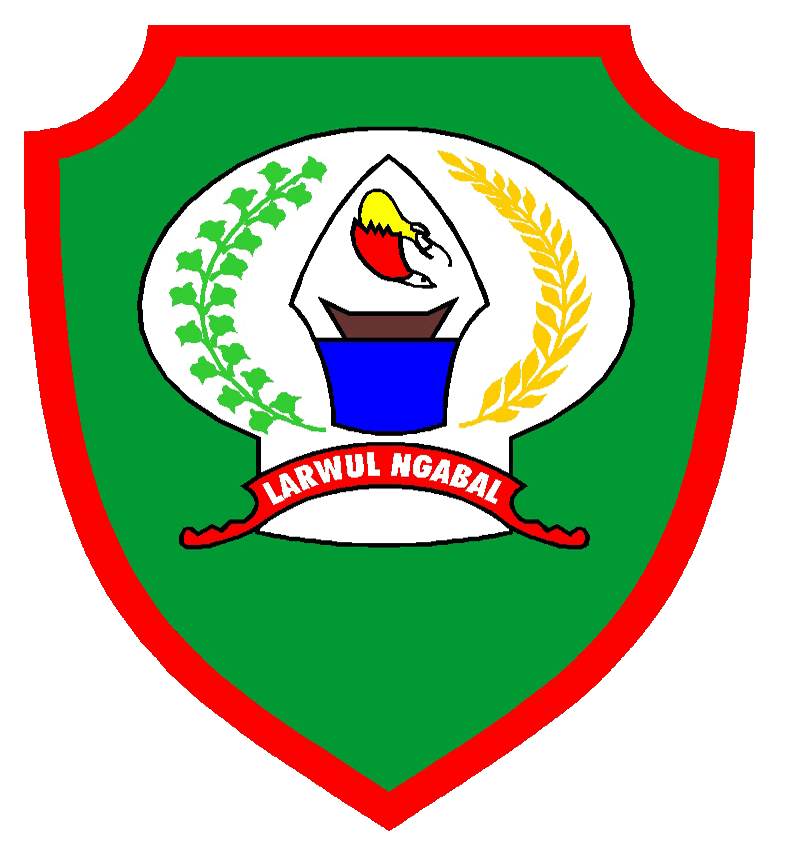
- Coat of arms
- Motto: Larvul Ngabal (The Red-Blooded Spear Originates from Bali)
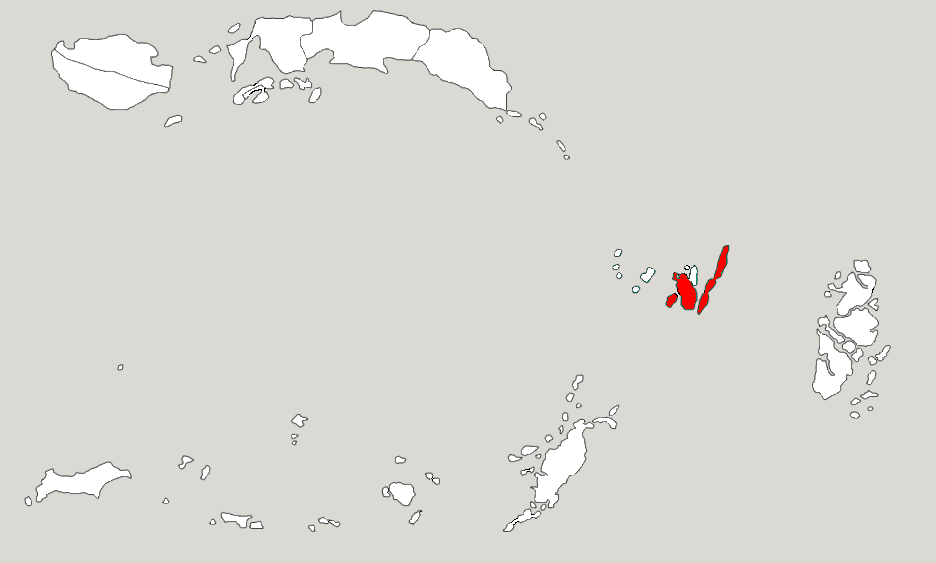
- Location within Maluku

- Location in Maluku and Indonesia Southeast Maluku Regency (Indonesia)
- Coordinates: 5.6548°S 132.7394°E
- Country: Indonesia
- Province: Maluku
- Capital: Langgur

Government
  - Regent: Muhammad Thaher Hanubun
  - Vice Regent: Carlos Viali Rahantoknam

Area
  - Total: 1,031.81 km^{2} (398.38 sq mi)

Population (mid 2024 estimate)
  - Total: 129,235
  - Density: 125.251/km^{2} (324.398/sq mi)
- Time zone: UTC+9 (IEST)
- Area code: (+62) 916
- Website: malukutenggarakab.go.id

Southeast Maluku Regency (Indonesian: Kabupaten Maluku Tenggara) is a regency of Maluku, Indonesia. It is coincident with the Kei Islands, excluding the independent city of Tual, The land area of the Regency is 1,031.81 km^{2}, while the sea area administered by the Regency was 3,181 km^{2}; it had a population of 96,442 at the 2010 Census; this increased to 121,511 at the 2020 Census, and the official estimate as at mid 2024 was 129,235.

== History ==
The Regency as originally created included all the southern island groups within Maluku (province) from Wetar Island in the west to the Aru Islands in the east. On 4 October 1999 the western part of this regency was split off to create the West Southeast Maluku Regency (which has subsequently been divided between the Southwest Maluku Regency and the Tanimbar Islands Regency). On 18 December 2003 the Aru Islands were split off to form their own Regency, and on 17 July 2007 the City of Tual was split off to become an independent city.

== Geography ==
The two principal islands of the Regency are Kei Besar (Greater Kei) in the east and the slightly smaller (excluding those parts of the island now in Tual City) but more densely populated Kei Kecil (Lesser Kei) in the west. The capital is located at Langgur on Kei Kecil. The third-largest island in the group, Dullah, on which the city of Tual is located, is no longer within the Regency.

Kei Besar is long, thin and mountainous. Kei Besar's topography varies between 500 and 800 metres above sea level, and differs from the islands to the west by having a karst formation in the middle of it. Kei Kecil (also called Nuhuroa) is more low-lying, not exceeding about 100 metres above sea level, and contains much swampland; the regency's nominal capital, Langgur, is situated in the north-east of the island, just across a tiny channel from Tual on Dullah Island, and effectively forms a suburb of the City of Tual.

About 50 smaller, forest-covered coral islands lie of the west coast of Kei Kecil; about 33 are part of Kei Kecil District, including Ngaf, Ohoitir, Ohouwa, Nai, Warhu, Hoat and Tangwain; about 16 are part of Kei Kecil Barat District, including Lik, Tarwa, Waha, Warbal, Manir, Ur, Witir, Nuhuta and (further south) Tanimbar Kei. Further groups of islands which lie more to the west (but geographically part of the Kei Islands) form part of Tual City - including the Tayando-Tam group of 27 islands and (even more to the west) the Kur group of 9 islands.

== Administrative districts ==
At the time of the 2010 Census the regency was divided into six districts (kecamatan), but by 2016 five additional districts had been created by the division of the existing districts. These are tabulated below with their land and sea areas and their populations at the 2010 Census and the 2020 Census, together with the official estimates as at mid 2024. The table also includes the locations of the district administrative centres, the number of administrative villages in each district (a total of 185 rural desa and 6 urban kelurahan), and its postal code.

Kode Wilayah	Name of District (kecamatan)	English name	Land area in km^{2}	Sea area in km^{2}	Pop'n Census 2010	Pop'n Census 2020	Pop'n Estimate mid 2024	Admin centre	No. of villages	Post code
81.02.01	Kei Kecil ^{(a)}	Lesser Kei	109.27	283.23	40,336	33,987	34,573	Langgur	15	97622
81.02.14	Kei Kecil Barat ^{(b)}	West Lesser Kei	95.76	870.27	5,728	7,601	7,859	Ohoira	10	97624
81.02.13	Kei Kecil Timur ^{(c)}	East Lesser Kei	68.26	85.81	10,674	8,205	9,133	Rumat	18	97625
81.02.16	Hoat Sorbay		82.28	22.62	^{(d)}	10,139	10,832	Tetoat	13	97621
81.02.15	Manyeuw		61.93	231.93	^{(d)}	6,256	6,309	Rumahdian	9	97623
81.02.19	Kei Kecil Timur Selatan	Southeast; Lesser Kei	55.48	125.49	^{(e)}	5,683	5,796	Danar Ternate	11	97626
	Total Kei Kecil	Lesser Kei	472.98	1,419.35	56,738	71,871	74,502		76	
81.02.03	Kei Besar ^{(f)}	Greater Kei	112.97	371.21	22,489	18,818	19,897	Elat	37	97631
81.02.05	Kei Besar Utara Timur ^{(g)}	Northeast; Greater Kei	167.09	351.62	9,626	11,289	13,346	Hollat	30	97635
81.02.04	Kei Besar Selatan ^{(h)}	South Greater Kei	78.83	325.32	7,589	6,916	7,207	Weduar	10	97632
81.02.17	Kei Besar Utara Barat	Northwest; Greater Kei	157.81	353.55	^{(i)}	9,131	10,388	Uwat Reyaan	25	97634
81.02.18	Kei Besar Selatan Barat	Southwest; Greater Kei	42.13	159.68	^{(j)}	3,486	3,895	Rahangiar	13	97633
	Total Kei Besar	Greater Kei	558.83	1,561.38	39,704	49,640	54,733		115	

Notes: (a) includes 33 offshore islands. The town of Langgur (the Regency's nominal capital) comprises more than half the population of this district. (b) includes 16 offshore islands.
(c) includes 2 offshore islands. (d) the 2010 population of Hoat Sorbay and Manyeuw Districts were included in the figure for Kei Kecil District, from which they were split off.
(e) the 2010 population of Kei Kecil Timur Selatan District was included in the figure for Kei Kecil Timur District, from which it was split off. (f) includes 10 offshore islands.
(g) includes 3 offshore islands. (h) includes 8 offshore islands. (i) the 2010 population of Kei Besar Utara Barat District was included in the figure for Kei Besar District, from which it was split off.
(j) the 2010 population of Kei Besar Selatan Barat District was included in the figure for Kei Besar Selatan District, from which it was split off.

== Transport ==
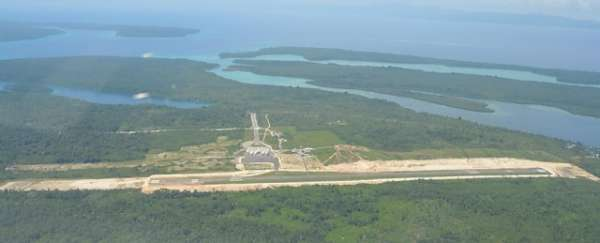
Aerial view of Dumatubun Airport at Langgur

A small airport named Dumatubun Airport is located at Langgur in Kei Kecil District. However this was replaced for civilian use in 2014 by a new Karel Sadsuitubun Airport, much to the south in Kei Kecil Island, and Dumatubun Airport is now used only for the Indonesian Air Force.

== Climate ==
Langgur, the seat of the regency has a tropical rainforest climate (Af) with moderate rainfall from July to October and heavy to very heavy rainfall from November to June.

Climate data for Langgur
Month	Jan	Feb	Mar	Apr	May	Jun	Jul	Aug	Sep	Oct	Nov	Dec	Year
Mean daily maximum °C (°F)	30.0 (86.0)	30.0 (86.0)	30.3 (86.5)	30.9 (87.6)	30.7 (87.3)	29.7 (85.5)	29.2 (84.6)	29.6 (85.3)	30.8 (87.4)	31.5 (88.7)	31.7 (89.1)	30.8 (87.4)	30.4 (86.8)
Daily mean °C (°F)	27.2 (81.0)	27.3 (81.1)	27.3 (81.1)	27.7 (81.9)	27.6 (81.7)	26.8 (80.2)	26.1 (79.0)	26.3 (79.3)	27.1 (80.8)	27.8 (82.0)	28.1 (82.6)	27.6 (81.7)	27.2 (81.0)
Mean daily minimum °C (°F)	24.5 (76.1)	24.6 (76.3)	24.4 (75.9)	24.5 (76.1)	24.5 (76.1)	24.0 (75.2)	23.1 (73.6)	23.1 (73.6)	23.4 (74.1)	24.1 (75.4)	24.6 (76.3)	24.5 (76.1)	24.1 (75.4)
Average rainfall mm (inches)	394 (15.5)	338 (13.3)	349 (13.7)	275 (10.8)	237 (9.3)	154 (6.1)	101 (4.0)	72 (2.8)	66 (2.6)	75 (3.0)	162 (6.4)	332 (13.1)	2,555 (100.6)
Source: Climate-Data.org

== Riots ==
On 6 October and 12 November 2022, there were riots between the Elat village and Bombai village. The second riot that occurred on 12 November killed two people and injured dozens of civilians and two policemen.
