= Akhmad Yani Renuat =

Mayor of Tual
- Incumbent
- Assumed office 20 February 2025
- Preceded by: Adam Rahayaan

Personal details
- Born: 10 October 1967 (age 58) Tual, Maluku, Indonesia

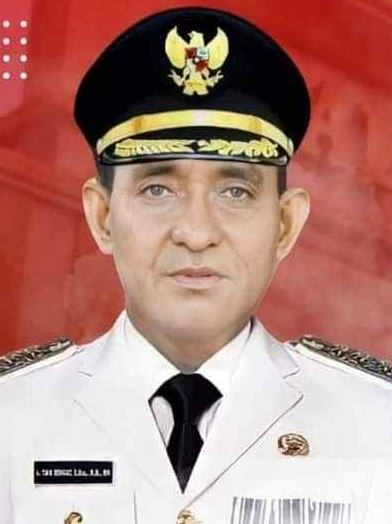

Akhmad Yani Renuat (born 10 October 1967) is an Indonesian politician and former civil servant who has been the mayor of Tual, Maluku since February 2025. He had previously worked in Tual's municipal government between 2009 and 2023, and had been the city's acting mayor between 2023 and 2024.

== Early life ==
Akhmad Yani Renuat was born in the Ohoi (village) of Dullah, within present-day Tual city, on 10 October 1967. After completing elementary school there in 1980, he completed middle school and high school in Tual proper. After completing high school in 1986, he moved to Ambon and worked odd jobs there including selling street food and doing construction work.

== Career ==
In 1989, Renuat was accepted as a civil servant and began to work for the provincial government of Maluku. He received a government scholarship, and obtained his bachelor's degree in 1996. He obtained another scholarship from the provincial government in 2005 and received a master's in public administration from Gadjah Mada University in 2007. During this period, he worked within the human resources department of the provincial government.

Renuat was assigned to head the human resources department of Tual in 2009 and remained in the position until 2019. In 2020, he was promoted to become the Regional Secretary of the city on 20 July 2019. On 31 October 2023, when the term of Tual's mayor Adam Rahayaan expired, Renuat was appointed as acting mayor. He resigned from this post in July 2024 in order to run as mayor in the city's 2024 election. Renuat was endorsed by PKS, Perindo, and Golkar. In the four-way election, Renuat won with 14,157 votes (40.2%). He was sworn in as mayor on 20 February 2025.
