= Karel Sadsuitubun Airport =

Karel Sadsuitubun Airport Bandar Udara Karel Sadsuitubun
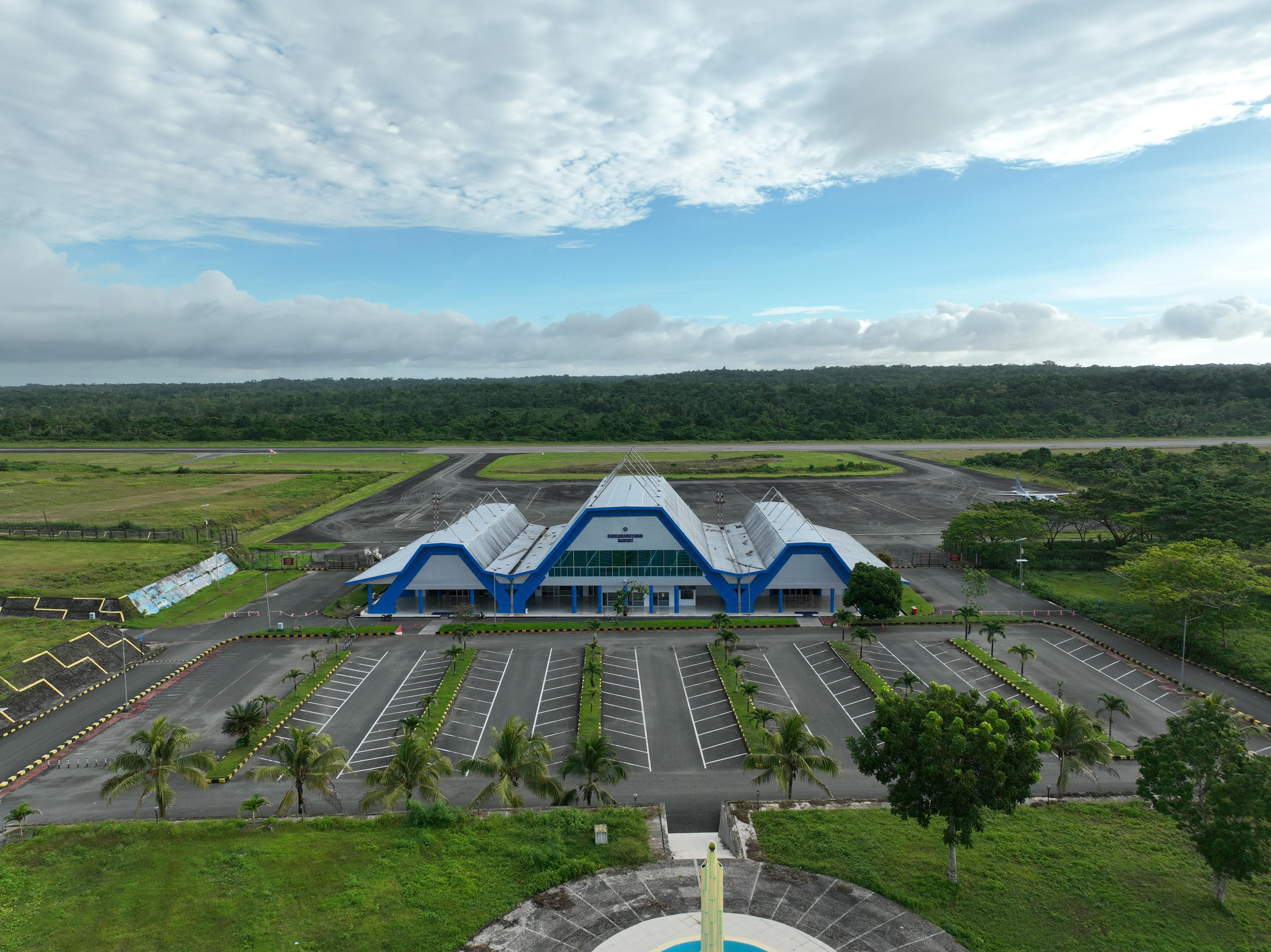
- IATA: LUV; ICAO: WAPF

Summary
- Airport type: Public
- Owner: Government of Indonesia
- Operator: Directorate General of Civil Aviation
- Serves: Langgur and Tual
- Location: Ibra, Kai Islands, Maluku, Indonesia
- Time zone: WIT (UTC+09:00)
- Elevation AMSL: 33 ft / 24 m
- Coordinates: 5°45′37″S 132°45′34″E

Map
- Location of airport in Maluku

Runways
Direction	Length		Surface
Direction	ft	m	Surface
13/31	7,710	2,350	Asphalt

Statistics (2024)
- Passengers: 102,408 (▲9.01%)
- Cargo (tonnes): 186.98 (▼7.93%)
- Aircraft movements: 1,461 (▲0.76%)
- Source: DGCA

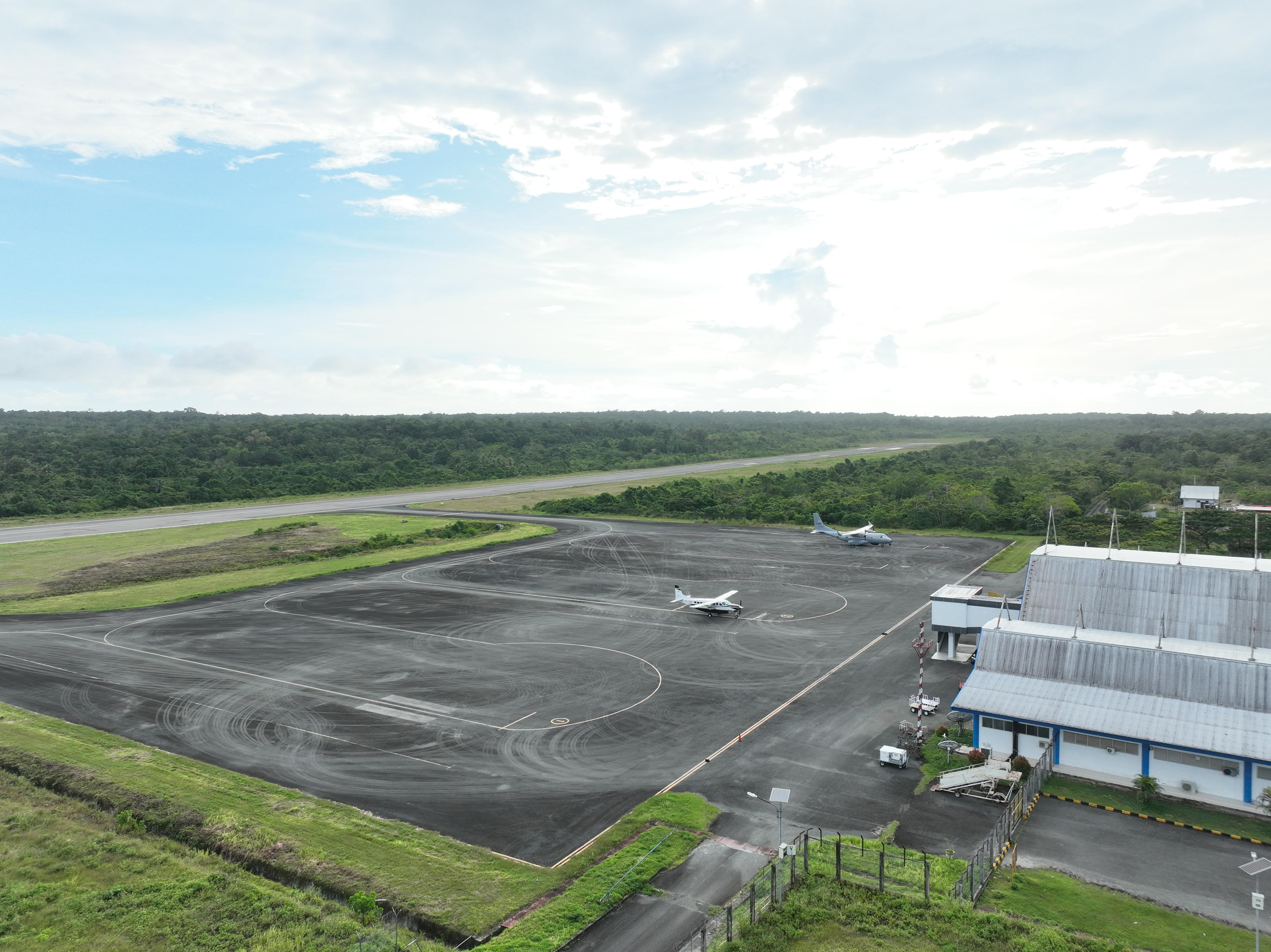
Apron view

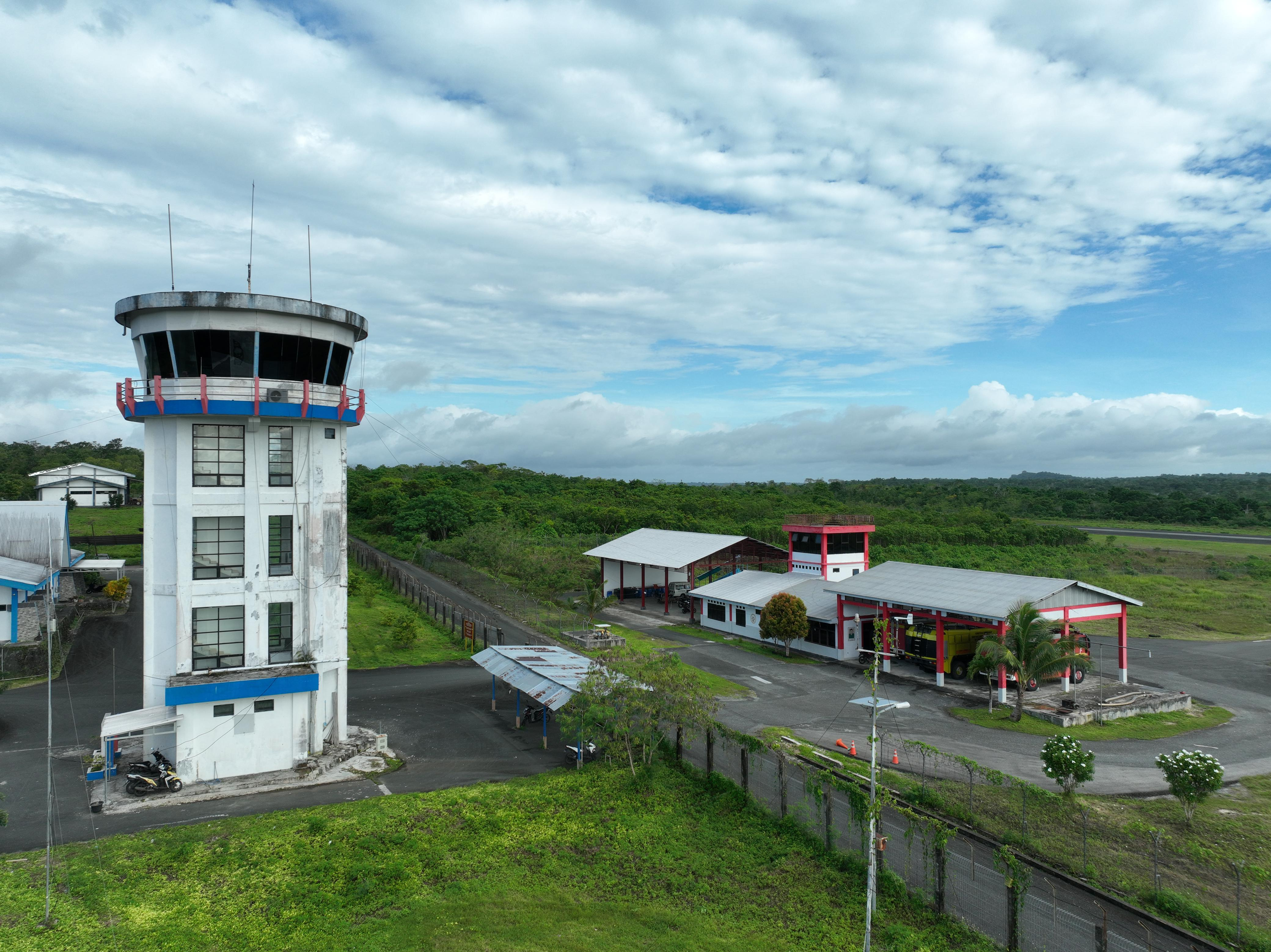
ATC tower

Karel Sadsuitubun Airport (IATA: LUV, ICAO: WAPF) is a domestic airport located in Ibra, Southeast Maluku Regency, Kai Islands, Maluku, Indonesia. It serves the town of Langgur, the regency seat, as well as the nearby city of Tual. The airport is named after Karel Satsuit Tubun (1928–1965), a police officer from Tual who was killed during the attempted coup by the Indonesian Communist Party on 30 September 1965 and is recognized as a National Hero of Indonesia. The airport replaced the former Dumatubun Airport, which was located in the center of Langgur and is now used exclusively by the Indonesian Air Force. Karel Sadsuitubun Airport is situated approximately 12 km (7.5 miles) from Langgur and 14 km (8.7 miles) from Tual. It serves as the main gateway to the Kai Islands, with scheduled flights to Ambon, the provincial capital of Maluku, operated by Lion Air and Wings Air, as well as pioneer routes to Larat and Timika, operated by Smart Aviation.

== History ==
Dumatubun Airport, the former principal airport of the Kai Islands, which had been in operation since the Japanese occupation during World War II, was deemed no longer viable for continued use, primarily because its 1,300-metre runway could not be extended. Due to its short runway, Dumatubun Airport can only accommodate smaller aircraft such as the CASA C-212 Aviocar, Fokker 27, and ATR 42. Furthermore, the airport is located in the middle of Langgur’s town center and is surrounded by residential areas, limiting any further expansion. Consequently, the construction of a new, larger airport was proposed. Construction of the new airport began in 2006 on a 5,000 m × 2,000 m site spanning two villages, Ibra and Sathean, located approximately 15 km from Dumatubun Airport. After significant delays—mainly due to land clearing issues, particularly disputes over compensation with landowners—the airport was completed in 2013. The inauguration and commencement of operations at the airport were postponed multiple times due to unresolved land ownership disputes with local residents, to the extent that landowners and residents blocked access to the airport, claiming that the local government had not fully paid the compensation agreed upon in the original agreement.

The airport began operations on 24 February 2014, marked by the first landing of a Trigana Air aircraft. It was finally inaugurated by the then Minister of Transportation, Ignasius Jonan, on 19 December 2014. The inauguration was held simultaneously with the opening of 20 ports and 10 airports across Indonesia. Following the opening of the new airport, all flights to and from Dumatubun Airport were transferred there, with Dumatubun subsequently serving primarily as an Indonesian Air Force base.

In 2016, an Indonesian Air Force Boeing 737-200 landed at the airport as part of testing to verify its capability to handle such aircraft, marking the first time a Boeing 737 had landed at the airport. The following year, Sriwijaya Air became the first airline to operate a Boeing 737 on a commercial flight to the airport, using a Boeing 737-500 as part of the launch of the Langgur–Makassar route. In 2022, Lion Air launched the Langgur–Ambon route using a Boeing 737-800.

== Facilities and development ==
The airport originally had a runway measuring 1,650 m × 30 m, which initially could only accommodate aircraft such as the ATR-72. To support larger narrow-body aircraft, including the Boeing 737, Fokker 100, and Airbus A320, the runway was extended to 2,100 m in 2015 and further lengthened to 2,350 m later that same year. The expansion also included widening the apron and constructing an additional taxiway, with the runway extension costing approximately Rp 9 billion and the new taxiway about Rp 11 billion. Following the expansion, the airport has a single apron measuring 208 m × 124 m and two taxiways, each measuring 132 m × 23 m. There are plans to further extend the runway to 2,500 m in the future. Navigation facilities are also planned to be upgraded to enable night landings and takeoffs at the airport.

On the landside, it features a single terminal building with an area of 3,694 m², including a departure lounge of 876 m² and an arrival lounge of 1,079 m². The terminal is capable of accommodating 50,000 passengers annually.

== Airlines and destinations ==
The following destinations are served from Karel Sadsuitubun Airport:

Airlines	Destinations
Lion Air	Ambon
Smart Aviation	Larat, Timika
Wings Air	Ambon

== Statistics ==
Annual passenger numbers and aircraft statistics
Year	Passengers handled	Passenger % change	Cargo (tonnes)	Cargo % change	Aircraft movements	Aircraft % change
2006	32,015	Steady	8.01	Steady	N/A	Steady
2007	65,640	▲105.03	251.5	▲3039.83	2,324	Steady
2008	34,269	▼47.79	24.65	▼90.20	1,250	▼46.21
2009	53,119	▲55.01	26.8	▲8.72	1,642	▲31.36
2010	94,271	▲77.47	99.18	▲270.07	3,145	▲91.53
2011	120,673	▲28.01	108.06	▲8.95	2,714	▼13.70
2012	87,350	▼27.61	86.68	▼19.79	2,520	▼7.15
2013	114,917	▲31.56	63.87	▼26.32	3,006	▲19.29
2014	124,203	▲8.08	181.81	▲184.66	2,560	▼14.84
2015	139,465	▲12.29	347.37	▲91.06	4,363	▲70.43
2016	122,600	▼12.09	289.88	▼16.55	3,319	▼23.93
2017	123,021	▲0.34	349.76	▲20.66	3,110	▼6.30
2018	141,054	▲14.66	474.43	▲35.64	3,446	▲10.80
2019	89,326	▼36.67	270.56	▼42.97	2,551	▼25.97
2020	43,884	▼50.87	151.03	▼44.18	1,393	▼45.39
2021	73,082	▲66.53	226.4	▲49.90	1,926	▲38.26
2022	97,458	▲33.35	244.48	▲7.99	2,009	▲4.31
2023	93,942	▼3.61	203.08	▼16.93	1,450	▼27.82
2024	102,408	▲9.01	186.98	▼7.93	1,461	▲0.76
^{Source: DGCA, BPS}

Notes: Data prior to 2014 are derived from records of Dumatubun Airport.
