= Kur Island =

Kur Island Pulau-Pulau Kur
- District
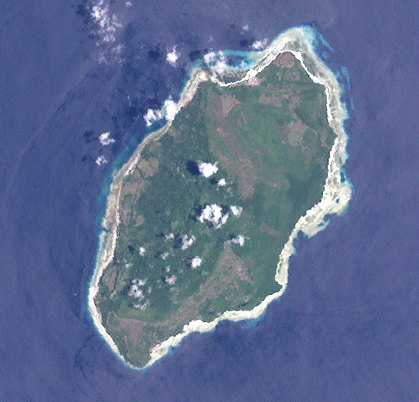
- Landsat 7 photograph of Kur

- Location in Maluku Islands Location in Indonesia
- Coordinates: 5.344°S 131.993°E
- Country: Indonesia
- Province: Maluku
- City: Tual

Government
  - Head of district: Lajania Madamar

Area
  - Total: 26.69 km^{2} (10.31 sq mi)

Population (mid 2023 estimate)
  - Total: 5,003
  - Density: 187/km^{2} (480/sq mi)
- Time zone: UTC+9 (IEST)
- Postcode: 97615
- Area code: (+62) 916
- Villages: 5

Kur is an island of Indonesia, located to the northwest of the Kei Islands but forming (with other small islands further north and south of Kur Island) two administrative districts (kecamatan) - Pulau-Pulau Kur and Kur Selatan - which are part of the City of Tual in Maluku province. While administered as part of Tual city, Kur and its neighbouring islands geographically lie along the underseas ridge which continues the outer arc from the Babar Islands and Tanimbar Islands through to the Watubela Islands, Gorong Islands and then on to Seram. The island itself has an area of 26.69 km^{2} with 5,003 inhabitants as at mid 2023, while the other islands within the two districts had an area of 21.64 km^{2} with 1,804 inhabitants (all on Mangur and Kaimear islands) in mid 2023.

== Administrative villages ==
Kur Island contains 9 villages (desa) within the two districts. Finualen, Tubyal, Lokwirin and Sermaf villages in the north half of the island are within Pulau-Pulau Kur District, with an area of 14.23 km^{2} and 2,156 inhabitants in mid 2023. Kanara, Warkar, Yapas, Romoin and Hirit villages in the south half of the island are within Kur Selatan District, with an area of 12.46 km^{2} and 2,847 inhabitants in mid 2023.

In addition, Pulau-Pulau Kur District includes a fifth village - Kaimear - on the island of the same name, with 709 inhabitants in mid 2023. Kanos and Bui islands even further north are uninhabited. Kur Selatan District includes two further villages on Mangur Island - Niela with 632 inhabitants in mid 2023, and Tiflean with 463 inhabitants in mid 2023.
