= Ayawasi =

- village
- Location in Southwest Papua Location in Western New Guinea Location in Indonesia
- Coordinates: 1.160°S 132.464°E
- Country: Indonesia
- Province: Southwest Papua
- Regency: Maybrat
- District: North Aifat
- Established: c. 1953
- Elevation: 450 m (1,480 ft)

Population (2007)
  - Total: c. 1,200
- Time zone: UTC+9 (Indonesia Eastern Time)

Ayawasi is a small village part of a larger settlement of about 1,200 people in the Indonesia province of Southwest Papua. It is located in the North Aifat District, north of the Ayamaru Lakes, in Maybrat Regency and it is the site of Ayawasi Airport.

The village was established by the Dutch around 1953. Prior to this, the people of this area lived scattered in small groups in their respective ancestral grounds, where each group had its own "family dialect" differing in small ways from the dialect of the other groups. As of the 1990s, around 95% of the population are indigenous Maybrat (more specifically Aifat people), the rest have come from other parts of Indonesia to work in the schools, government offices and the Catholic mission. The Aifat people of Ayawasi are fully bilingual in Maybrat and Indonesian. The Maybrat language spoken in Ayawasi has been the subject of a 2007 descriptive grammar, and a major ethnographic study on the people was conducted in the 1970s.

== Bibliography ==
- Dol, Philomena Hedwig (1998). "Form and function of demonstratives in Maybrat". Perspectives on the bird's head of Irian Jaya, Indonesia: proceedings of a conference Leiden, 13 - 17 October 1997. Jelle Miedema et al. (eds.). Amsterdam: Rodopi. pp. 535–553. ISBN 978-90-420-0644-7.
- Dol, Philomena Hedwig (2007). A grammar of Maybrat : A language of the Bird's Head Peninsula, Papua province, Indonesia. Pacific Linguistics. Canberra: Australian National University. ISBN 978-0-85883-573-3.
- Schoorl, Johannes Maria (1979). Mensen van de Ayfat : ceremoniële ruil en sociale orde in Irian Jaya-Indonesia (PhD) (in Dutch). Nijmegen.
