= Dominicus Dumatubun Air Force Base =

Coordinates: 05°39′41″S 132°43′53″E

- Pangkalan TNI Angkatan Udara Dominicus Dumatubun
- Maluku Tenggara Regency, Maluku in Indonesia
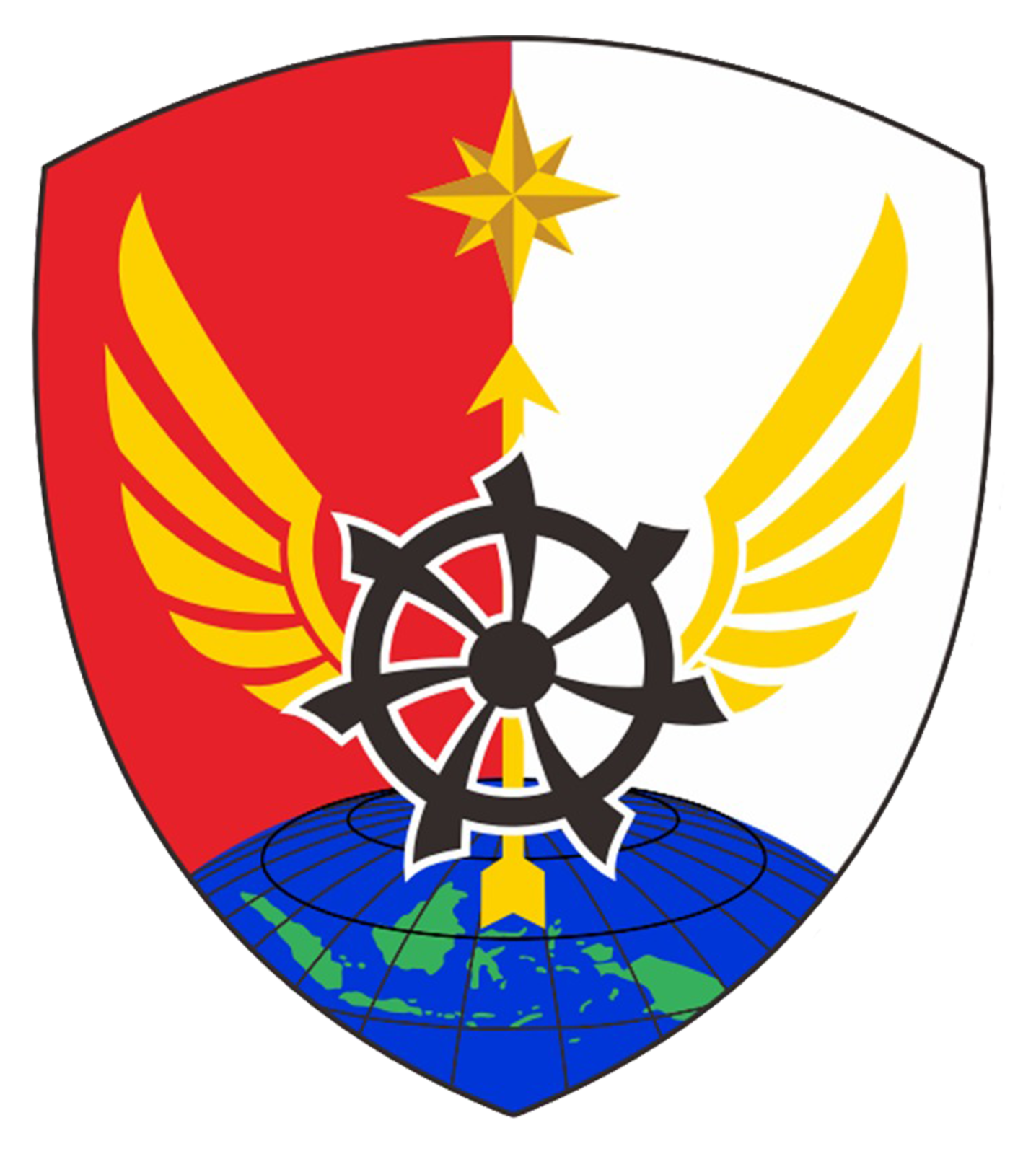
- Air Force Base emblem

Site information
- Type: Air Force base
- Owner: Government of Indonesia
- Operator: Indonesian Air Force
- Controlled by: Indonesian Air Force
- Condition: Operational

Location
- Location in Maluku Lanud Dominicus Dumatubun (Indonesia)

Site history
- In use: 1951–present

Airfield information
- Identifiers: IATA: ~~LUV~~, ICAO: WAPL
- Elevation: 3 metres (10 ft) AMSL
Runways
Direction	Length and surface
09/27	1,300 metres (4,265 ft) Concrete
- Runway data from World Aero Data (2006).

Dominicus Dumatubun Air Force Base (Indonesian: Pangkalan TNI Angkatan Udara Dominicus Dumatubun) is an Indonesian Air Force base located in Langgur, Maluku Tenggara Regency, Maluku, Indonesia. The base is operated by the Indonesian Air Force and is part of Air Operations Command III. The base shares its location with the former Dumatubun Airport, which handled civilian air traffic until the opening of Karel Sadsuitubun Airport in December 2014.

== History ==
The origins of the air base date to the Japanese occupation of the Kai Islands during World War II. After arriving on Kai Kecil in July 1942, Japanese forces constructed several airfields in the area, including Langgur, Faan, Letwuan, and Dullah Laut, which were used as defensive bases until the end of the war.

Following the establishment of Maluku Tenggara Regency in 1951, the Indonesian Air Force (Tentara Nasional Indonesia Angkatan Udara, TNI-AU) evaluated the former Japanese airfields in the region for military use. In December 1951, Captain Noerzain inspected the available sites and selected Langgur Airfield because of its proximity to Tual, the regency capital. Reconstruction work began in January 1952, and on 1 March that year the airfield was formally handed over to the TNI-AU. At the time, the airfield had a 1,300-metre (4,300 ft) runway and was administered as a subordinate unit of Laha Air Base in Ambon.

In 1957, the airfield became Air Force Detachment Langgur (Detasemen Angkatan Udara Langgur). As preparations for Operation Trikora intensified, the TNI-AU reopened Letwuan Airfield, a former Japanese airfield located west of Langgur. The two airfields subsequently operated together as Detachment Letwuan/Langgur.

During Operation Trikora, Langgur and Letwuan served as forward air bases supporting operations for the annexation of Dutch New Guinea. Aircraft deployed to the area included North American P-51 Mustang fighters; North American B-25 Mitchell bombers; Consolidated PBY Catalina and Grumman UF-1 Albatross amphibious aircraft; and Douglas C-47 Skytrain and Lockheed C-130 Hercules transports.

On 29 June 1962, a reconnaissance mission was conducted over waters near Tual, Langgur, and Letvuan. During the operation, a P-51 Mustang piloted by Air Captain Gunadi crashed shortly after takeoff from Langgur Airfield when it struck a hill near the end of the runway. Gunadi was killed in the accident. A monument in his memory was later installed at the airfield.

On 18 November 1969, following the transfer of West New Guinea to Indonesia in 1962, the base was renamed Dominicus Dumatubun Air Force Base following a decision by the Chief of Staff of the Air Force. The name commemorates Second Lieutenant Dominicus Dumatubun, a native of Langgur who died during a night training flight on 22 May 1960. The proposal to rename the base had originally been submitted by the Maluku Tenggara Regency legislature earlier that year.

On 9 May 2018, the base was transferred from Air Operations Command II to Air Operations Command III and was upgraded from a Type D to a Type C air base.

The airfield also served civil aviation until non-military flights were transferred to the newly opened Karel Sadsuitubun Airport on 19 December 2014.

== Bibliography ==
1. Djati, Poengky Poernomo (1996). Perjuangan AURI dalam Trikora. Jakarta: Markas Besar TNI Angkatan Udara.
2. Irawan, Sonny (2019). Warisan Perjuangan | Pangkalan TNI AU D. Dumatubun. GMB-Indonesia. ISBN 978-602-476-311-4.
3. Suyitno (1989). Sejarah Pangkalan TNI AU Dumatubun dan Pangkalan TNI AU Letfuan. Lanud Dumatubun.
