= Sei Pakning Airport =

- IATA: SEQ; ICAO: WIBS

Summary
- Airport type: Private
- Serves: Sungai Pakning
- Location: Sungai Pakning, Bengkalis Regency, Riau Province, Indonesia
- Elevation AMSL: 12 ft / 4 m
- Coordinates: 01°22′11″N 102°08′24″E

Maps
- Sumatra region in Indonesia

- Location of airport in Sumatra

Runways
Direction	Length		Surface
Direction	m	ft	Surface
18/36	800	2,625	Asphalt
- Sources: iata.org, Google Maps

Sei Pakning Airport or Sei Selari Airport (IATA: SEQ, ICAO: WIBS) is a domestic airport located in Sungai Pakning, Bengkalis Regency, Riau Province, Indonesia. It serves the town of Sungai Pakning. The airport served charter flights for Pertamina. Currently, there are no flights to and from this airport.
