= Sungai Pakning =

Coordinates: 01°20′58.9″N 102°09′10.7″E

Sungai Pakning is the central town of Bukit Batu, Bengkalis, Indonesia. Sei Pakning Airport is no longer in operation. The populants usually travel to and fro Bengkalis via local ferry service at Pelabuhan Roro Sungai Pakning.

There is only one local wet market in Sungai Pakning. However, the market only opens on certain days.
