= Radin Inten II =

Indonesian national hero

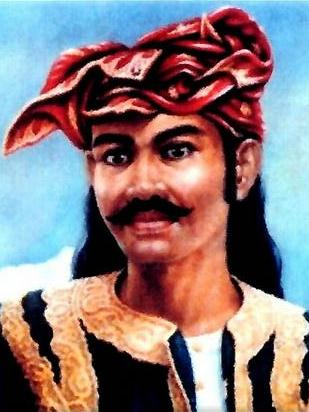
- Born: 1834; Kuripan, Lampung, Dutch East Indies
- Died: October 5, 1856 (aged 21–22); Negara Ratu, Lampung, Dutch East Indies
- Cause of death: Killed in battle by Radin Ngerapat and Dutch soldiers
- Burial place: Gedungharta Village Cemetery, Penengahan District, South Lampung
- Parent(s): Radin Imba Kusuma (father); Ratu Mas (mother)

Radin Inten II (1 January 1834 – 5 October 1858) is regarded as a National Hero of Indonesia. The Radin Inten II International Airport in Bandar Lampung is named after him. For his actions, he was awarded the title "Kesuma Bangsa".
