= Ayawasi Airport =

- IATA: AYW; ICAO: WASA

Summary
- Location: Ayawasi, Indonesia
- Elevation AMSL: 1,800 ft / 549 m
- Coordinates: 1°09′35″S 132°27′55″E

Map
- Location in Southwest Papua Location in Indonesia

Runways
Direction	Length		Surface
Direction	ft	m	Surface
09/27	2,723	830	Asphalt

Ayawasi Airport (IATA: AYW, ICAO: WASA) is an airport in the village of Ayawasi, North Aifat District, Maybrat Regency in the Indonesian province of Southwest Papua.
