= Gatot Subroto Airport =

Gatot Soebroto Airport Bandar Udara Gatot Soebroto
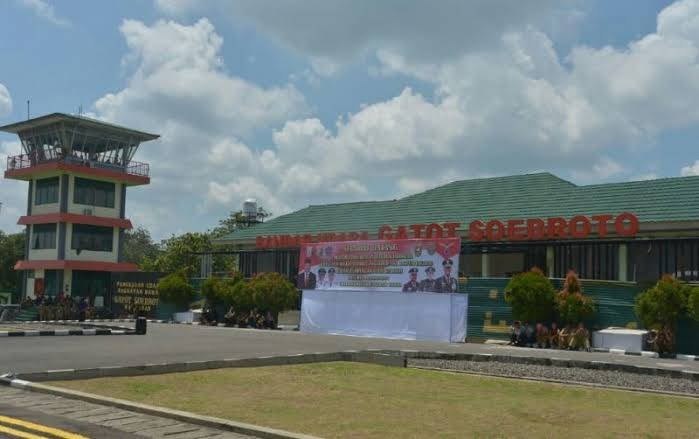
- IATA: WTX; ICAO: WIPO

Summary
- Airport type: Public / Military
- Owner/Operator: Lampung Provincial Government
- Time zone: WIB (UTC+07:00)
- Elevation AMSL: 450 ft (140 m)
- Coordinates: 04°23′30″S 104°24′05″E
- Interactive map of Gatot Soebroto Airport

Runways
Direction	Length		Surface
Direction	ft	m	Surface
03/21	6,890	2,100	Ashpalt

Gatot Soebroto Army Airfield
- Pangkalan Udara Angkatan Darat (Lanudad) Gatot Soebroto
- Way Kanan
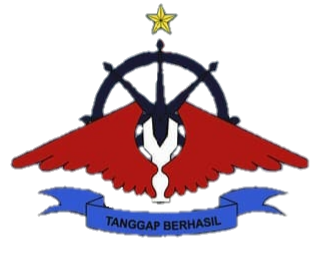

Site information
- Type: Army Airfield
- Owner: Indonesian Army

Gatot Soebroto Airport is an airport located in Way Tuba, Way Kanan Regency, Lampung Province, Indonesia. The airports runway measures 2,100 by 45 meters (6,890 ft × 148 ft) with an asphalt surface and a height of 137 meters above ground level. Gatot Subroto Airport is an Indonesian Army air base, and is the headquarters of Squadron 12/Serbu

== Proposed name change ==
After being inaugurated by the Minister of Transportation (Menhub) Budi Karya Sumadi and the Chief of Staff of the Army (KSAD) General TNI Andika Perkasa, on April 6, 2019. The Lampung Provincial Government (Pemprov) proposed changing the name of Gatot Subroto Airport (Bandara) Way Kanan. Acting Head of the Lampung Province Transportation Agency (Dishub) Bambang Sembogo said that this proposal was submitted by the Governor of Lampung, Arinal Djunaidi to change the name of Gatot Subroto Airport to Musanif Ryacudu Airport. The name change was submitted by the Governor to the KSAD. The name change was proposed to pay tribute to the hero from Lampung, especially Way Kanan, Major General TNI (ret.) Musannif Ryacudu.

The proposed name change of Gatot Subroto Airport is currently still awaiting a decision from the Army Chief of Staff whether it is approved or not. The airport owned by the Indonesian Army, Gatot Subroto, which was previously named Lanudad Gatot Subroto Lampung, officially serves commercial flights starting April 6, 2019. The inauguration was carried out by the Minister of Transportation Budi Karya Sumadi accompanied by the Army Chief of Staff (KSAD) General TNI Andika Perkasa.

== Commander ==
1. Lieutenant Colonel Cpn Yusuf Hidayat (2019 – 2020)
2. Lieutenant Colonel Cpn Muh. Sahrir (2020 – 2022)
3. Lieutenant Colonel Cpn Kandek Pratikno, SP (2022 - 2024)
4. Lieutenant Colonel Cpn I Putu Arry PB Pratuana (2024 - Incumbent)

== See also ==
- List of airports in Indonesia
