= Tual =

City in Maluku, Indonesia

- City
- City of Tual; Kota Tual
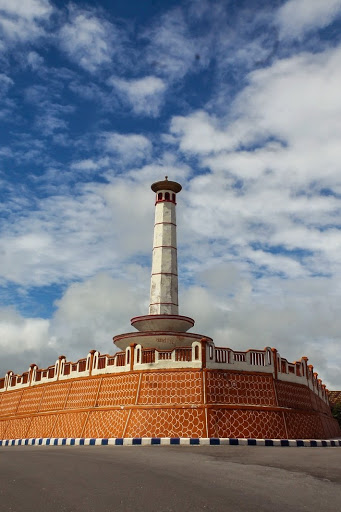
- Tual City Monument

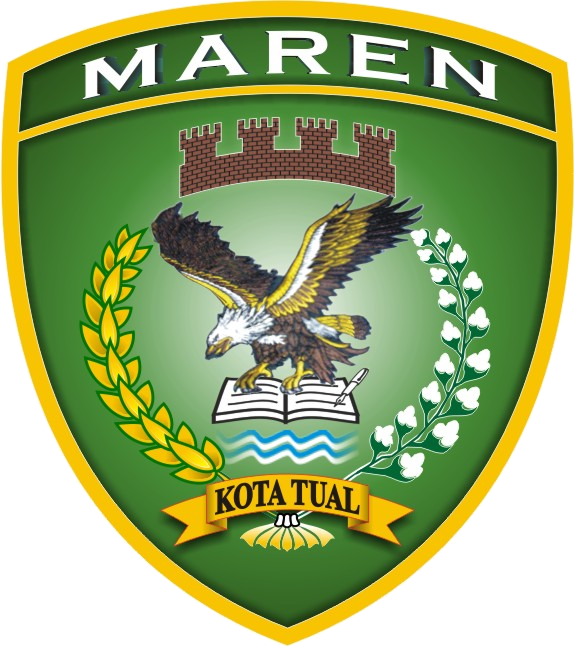
- Coat of arms

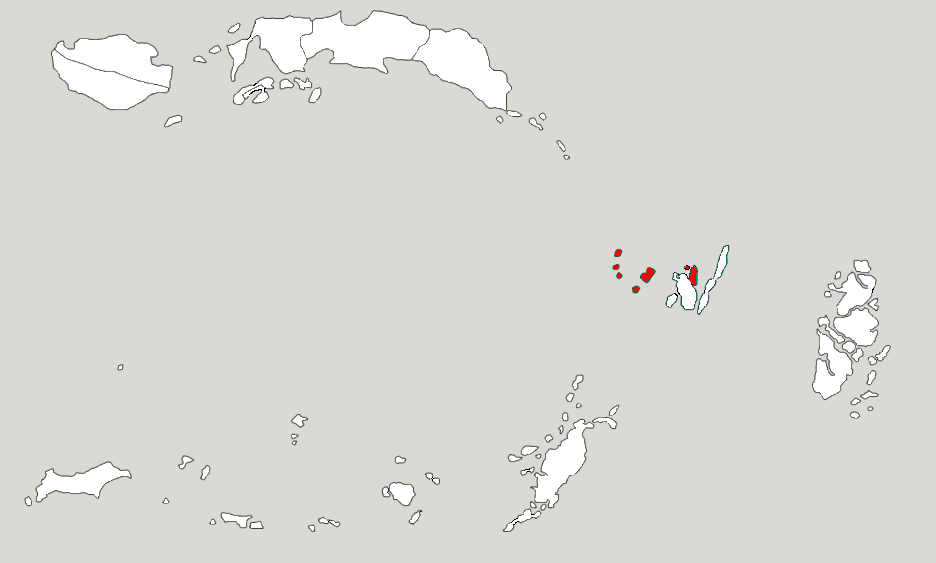
- Location within Maluku
- Interactive map of Tual
- Location in Maluku and Indonesia Tual (Indonesia)
- Coordinates: 5°38′12.5″S 132°45′3″E
- Country: Indonesia
- Province: Maluku
- City status: 2007

Government
  - Mayor: Akhmad Yani Renuat
  - Vice Mayor: Amir Rumra

Area
  - Total: 254.39 km^{2} (98.22 sq mi)

Population (mid 2024 estimate)
  - Total: 90,470
  - Density: 355.6/km^{2} (921.1/sq mi)
- Time zone: UTC+9 (Indonesia Eastern Time)
- Area code: (+62) 916
- Vehicle registration: DE
- HDI (2022): ▲0.686 (Medium)
- Website: tualkota.go.id

Tual (Indonesian: Kota Tual) is a city in Maluku Province of Indonesia, geographically located within the Kai Islands. On 17 July 2007, it was separated from the rest of the Kei Islands (which continue to form the Southeast Maluku Regency) and was created an independent city.

The city covers a land area of 254.39 km^{2} (98.22 sq mi), together with a sea area estimated at 19,088 km^{2} (7,370 sq mi). It includes the urbanized Dullah Island (Indonesian: Pulau Dullah) which is situated to the northeast of the much larger Kai Kecil, and includes a further number of small islands to the west of Kai Kecil.

== Geography ==
The city comprises the main Dullah Island (Pulau Dullah) together with numerous smaller islands off the north of Kei Kecil island, together with the small archipelagoes of the Tayando Islands, and Kur Islands, which lie to the west of the Kei Islands. The total land area of these islands is 254.39 km^{2} (98.22 sq mi). The Tayando Islands have a maximum altitude of around 100 metres above the sea, while the Kur Islands has an altitude of around 400 metres. On Dullah Island, the city has a small slope between 0 and 25 degrees, most of it generally considered to be a low-lying region. However, there are several points within the city boundaries that have steep slopes above 45 degrees.

The majority of the soils in the city are latosol, podzol, and rendzina. The soils generally are fertile and have good drainage, with the inhabitants using the land for agriculture, especially during the rainy season, growing various tubers.

=== Climate ===
Tual has a tropical monsoon climate (Köppen Am) with moderate rainfall from August to October and heavy to very heavy rainfall from November to July.

Climate data for Tual (2004–2020)
Month	Jan	Feb	Mar	Apr	May	Jun	Jul	Aug	Sep	Oct	Nov	Dec	Year
Mean daily maximum °C (°F)	31.0 (87.8)	31.0 (87.8)	31.0 (87.8)	31.2 (88.2)	31.0 (87.8)	30.1 (86.2)	29.6 (85.3)	29.8 (85.6)	30.9 (87.6)	32.1 (89.8)	32.5 (90.5)	31.6 (88.9)	31.0 (87.8)
Mean daily minimum °C (°F)	24.1 (75.4)	24.0 (75.2)	24.1 (75.4)	24.1 (75.4)	24.4 (75.9)	24.2 (75.6)	24.0 (75.2)	23.5 (74.3)	23.9 (75.0)	23.9 (75.0)	24.0 (75.2)	24.2 (75.6)	24.0 (75.3)
Average rainfall mm (inches)	410.1 (16.15)	310.5 (12.22)	487.6 (19.20)	306.8 (12.08)	244.8 (9.64)	247.6 (9.75)	154.0 (6.06)	44.6 (1.76)	57.2 (2.25)	71.8 (2.83)	154.4 (6.08)	411.9 (16.22)	2,901.3 (114.24)
Average rainy days	20.0	17.8	19.3	16.8	15.3	15.3	10.1	6.5	5.5	6.2	10.2	19.5	162.5
Source: Meteomanz

== Governance ==
=== Administrative districts ===
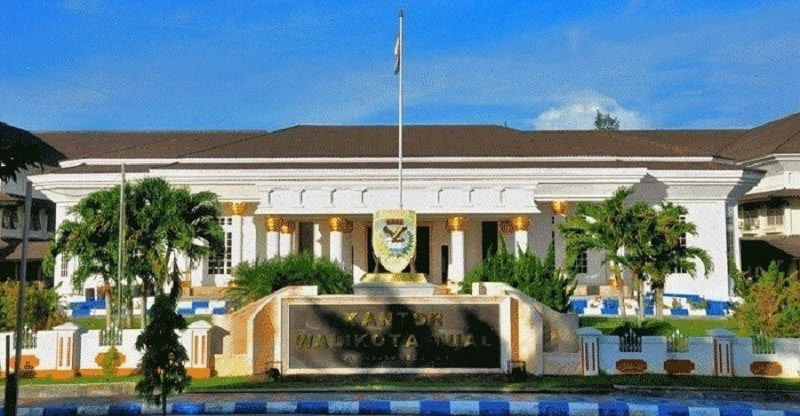
Mayoral office building of Tual

The city as of 2010 was divided into four districts (kecamatan), but subsequently in 2018 a fifth district — Kur Selatan (South Kur) — was created from part of Pulau-Pulau Kur District. These are tabulated below with their areas and their populations as of the 2010 census and 2020 census, together with the official estimates as at mid 2024. The table also includes the locations of the district administrative centres, the number of administrative villages in each district (totaling 3 urban kelurahan and 27 rural desa), and its post code.

Kode Wilayah	Name of District (kecamatan)	Area in km^{2}	Pop'n Census 2010	Pop'n Census 2020	Pop'n Estimate mid 2024	Admin centre	No. of villages	Post code
81.72.04	Pulau-Pulau Kur	19.61	4,895	2,615	2,843	Tubyal	5 ^{(a)}	97615
81.72.05	Kur Selatan	28.72	^{(b)}	3,325	3,929	Warkar	7	97614
81.72.03	Tayando Tam	73.74	5,448	7,486	7,893	Tayando Yamtel	5	97613
81.72.01	Pulau Dullah Utara	91.57	14,564	23,433	24,620	Namser	8	97612
81.72.02	Pulau Dullah Selatan	40.75	33,175	51,421	51,185é	Tual	5	97611
	Totals	254.39	58,082	88,280	90,470	Tual	30	

Note: (a) including 3 kelurahan - Ketsoblak, Lodar El and Masrum. (b) the 2010 population of the new Kur Selatan District is included in the figure for Pulau-Pulau Kur, from which it was split off.

== Geography ==
The Kur Islands District (Kecamatan Pulau-Pulau Kur) comprises the northern part of the Kur Islands archipelago, consisting of the northern half of Kur Island together with islands to its north including Kaimear, Kanos and Bui, of which Kaimear is the only inhabited island. The South Kur District (Kecamatan Kur Selatan) consists of the southern half of Kur Island, together with islands to its south including Mangur, Fadol and Wonen, of which only Mangur is inhabited. The Kur Islands are situated far to the west of the Kayando Tam group.

The Tayando Tam District (Kecamatan Tayando Tam) comprises 27 islands (of which the largest and only populated ones are Pulau Tayando and Pulau Tam) situated to the west of Kei Kecil. There are five villages - Ngurhir on Tam Island, and Langgiar, Yamtel, Ohoitel and Yamru on Yayando Island

North Dullah Island District (Kecamatan Pulau Dullah Utara) comprises the northern half of Dullah Island, and 22 smaller islands, while the more urbanised South Dullah Island District (Kecamatan Pulau Dullah Selatan) comprises the southern part of Dullah Island and 7 smaller islands.

== Economy ==
The city produced 3.9 tons of galangal, 3.7 tons of turmeric, and 2.02 tons of ginger in 2019. This is a sharp decrease from the previous year, in which the city produced 11 tons of galangal, 4.2 tons of turmeric, and 3.45 tons of ginger, suggesting a decline in the agricultural sector and a shift to the industry and service sectors. Other agricultural commodities such as sweet potatoes and cassava also experienced a decline in production, from 21 tons to 14 tons and 107 tons to 76 tons, respectively. Another sector, fishery, contributes significantly to the local economy, in which there were 30,638 tons of seafood products from the city in 2019, ranging from tuna to shrimp. In the industry sector, fish meal production is the main industry product with an investment value of more than $680,000. There are 12 registered restaurants in the city, not counting informal restaurants and shops. Unemployment rate was 9.3% as of 2019.

As the city's location is isolated and dependent on logistics from the sea, it is very prone to high inflation. The inflation rate in 2020 was 1.15%, which was the highest inflation rate in Indonesia that year.

== Demographics ==
Around 75% of the population are Muslim, 25% are Christian, 0.08% are Hindu, and 0.01% are Buddhist. The city's life expectancy is 65.21. As at mid 2023, there were 44,782 males and 45,225 females.

== Education ==
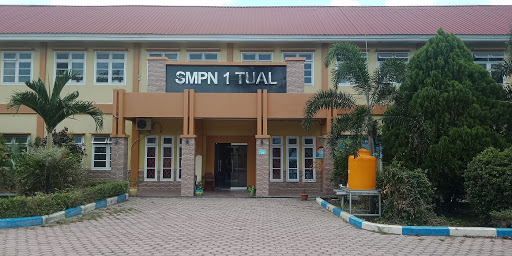
A junior high school in Tual

There are fifteen kindergartens, sixty-four elementary schools, thirty junior high schools, fourteen senior high schools, and six vocational high schools both public and private. In addition, there are three higher education institutions.

== Healthcare ==
The city only has one hospital, but is also supported by two clinics, nineteen puskesmas, and one central pharmacy. The only hospital in the city, Maren Hi Noho Renuat Regional Hospital, is owned by city government and undergoing an expansion expected to be completed in 2021. There are also 18 family planning clinics as of 2019. There are exactly 100 mosques and 24 churches in the city.

== Transportation ==
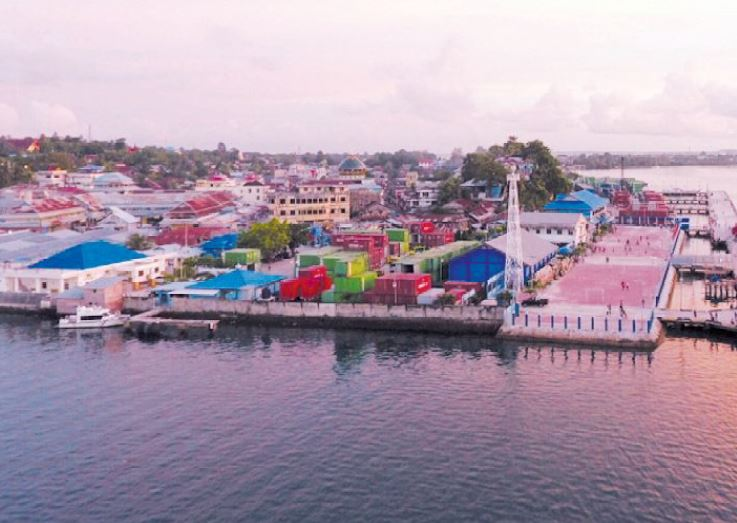
Aerial view of Tual Seaport

187,72 kilometers out of 353,59 kilometers of roads in the city are paved using asphalt. Angkots exist in the city and are the only available form of public transportation. Other informal taxis and motorcycle taxis also exist, but online transportation services such as Grab and Gojek have not yet established a presence as of 2021. The closest airport is Karel Sadsuitubun Airport and Dumatubin Airport which are located around 10 minutes' journey from the city. The city is also served by Pelni to connect it to other neighboring islands and regions.

== Media ==
The city and neighbouring regions have access to 4G internet service, in addition to other basic telecommunication services such as the telephone. There are also some public Wi-Fi spots provided by the government. The only fiber optic connection provider is IndiHome, which is state-owned under Telkom Indonesia.
