= Merpati Nusantara Airlines Flight 8968 =

2011 aviation accident

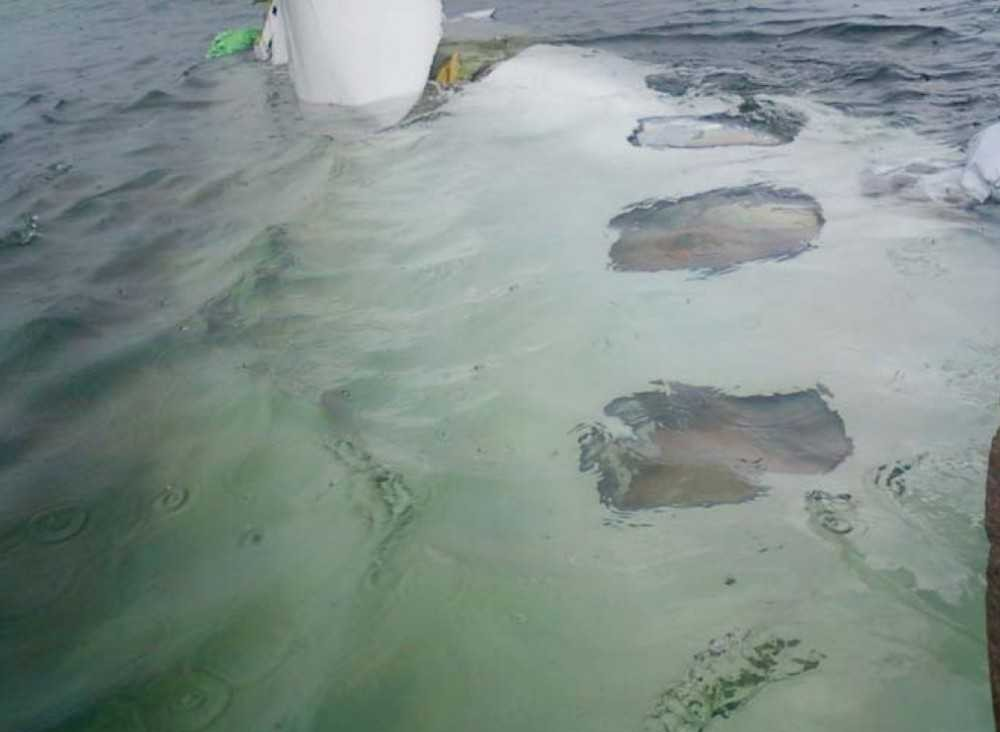
- Part of fuselage recovered after the crash

Accident
- Date: 7 May 2011
- Summary: Crashed into the sea during go-around due to pilot error
- Site: Off the coast near Utarom Airport, Kaimana, Indonesia; 03°39′08″S 133°41′15″E

Aircraft
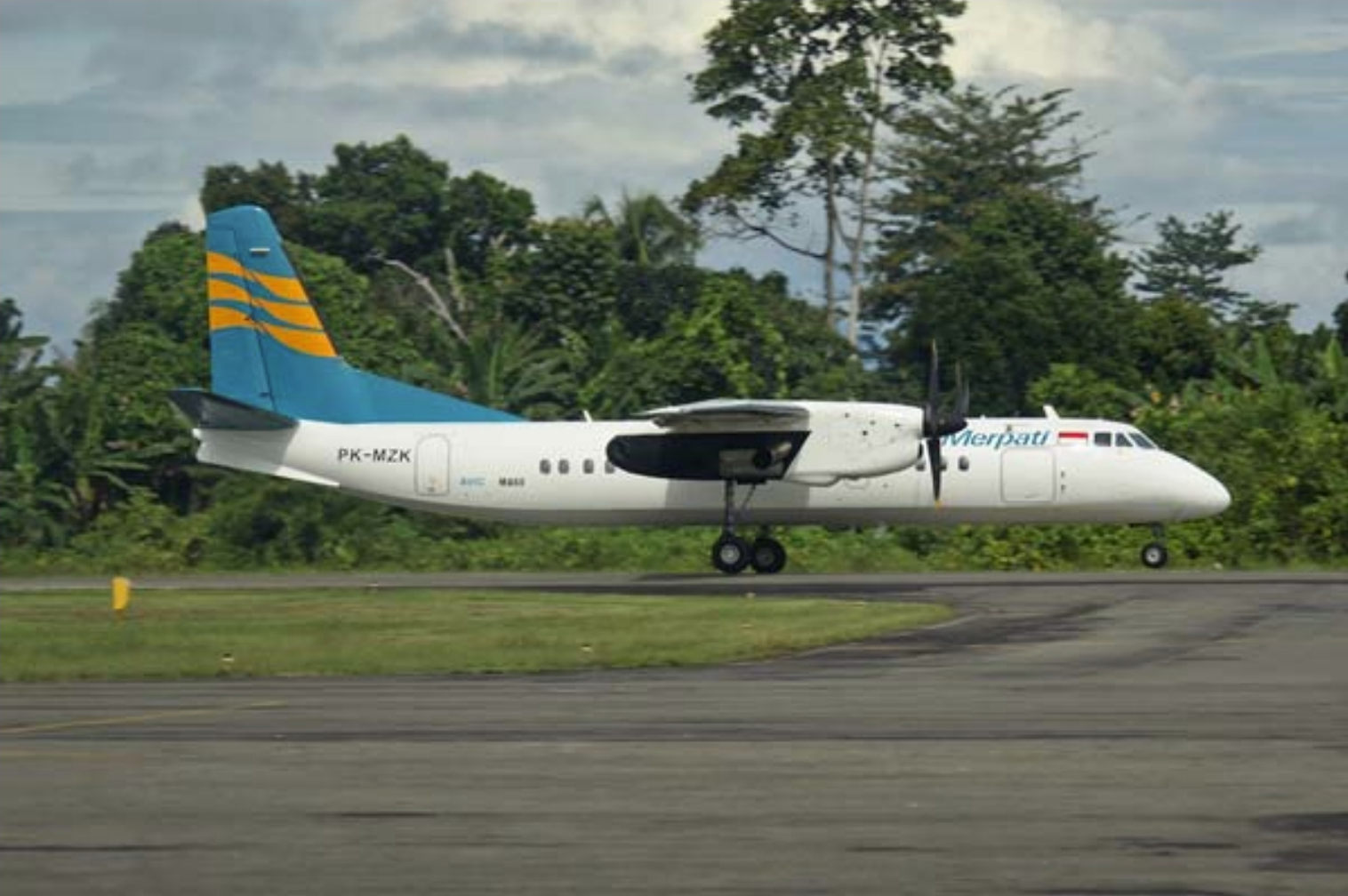
- PK-MZK, the aircraft involved in the accident
- Aircraft type: Xian MA60
- Operator: Merpati Nusantara Airlines
- IATA flight No.: MZ8968
- ICAO flight No.: MNA8968
- Call sign: Merpati 8968
- Registration: PK-MZK
- Flight origin: Domine Eduard Osok Airport, Sorong, Indonesia
- Stopover: Utarom Airport, Kaimana, Indonesia
- Destination: Nabire Airport, Nabire, Indonesia
- Occupants: 25
- Passengers: 21
- Crew: 4
- Fatalities: 25
- Survivors: 0

Merpati Nusantara Airlines Flight 8968 (MZ8968/MNA8968) was a passenger flight which crashed off the coast of the Indonesian province of West Papua on 7 May 2011. The aircraft involved, a Xian MA60, was operating Merpati Nusantara Airlines' scheduled domestic service from Sorong to Kaimana, both in West Papua. It crashed into the sea while on approach to Kaimana in heavy rain condition, about 800 metres (2,600 ft) before the runway. All 25 people on board the aircraft were killed. It remains the only fatal accident involving a Xian MA60.

The Indonesian National Transportation Safety Committee concluded that the crash was caused by pilot error. During the approach, both pilots were struggling to see the airport due to adverse weather in the area and eventually initiated a go around procedure. However, they did not pay enough attention to the bank angle of the aircraft as both of them were looking out of the window. The lack of situational awareness eventually caused the Xian MA60 to overbank and it subsequently plunged into the sea.

== Aircraft ==
The aircraft involved was a Chinese-built twin-turboprop Xian MA60 with Indonesian registration PK-MZK. According to NTSC, the aircraft was manufactured in 2007 with a manufacturer's serial number (MSN) of 0603. The aircraft had entered service in October 2010, logging fewer than 700 hours since then. The aircraft was equipped with two Pratt & Whitney Canada PW127J engines.

== Passengers and crews ==
Officials initially reported that there were a total of 27 people on board the aircraft. According to the passenger manifest that had been issued by Merpati, there were 25 people on board the aircraft, all Indonesian, comprising 21 passengers and 4 crew members. The 21 passengers consisted of 18 adults, 2 children and 1 infant. The four crew members consisted of two pilots and two flight attendants. There were two flight engineers on board the aircraft but they were listed as passengers on the manifest.

The pilot was identified as 55-year-old Captain Purwandi Wahyu. He joined Merpati Nusantara Airlines in 1977 as a co-pilot of a DHC-6. According to records, the captain was very experienced as he had accumulated a total of 24,470 flying hours. However, only 199 hours were on the Xian MA60. The majority of his flying experience was on the Fokker aircraft, particularly the Fokker F100 in which he had accrued a total of 6,982 flying hours. The co-pilot was identified as 36-year-old First Officer Paul Nap. First Officer Nap joined Merpati in 2007. Contrary to Captain Wahyu, the majority of First Officer Nap's flying experience was on the Xian MA60. Of the 370 flying hours, 234 hours were on the type.

== Flight ==
Flight 8968 was a domestic passenger service from Sorong to Kaimana. First Officer Nap was the pilot flying while Captain Wahyu was the pilot monitoring. According to the flight log, the aircraft and the crew had flown for three other passenger flights earlier in the day, all of which were in Papua and West Papua. The flight was planned to be conducted under instrument flight rules (IFR), while the approach would be conducted under the visual flight rules (VFR) as the destination airport did not publish the procedure for an IFR approach.

At 12:45 p.m local time, Flight 8968 took off from Sorong with 21 passengers and 4 crew members. It was cleared to fly at an altitude of 15,000 feet (4,600 m) within the controlled airspace. Following its departure from the area's controlled airspace, the crew later contacted Biak and continued their flight to Kaimana.

At 13:20 p.m, the crew established contact with the controller at Kaimana and announced the estimated time of arrival of 13:54 p.m. The crew subsequently received information regarding the weather in Kaimana. The controller reported that the airport was under moderate rain with a visibility of approximately 3 to 8 kilometres (1.9 to 5.0 mi; 1.6 to 4.3 nmi). The crew continued their flight and the aircraft began to descend at 13:25 p.m at a distance of approximately 62 miles (54 nmi; 100 km) from Kaimana.

At around 13:30 p.m, Kaimana controller reported that the weather had deteriorated and the airport was under heavy rain. Captain Wahyu then asked the controller if there was any remaining area that was not raining. The controller subsequently responded that the area south of the airport was still clear. Captain Wahyu then asked First Officer Nap to fly towards the south of the airport for an attempted visual approach.

Approximately seven nautical miles from the airport, the crew gave another positional report. The controller in Kaimana, however, announced that it was still raining heavily at the airport and the visibility had deteriorated to two kilometres (1.2 mi; 1.1 nmi). Captain Wahyu then asked the controller if the runway could be seen from the tower. The tower confirmed that they could see the runway and the crew decided to continue the approach to Kaimana.

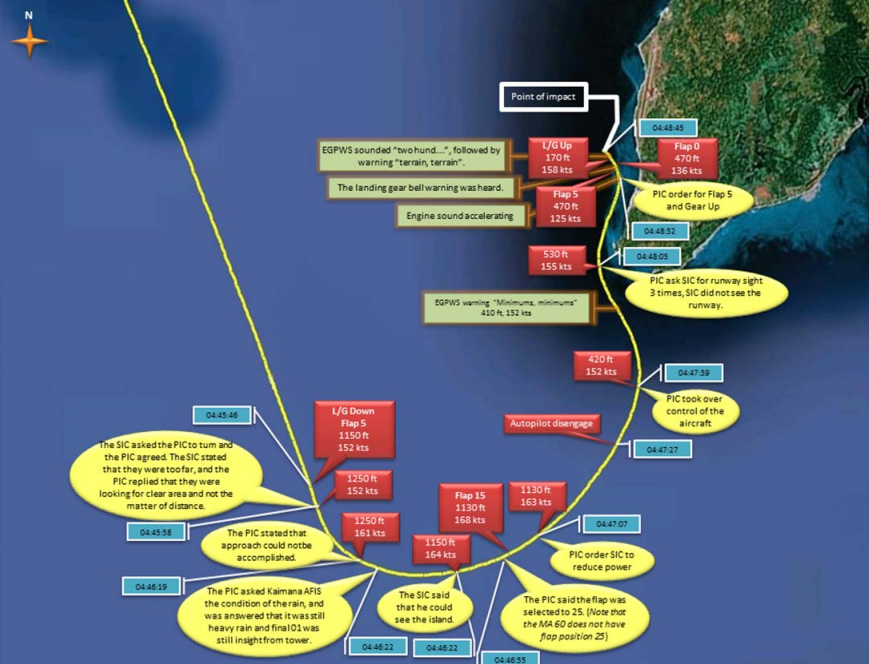
Illustration of the final segments of the flight (taken from NTSC final report)

The aircraft was then configured for landing and the cabin crew were asked to prepare the passengers. The autopilot was disengaged at an altitude of 960 feet (290 m). Captain Wahyu then took over the control from First Officer Nap. The crew then tried to locate the runway but due to the limited visibility they were unable to see it. They then decided to initiate a go around. The aircraft was put into a climb and turned to the left. The engines were accelerated and the flaps and the landing gear were retracted.

The crew initially turned the aircraft to the left with a bank angle of 11 degree. The angle then began to increase, reaching as much as 38 degrees. The aircraft rapidly descended towards the sea with a rate of descent of 3,000 feet per minute (15 m/s) and within seconds the aircraft plunged into the sea at a speed of 158 knots (293 km/h; 182 mph). The aircraft broke into four main pieces and sank approximately 800 metres (2,600 ft) southwest of the runway.

The controller lost all contact with the crew of Flight 8968. An eyewitness then phoned the controller and stated that a Merpati aircraft had just crashed into the water near the airport. Subsequently, airport personnel and rescue services were deployed to the crash site. According to a local navy officer, the aircraft "exploded" on impact. There were no survivors.

== Recovery ==
The Indonesian National Search and Rescue Agency announced that a total of fifteen bodies have been recovered in the immediate aftermath of the crash, with the remainder still trapped inside the wreckage. Indonesian Navy, local police, airport officials and members of the public were involved in the search for the victims. A search involving ten Navy divers was initiated to recover additional bodies, though weather conditions and equipment difficulties made the effort unsuccessful. The search eventually had to be temporarily halted due to strong current, which reportedly had shifted the wreckage by 500 meters from its original position.

The wreckage was found submerged in the shallow sea between 7 and 15 metres (23 and 49 ft) deep, located approximately 550 metres (1,800 ft; 600 yd) off the coast of Kaimana and 880 metres (2,890 ft; 960 yd) before the runway. It was spread over an area of 100 by 200 metres (330 ft × 660 ft). The aircraft's flight data recorder was recovered on 8 May. According to officials, it was retrieved from the depth of 12 metres (39 ft), beneath a body of the victims. On the same day, officials also announced that the bodies of 20 people, including 2 flight attendants, have been recovered from the crash site. Of the 20, a total of 16 have been identified.

On 9 May, search and rescue personnel managed to pinpoint the location of the cockpit voice recorder. They also recovered two bodies from the crash site, including a 5-year-old child, bringing the total number of recovered bodies to 22. Officials reported that the remains of Captain Wahyu and First Officer Nap were still missing. On 10 May, rescue personnel managed to recover another body from the crash site. The bodies of the captain and the first officer were later discovered inside the cockpit. However, the recovery operation was postponed due to strong undersea current in the area. Their remains were recovered on the next day. All 25 victims had been recovered on 11 May and were immediately repatriated to their respective families.

Salvage workers initiated the recovery operation for the wreckage of the aircraft on 20 May and lasted until 31 May. According to the NTSC, they managed to recover most of the aircraft's parts, including the forward fuselage and the cockpit.

After examination, it was discovered that the contents of the recorder were encrypted in Chinese; as a result, the recorder was sent to China to be decrypted.

== Response ==
As Indonesia was holding the 19th ASEAN Summit at the exact same day in Jakarta, then-Indonesian President Susilo Bambang Yudhoyono broke the news of the crash to the attending guests and asked them to hold a minute of silence for the victims of Flight 8968. In response to the crash, the president ordered immediate recovery operation for the victims of the flight. In the immediate aftermath, Merpati set up a hotline for families of the passengers and crews of Flight 8968. The airline also sent three aircraft for logistical matters, one each from Makassar, Biak and Sorong. Following the crash, CEO of Merpati Sardjono Jhony immediately flew to Kaimana.

Spokesman from the airline stated that victims could be provided with compensation of up to Rp 700 million. Another Rp300 million would be provided from the London-based insurance company Aon, totaling 1 billion rupiah in compensation. In line with the nation's aviation regulation, each victims would also be provided with at least Rp50 million rupiah from government-owned insurance company Jasa Raharja.

On 9 May, the Indonesian People's Representative Council held the 4th session of the 2010-2011 agenda. During the opening of the session, a minute of silence for the victims of Flight 8968 was observed. Members of the parliament questioned the Ministry of Transportation following the discovery that the Xian MA60 had not acquired FAA certification. Deputy speaker of the House, Priyo Budi Santoso, stated that a special probe would be required to investigate the matter. Commission V of the People's Representatives Council eventually asked the Indonesian government to ground every Xian MA60 aircraft in service in Indonesia and to conduct an official audit, but their request to ground Merpati MA60 was denied by then-Minister of State Owned Enterprises Mustafa Abubakar. There were also calls to the government to merge Merpati into Garuda Indonesia Airlines, the flag carrier of Indonesia, and to evaluate every aviation policies in the country. After the hearing, the Indonesian Ministry of Transportation announced that the ministry would evaluate the operation of Merpati Nusantara Airlines for at least 6 months, including an official audit.

There were also speculations regarding the airworthiness of the aircraft. Prior to the crash, the Xian MA60 had been grounded by authorities due to visible cracks on the horizontal stabilizer. This shortcoming had been acknowledged by the manufacturer and several maintenance changes were later implemented. Xian Aircraft International Corporation (XAIC) denied claims that the aircraft was unairworthy and stated that the aircraft had met the required FAA standards. Minister of Transportation initially stated that people should not spread baseless speculations on the quality of the aircraft. Hatta Rajasa, Indonesian Coordinating Minister for Economic Affairs, reiterated the same statement, adding that people should wait for the result of the official investigation. The Transportation Ministry eventually conducted a thorough evaluation on the airworthiness of Merpati's MA60 fleet. The investigation didn't find any issues on eleven of Merpati Xian MA60 fleet.

On 10 May, Merpati Nusantara's president, Sardjono Jhony Tjitrokusumo offered to resign if the crash was the fault of the airline, saying that "I am ready to tender my resignation if the error was from Merpati's side."

On 13 May, the Indonesian government ordered Merpati Nusantara to perform safety inspections on its other twelve MA60 aircraft. In announcing the order, President Susilo Bambang Yudhoyono said that "[t]here should be a prevention effort and inspection of the same type of Merpati aircraft [...] This [is] important to the public so they can get clear explanation."

=== Allegations of markup ===
The crash of Flight 8968 sparked controversy within the government of Indonesia. It began following the discovery of discrepancy between the requested fund for the purchase of Xian MA60, which was significantly higher than the actual price of the aircraft. The projected total fund should've been lower than the requested fund, creating speculations of a possible markup (listed as a mean of fraud in the nation), with officials from Ministry of State Owned Enterprises, Ministry of National Development Planning of Indonesia, and Ministry of Transportation officials accused of being involved in the scheme.

The discovery of the MA60's non-availability of the required FAA certification and the controversial remark from then-Vice President Jusuf Kalla regarding the Chinese-made aircraft caused the allegations to flare up. There were also speculations that China had pressured the government to keep buying the aircraft by investing in a power plant project in Indonesia. As such, calls for a special probe were made by parliamentary members. The Indonesian House created a special committee to investigate the allegations. Leader of Labour Union of State-owned Enterprise Arief Poyuono reported the case to the Indonesian Corruption Eradication Commission for possible corruption charges against officials.

Following reports that the Chinese government had pressured the Indonesian government with a power plant project, former Transportation Minister Jusman Syafii Djamal denied the allegations. Incumbent Vice President Jusuf Kalla also denied the claim, stating that there was no correlation between both issues. Meanwhile, President Susilo Bambang Yudhoyono asked further clarification from the Ministry of State-owned Enterprise regarding the purchase of Merpati's MA60 fleet, following reports that his staff had been involved in the issue. A cabinet meeting was later held to discuss the issue.

The Indonesian People's Representatives Council summoned officials who had been purportedly involved in the MA60 scheme to the Indonesian House in Senayan. Parliament members ordered Merpati to stop operating the MA60 in Indonesia. The Indonesian Supreme Court summoned Merpati's CEO and other officials regarding the purchase of the aircraft. The court was also asked to investigate the Indonesian Ministry of Trade for its alleged involvement. In response to allegations of corruption, the court would involve members from the Corruption Eradication Commission. The Ministry of State-owned Enterprise announced that they would provide support for the probe. Few months later, Audit Board of Indonesia confirmed that there was discrepancy on the purchasing process of the MA60.

The crash significantly contributed to the decline of Merpati Nusantara Airlines.

== Investigation ==
The Indonesian National Transportation Safety Committee (NTSC) opened an investigation into the accident and was assisted with their Chinese counterpart from the Civil Aviation Administration of China (CAAC) as the state of the manufacturer. NTSC sent a team of investigators to Kaimana hours after the crash. Members from NTSC advised the public not to mix politics and the concurrent controversy regarding the aircraft into the investigation.

CEO of Merpati Sardjono Jhony stated that the aircraft was airworthy as the maintenance logbook didn't indicate any kind of defects on the Xian MA60. This was confirmed by officials from the transportation ministry.

=== Weather ===
Initially, there were speculations that the crash had been caused by the inclement weather condition around Kaimana as heavy rain was prevailing near the airport during the crash. Indonesian Transport Minister Freddy Numberi stated that the condition in the area might have played a role in the crash. An official from Kaimana's Utarom Airport refuted the report that the area was under heavy rain and stated that the weather was drizzling with a fairly good visibility, adding that bad weather was not the direct cause of the crash.

The weather report that had been provided to Kaimana's Utarom Airport, however, confirmed that there was a decline in regards to the weather condition around Kaimana. At around 13:00 local time, the visibility was still at eight kilometres (5.0 mi; 4.3 nmi) with light surface wind. An incoming rain was noted and cumulonimbus clouds could be seen located at the southwest of the airport. Another report, which was released an hour after the previous one, stated that the visibility had dropped to three kilometres (1.9 mi; 1.6 nmi) with moderate rain in the area. There wasn't any much change with the area's surface wind. According to the transmission that had been sent by the airport controller during the approach, the visibility had deteriorated to two kilometres (1.2 mi; 1.1 nmi) and the rain in the area had intensified.

Other than the visibility, there was no evidence that the crash had been caused by strong winds, windshear or any other weather-related phenomenon. With a visibility of two kilometres (1.2 mi; 1.1 nmi), the pilots ability to see the runway were limited. As the approach was conducted under the visual flight rules, the pilots were not allowed to carry out an approach and should have waited until the weather started to improve. The CVR readout recorded the "minimum" alert of the aircraft's GPWS inside the cockpit during its approach to Kaimana. As per Merpati's manual, the crew should have elected to abandon their landing attempt as they had not stabilized their approach.

The flight recorders revealed that the crew eventually did initiate a go-around as they had failed to locate the runway. However, the aircraft began to significantly bank to the left and the altitude started to drop rapidly until it crashed onto the water. As strong wind was not present during the time of the crash, human error might have played a significant role.

=== Human factor ===
The pilots handling of the aircraft were questioned by investigators as it was evident that they had lost the control of the MA60. The weather in the area had definitely affected their performance on the flight. After they had received multiple information regarding the declining condition, they insisted to continue the approach, even though there were numerous cues that they had to postpone the approach. The deteriorating condition further worsened their awareness as their workload further increased and they began to feel stressed on the matter.

The pilots then failed to check their approach checklist, which, according to investigators, was crucial so both crew would have "synchronized the plan to conduct the approach", including plans regarding actions that they would have taken had the flight deviated from the standard procedure. Subsequently, the pilots chose the wrong engine mode during the approach, creating a torque value of 70% and 82%, significantly lower than the usual 95% value. This resulted in the decline of performance of the MA60.

Due to their failure of finding the runway, the pilots decided to go around. The flight recorder captured Captain Wahyu's call to retract the flaps to 25, which was basically a non-existent configuration in the Xian MA60. The flap was then retracted to 5, a procedure which existed within the go-around procedure for the Fokker F100, the previous type that had been flown by him. According to the investigation, Captain Wahyu's action was caused by him feeling stressed due to the difficult approach and the eventual decision to go-around.

Despite the wrong action that had been done by Captain Wahyu, Co-pilot Nap, who was far more experienced with the MA60 flight control system, had been sitting beside the Captain during the whole approach and should have reminded the Captain regarding the wrong configuration. The CVR recording revealed that the communication between both pilots were limited, even before the flight's approach phase. Investigators suspected that there was steep trans-cockpit authority gradient between both crew, as in multiple occasions there were basically very limited conversation between both crew. This might have been caused by the difference between Captain Wahyu's 30-year of flying experience and Co-pilot Nap's 370 hours of flying experience. There was indication that the Captain might have doubted his co-pilot's ability to fly. As a far less experienced pilot, Co-pilot became the passive person in the cockpit and thus didn't speak up on the Captain's mistakes.

During the go-around phase, the pilots still tried to look for the runway. They shifted their attention from the flight control to the outside environment as they tried to locate the runway. This lack of awareness eventually led to the overbanking state of the aircraft. The bank angle of the aircraft was left unmonitored. Combined with the lowered performance of the aircraft that had been made by the pilots' wrong configuration, the aircraft rapidly descended. The low altitude of the MA60 made it difficult for the crew to recover the aircraft.

=== Merpati's failure ===
Further examination was conducted of the training program for both pilots as questions were raised regarding the action of a pilot with 30 years of experience who somehow could revert towards operational habits developed on another type. Even though Captain Wahyu was flying a Xian MA60 at the time of the crash, he regressed to his old flying pattern of the Fokker F100. Before changing into a new aircraft, a flight crew must be trained first to adapt to the aircraft's flight equipment. If the training program was adequate, the captain should not have regressed to a flying pattern relevant to another type.

The report stated that the training program had not met the required standard as it was deemed to be inadequate. The NTSC, with assistance from the Australian ATSB, also found several non-standard phraseology in the flight manual and the aircraft maintenance manual. Even though the finding was not considered to be a direct cause into the crash, the result was still deemed to be important as it could have caused confusion among the crew.

The finding was that an inadequate training program, combined with the stressful situation that the pilots were encountering during the approach, eventually led to Captain Wahyu's regression to previous habits.

=== Conclusion ===
The final report was published in May 2012. The NTSC summarized their analysis as follow:

The investigation determined that the aircraft was being flown under visual flight in condition that was not suitable for a visual approach. The crew did not follow standard operating procedures and did not conduct an approach briefing or complete the landing checklist. The crew were continually seeking to establish visual reference with the runway but were unsuccessful. Following the decision to discontinue the approach, the PIC deviated from the standard go-around procedures while the aircraft was in close proximity to the water. The rapid descent was mainly a result of a combination of situations such as high bank angle (up to 38 deg to the left) and the flaps retracted to 5 and subsequently to 0 position, and also the combination of other situations such as; engine torque, airspeed, and nose-down pitch

— National Transportation Safety Committee

As most safety actions had been executed by the involved parties prior to the publishing of the final report, investigators only issued six recommendations. Xian aircraft had revised the flight operation and aircraft maintenance manual and extensive safety actions had been conducted by Merpati following the formal audit by the Indonesian government. The NTSC ordered Merpati to review its training management system.

== See also ==
- Merpati Nusantara Airlines Flight 6517, a crash of another Merpati Xian MA60 which further contributed to the decline of the airline.
- Yemenia Flight 626
