= Merpati Nusantara Airlines Flight 836 =

2010 aviation accident in Indonesia

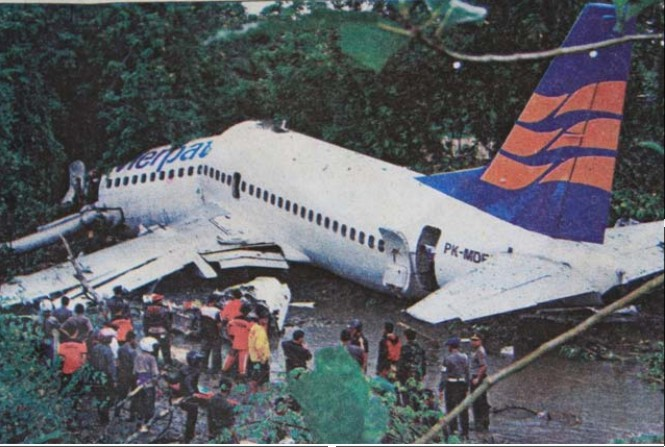
- Wreckage of the aircraft after overrunning the runway

Accident
- Date: 13 April 2010
- Summary: Runway overrun on landing due to bad weather
- Site: Rendani Airport, Manokwari, Indonesia; 0°52′51″S 134°02′52″E

Aircraft
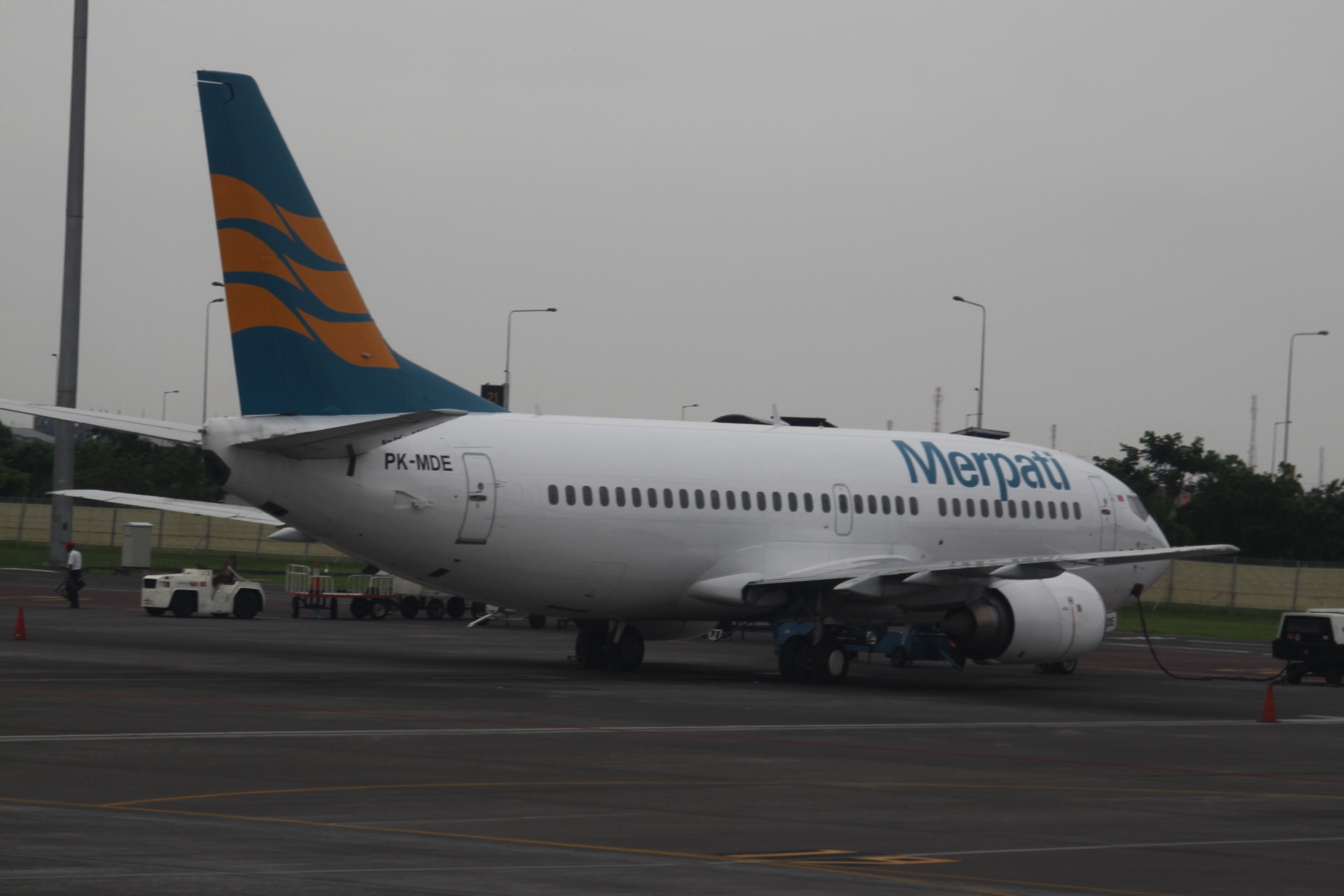
- PK-MDE, the aircraft involved in the accident
- Aircraft type: Boeing 737-322
- Operator: Merpati Nusantara Airlines
- IATA flight No.: MZ836
- ICAO flight No.: MNA836
- Call sign: MERPATI 836
- Registration: PK-MDE
- Flight origin: Sorong Airport, Sorong, Indonesia
- Destination: Rendani Airport, Manokwari, Indonesia
- Occupants: 110
- Passengers: 103
- Crew: 7
- Fatalities: 0
- Injuries: 44
- Survivors: 110

Merpati Nusantara Airlines Flight 836 was a scheduled domestic flight between Sorong and Manokwari, Indonesia. On April 13th, 2010, the flight, operated by a Boeing 737-300 (registered as PK-MDE), overran the runway on landing at Rendani Airport. The aircraft broke into three pieces. All of the 110 occupants on board survived, with 44 of them receiving injuries.

== Aircraft ==
The aircraft involved was a Boeing 737-322 registered as PK-MDE, MSN 24600. It first flew on 16 March 1990 and entered service with United Airlines on 2 April 1990. It was delivered to Merpati Nusantara Airlines on 12th of November, 2009. The accident resulted the aircraft's write off. At the time of the accident, it had completed about 54,759 flight hours in 38,485 cycles. The auxiliary power unit (APU) had been unserviceable since 10 April 2010.

== Accident ==
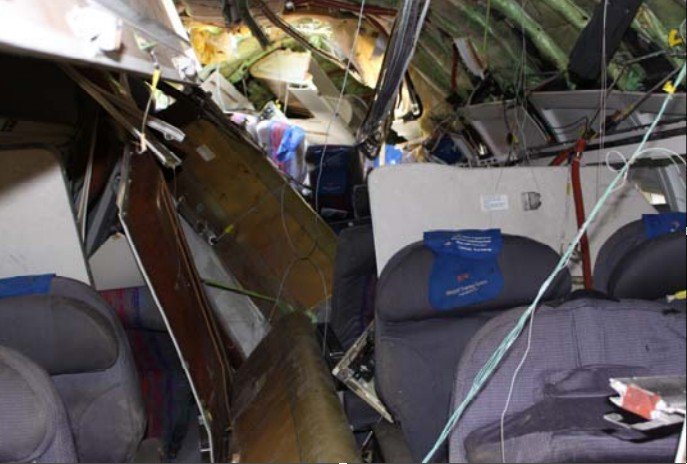
Damage to the cabin of Flight 836

At 11:00 local time (02:00 UTC), Flight 836 overran the runway on landing at Rendani Airport, Manokwari, Indonesia on a scheduled domestic flight from Sorong Airport, Sorong. All 110 people on board survived, with 44 of them being injured, including 10 who were seriously injured and 34 who were minorly injured. The flight was carrying 103 passengers and 6 crew. The weather at the time was rain and mist. After departing the end of the runway, the aircraft struck some trees, tearing off the port wing. The fuselage ended up some 200 metres (660 ft) beyond the end of the 2,004 metres (6,575 ft) long runway at Rendani Airport. The tail of the aircraft broke off and came to rest in the creek off the Northern end of Runway 35. The Captain was reported to have over 16,000 hours total flight time and the co-pilot over 22,000 hours.

== Aftermath ==
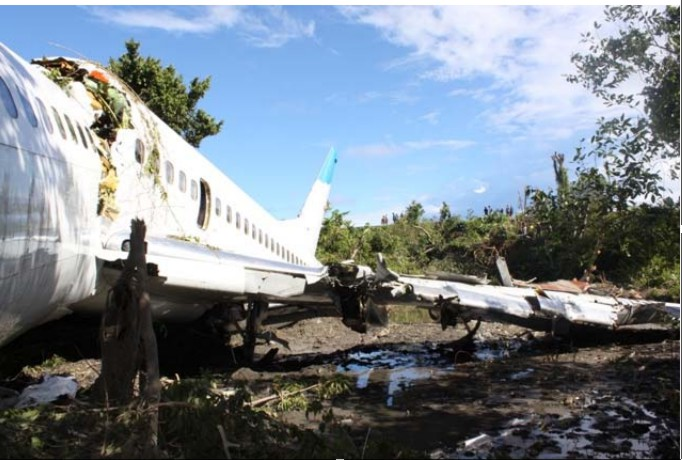
The split, destroyed Boeing 737 shortly after the accident

As a result of the accident, a total of seven safety recommendations were issued, five to the Indonesian Directorate General of Civil Aviation (DGCA) and two to the airline. The DGCA was instructed to review numerous airport facilities against Indonesian safety regulations, as well as Merpati Nusantara's safety regulations, and ensure that they were met. The airline was to conduct a review of its safety regulations, as well as a review of airports it serves to ensure that they were capable of handling aircraft as large as a Boeing 737.
