= Rendani Airport =

Airport in Manokwari, West Papua, Indonesia

Rendani Airport Bandar Udara Rendani
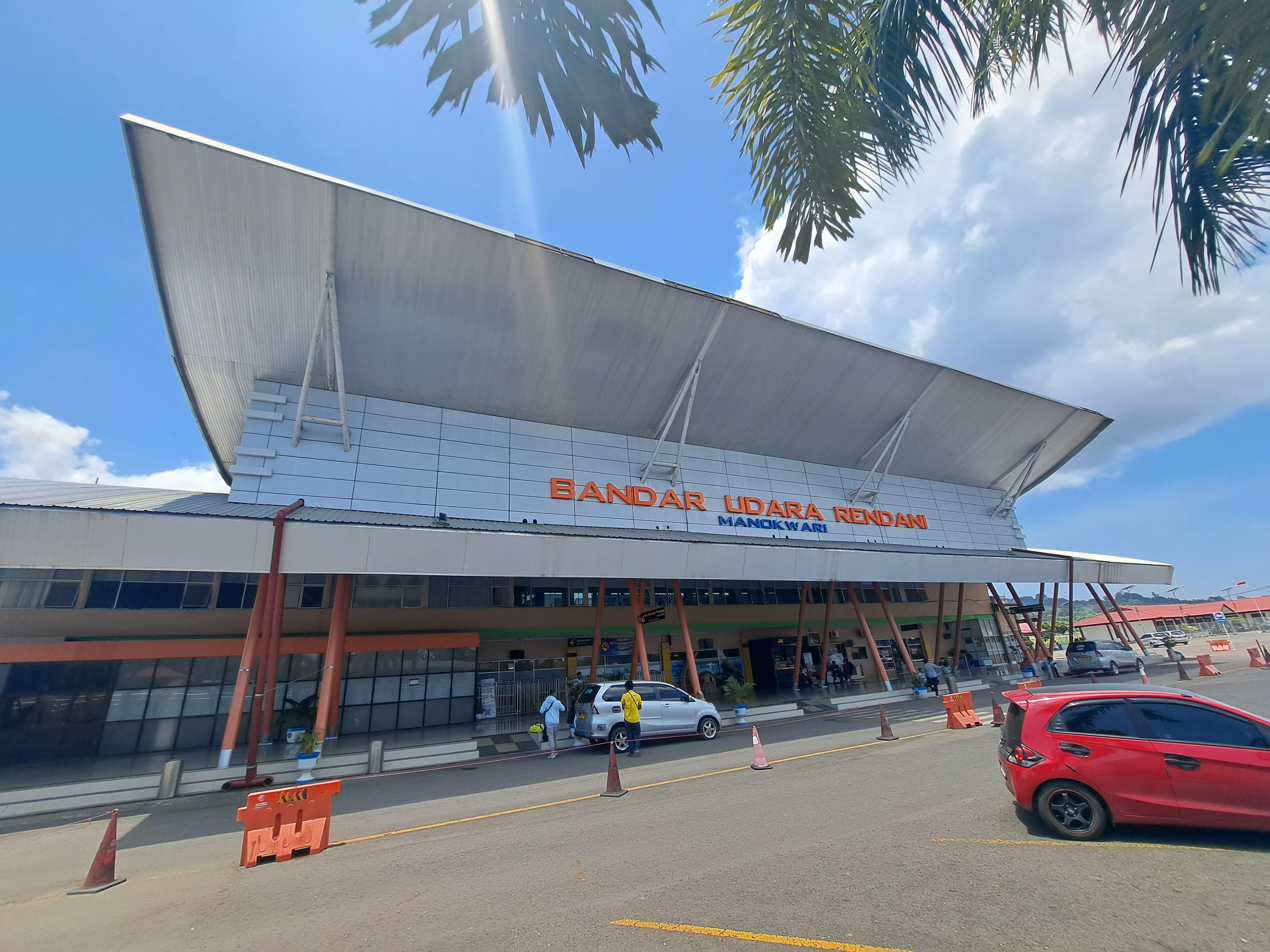
- IATA: MKW; ICAO: WAUU

Summary
- Airport type: Public
- Owner: Government of Indonesia
- Operator: Directorate General of Civil Aviation
- Serves: Manokwari
- Location: Manokwari, Manokwari Regency, West Papua, Indonesia
- Time zone: WIT (UTC+09:00)
- Elevation AMSL: 4.6 m / 15 ft
- Coordinates: 00°53′30″S 134°02′57″E

Map
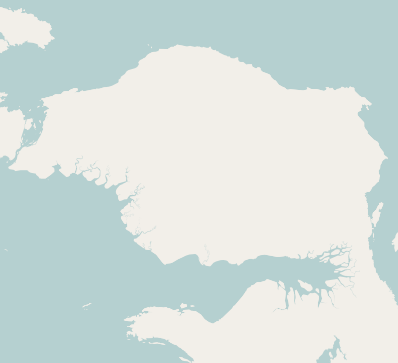
- Location in Bird's Head Peninsula Location in West Papua

Runways
Direction	Length		Surface
Direction	m	ft	Surface
17/35	2,300	7,546	Asphalt

Statistics (2024)
- Passengers: 476,804 (▼6.33%)
- Cargo (tonnes): 2,986.46 (▼3.03%)
- Aircraft movements: 6,129 (▲0.61%)
- Source: DGCA

Rendani Airport (IATA: MKW, ICAO: WAUU) is a domestic airport serving Manokwari, the capital and largest town of West Papua province in Western New Guinea, Indonesia. Located about 3 km (1.86 miles) from the city center, it serves as the main gateway to Manokwari and its surrounding regions, as well as to much of West Papua, particularly the eastern part of the Bird’s Head Peninsula. It is the second-busiest airport on the Bird’s Head Peninsula, after Domine Eduard Osok Airport in Sorong. The airport operates flights to major cities in Western New Guinea, such as Jayapura, Nabire and Sorong, as well as to Makassar in South Sulawesi. In addition, it functions as a hub for pioneer routes to smaller towns, including Fakfak and Kaimana, and other remote areas of West Papua, where air transport is often the only means of access.

== History ==
=== Colonial era ===
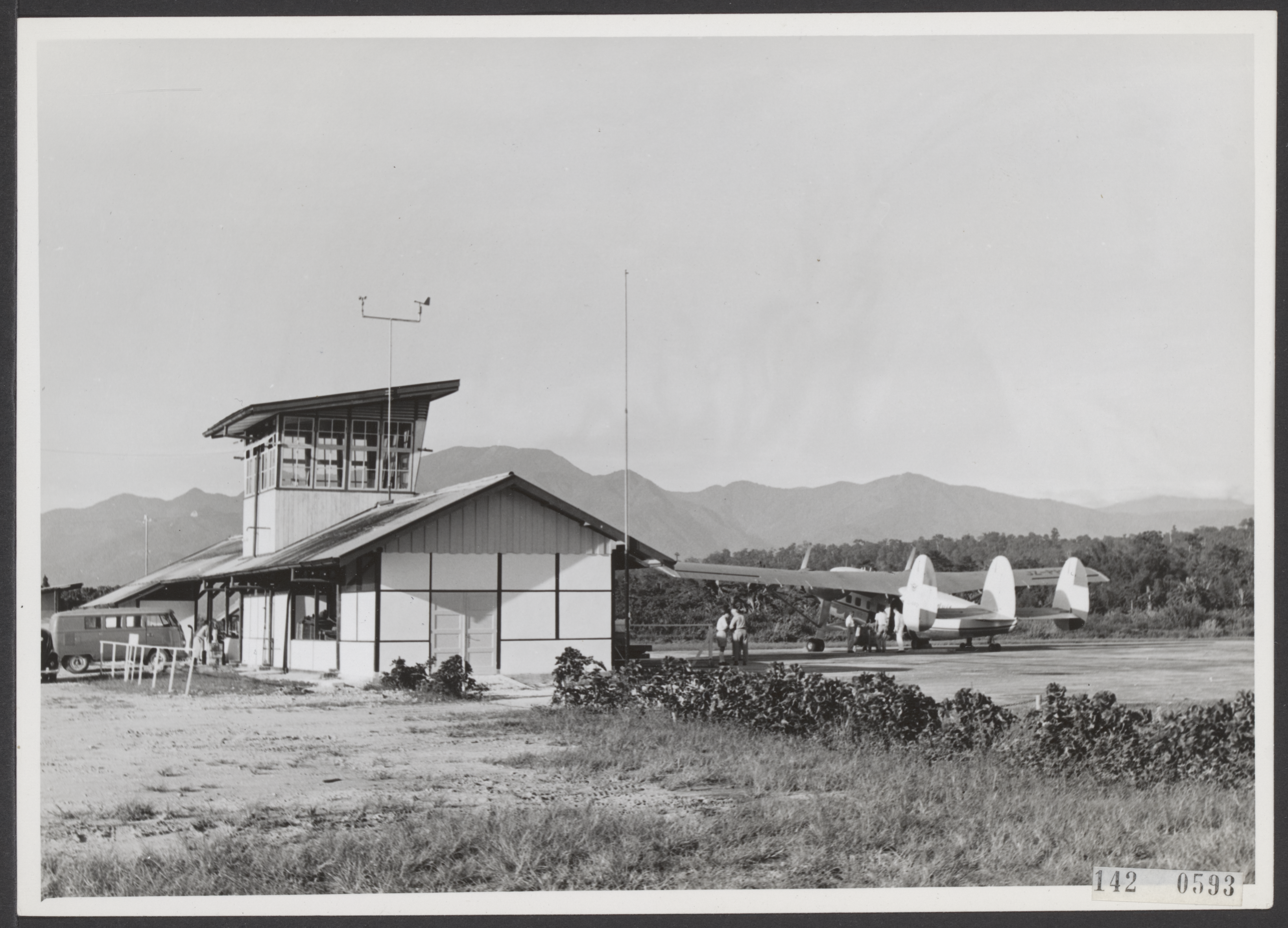
Rendani Airfield in 1957

Prior to the construction of the airport, the land on which Rendani Airport now stands was customary land owned by three Papuan tribes inhabiting the Manokwari area: the Arfak, Doreri, and Boray. To this day, these communities continue to seek compensation from the Indonesian government for the use of their land for the airport’s development.

Rendani Airport was initially constructed by Japanese occupation forces as a military airstrip during the occupation of the Dutch East Indies between 1942 and 1943, as part of the Pacific Theatre of World War II to support operations against Allied forces. It was built with a single runway parallel to the coast, along with taxiways and revetments. The airfield was considered strategic by the Japanese due to its location along the coast of Geelvink Bay, which made it a key chokepoint for Allied advances into the rest of the Dutch East Indies. It hosted one of the largest Japanese bases in New Guinea, with around 13,000 troops garrisoned there. In June 1944, in preparation for the landings at Noemfoor, the USAAF carried out raids on Manokwari airfield. Throughout the month, the 3rd Bombardment Group struck targets at the Manokwari, Jeymon, and Samate airfields near the tip of the Vogelkop Peninsula, as well as on Noemfoor. On June 16, forty-five B-25s—followed by another formation escorted by P-38s—destroyed most of the remaining Japanese aircraft at Manokwari airfield. Raids across the Vogelkop continued through the final week of June. Despite this, the Americans did not consider Manokwari a strategic target, as Allied Air Forces aircraft operating from nearby airfields on the Geelvink Bay islands, such as Biak and Noemfoor, could accomplish virtually the same missions as those based in Manokwari. Moreover, these islands could be secured at lower cost, and from them the Allies could effectively keep Japanese air and naval bases in the Manokwari area inoperative.

Following the end of the war, the airfield was handed over to the Dutch authorities. However, it had been heavily damaged during the conflict and was left inoperable, with its runway cratered by Allied air raids. Repairs by the Dutch colonial administration did not begin until 1952, and Rendani Airport was officially reopened to air traffic in April 1955. By 1961, De Kroonduif, a subsidiary of KLM operating in Netherlands New Guinea, was running services from Manokwari to its hub in Biak, with onward connections to Sorong, Kebar Valley, Ransiki, and Kaimana using the Douglas DC-3 Dakota. Following the New York Agreement in 1962, control of the airport was scheduled to be transferred from the Dutch authorities to the Indonesian government. Between August 1962 and early 1963, the airport also served as a temporary hub for the repatriation of Dutch citizens from Manokwari, with aircraft operated by KLM and De Kroonduif transporting them back to the Netherlands.

=== Modern era ===
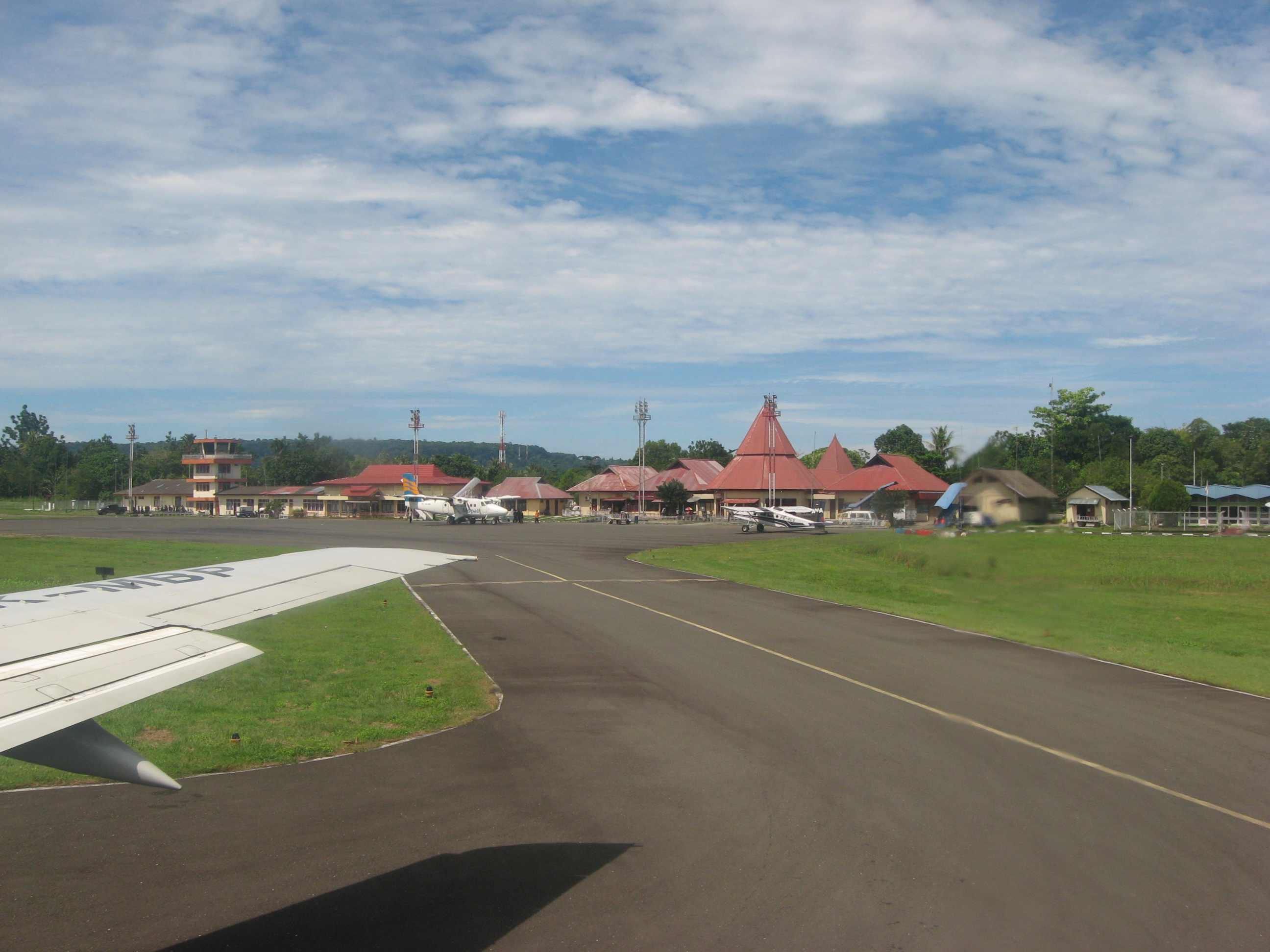
Former terminal of Rendani Airport, 2009

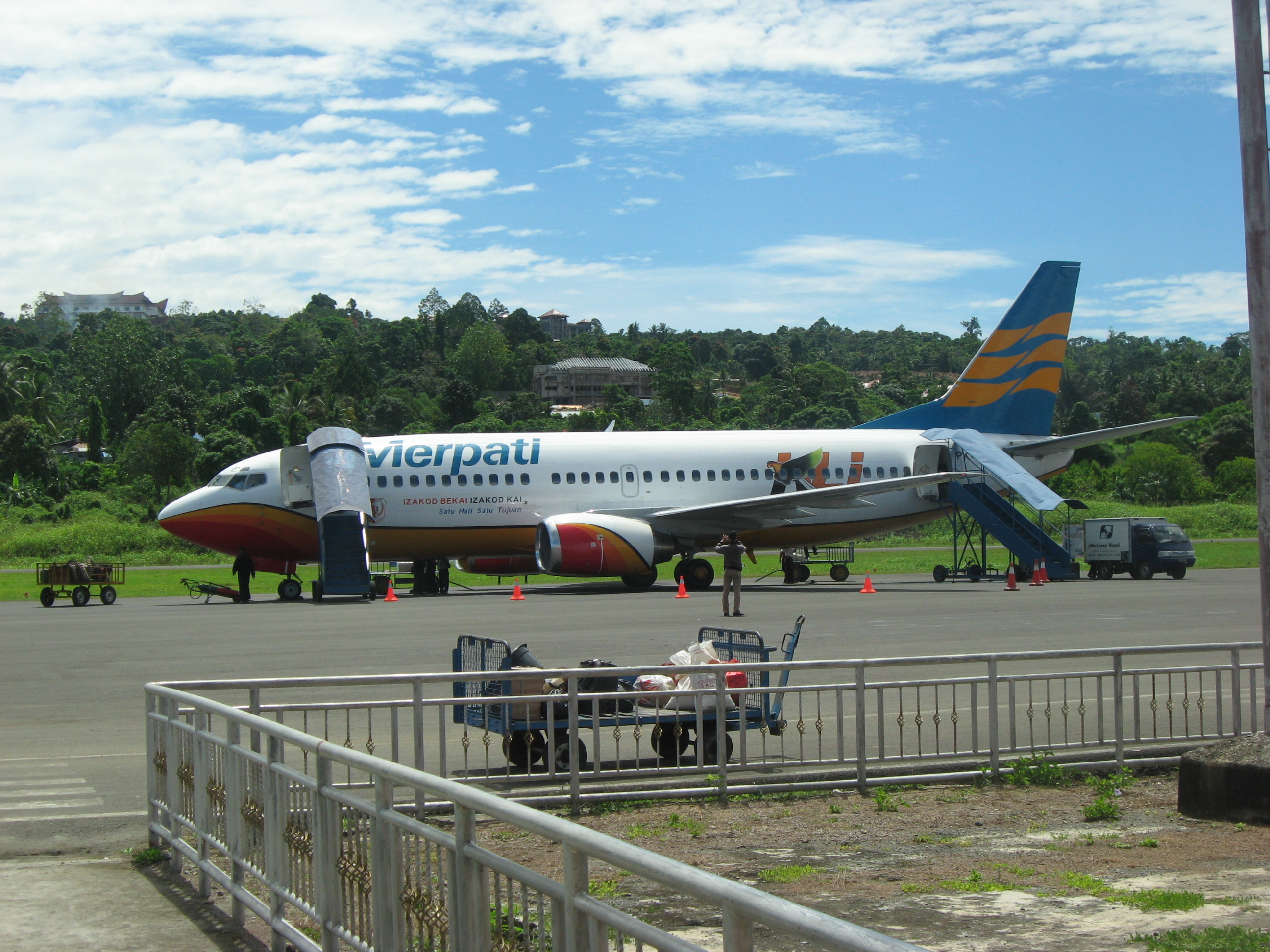
A Merpati Nusantara Airlines Boeing 737-300 at Rendani Airport, 2009

Following the integration of Western New Guinea into Indonesia, the airfield was handed over to Indonesian authorities. Between 1969 and 1970, unrest erupted in Manokwari due to the activities of pro-independence Papuan rebels who rejected the Act of Free Choice, resulting in damage to the airfield. It was subsequently rehabilitated in 1970 by the Indonesian Army Corps of Engineers. During this period, the airport began serving missionary flights to rural areas of West Papua, operated by organizations such as Mission Aviation Fellowship (MAF) and the Association Mission Aviation (AMA). In the 1980s, the airport also became a hub for Merpati Nusantara Airlines for its inter-Papuan network, serving major cities such as Jayapura and Sorong, as well as pioneer routes to Numfor, Ransiki, and Wasior.

Tensions frequently arose between airport authorities and local residents over the use of the airport. On 9 September 2013, all flights at the airport were cancelled after local residents blocked access to the facility due to a land dispute with the government, claiming that the airport had been built on their customary land. The residents demanded that the Governor of West Papua and the Regent of Manokwari immediately pay Rp 80 billion in compensation for the land. Further disputes arose in 2015 when local residents opposed the planned extension of the airport’s runway.

In 2025, a proposal was put forward to rename the airport Ottow–Geissler Airport, in honor of Carl Wilhelm Ottow and Johann Gottlob Geissler, two German missionaries who introduced Christianity to the people of Manokwari in the 19th century. The Manokwari Regency government has submitted the proposal and is currently awaiting approval from the Ministry of Transportation.

== Facilities and development ==
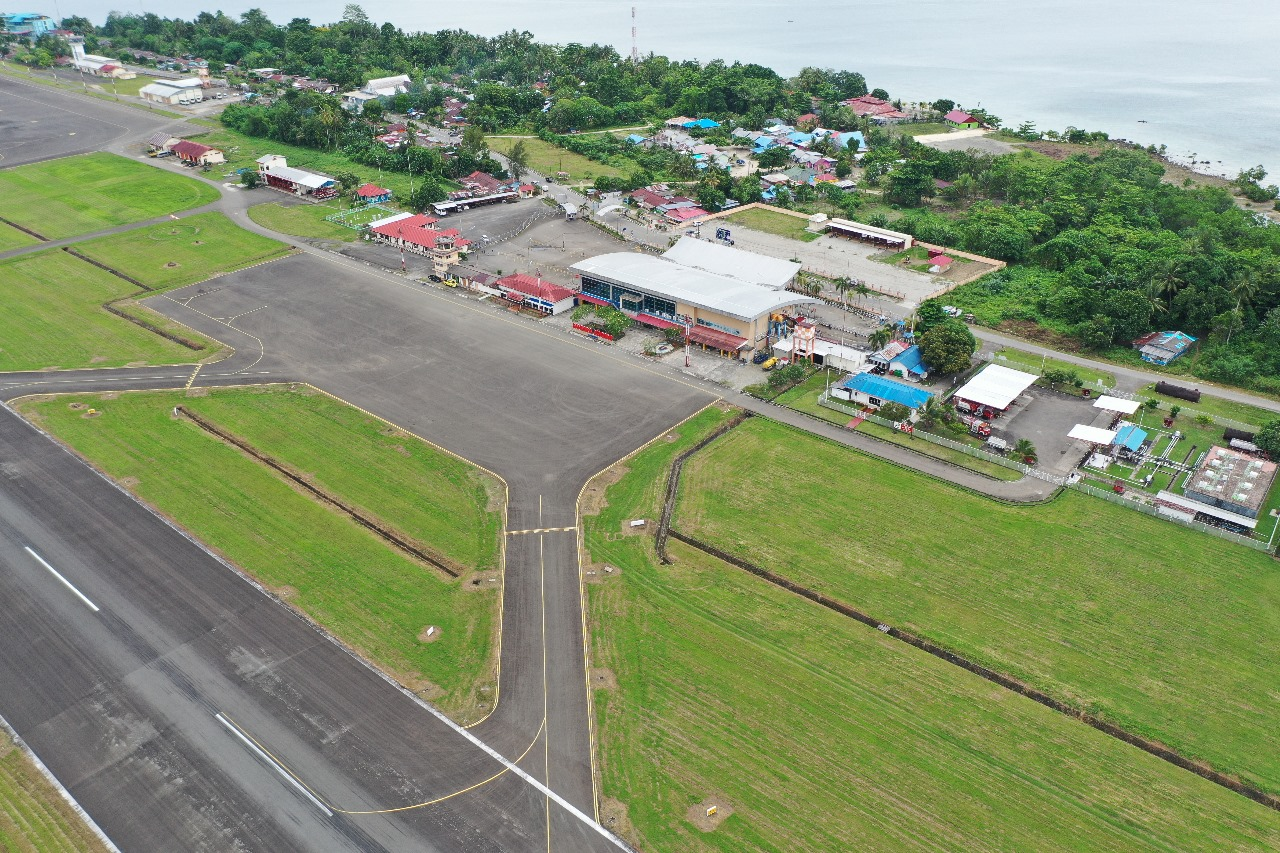
Aerial view of the airport

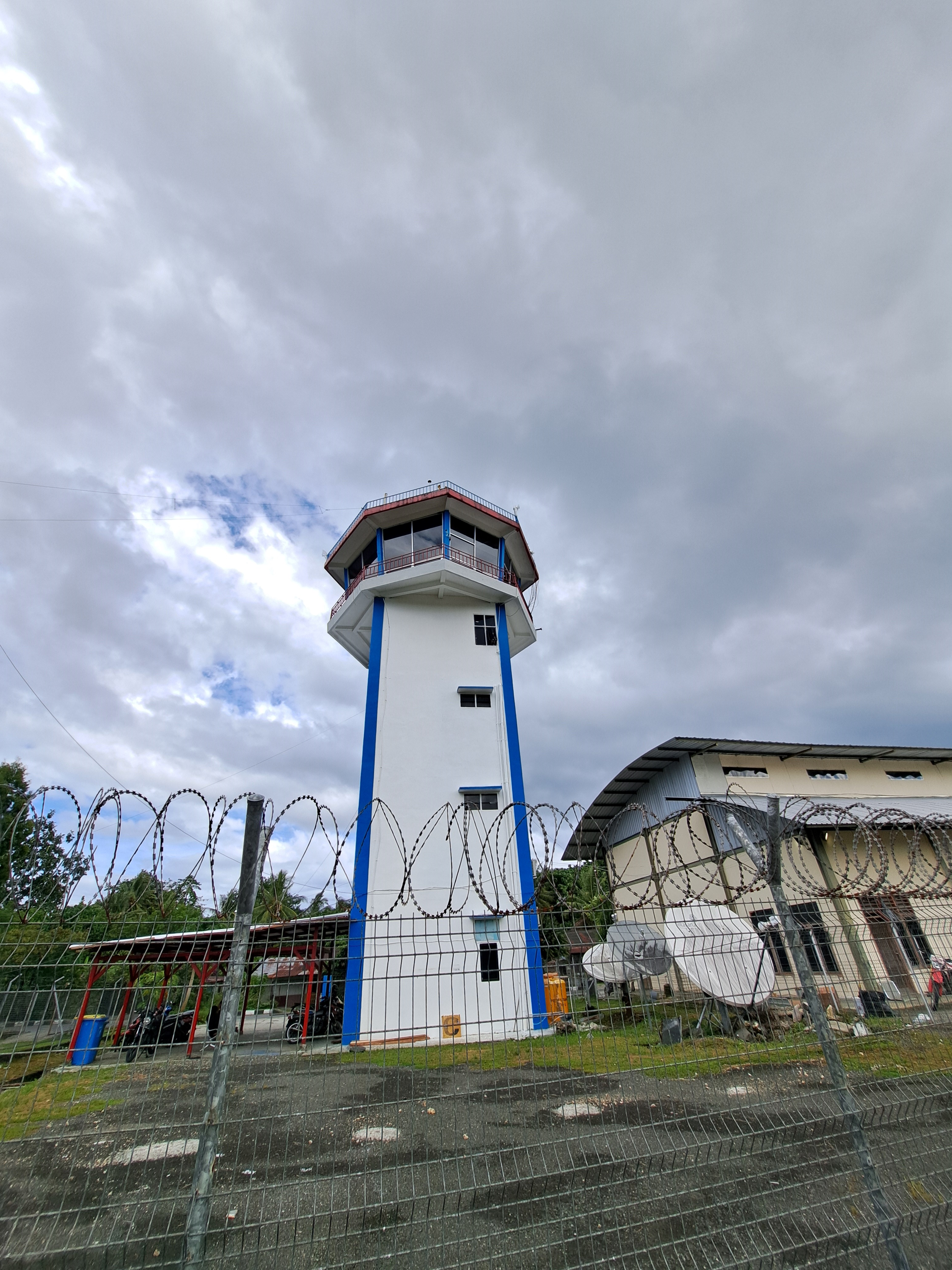
ATC tower

Currently, the airport has a single passenger terminal with an area of 4,359 m², capable of accommodating up to 612,857 passengers annually. It is also equipped with a 600 m² cargo terminal, aircraft rescue and firefighting (ARFF) facilities, and an administrative building measuring 453 m². A new passenger terminal is planned, with an initial area of 12,000 m², expandable to 18,000 m² in the future. The new terminal will feature a modern architectural design, with three jet bridges, and will also include additional supporting infrastructure. As of 2025, construction of the new terminal is still awaiting the completion of land clearing. In total, the construction of the new passenger terminal and its supporting facilities is estimated to cost around 7 trillion rupiah and will be supported by Chinese investment.

The airport has two aprons: one measuring 181 m × 68 m and the other 323 m × 85 m. The runway was extended from 2,000 m to 2,300 m in 2024, enabling the airport to accommodate narrow-body aircraft such as the Boeing 737-900ER and Airbus A320. The runway is planned to be further extended to 2,500 m and eventually up to 3,000 m in the future, enabling the airport to accommodate wide-body aircraft and compete with other airports in Papua, such as Sentani International Airport in Jayapura and Domine Eduard Osok Airport in Sorong. A new, larger apron and upgrades to the air navigation system are also planned.

In the future, the area surrounding Rendani Airport is planned to be developed into an aerocity. Proposed developments include hotels, convention centers, commercial facilities, and light industrial logistics hubs around the airport.

== Airlines and destinations ==
Airlines	Destinations
Batik Air	Sorong
Lion Air	Jayapura, Makassar, Sorong
Super Air Jet	Makassar
Susi Air	Anggi, Ayawasi, Babo, Bintuni, Kambuaya, Kebar, Merdey, Numfor, Teminabuan, Wasior
Wings Air	Kaimana, Nabire

== Statistics ==
Annual passenger numbers and aircraft statistics
Year	Passengers handled	Passenger % change	Cargo (tonnes)	Cargo % change	Aircraft movements	Aircraft % change
2006	252,870	Steady	1,685.47	Steady	5,834	Steady
2007	210,112	▼16.91	1,519.60	▼9.84	7,053	▲20.89
2008	113,778	▼45.85	11,982.02	▲688.50	6,090	▼13.65
2009	224,313	▲97.15	801.87	▼93.31	8,124	33.40
2010	325,606	▲45.16	902.29	▲12.52	8,617	▲6.07
2011	172,404	▼47.05	579.09	▼35.82	5,794	▼32.76
2012	336,374	▲95.11	818.58	▲41.36	7,019	▲21.14
2013	341,186	▲1.43	929.48	▲13.55	6,339	▼9.69
2014	446,494	▲30.87	1,648.63	▲77.37	9,328	▲47.15
2015	460,536	▲3.14	1,622.55	▼1.58	9,322	▼0.06
2016	525,158	▲14.03	1,563.32	▼3.65	8,884	▼4.70
2017	609,090	▲15.98	3,012.77	▲92.72	9,213	▲3.70
2018	711,179	▲16.76	2,849.56	▼5.42	10,302	▲11.82
2019	548,109	▼22.93	2,678.93	▼5.99	7,607	▼26.16
2020	342,778	▼37.46	2,712.17	▲1.24	4,651	▼38.86
2021	430,782	▲25.67	3,252.36	▲19.92	5,967	▲28.29
2022	475,406	▲10.36	2,627.31	▼19.22	5,527	▼7.37
2023	509,045	▲7.08	3,079.64	▲17.22	6,092	▲10.22
2024	476,804	▼6.33	2,986.46	▼3.03	6,129	▲0.61
^{Source: DGCA, BPS}

== Accidents and incidents ==
- On 13 April 2010, Merpati Nusantara Airlines Flight 836, a Boeing 737-300 (registered PK-MDE) overran the runway on landing. All 103 passengers and six crew escaped alive.
- On 31 May 2017, Sriwijaya Air Flight 570, a Boeing 737-300 operating from Sorong to Manokwari, skidded off the runway upon landing at Rendani Airport. There were no fatalities among the 146 passengers; however, one child sustained a broken bone.
- On 13 March 2018, the right landing gear of Batik Air Flight 6155, an Airbus A320 operating from Manokwari to Sorong, veered approximately 70 cm off the runway while turning during taxi in preparation for takeoff at Rendani Airport. None of the passengers or crew were injured; however, the airport was temporarily closed to allow for the safe evacuation of the aircraft.
