= Utarom Airport =

Airport in Kaimana, West Papua, Indonesia

Utarom Airport Bandar Udara Utarom
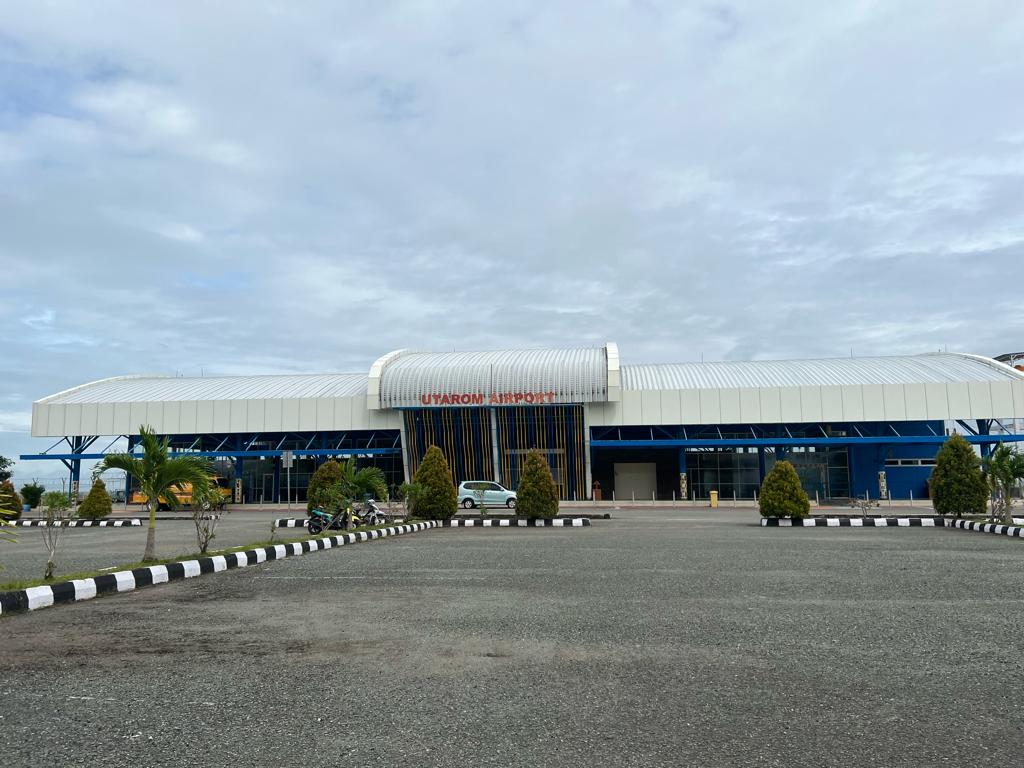
- IATA: KNG; ICAO: WASK

Summary
- Airport type: Public
- Owner: Government of Indonesia
- Operator: Directorate General of Civil Aviation
- Serves: Kaimana
- Location: Kaimana, Kaimana Regency, West Papua, Indonesia
- Time zone: WIT (UTC+09:00)
- Elevation AMSL: 19 ft (5.8 m)
- Coordinates: 03°38′40″S 133°41′43″E

Map
- Location in West Papua Location in Western New Guinea Location in Indonesia

Runways
Direction	Length		Surface
Direction	m	ft	Surface
01/19	2,000	6,562	Asphalt

Statistics (2024)
- Passengers: 38,765 (▲5.30%)
- Cargo (tonnes): 152.89 (▲7.92%)
- Aircraft movements: 1,592 (▲11.64%)
- Source: DGCA

Utarom Airport (IATA: KNG, ICAO: WASK), also known as Kaimana Airport, is a domestic airport serving the town of Kaimana in the province of West Papua, Indonesia. The airport is located about 7 km (4.3 miles) from the town center. The airport’s name is derived from a traditional Kaimana folktale, named by the former ruler of Kaimana, Raja Kumisi IV Achmad Aiturauw. The airport serves as the main gateway to Kaimana and the wider Kaimana Regency, particularly the western portion of the Bird’s Neck Isthmus and the southeastern part of the Bomberai Peninsula. Currently, it only handles short- to medium-haul inter-Papuan flights, including routes to Manokwari, Sorong, and Timika.

== History ==
=== World War II ===
Utarom Airport was originally constructed as a military airbase by the Japanese during the Pacific War of World War II. Development of the airfield began in 1942 to support Japan’s expansion into the South Pacific, Papua New Guinea, and Australia. For the project, the Japanese brought in romusha (forced laborers) from Java, along with local workers from the Kaimana area. To accelerate construction, the laborers were subjected to harsh treatment, including coercion, beatings, threats, and even killings. Swampy land was reclaimed, and trees were felled and transported entirely by manual labor. Workers from Java were directly supervised by Japanese soldiers, while Papuan laborers from Kaimana were placed under the authority of their local ruler, Raja Kumisi IV Achmad Aiturauw of the Kingdom of Kaimana.

After witnessing the mistreatment inflicted by Japanese troops, the king personally intervened to oversee his people. Under his supervision, Papuan forced laborers received relatively better treatment. The Japanese also showed respect to the king, granting several of his demands, including the provision of food and allowing the workers to operate without direct oversight from Japanese soldiers. Of the approximately 600 romusha brought from Java, only around 60 remained by the end of the airport’s construction. Six months later, in June 1943, the airfield was already capable of accommodating Japanese military aircraft. The airport was named “Utarom” by Raja Kumisi IV Achmad Aiturauw, with “Utarom” meaning hope or belief in independence, according to a legend preserved in Kaimana folklore.

=== Dutch era ===
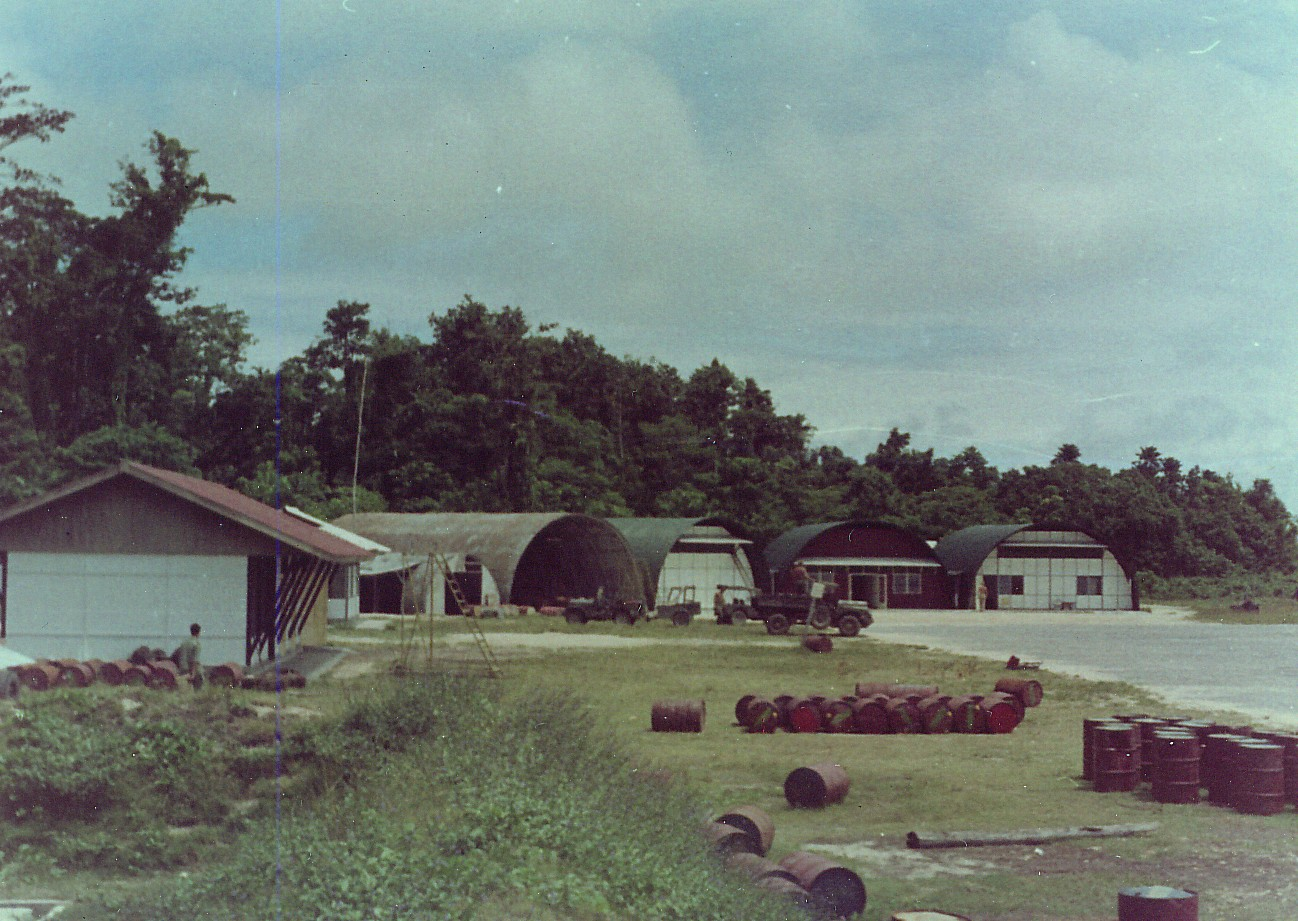
Utarom Airport in 1962, while it was still under Dutch control

Following the Japanese surrender in 1945, the Dutch returned to Kaimana in 1946 and found the airport heavily damaged by Allied bombing. The airfield was subsequently rehabilitated, enabling Allied aircraft to resume operations. In 1949, the Round Table Conference (KMB) was held in The Hague, during which the status of Western New Guinea became a point of dispute, as the Netherlands sought to retain control over parts of its former colony. In 1950, the Dutch initiated large-scale redevelopment of the airport, converting it into both an airbase and a naval base for the Netherlands Armed Forces due to its strategic location and in preparation for a possible Indonesian invasion.

By 1961, De Kroonduif, a subsidiary of KLM operating in Netherlands New Guinea, was running services from Kaimana to its hub in Biak, with stops in Manokwari, Sorong, Kebar Valley and Ransiki using the Douglas DC-3 Dakota.

As relations between the Netherlands and Indonesia deteriorated in the early 1960s, particularly following President Sukarno’s launch of Operation Trikora to annex Western New Guinea, Dutch Royal Netherlands Air Force jet aircraft were placed on standby at the base. Meanwhile, Kaimana’s seaport was reinforced with Dutch warships in anticipation of a possible Indonesian incursion. However, in 1963, the Netherlands formally recognized Western New Guinea as part of Indonesia’s sovereignty, and Dutch authorities soon withdrew from Kaimana. Remnants of Dutch-era structures, including hangars, can still be seen around the airport.

=== Contemporary era ===
Between 1964 and 1970, Utarom Airport was the only airport in Fakfak Regency (prior to the establishment of Kaimana Regency) and the most well-equipped aviation facility in the region, aside from small grass airstrips in Kokonao and Akimuga. At the time, the airport was already capable of accommodating aircraft such as the C-130 Hercules, Pilatus Porter, and DHC-6 Twin Otter. From 1971 to 1990, the airport was designated as a pioneer airfield. In 1991, Pertamina and Mobil Oil established it as a home base for their operations. In collaboration with the government, these companies played a significant role in the airport’s development, and during this period, Utarom Airport became capable of handling larger aircraft such as the Fokker F-28.

As of 2025, the airport is facing issues related to coastal erosion, which have begun to threaten the safety and continuity of its operations. Strong sea waves have damaged and washed away sections of the concrete revetment and iron fencing along the coastal side of the airport, affecting an area of approximately 60 meters. The erosion has already encroached up to 15 meters into the airport grounds and is now only about 50 meters from the runway.

== Facilities and development ==
Due to increasing passengers, the airport was heavily modernized. The airport development has been done in stages, beginning in 2012, followed in 2014, and completed at the end of 2015. Currently, Utarom Airport has a modern passenger terminal design like that of Wamena Airport. Airport capacity has also been increased to accommodate 102 passengers during peak hours. The passenger terminal is made more comfortable in order to improve service to passengers. In total, the construction of a passenger terminal covering an area of 1,800 square meters costs around Rp 75.5 billion. The development of the airport was completed at the end of 2015 and was inaugurated by President Joko Widodo on 30 December 2016.

Kaimana Airport which is a third class airport now has a runway length of 2,000 m x 30 m, two taxiways, an apron area of 170 m x 60 m, and is able to accommodate planes such as the ATR 72-500. For the improvement of aviation safety, the airport is also equipped with new navigation equipment such as non-directional beacon (NDB), Doppler VHF omnidirectional range (DVOR), precision approach path indicator (PAPI), and the airfield lighting system (AFL).

There are plans to further extend the runway from its current dimensions of 2,000 m × 30 m to 2,500 m × 45 m in order to accommodate larger aircraft. In addition, due to limited space for further expansion, proposals have been made for land reclamation of up to 3,449 hectares.

== Airlines and destinations ==
Airlines	Destinations
Asian One Air	Fakfak, Timika
Smart Aviation	Nabire
Wings Air	Manokwari, Sorong

== Statistics ==
Annual passenger numbers and aircraft statistics
Year	Passengers handled	Passenger % change	Cargo (tonnes)	Cargo % change	Aircraft movements	Aircraft % change
2007	27,831	Steady	141.50	Steady	1,661	Steady
2008	20,021	▼28.06	19.98	▼85.88	1,482	▼10.78
2009	18,117	▼9.51	0.22	▼98.90	1,158	▼21.86
2010	3,523	▼80.55	N/A	Steady	632	▼45.42
2011	62,949	▲1686.80	7.53	Steady	3,429	▲442.56
2012	11,369	▼81.94	N/A	Steady	676	▼80.29
2013	53,000	▲366.18	10.51	Steady	1,820	▲169.23
2014	41,887	▼20.97	15.60	▲48.43	1,681	▼7.64
2015	38,732	▼7.53	2.79	▼82.12	1,491	▼11.30
2016	51,764	▲33.65	41.55	▲1389.25	1,420	▼4.76
2017	72,456	▲39.97	N/A	Steady	2,130	▲50.00
2018	70,037	▼3.34	N/A	Steady	1,591	▼25.31
2019	43,636	▼37.70	159.95	Steady	765	▼51.92
2020	16,116	▼63.07	87.19	▼45.49	292	▼61.83
2021	23,670	▲46.87	163.06	▲87.02	732	▲150.68
2022	32,905	▲39.02	72.87	▼55.31	1,287	▲75.82
2023	36,815	▲11.88	141.67	▲94.41	1,426	▲10.80
2024	38,765	▲5.30	152.89	▲7.92	1,592	▲11.64
^{Source: DGCA, BPS}

== Accidents and incidents ==
- On May 7, 2011, the Merpati Nusantara Airlines Flight 8968, an Xian MA60 aircraft operating the flight crashed off the coast of West Papua on approach to Kaimana Airport in heavy rain. There were 21 passengers and 4 crew on board the aircraft; all were killed.
