= Domine Eduard Osok Airport =

Airport serving Sorong, Southwest Papua, Indonesia

Domine Eduard Osok Airport Bandar Udara Domine Eduard Osok
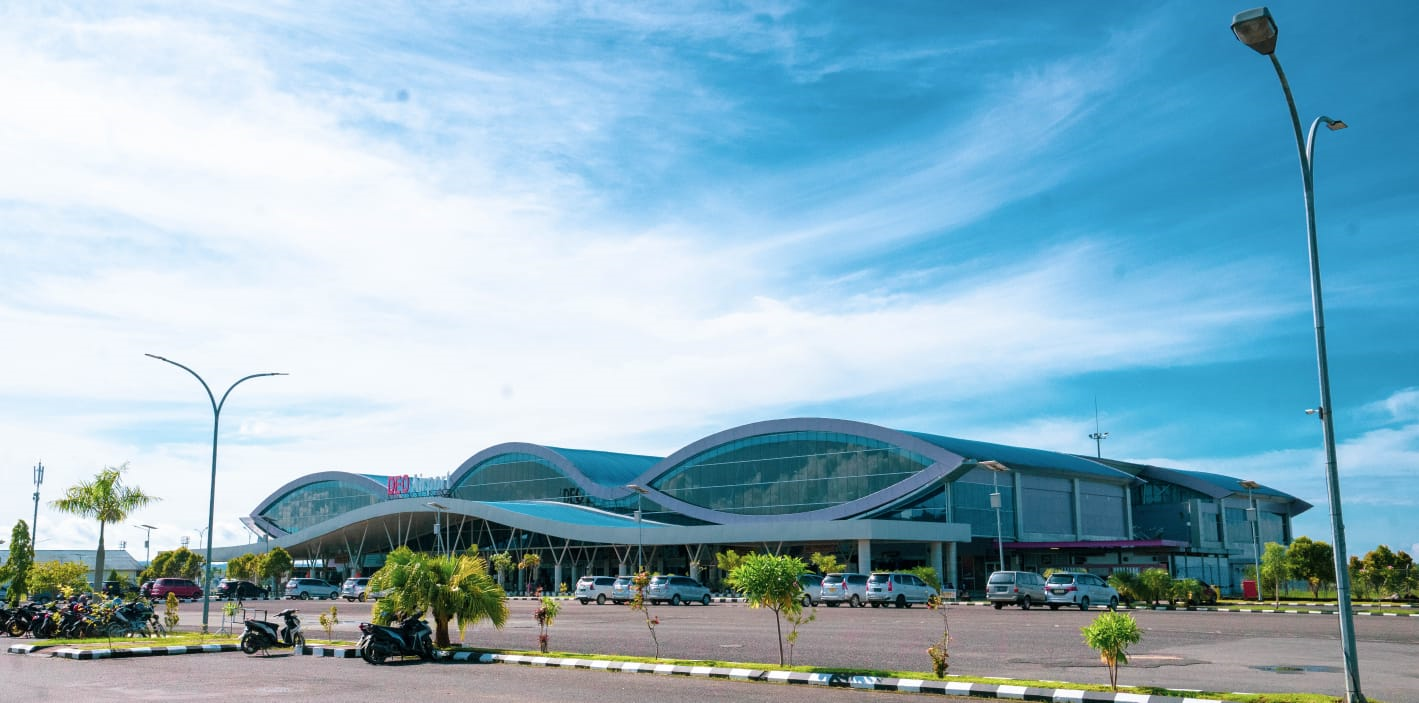
- IATA: SOQ; ICAO: WASS; WMO: 97502

Summary
- Airport type: Public
- Owner: Government of Indonesia
- Operator: Directorate General of Civil Aviation
- Serves: Sorong
- Location: Sorong, Southwest Papua, Indonesia
- Opened: 20 March 2004; 22 years ago
- Time zone: WIT (UTC+09:00)
- Elevation AMSL: 10 ft (3.0 m)
- Coordinates: 00°53′39″S 131°17′20″E

Map
- Location in Southwest Papua Location in Western New Guinea Location in Indonesia

Runways
Direction	Length		Surface
Direction	m	ft	Surface
09/27	2,500	8,202	Asphalt

Statistics (2024)
- Passengers: 1,673,446 (▲30.25%)
- Cargo (tonnes): 7,076.21 (▼3.14%)
- Aircraft movements: 13,276 (▼0.98%)
- Source: DGCA

Domine Eduard Osok Airport (IATA: SOQ, ICAO: WASS) is an international airport serving Sorong, the capital and largest city of the province of Southwest Papua in Western New Guinea, Indonesia. The airport is located approximately 8 km (5.0 miles) from Sorong's city center. It is the largest and busiest airport on the Bird’s Head Peninsula and serves as the main gateway to Sorong and nearby regions, including the Raja Ampat Islands. The airport replaced the smaller Jefman Airport, a former World War II airfield located on Jefman Island.The airport is named after Domine Eduard Osok, a pastor from Sorong who was known for his missionary work and for spreading Christianity in Sorong and surrounding areas. Domine Eduard Osok Airport is connected to major Indonesian cities such as Jakarta, Denpasar, Makassar, and Manado, as well as key cities in Western New Guinea including Jayapura, Timika, and Manokwari. It also serves rural flights to remote interior regions of the island, which are generally accessible only by air.

== History ==
=== Background and construction ===
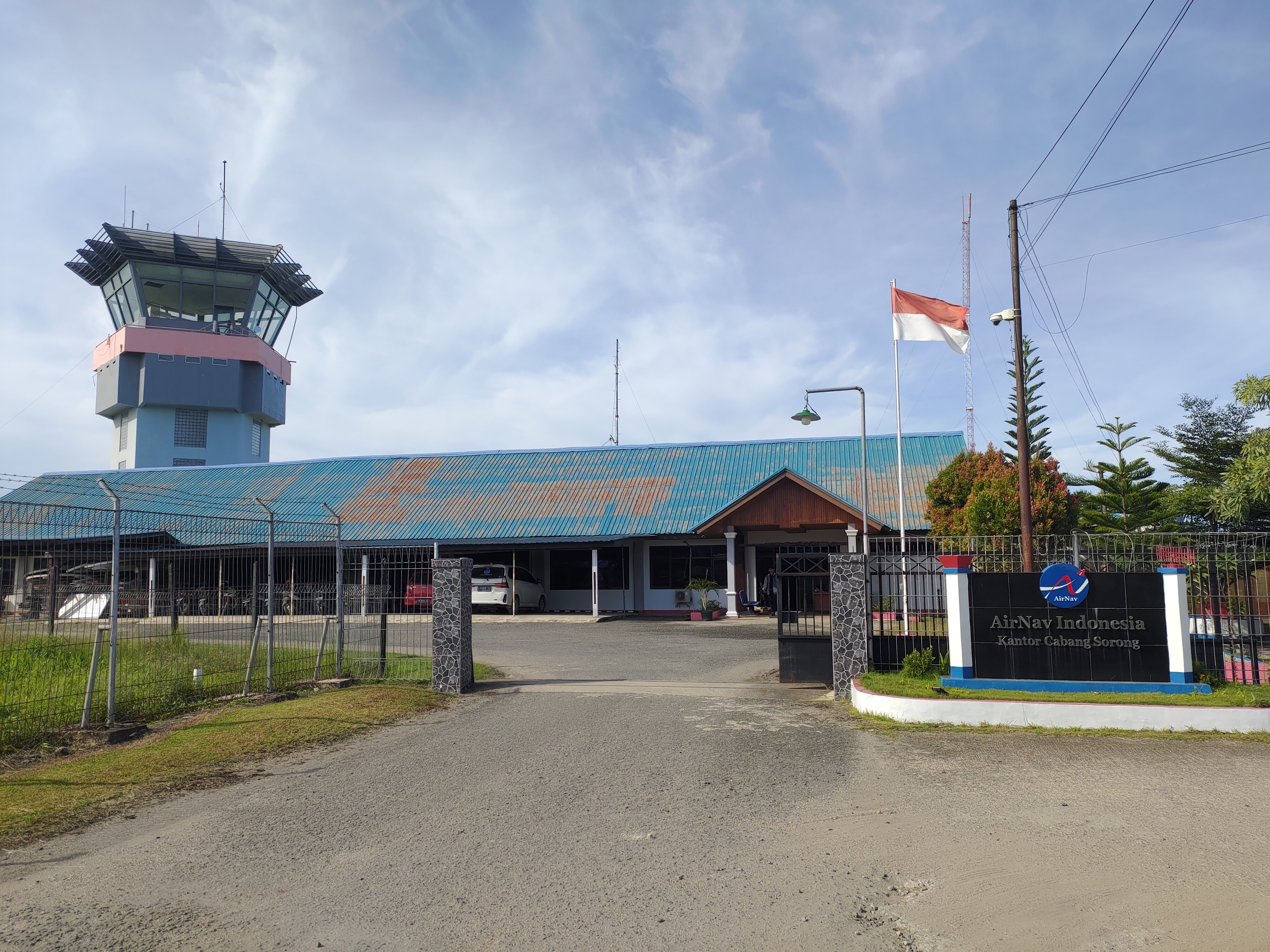
ATC tower

Before the current airport opened, Jefman Airport served as Sorong’s main airport. It is located on Jefman Island, approximately 16.7 km from the Port of Sorong. Built during the Dutch colonial era in the 1930s, it was originally constructed to transport gold and petroleum extracted from exploration activities in Klamano, under the auspices of the Nederlandsche Nieuw Guinea Petroleum Maatschappij (NNGPM). Over time, the airport suffered from severe overcapacity and could not be expanded due to limited land availability. With only a single 1,650 m runway, it could accommodate only small aircraft such as the Fokker F28. In addition, passengers had to travel by boat to reach Sorong, which takes around 30 to 45 minutes, making access to the airport time-consuming and inconvenient. To make matters worse, the airport’s approach was considered hazardous by pilots, as the airport was surrounded by the ocean on all sides. Even a slight miscalculation during approach could have resulted in an aircraft overshooting the runway and plunging into the sea.

Plans to construct a new airport to replace Jefman Airport had been under consideration since at least the 1990s, with then-Minister of Transportation Haryanto Dhanutirto emphasizing the difficulties and inconvenience of maintaining Jefman Airport. After years of planning, construction of the new airport began in 2002 and was completed in March 2004. The airport commenced operations on 20 March 2004, replacing Jefman Airport, which was subsequently closed and has since remained abandoned. The construction of the new airport cost approximately US$36 million. The new airport is expected to accommodate the growing number of passengers traveling to and from Sorong.

The airport is named after Domine Eduard Osok, a native of the Moi people who did not receive a formal higher education but was later ordained as a pastor and served in Papua. Known for his humility and simplicity, his name was subsequently given to Sorong Airport in his honor.

=== Contemporary history ===
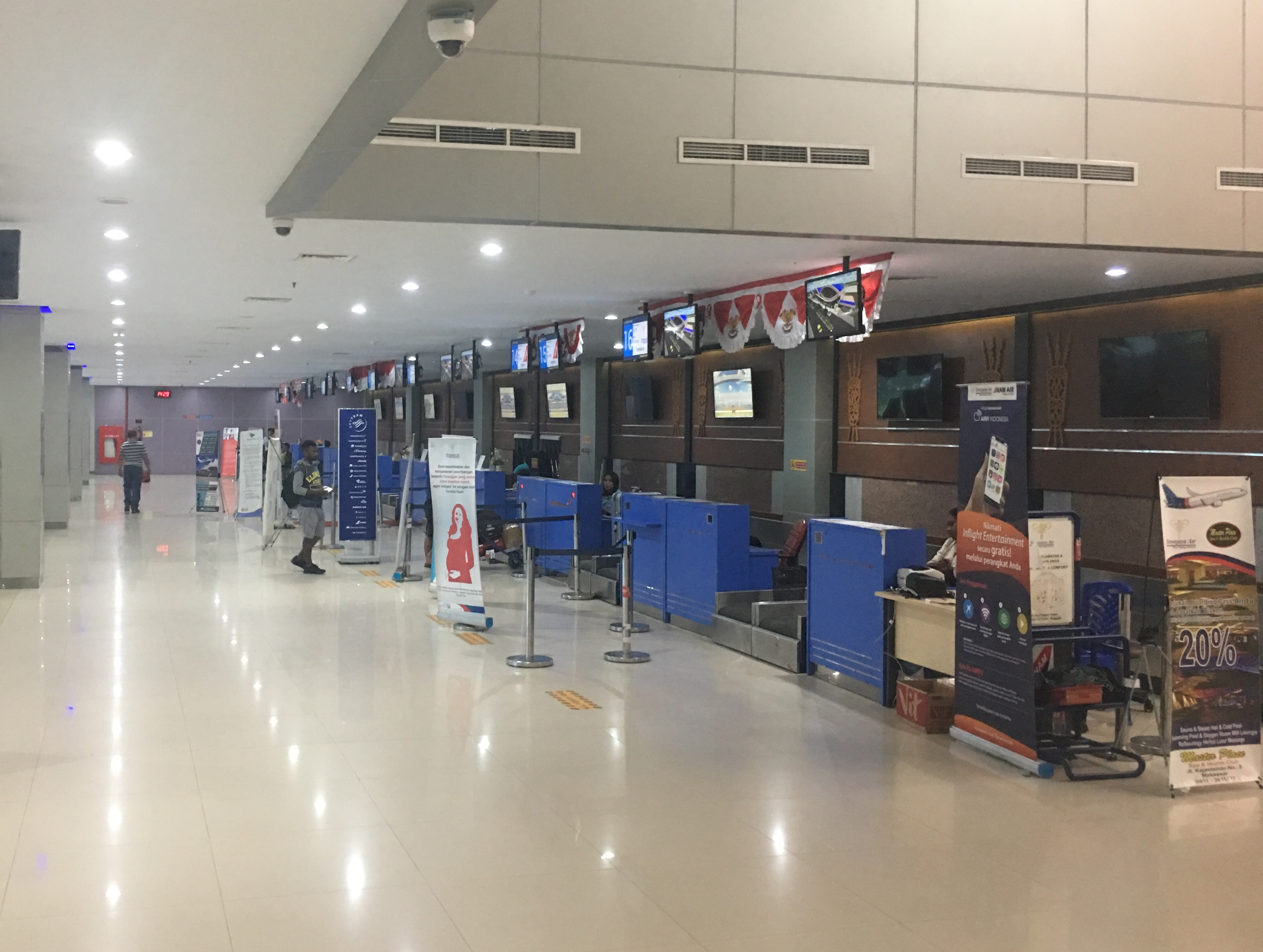
Check-in hall

The airport previously faced significant security and safety issues, as the airport premises were not adequately secured, allowing local residents living nearby to freely enter the airport grounds, including the runway. There were several instances in which aircraft were forced to execute go-arounds due to obstacles on the runway, including local residents crossing it on motorcycles. There were also frequent incidents of animals, including pigs and dogs, entering the runway area. The issue was largely mitigated in 2015–2016, when the airport authorities installed new fencing around the airport perimeter and, in cooperation with the Indonesian Army, began conducting regular patrols along the perimeter.

On 29 May 2013, local residents breached the airport compound and blockaded the runway, reportedly in protest over their alleged failure to receive adequate compensation for land used in the construction and development of the airport. This resulted in severe disruption to airport operations, with numerous flights to and from the airport being cancelled.

In August 2019, the airport was damaged by violent protesters following large-scale protests in Papua. Rioters breached the airport compound and proceeded to damage several vehicles in the car park, before entering the passenger terminal and destroying some of its facilities. The rioters were eventually driven out of the airport compound through a joint effort by airport authorities and law enforcement personnel. The incident led to the cancellation of numerous flights, with normal operations only resuming once the situation had become more conducive.

As an airport feeder, Domine Eduard Osok Airport serves domestic scheduled services operated by several airlines including Garuda Indonesia, Lion Air and Sriwijaya Air. In addition, the airport also serves pioneer destinations which are operated by Susi Air to some surrounding areas such as Ayawasi, Inawatan, Teminabuan, and Waisai. With a length of 2,500 meters and 45 meters wide, this airport runway can be landed by jet aircraft like the Boeing 737 series and the Airbus A320.

The airport was officially designated as an international airport by the Ministry of Transportation on 17 August 2025. Following this designation, plans are being considered to open international routes from Sorong to Australia and other Asia-Pacific countries.

== Facilities and development ==
=== Expansion ===
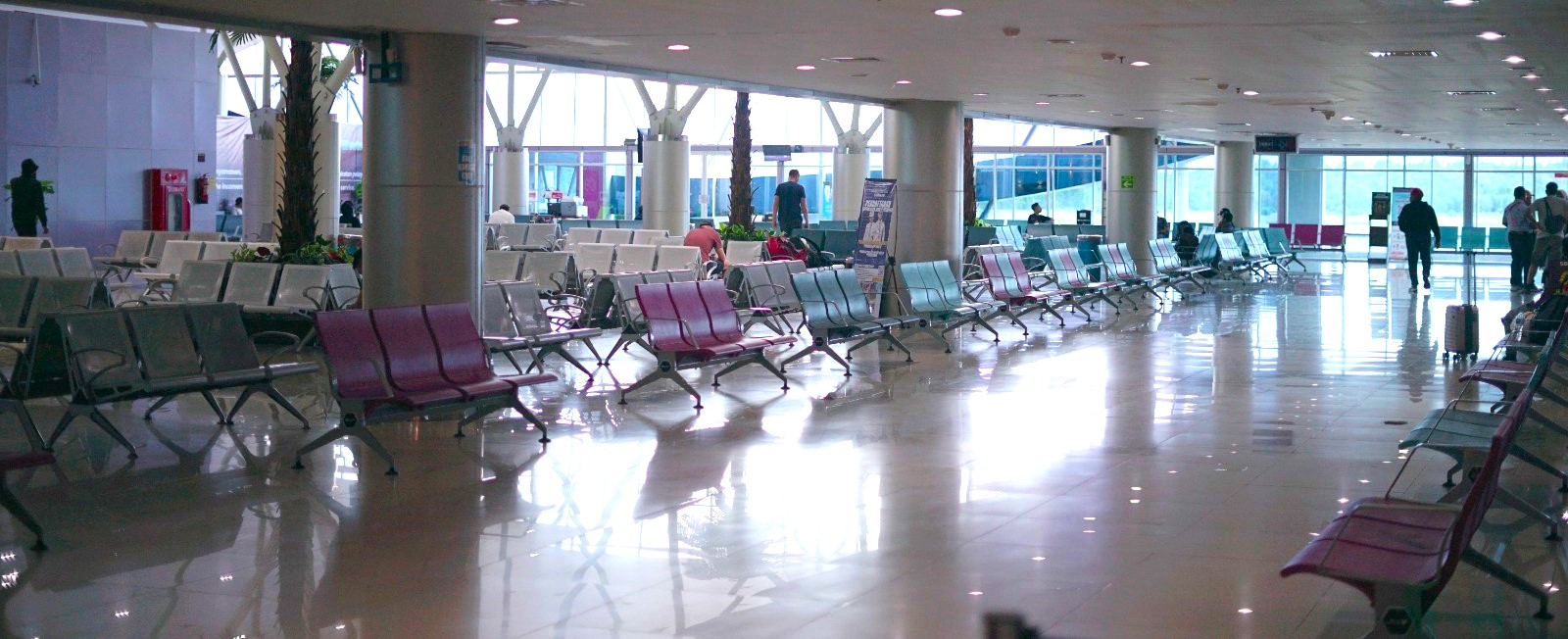
Boarding gate

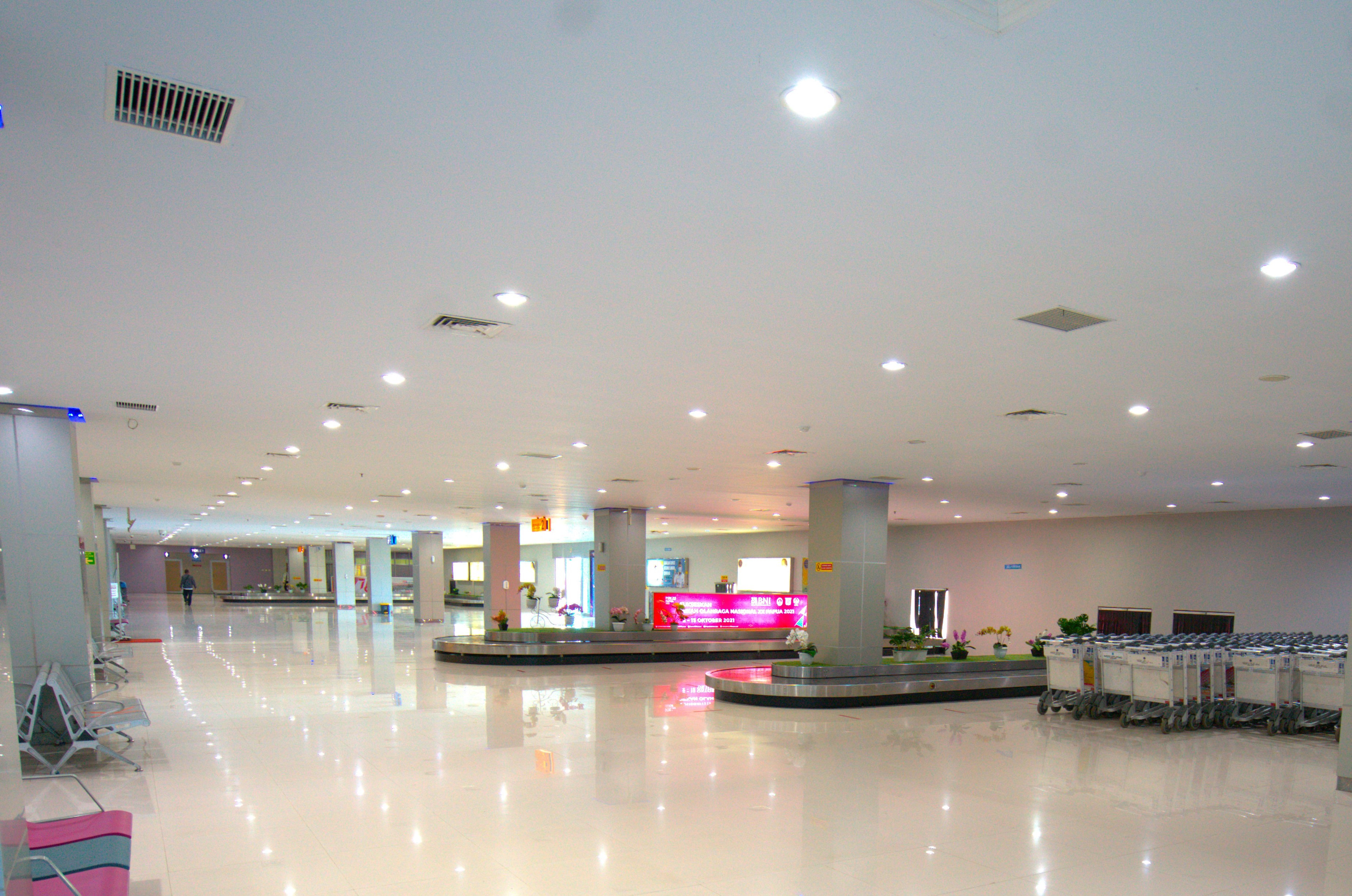
Baggage claim area

In 2013, the Directorate General of Civil Aviation allocated IDR 50 billion ($5.1 million) for runway width expansion to 45 meters from 30 meters. Due to overcapacity, the government has lengthened the runway to 2,500 m from 1,950 m so that the airport can accommodate Boeing 737 and Airbus A320. Expansion of the airport commenced in 2011 and finished in 2016. The expansion included the construction of a passenger terminal building into 2 floors, the installation of two new jet bridges and a fixed bridge, baggage handling system, terminal lift, luggage x-ray, multi-view cabin, walk-through metal detector, and addition of other facilities such as concession area and interior terminal design update. During that period, a total of approximately 236 billion rupiah from the state budget (APBN) was utilized. With the construction of a more modern and well equipped airport, air transportation services in Sorong and the surrounding areas are expected to improve significantly. In this way, Domine Eduard Osok Airport, as the gateway to Sorong City, can serve as a key driver in supporting the continued growth of Eastern Indonesia. The new terminal was inaugurated by President Joko Widodo and Transportation Minister Ignatius Jonan,

The exterior of the passenger terminal displays a unique form of ornamentation resembling betel nuts. The architecture design of Domine Eduard Osok Airport is designed to reflect the local culture. In addition, the interior has also been enhanced and equipped with facilities that add passenger comfort. With a passenger terminal building expanded to 13,700 m², the airport can accommodate up to 782 passengers per day. On the other side, the navigation facility will be improved in the future. AirNav Sorong also seeks to optimize the instrument landing system (ILS) to assist the landing. This would allow aircraft to land at the airport with ease and also allow the airport to serve night flights. AirNav Sorong is also currently installing a billing data system (BDS) and a billing cash system (BCS). The renovation of the air traffic control tower that was damaged due to an earthquake will also be part of the improvement of the airport's navigation system.

=== Future development ===
Due to the growing number of passengers traveling to and from Sorong, the current terminal—designed to accommodate only 1.2 million passengers annually—is already operating beyond its capacity. Plans are underway to expand the terminal from 13,700 m² to 14,000 m², increasing its capacity to up to 2.8 million passengers per year. The airport’s runway is also planned to be upgraded to accommodate wide-body aircraft such as the Airbus A330. The upgrade would include the construction of open drainage channels, rehabilitation of the runway strip, and installation of 8-inch underground pipes along both sides of the runway at depths determined by the runway’s structural specifications. These improvements are expected to increase the runway’s load-bearing capacity from the current 71 tonnes to approximately 78 tonnes.

== Airlines and destinations ==
Although the airport was upgraded to international status, it only serves domestic flights. However, the government is planning to begin international routes from this airport.

=== Passenger ===
Airlines	Destinations
Batik Air	Jakarta–Soekarno-Hatta, Manokwari, Timika
Garuda Indonesia	Denpasar, Jakarta–Soekarno-Hatta
Lion Air	Ambon, Jayapura, Makassar, Manado, Manokwari
Sriwijaya Air	Jayapura, Makassar, Nabire
Susi Air	Ayawasi, Inanwatan Kebar, Teminbuan, Waigeo
TransNusa	Manado, Timika
Wings Air	Babo, Biak, Fakfak, Kaimana

== Statistics ==
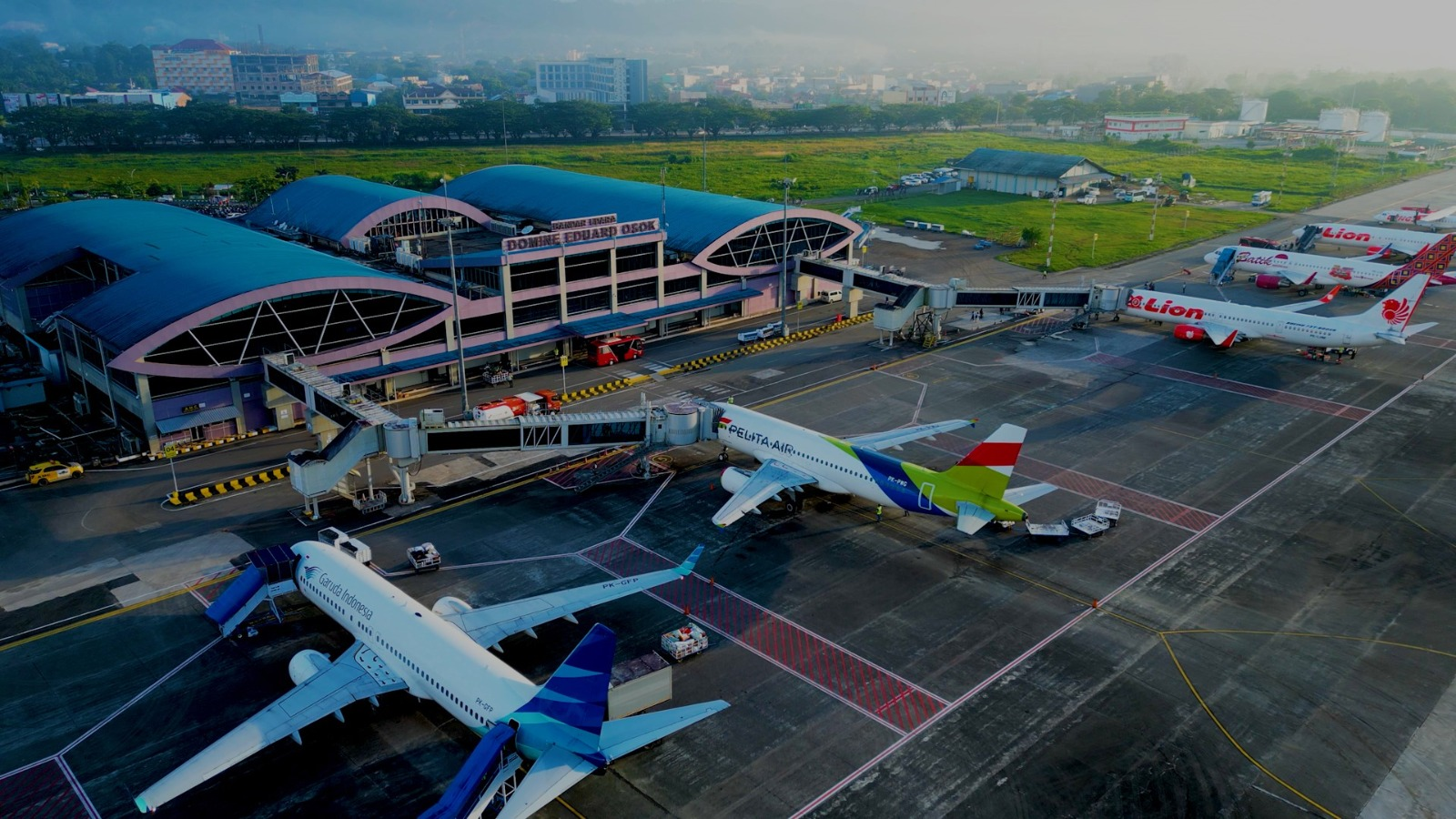
Apron view of Domine Eduard Osok Airport

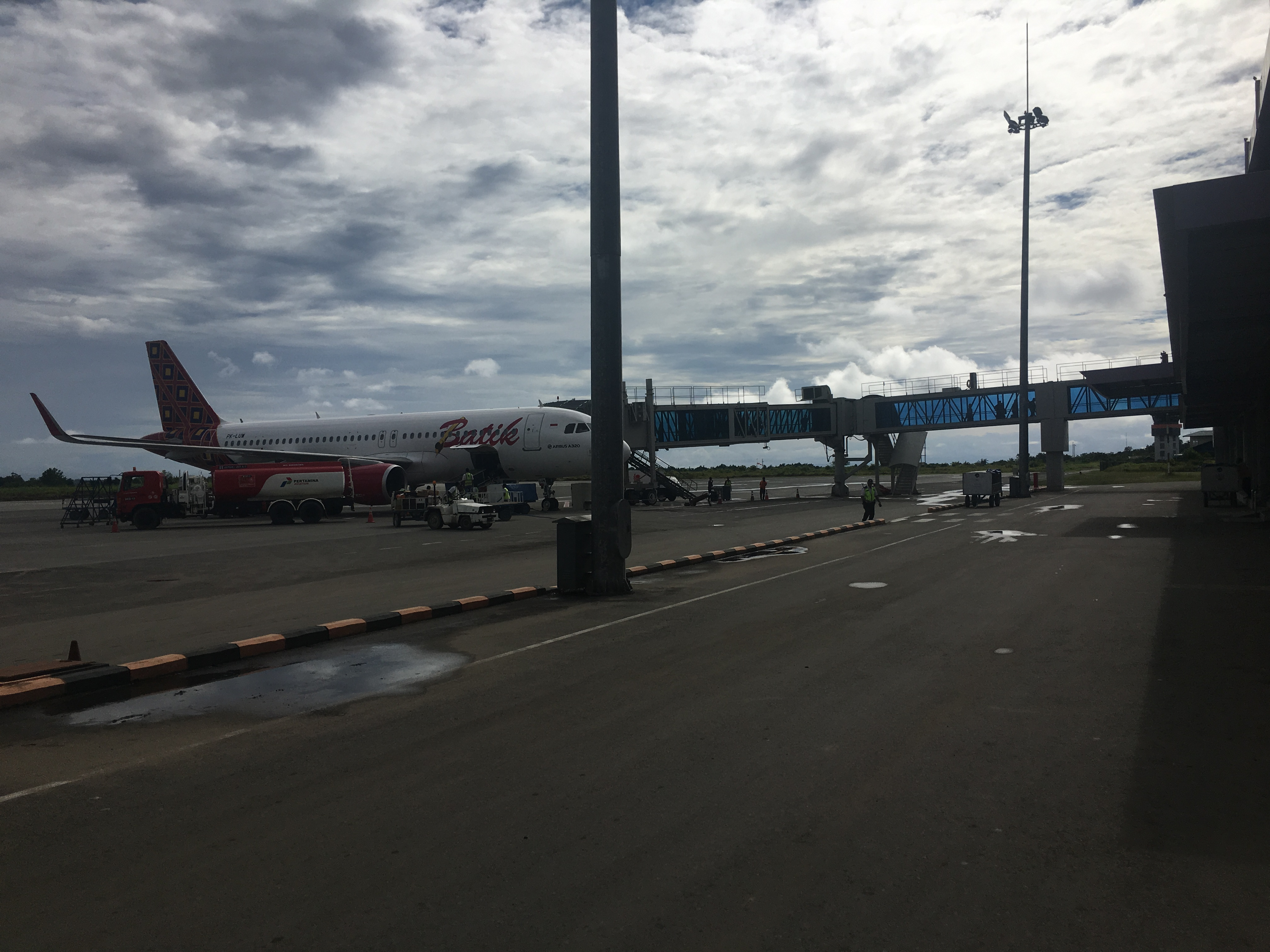
A Batik Air Airbus A320-200 at Domine Eduard Osok Airport

Annual passenger numbers and aircraft statistics
Year	Passengers handled	Passenger % change	Cargo (tonnes)	Cargo % change	Aircraft movements	Aircraft % change
2006	220,123	Steady	204.32	Steady	4,667	Steady
2007	167,933	▼23.71	373.91	▲83.00	3,117	▼33.21
2008	140,059	▼16.60	963.42	▲157.66	5,724	▲83.64
2009	292,792	▲109.05	817.27	▼15.17	6,694	▲16.95
2010	88,436	▼69.80	369.20	▼54.83	1,979	▼70.44
2011	774,947	▲776.28	1,854.10	▲402.19	14,836	▲649.67
2012	644,406	▼16.85	1,862.01	▲0.43	10,034	▼32.37
2013	568,100	▼11.84	2,028.78	▲8.96	9,138	▼8.93
2014	501,750	▼11.68	2,910.74	▲43.47	9,337	▲2.18
2015	824,941	▲64.41	3,584.29	▲23.14	13,244	▲41.84
2016	978,331	▲18.59	2,406.58	▼32.86	14,897	▲12.48
2017	1,240,887	▲26.84	1,911.54	▼20.57	18,124	▲21.66
2018	1,629,291	▲31.30	6,558.81	▲243.12	19,376	▲6.91
2019	1,481,163	▼9.09	5,736.61	▼12.54	17,549	▼9.43
2020	683,562	▼53.85	4,817.31	▼16.03	8,923	▼49.15
2021	758,795	▲11.01	6,146.89	▲27.60	9,498	▲6.44
2022	1,208,145	▲59.22	4,198.88	▼31.69	12,130	▲27.71
2023	1,284,824	▲6.35	7,305.30	▲73.98	13,408	▲10.54
2024	1,673,446	▲30.25	7,076.21	▼3.14	13,276	▼0.98
^{Source: DGCA, BPS}

== Accidents and incidents ==
- On 27 February 2019, Lion Air Flight 799, operating from Sorong to Manado on a Boeing 737-900ER, experienced problems with its pressurization and air-conditioning systems shortly after takeoff from Domine Eduard Osok Airport, prompting the aircraft to return to the airport. None of the 94 passengers or seven crew members were injured. A replacement aircraft was subsequently provided, allowing the passengers to continue their journey to Manado later that day.
