= Kaimana =

- Town (District)
- Location of the town in Indonesian Papua Location of the town in Indonesia
- Coordinates: 3°38′40″S 133°41′43″E
- Country: Indonesia
- Province: West Papua
- Regency: Kaimana Regency

Area
  - Total: 2,095 km^{2} (809 sq mi)

Population (mid 2022 estimate)
  - Total: 44,332
- Time zone: UTC+9 (WIT)

Kaimana is a district and a small port town in West Papua, Indonesia, and the capital of the Kaimana Regency. The district had a population of 44,332 in mid-2022, while the town had 16,718 and Krooy (the other kelurahan in the district) had 12,416 inhabitants.

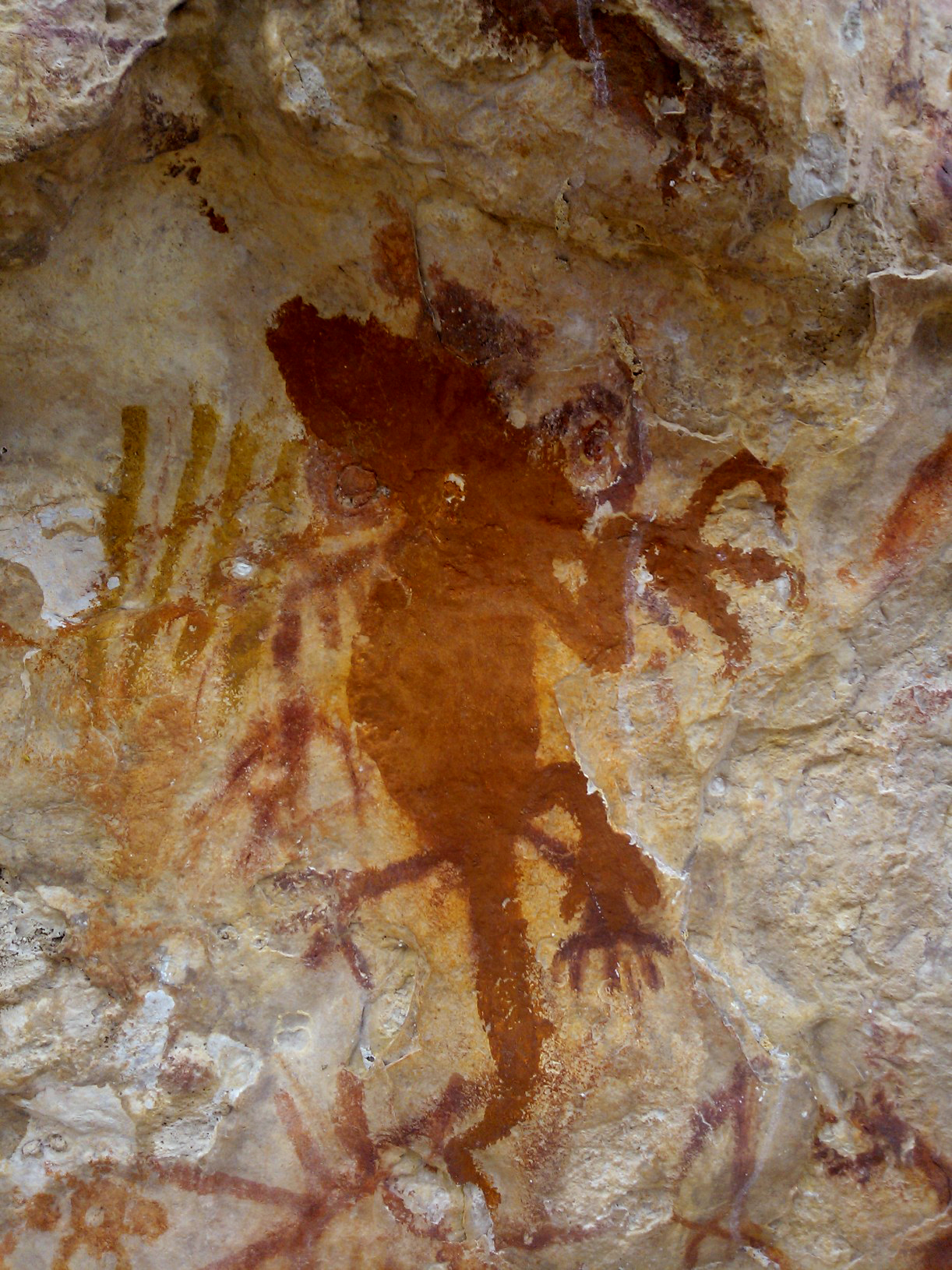
Kaimana lizard rock art

== Rock art ==
Ancient rock art in the district includes Mai Mai cliff drawings, Omborecena, Memnemba, Memnemnambe, and Tumberawasi sites in Kampung Mai Mai, Bitsjari cape drawings in Kampung Marsi, Werfora sites (I to IV) in Kampung Namatota, and Kamaka lake drawings.

== Transport ==
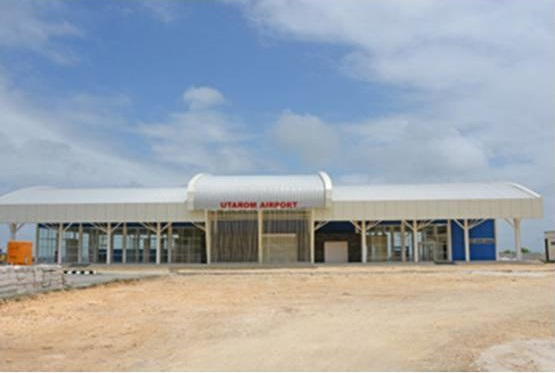
Utarom Airport

It is served by Utarom Airport.

== Environment ==
Kaimana is part of a Sea Conservation Area in West Papua. Butterflies in the surrounding forest of Karora are reported to be on the brink of extinction due to logging in the district.

Whales such as Bryde's whales are in nearby waters such as in Triton Bay.

== Climate ==
Kaimana has a tropical rainforest climate (Af) with heavy rainfall year-round.

Climate data for Kaimana (2000–2020)
| Month | Jan | Feb | Mar | Apr | May | Jun | Jul | Aug | Sep | Oct | Nov | Dec | Year |
|---|---|---|---|---|---|---|---|---|---|---|---|---|---|
| Mean daily maximum °C (°F) | 32.0 (89.6) | 32.1 (89.8) | 31.8 (89.2) | 31.4 (88.5) | 31.0 (87.8) | 29.5 (85.1) | 28.6 (83.5) | 28.4 (83.1) | 29.3 (84.7) | 30.6 (87.1) | 31.6 (88.9) | 32.0 (89.6) | 30.7 (87.2) |
| Mean daily minimum °C (°F) | 24.7 (76.5) | 24.6 (76.3) | 24.8 (76.6) | 24.7 (76.5) | 24.8 (76.6) | 24.4 (75.9) | 24.1 (75.4) | 23.9 (75.0) | 24.3 (75.7) | 24.3 (75.7) | 24.4 (75.9) | 24.9 (76.8) | 24.5 (76.1) |
| Average precipitation mm (inches) | 185.1 (7.29) | 161.9 (6.37) | 245.8 (9.68) | 224.8 (8.85) | 280.8 (11.06) | 183.0 (7.20) | 190.5 (7.50) | 136.6 (5.38) | 125.3 (4.93) | 194.7 (7.67) | 175.8 (6.92) | 162.8 (6.41) | 2,267.1 (89.26) |
| Average precipitation days | 15.0 | 13.6 | 15.2 | 15.3 | 12.7 | 12.3 | 10.7 | 10.5 | 9.9 | 10.2 | 11.4 | 14.4 | 151.2 |
Source: Meteomanz
