= Douw Aturure Airport =

Douw Aturure Airport Bandar Udara Douw Aturure
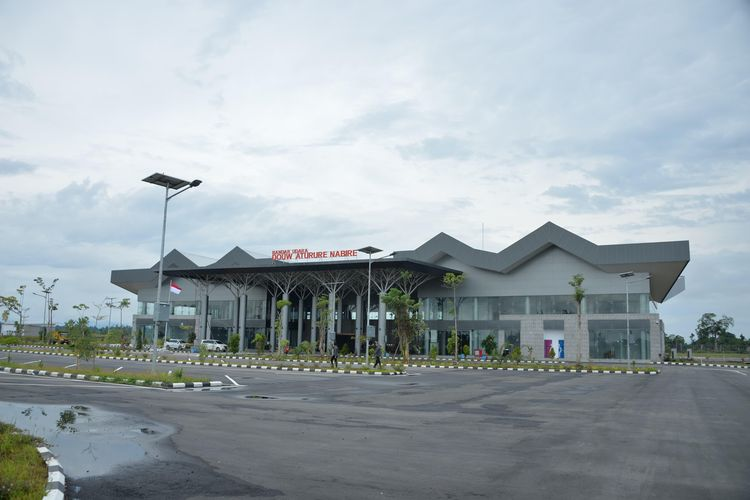
- IATA: NBX; ICAO: WABI

Summary
- Airport type: Public
- Owner: Government of Indonesia
- Operator: Directorate General of Civil Aviation
- Serves: Nabire
- Location: Wanggar, Nabire Regency, Central Papua, Indonesia
- Operating base for: Smart Aviation
- Time zone: WIT (UTC+09:00)
- Elevation AMSL: 6 m (20 ft)
- Coordinates: 003°24′2.7468″S 135°23′48.408″E

Map
- Location in Central Papua Location in Western New Guinea Location in Indonesia

Runways
Direction	Length		Surface
Direction	m	ft	Surface
18/36	2,500	8,202	Asphalt

Statistics (2024)
- Passengers: 225,264 (▲20.15%)
- Cargo (tonnes): 2,673.91 (▼16.59%)
- Aircraft movements: 13,116 (▲3.10%)
- Source: DGCA

Douw Aturure Airport (IATA: NBX, ICAO: WABI) is a domestic airport in Wanggar District, Nabire Regency, Central Papua, Indonesia. The airport began operations in 2023, replacing the old Nabire Airport (also known as Douw Aturure Airport) in Nabire District, which was located just a few hundred meters from the city center. The airport is named after Isaias Douw, a former regent of Nabire Regency, with “Douw Aturure” being a title bestowed by coastal tribes in Nabire. Located about 12 km (7.5 miles) from the city center, the airport serves as the main gateway to Nabire, the capital of Central Papua, as well as the surrounding regions. It also provides access to nearby tourist destinations such as Teluk Cenderawasih National Park. Currently, the airport serves flights to major cities such as Makassar, Jayapura, and Timika, along with pioneer routes to rural areas in the interior.

== History ==
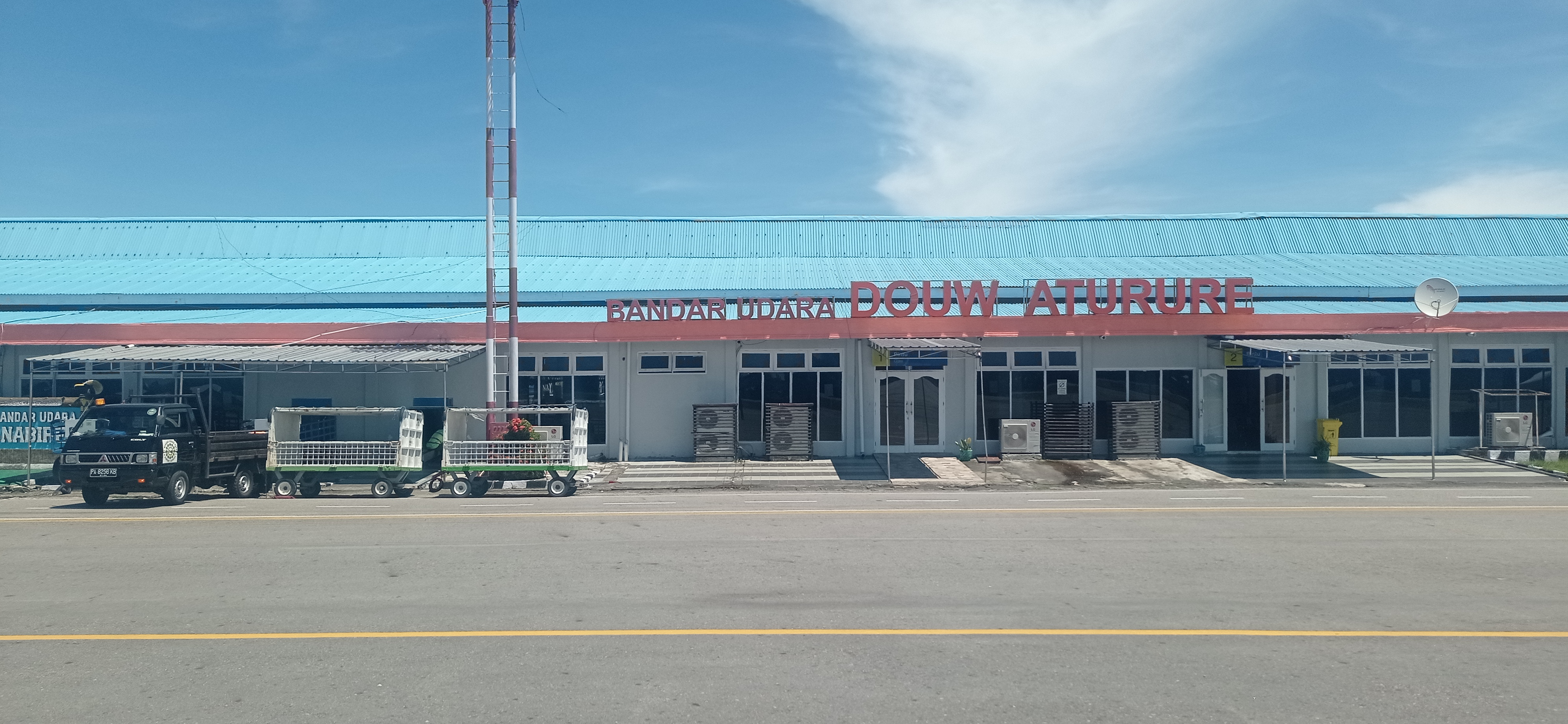
Former terminal building of Douw Aturure Airport prior to its relocation in 2023

The former Nabire Airport was built by the Dutch colonial government in 1941 during World War II, serving as a military base and a hub for mobilizing logistics for Dutch forces in anticipation of a Japanese invasion. Following the Dutch capitulation in 1942, the airbase was taken over by the Japanese and continued to function as a military base for their operations against Allied forces in the Pacific Theater. The Japanese considered Nabire a strategic airbase due to its location at the southern end of Geelvink Bay; however, only a limited number of aircraft were stationed there, and it was used primarily as a refueling stop. In 1944, the Japanese used the Nabire airstrip as a launch point for attacks against Allied positions on Biak and Owi to the north.

Following the end of the war, the airstrip was returned to Dutch control. In 1960, the Netherlands New Guinea authorities upgraded the airport to accommodate aircraft such as the Douglas DC-3 Dakota and the Twin Pioneer. The airport was subsequently handed over to the Indonesian government in 1963 following the New York Agreement, under which the Dutch recognized Indonesia’s sovereignty over Western New Guinea. To consolidate Indonesia’s control over the Nabire region and support the plebiscite on Indonesia’s rule in Western New Guinea, known as the Act of Free Choice, the government upgraded the airport’s infrastructure in 1969, including the construction of a new terminal and administrative offices. The project was completed and inaugurated in 1973 by the wife of the then Minister of Transportation, Emil Salim. Several airlines began pioneering flights in Nabire, including Mission Aviation Fellowship (MAF), which operated mission aircraft affiliated with Protestant churches. Another operator, Association Mission Aviation (AMA), was affiliated with the Catholic Church. Both organizations continue to operate in Nabire to this day, providing not only church mission services but also commercial flights.

On 21 October 1996, an Indonesian Army sergeant hijacked a de Havilland Canada DHC-6 Twin Otter cargo aircraft on a domestic flight from Obano to Nabire after secretly bringing a pistol on board. He ordered the pilot to divert to Manokwari so he could visit his family. The pilot agreed on the condition that the aircraft refuel in Nabire, where the crew escaped upon landing and the hijacker surrendered to police waiting at the airport.

On 23 April 2019, a building at the old Nabire airport caught fire. There were no casualties, and the operations of the airport following the fire were unaffected.

On 23 November 2023, President Joko Widodo inaugurated the new Douw Aturure Airport alongside Siboru Airport in Fakfak. Construction of the new airport took two years from 2020 to 2022. In total, the construction of the airport cost approximately Rp 671.54 billion, funded through the state budget (APBN).

The airport sustained damage from a magnitude 6.6 earthquake on 19 September 2025.

== Facilities and development ==
When the new airport began operation in 2023, it has a single runway with a length of 1,600 m and a terminal with an area of 6,320 m^{2}, capable of serving 289,700 passengers each year. The airport also includes a taxiway measuring 23 m × 165 m and an apron measuring 367.5 m × 100 m. The design of the terminal incorporates a local wisdom concept with modern stylistic elements. Its overall theme is inspired by trees, drawing from the tropical rainforests of Papua. The terminal roof design is also derived from the form of tropical forests, combined with elements resembling a paper airplane.

In 2025, the airport’s runway was extended from its original 1,600 × 30 m to 2,500 × 30 m, enabling it to accommodate narrow-body aircraft such as the Boeing 737-800, 737-900ER, and Airbus A320. This development allows airlines operating narrow-body aircraft, such as Batik Air, to begin opening routes to and from Nabire. Previously, the airport could only handle aircraft up to the size of the ATR 72. In the future, the runway is also planned to be widened from its current 30 m to 45 m. The current terminal is also planned to be expanded to approximately 11,000 m², with the capacity to accommodate up to 573,700 passengers annually.

== Airlines and destinations ==
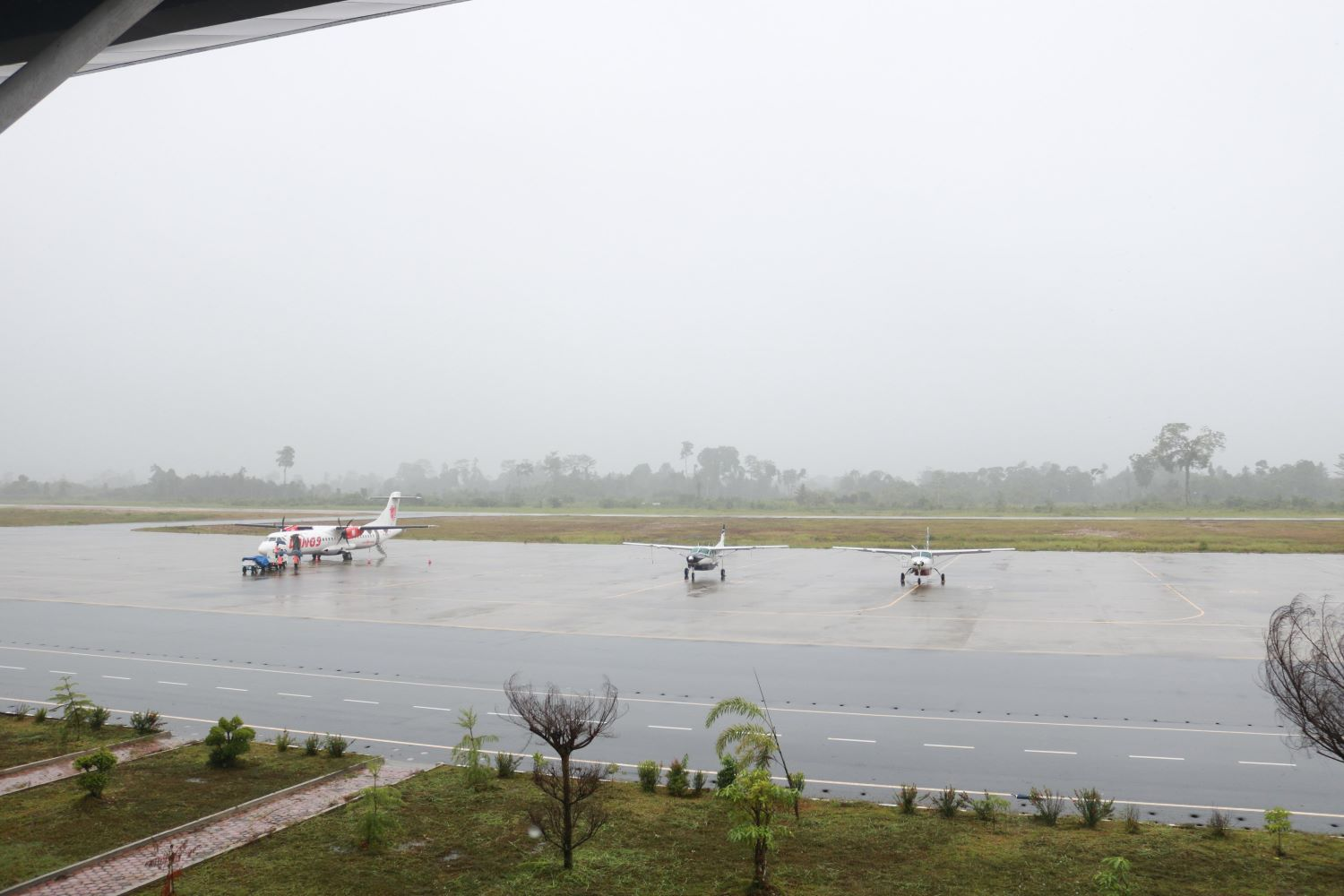
Apron view

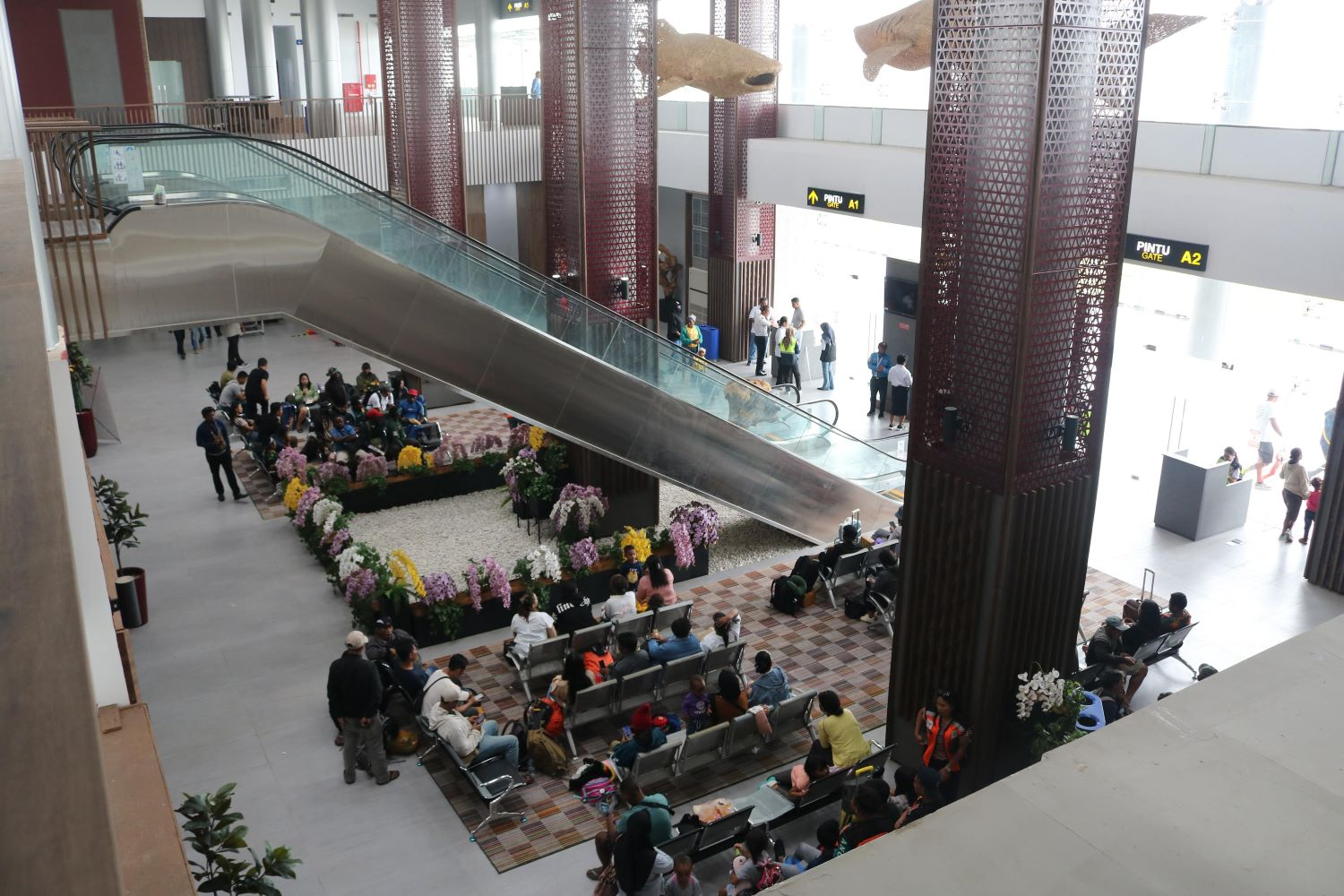
Boarding gate

The following destinations are served from Douw Aturure Airport:

Airlines	Destinations
Batik Air	Ambon
Sriwijaya Air	Jayapura, Makassar
Smart Aviation	Bilorai, Beoga, Dagai, Enarotali, Faowi, Illu, Ilaga, Kaimana, Mulia, Moanamani, Pogapa, Sinak, Wasior, Waghete
Wings Air	Jayapura, Manokwari, Timika

== Statistics ==
Annual passenger numbers and aircraft statistics
Year	Passengers handled	Passenger % change	Cargo (tonnes)	Cargo % change	Aircraft movements	Aircraft % change
2006	32,042	Steady	1,456.50	Steady	14,023	Steady
2007	38,666	▲20.67	192.47	▼86.79	11,556	▼17.59
2008	61,327	▲58.61	3,124.23	▲1523.23	14,656	▲26.83
2009	54,473	▼11.18	653.35	▼79.09	15,166	▲3.48
2010	61,365	▲12.65	2,362.96	▲261.67	16,218	▲6.94
2011	80,099	▲30.53	3,260.65	▲37.99	17,201	▲6.06
2012	191,931	▲139.62	5,319.42	▲63.14	22,849	▲32.84
2013	133,448	▼30.47	5,445.27	▲2.37	22,620	▼1.00
2014	149,084	▲11.72	5,488.63	▲0.80	25,577	▲13.07
2015	141,106	▼5.35	4,973.85	▼9.38	22,549	▼11.84
2016	184,433	▲30.71	3,167.82	▼36.31	20,823	▼7.65
2017	200,447	▲8.68	1,986.11	▼37.30	18,407	▼11.60
2018	211,503	▲5.52	2,108.15	▲6.14	16,164	▼12.19
2019	225,749	▲6.74	3,923.12	▲86.09	16,294	▲0.80
2020	111,480	▼50.62	3,762.07	▼4.11	11,183	▼31.37
2021	162,210	▲45.51	2,990.64	▼20.51	12,070	▲7.93
2022	172,534	▲6.36	3,608.70	▲20.67	12,625	▲4.60
2023	187,483	▲8.66	3,205.65	▼11.17	12,722	▲0.77
2024	225,264	▲20.15	2,673.91	▼16.59	13,116	▲3.10
^{Source: DGCA, BPS}

== Accidents and incidents ==
- On 27 January 2026, a Smart Air Cessna 208B Grand Caravan, PK-SNS, crash-landed on a beach shortly after takeoff from the airport. All 13 occupants survive.
