= Uruangnirin language =

Austronesian language spoken in Indonesia

Uruangnirin
- Native to: Indonesia
- Region: West coast Bomberai Peninsula
- Native speakers: (400 cited 1983)
- Language family: Austronesian: Malayo-Polynesian (MP); Central–Eastern MP; Kei–Tanimbar; Yamdena–North Bomberai; North Bomberai; Uruangnirin

Language codes
- ISO 639-3: urn
- Glottolog: urua1244
- ELP: Uruangnirin
- Location within Western New Guinea Location within Maluku
- Coordinates: 3.45°S 132.75°E

Uruangnirin is an Austronesian language spoken on the islands of Tarak and Faor in the Sebakor Bay, West Papua. Some Kalamang people from the neighboring island of Karas speak it as a second language. The languages most closely related to Uruangnirin are Onin and Sekar of the Bomberai Peninsula.

Uruangnirin is an endangered language as the younger generations of its speakers are shifting to Papuan Malay, the local lingua franca, as well as Indonesian, the standard national language. It is spoken by about 400 people in the four villages of Tarak, Tuberwasak, Faur, and Kiaba, which are located in the Karas Islands.
