= Iha =

Iha may refer to:

== People ==
- Fabiano Iha, Brazilian mixed martial artist
- James Iha, American rock musician
- Iha Fuyū, Japanese scholar
- Yōichi Iha, Japanese politician

== Geography ==
- Kingdom of Iha, a pre-colonial polity on Saparua in the Moluccas
- Iha Castle, a Ryukyuan gusuku on Okinawa Island
- Iha Shell Mound, an archaeological site on Okinawa Island

== Linguistics ==
- Iha language, a Papuan language spoken on the Bomberai Peninsula
  - Mbaham–Iha languages
- Iha language (Maluku) or Saparua language, an Austronesian language spoken in the Moluccas

== See also ==
- IHA (disambiguation), several acronyms
