= Onin =

Onin may refer to:

- Ōnin, a Japanese era
  - Ōnin War
- Onin peninsula, on the Bomberai Peninsula of Indonesian Papua
- Onin language, an Austronesian language spoken on the peninsula
