= Siboru Airport =

Airport in West Papua, Indonesia

Siboru Airport Bandar Udara Siboru
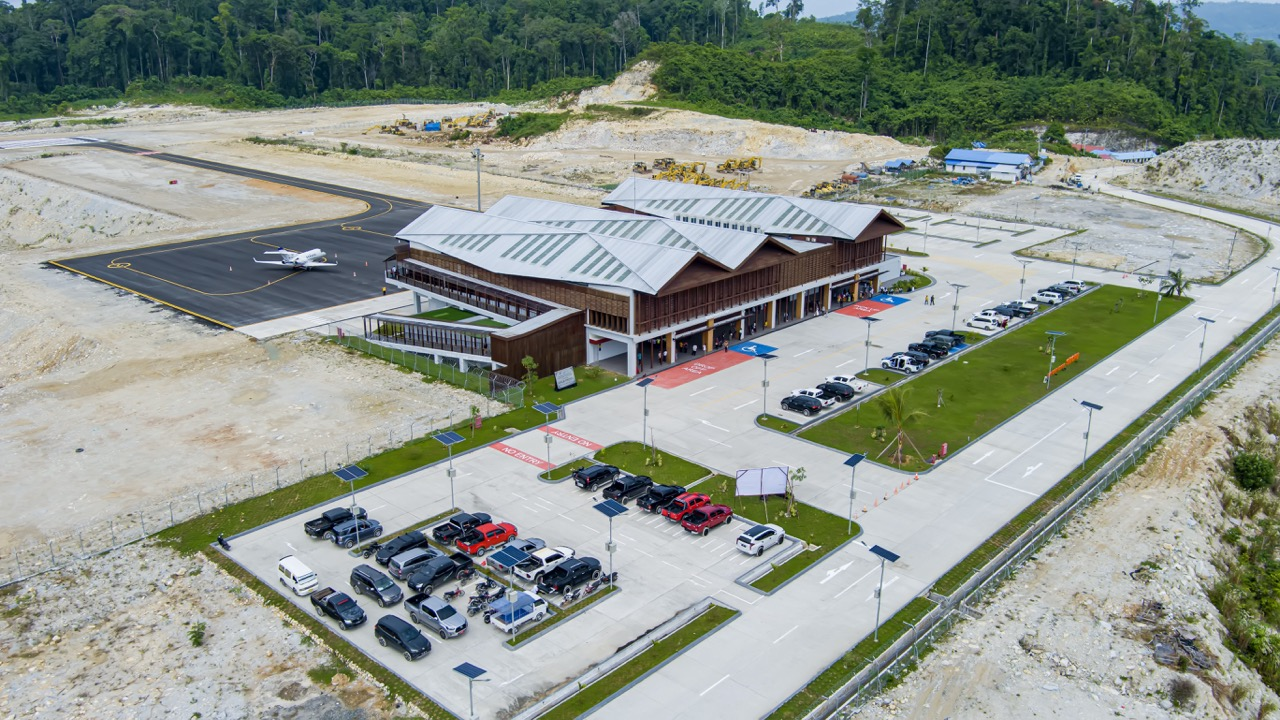
- IATA: FKQ; ICAO: WASF

Summary
- Airport type: Public
- Owner: Government of Indonesia
- Operator: Directorate General of Civil Aviation
- Serves: Fakfak
- Location: Wartutin, Fakfak, West Papua, Indonesia
- Time zone: WIT (UTC+09:00)
- Elevation AMSL: 110 ft / 33.5 m
- Coordinates: 2°55′43″S 132°5′19″E
- Website: www.bandarasiboru.com

Map
- Location in West Papua Location in Indonesian Papua Location in Indonesia

Runways
| Direction | Length | | Surface |
| Direction | m | ft | Surface |
|---|---|---|---|
| 15/33 | 1,600 | 5,249 | Asphalt |
- Source: Ministry of Transportation

Siboru Airport (IATA: FKQ, ICAO: WASF) is an airport serving Fakfak in West Papua, Indonesia. The airport began operations on 25 January 2024, replacing the old Torea Airport, which lacked sufficient land for expansion. The airport primarily serves inter-Papuan flights to major cities like Sorong and Manokwari, along with regional flights to rural areas.

== History ==
Construction of the airport began in December 2020 and was successfully completed in September 2023. This airport is one of the National Strategic Projects (PSN) with a contract value of IDR 832.5 billion for both the landside and airside works. The airport was built with the aim of improving connectivity and accessibility in the region, as well as supporting economic growth and tourism in the surrounding areas. The airport was inaugurated by President Joko Widodo on 23 November 2023, although formal operation only began on 25 January 2024.

== Facilities and development ==
Siboru Airport has an area of 5,000 m² and can accommodate up to 153,945 passengers per year. On the airside, the airport features a runway measuring 1,600 m by 300 m, a taxiway of 10.5 m by 206 m, and an apron spanning 92 m by 75 m. Currently, the airport can only accommodate ATR-72 aircraft. Plans are underway to expand the apron and extend the runway to 2,200 m, enabling it to accommodate Boeing 737 aircraft in the future.

To enhance access to the airport, the government plans to construct a new 26.15 km access road from the city, reducing travel time from 1 hour 30 minutes to just 45 minutes.

== Airlines and destinations ==
| Airlines | Destinations |
|---|---|
| Asian One Air | Kaimana |
| Smart Aviation | Amahai |
| Susi Air | Babo, Bintuni, Dobo |
| Wings Air | Sorong |
