= Bomberai languages =

The languages of the Bomberai Peninsula of Indonesian New Guinea fall into several groups:

- West Bomberai languages (Papuan, west and south)
- Irarutu language (Austronesian, most of the interior)
- North Bomberai languages (Austronesian, off the coast)
- Bedoanas–Erokwanas languages (minor Austronesian languages labeled 'Bomberai' in Ethnologue)
