= Mor language (Papuan) =

Papuan language

Mor
- Region: Fakfak Regency, West Papua
- Native speakers: 30 (2012); 70 semi-speakers (2012)
- Language family: Trans–New Guinea: Berau Gulf; Mor

Language codes
- ISO 639-3: moq
- Glottolog: morb1239
- ELP: Mor (Bomberai Peninsula, Indonesia)
- Map: The Mor language of New Guinea The Mor language Other Trans–New Guinea languages Other Papuan languages Austronesian languages Uninhabited

Mor is a nearly extinct Trans–New Guinea language of Indonesia. It is spoken along the Budidi River and the Bomberai River on the Bomberai Peninsula.

== Classification ==
It may form a tentative independent branch of that family in the classification of Malcolm Ross (2005), but Palmer (2018) classifies it as a language isolate. However, the only connections are the 1sg and 2sg pronouns na- and a-:

	sg	pl
1	na-ya	ne-a
2	a-ya	omase
3	mena	morimene

Usher classifies it with the other Trans–New Guinea languages of the Berau Gulf.

== Nouns ==
Nominal inflection for number in Mor is limited to only certain animate nouns, such as mor ‘man’ and mor-ir ‘men’. Other nouns do not inflect for number, such as is ‘bird/birds’.

== Vocabulary ==
The following basic vocabulary words are from Voorhoeve (1975), as cited in the Trans-New Guinea database:

gloss	Mor
head	idura
hair	sa
eye	nana
tooth	nasona
leg	bana
louse	twoa
dog	afuna
pig	bia
bird	isa
egg	utreta
blood	wabmina
bone	weten
skin	gina
tree	wara
man	hiamia
sun	seba
water	sea
fire	taha
stone	puata
name	inagenena
eat	masmore
one	nadu
two	kin

A word list of Mor has also been collected by Johannes Anceaux.
