= Baham language =

Trans–New Guinea language spoken in Indonesia

Baham
- Mbaham
- Patimuni
- Native to: Indonesia
- Region: West Papua (Bomberai Peninsula)
- Native speakers: (1,100 cited 1987)
- Language family: Trans–New Guinea: West Trans–New Guinea; West Bomberai; Mbaham–Iha; Baham

Language codes
- ISO 639-3: bdw
- Glottolog: baha1258

Baham, also rendered Mbaham, is a Papuan language spoken by the Mbaham–Matta people (primarily Mbaham) of the Bomberai Peninsula in West Papua Province, Indonesia. It is closely related to the Iha language.

== Distribution ==
Locations within Fakfak Regency:

- Fakfak Barat district: Werba, Wayati, Kwama, Kotam, Wanbar, Waserat, Sangram, Urat, Kriabisa, Tunas Gain, Saharei, Weni, Kinam, Kirawaswas, Wabu, and Was villages
- Fakfak Timur district
- Kokas district

== Pronouns ==
Baham pronouns (Flassy et al. 1987)

		personal	possessive
1st person	singular	anduu	ne
1st person	plural	unduu	ni
2nd person	singular	tow	te
2nd person	plural	kujuu	kuju
3rd person	singular	kpwaw	ka
3rd person	plural	kinewat	kinewaat
