= Fakfak Mountains =

Mountains in Indonesia

- Location within Western New Guinea Location within Indonesia

Highest point
- Peak: 1619 metres

Dimensions
- Length: 106 km (66 mi)

Geography
- State: Indonesia
- Range coordinates: 2.860063°S 132.532196°E
- Parent range: Island of New Guinea

The Fakfak Mountains (Indonesian: Pegunungan Fakfak) are located on the Bomberai Peninsula to the north of Fakfak in West Papua province, Indonesia.

== Geography ==
Topography includes the following top elevations in Fakfak Mountains:

- Baham at 613 m (coordinates 3.0719 ° S 132.6935 ° E )
- Gunung Weri at 537 m (coordinates 3.2098 ° S 132.7128 ° E )
- Patimun at 499 m (coordinates 3.0444 ° S 132.5228 ° E )
- Samai at 980 m (coordinates 3.1118 ° S 132.6206 ° E )

== Climate ==
Tropical rainforest climate prevails in the area. The annual average temperature in the area is 20 °C. The hottest month is November, when the average temperature is 21 °C, and the coldest is June, with 18 °C. The average annual rainfall is 3 217 millimeters. The rainy month is June, with an average of 438 mm rainfall, and the driest is October, with 167 mm rainfall.

== Flora and fauna ==
Fauna of the Fakfak Mountains includes the black-eared catbird and Oninia senglaubi, a member of the family of the narrow-mouthed frogs (Microhylidae).

Bird species recorded at FakFak Mountains:

- Papuan Eagle
- Papuan Pitta
- Vogelkop Bowerbird
- Black Berrypecker
- Little Shrikethrush
- Greater Melampitta
- Banded Yellow Robin
- Olive Flyrobin
- Island Leaf Warbler
- Capped White-eye
- Fairy lorikeet

Fakfak Mountains Nature Reserve, also known as Pegunungan Fakfak Nature Reserve, covers an area of 343.91 km^{2}.
