= WAPD =

WAPD may refer to:

- WAPD (FM), a radio station (91.7 FM) licensed to serve Campbellsville, Kentucky, United States
- Dobo Airport, Indonesia (ICAO code WAPD)
