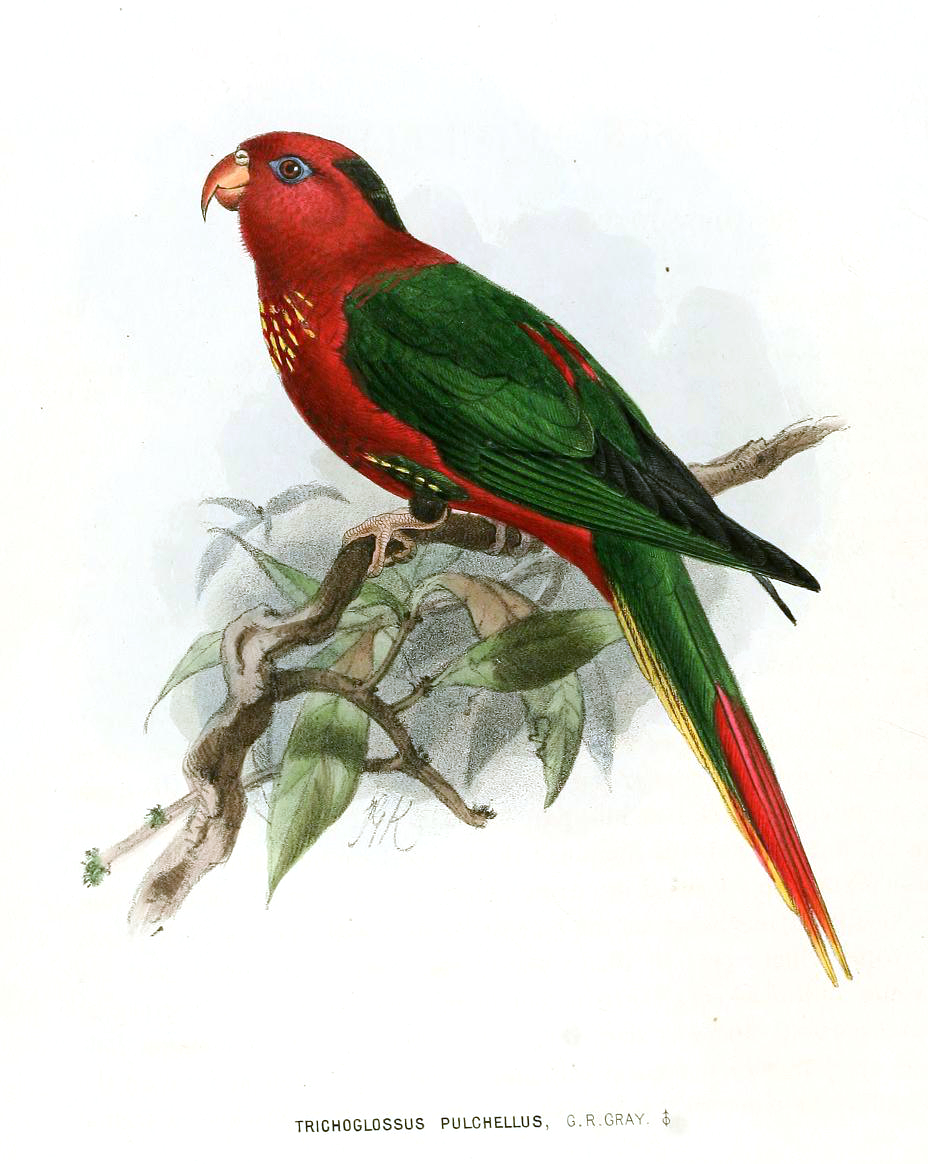

Conservation status
- Least Concern (IUCN 3.1)

Scientific classification
- Kingdom: Animalia
- Phylum: Chordata
- Class: Aves
- Order: Psittaciformes
- Family: Psittaculidae
- Genus: Charmosynopsis
- Species: C. pulchella

Binomial name
- Charmosynopsis pulchella (Gray, GR, 1859)

= Fairy lorikeet =

Species of bird

The fairy lorikeet (Charmosynopsis pulchella) is a species of parrot in the family Psittaculidae. Other common names include the little red lorikeet and the little red lory. Found in New Guinea, its natural habitats are subtropical or tropical moist lowland forests and subtropical or tropical moist montane forests. Its colouration is mainly red with some yellow on the throat and green on the wings. Two subspecies are recognised, C. p. pulchella and C. p. rothschildi.

== Taxonomy ==
The fairy lorikeet was formally described in 1859 by the English zoologist George Robert Gray under the binomial name Charmosyna pulchella. It was moved from the original genus Charmosyna to the resurrected genus Charmosynopsis following the publication of a molecular phylogenetic study in 2020.

== Description ==
The fairy lorikeet grows to a length of about 18 cm (7 in) and weighs between 24 and 34 g (0.8 and 1.2 oz). The male of the nominate subspecies, C. p. pulchella, has the head, nape, breast and underparts red, the breast sometimes being streaked with yellow. The back of the crown has a purplish spot. The mantle, back and wings are dark green, as are the upper tail coverts. The upper side of the tail is green tipped with yellow and the central tail feathers are red towards their tips. The underside of the tail is yellow and the thighs are dark purple. The beak is orange and the eye yellowish-orange. The female is similar but the lower back is yellowish-green and the sides of the rump and flanks are yellow.

The male C. p. rothschildi differs in that the breast is green streaked with yellow, while the dark spot on the crown is larger and extends forward to the eye and fades backwards into the green mantle. The upper tail coverts are washed with yellow and the belly is dark purple. The female has a wide green breast band streaked with yellow and a greenish-yellow patch on the side of the rump.

== Distribution ==
The fairy lorikeet is resident on the island of New Guinea. C. p. pulchella is present in mountainous regions from the Vogelkop Peninsula eastwards to the Huon Peninsula and the southeastern part of the island, as well as in the Fakfak Mountains in the Bomberai Peninsula. C. p. rothschildi is found in north and central New Guinea in the Cyclops Mountains and other nearby mountain ranges.

== Behaviour ==
The fairy lorikeet is assumed to feed on pollen and nectar foraged from flowers high in the forest canopy and is often associated with Melicope trees. Breeding has been observed in December, January and April. A nesting site is often a hole at the base of an epiphytic plant where a clutch of one or two eggs is incubated for about twenty five days.

== Conservation status ==
The fairy lorikeet has a wide range and is common in many places, though less so in other areas where it is collected for the pet trade. The population appears stable and the International Union for Conservation of Nature has assessed its conservation status as being of "least concern".
