= Patimburak Old Mosque =

Mosque in Fakfak, West Papua, Indonesia

- Masjid Tua Patimburak
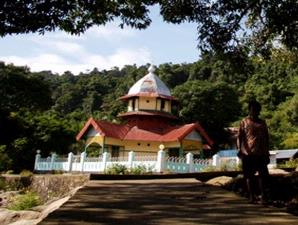

Religion
- Affiliation: Islam
- Branch/tradition: Sunni

Location
- Location: Fakfak, West Papua, Indonesia
- Interactive map of Patimburak Old Mosque
- Coordinates: 2.72288°S 132.42749°E

Architecture
- Type: Mosque
- Style: European-Islamic mix
- Founder: Raja (King) of Pertuanan Wertuar; Abuhari Kilian
- Completed: 1870

The Patimburak Old Mosque (Indonesian: Masjid Tua Patimburak) is a mosque located in Kampung Patimburak, Kokas District, Fakfak, West Papua, Indonesia. The oldest mosque in Fakfak Regency, the mosque is one of the historical legacies of Islam in Papua and has become one of the centers of Islam in Fakfak Regency.

== History ==
Patimburak Old Mosque was built in 1870. There are two versions of the person responsible of building the mosque: the seventh king of Pertuanan Wertuar and Abuhari Kilian, the first imam of the mosque.

During the colonial period, the mosque was hit by bombs by the Japanese army. This incident has left bullet holes in the pillars of the mosque.

According to Musa Heremba, the imam of the mosque, the spread of Islam in Kokas cannot be separated from the influence of the Tidore Sultanate's power in the Papua region. In the 15th century, the rulers of Tidore began to convert to Islam. Sultan Ciri Leliatu was the first sultan to embrace Islam. Since then, Islam began to develop gradually in the sultanate territory, including Kokas.

Musa Heremba said that the mosque building had undergone several renovations. Even though it maintains its original shape, the original material that has not been replaced is the four supporting pillars found in the mosque.

== Architecture ==
Patimburak Old Mosque is unique in its architecture, which is a combination of the shape of a mosque and a European-style church. Its European style can be found in the mosque's dome which resembles the roof models of European churches, its circular vents, and the wood on the mosque walls. There are also four supporting poles which are believed to be more than a century old which can't be separated from the influence of Islamic teachings. The distinctive hexagon-shaped building symbolizes the pillars of faith in Islamic belief as a foundation in religion, while the top of the dome is an octagonal shape symbolizing the eight cardinal directions, where the west wind is marked with mihrab as the direction of prayer in Islamic teachings.

In the courtyard of the mosque, there is a giant mango tree.

Patimburak Old Mosque was built by the local community of Pertuanan Wertuar in mutual cooperation as a demonstration of satu tungku tiga batu ("one furnace three stones") philosophy, which is a concept of tolerance between religious communities in Fakfak. The "three stones" is a symbol of the three major religions in Fakfak: Islam, Protestant, and Catholic. The three stones instituted a furnace and are placed in a circular and spaced manner.
