= Bedoanas language =

Austronesian language of Indonesia

Bedoanas
- Native to: Indonesia
- Region: N. coast Bomberai Peninsula
- Native speakers: (180 cited 2000)
- Language family: Austronesian: Malayo-Polynesian; Central–Eastern Malayo-Polynesian; Kei–Tanimbar; Bedoanas–Erokwanas; Bedoanas

Language codes
- ISO 639-3: bed
- Glottolog: bedo1237
- ELP: Bedoanas

Bedoanas is a minor Austronesian language of the north coast of the Bomberai Peninsula. Bedoanas speakers reside in the villages of Andamata, Fior and Furir in the Arguni District, Fakfak Regency.
