= Erokwanas language =

Austronesian language

Erokwanas
- Native to: Indonesia
- Region: North coast of Bomberai Peninsula
- Native speakers: probably under 200 (2007)
- Language family: Austronesian: Malayo-Polynesian; Central–Eastern Malayo-Polynesian; Kei–Tanimbar; Bedoanas–Erokwanas; Erokwanas

Language codes
- ISO 639-3: erw
- Glottolog: erok1237
- ELP: Erokwanas
- Coordinates: 2.84°S 132.71°E

Erokwanas is a minor Austronesian language of the north coast of the Bomberai Peninsula of Western New Guinea in Indonesia. Erokwanas speakers reside in the villages of Darembang and Goras in the Mbahamdandara District, Fakfak Regency.
