= IHA =

IHA may refer to:

Acronyms

- Ice Hockey Australia, Ice Hockey Australia
- Indonesia Handball Association, governing body of handball in Indonesia
- Idiopathic hyperaldosteronism, an endocrinological disease
- İhlas Haber Ajansı, the Turkish İhlas News Agency
- Immaculate Heart Academy, Catholic high school in New Jersey
- Imperial Household Agency, the Japanese government agency that oversees Royal affairs
- Independence Hall Association
- Indian Heart Association, non-profit dedicated to raising cardiovascular and stroke health awareness
- Indirect Hemagglutination Test, A form of agglutination test that involves red blood cells
- Ingeniørhøjskolen i Aarhus, the Engineering College of Aarhus, Denmark
- Institute for Healthcare Advancement, a not-for-profit, private operating foundation providing health care and improving health literacy
- Intel Hub Architecture, chipset and bus architecture for Intel Pentium 4, Intel, Pentium III-based systems
- International Housewares Association, trade organization promoting sales and marketing of housewares, est. 1938
- International Hydropower Association, a not-for-profit, international organization representing the hydropower sector, with a Central Office located in London, UK
- Israel Handball Association, governing body of team handball in Israel

== See also ==
- Iha (disambiguation)
