= Bintuni =

- District
- Location in West Papua Location in Indonesia
- Coordinates: 2°7′S 133°32′E
- Country: Indonesia
- Province: West Papua
- Regency: Teluk Bintuni Regency

Area
  - Total: 421.75 km^{2} (162.84 sq mi)

Population (mid 2023 estimate)
  - Total: 34,192
- Time zone: UTC+7 (WIB)

Bintuni (Dutch: Steenkool) is a small town and administrative district in West Papua, Indonesia and seat of the Teluk Bintuni Regency. The town comprises two villages (West Bintuni and East Bintuni) with a combined population of 13,795 at the 2010 Census and 22,757 inhabitants as at mid 2022. The town is located near the southeast coast of the Bird's Head Peninsula on Bintuni Bay. It is served by Steenkool Airport. The district had 18,663 inhabitants in 2010, which increased to 34,192 by mid 2023.

== Climate ==
Bintuni has a tropical rainforest climate (Af) with heavy rainfall in all months except July and August.

Climate data for Bintuni
Month	Jan	Feb	Mar	Apr	May	Jun	Jul	Aug	Sep	Oct	Nov	Dec	Year
Mean daily maximum °C (°F)	31.0 (87.8)	30.8 (87.4)	30.8 (87.4)	30.7 (87.3)	30.4 (86.7)	29.8 (85.6)	29.1 (84.4)	29.2 (84.6)	29.8 (85.6)	30.6 (87.1)	31.1 (88.0)	31.2 (88.2)	30.4 (86.7)
Daily mean °C (°F)	27.1 (80.8)	27.0 (80.6)	27.2 (81.0)	27.1 (80.8)	26.9 (80.4)	26.5 (79.7)	26.0 (78.8)	26.0 (78.8)	26.4 (79.5)	26.9 (80.4)	27.3 (81.1)	27.3 (81.1)	26.8 (80.3)
Mean daily minimum °C (°F)	23.2 (73.8)	23.3 (73.9)	23.6 (74.5)	23.5 (74.3)	23.5 (74.3)	23.2 (73.8)	22.9 (73.2)	22.8 (73.0)	23.0 (73.4)	23.2 (73.8)	23.5 (74.3)	23.4 (74.1)	23.3 (73.9)
Average rainfall mm (inches)	260 (10.2)	242 (9.5)	250 (9.8)	254 (10.0)	212 (8.3)	163 (6.4)	121 (4.8)	108 (4.3)	133 (5.2)	151 (5.9)	170 (6.7)	210 (8.3)	2,274 (89.4)
Source: Climate-Data.org
