= Sekar language =

Language in Papua

Sekar
- Native to: Indonesia
- Region: Kokas District, Teluk Patipi District, Fakfak Regency, Bomberai Peninsula
- Native speakers: (450 cited 1977)
- Language family: Austronesian: Malayo-Polynesian (MP); Central–Eastern MP; Kei–Tanimbar; Yamdena–North Bomberai; North Bomberai; Sekar Onim; Sekar

Language codes
- ISO 639-3: skz
- Glottolog: seka1247

Sekar (Seka) is a dialect of Sekar Onim language, an Austronesian language of the Onin Peninsula in Bomberai, West Papua.
