= Arguni language =

Language in Indonesia

Arguni
- Argoeni
- Táfer
- Native to: Indonesia
- Region: Arguni Island, north coast Bomberai Peninsula
- Native speakers: (around 300 cited 2000)
- Language family: Austronesian: Malayo-Polynesian; Central–Eastern Malayo-Polynesian; Kei–Tanimbar; Bedoanas–Erokwanas; Arguni

Language codes
- ISO 639-3: agf
- Glottolog: argu1237
- ELP: Arguni

Arguni (Argoeni, Táfer) is a minor Austronesian language of the north coast of the Bomberai Peninsula in western New Guinea.
