= Bintuni Airport =

- IATA: NTI; ICAO: WAUB

Summary
- Airport type: Public
- Owner: Directorate General of Civil Aviation (Indonesia)
- Operator: Directorate General of Civil Aviation (Indonesia)
- Serves: Bintuni
- Location: West Bintuni, Bintuni, West Papua, Indonesia
- Coordinates: 2°06′09″S 133°30′58″E
- Interactive map of Bintuni Airport

Runways
Direction	Length		Surface
Direction	ft	m	Surface
13/31	27,231	830	Asphalt
- http://www.gcmap.com/airport/NTI

Bintuni Airport (also known as Stenkool Airport) is a class III domestic airport located in West Bintuni, Bintuni, West Papua, Indonesia.

== Airlines and destinations ==
Airlines	Destinations
Susi Air	Babo, Fak-fak, Manokwari, Merdei, Sorong
