= Tomage =

- District
- Interactive map of Tomage
- Coordinates: 2°51′37″S 133°2′53″E
- Country: Indonesia
- Province: West Papua
- Regency: Fakfak

Area
  - Total: 887.00 km^{2} (342.47 sq mi)

Population (2023)
  - Total: 2,020
  - Density: 2.28/km^{2} (5.90/sq mi)
- Time zone: UTC+9 (Eastern Indonesia Time)
- Postal Code: 98033

Tomage is an administrative district (distrik) in Fakfak Regency, West Papua, Indonesia.
