= Kayauni =

- District
- Interactive map of Kayauni
- Coordinates: 2°55′0.1″S 132°18′0.0″E
- Country: Indonesia
- Province: West Papua
- Regency: Fakfak

Area
  - Total: 938.00 km^{2} (362.16 sq mi)

Population (2020)
  - Total: 1,697
  - Density: 1.809/km^{2} (4.686/sq mi)
- Time zone: UTC+9 (WIT)
- Postal Code: 98015

Kayauni is an administrative district in Fakfak Regency, West Papua, Indonesia.
