= Pariwari =

- District
- Location within the Indonesian region of Western New Guinea
- Coordinates: 2.93168°S 132.291°E
- Country: Indonesia
- Province: West Papua
- Regency: Fakfak

Area
  - Total: 587 km^{2} (227 sq mi)

Population (2020)
  - Total: 23,670
  - Density: 40.3/km^{2} (104/sq mi)
- Time zone: UTC+9 (WIT)
- Postal Code: 98013

Pariwari is an administrative district in Fakfak Regency, West Papua, Indonesia.
