= Mbaham–Iha languages =

Papua languages

Mbaham–Iha
- Nuclear West Bomberai
- Geographic distribution: West New Guinea, Bomberai Peninsula
- Linguistic classification: Trans–New Guinea: Berau Gulf; West Bomberai; Mbaham–Iha
- Subdivisions: Mbaham; Iha

Language codes
- Glottolog: nucl1641

The Mbaham–Iha languages are a pair of Papuan languages spoken on the Bomberai Peninsula of western New Guinea. The two languages, Baham (Mbaham) and Iha, are closely related to each other.

== Proto-language ==
=== Phonemes ===
Usher (2020) reconstructs the consonant and vowel inventories as:

		Labial	Alveolar	Palatal	Velar	
		Labial	Alveolar	Palatal	plain	labialized
Nasal		*m	*n			
Stop	plain	*p	*t		*k	*kʷ
Stop	prenasalized	*mb	*nd		*ŋg	*ŋgʷ
Fricative			*s			
Liquid		*w	*r	*j		

Prenasalized plosives do not occur initially, having merged with the voiceless plosives.

The vowels are *i *u *ɛ *ɔ *a and the diphthongs *iɛ *ɛi.

=== Pronouns ===
Usher (2020) reconstructs the free pronouns as:

	sg	pl
1excl	*[a/ɔ]n	[*mbi]
1incl	*[a/ɔ]n	*in
2	*k[a/ɔ]	*ki
3	*m[a/ɔ]	*mi, *wat

=== Basic vocabulary ===
Some lexical reconstructions by Usher (2020) are:

gloss	Proto-Mbaham–Iha	Mbaham	Iha
head	*kaˈnda	kndaː	kanda
ear	*kʷⁱɛr	kpʷujɛr	pɛr
eye		k(i)jɛp	kɛndɛp
blood	*wⁱɛk	wijɛk	wɛk
bone	*ˈtɔkar	tɔ(ː)qar	tɔqar
skin	*pak	paːk	pak
breast	*sɔn	sɔːn	hɔn ~ sɔn
louse	*mɛⁱn	miːn	mɛin
dog	*jaˈmbar	jambaːr	mbiar
pig	*[ku]ˈndur	kunduːr	ndur
egg	*wun	uːn	wun
tree	*wiˈra	wurʲaː ~ wɛrʲaː	wɛrɛ ~ wrɛ
man/male	*nami-sar	nami-ha	nɛmɛ-har
woman/female	*t[ɔ/u]mb[ɔ/u]r	tumbu-	(tɔ-)tɔmbɔr
sun	*kaˈminV	kamiːni	kimina
moon	*kaˈpas	kabaːs	kabah
water	*kiˈra	krija	kara
stone	*war	waːr	war
name	*nⁱɛ	nʲiɛ	nɛ
eat	*nawa	nɔwa	nɔwa ~ nawa-
one	*ɔkʷɔ[nɔ]	ɔqɔnɔ	pɔ

Protoforms of the 20 most-stable items in the Swadesh list include the following.

gloss	Proto-Mbaham–Iha
*mɛin	louse
?	two
*kiˈra	water
*kʷiɛr	ear
*kimi	die
*[a/ɔ]n	I
?	liver
? (k(i)jɛp / kɛndɛp)	eye
*tan	hand
*kɔmɛn	hear
*wiˈra, aˈtɔkʷ	tree, tree/wood
*ˈsɛjir	fish
*niɛ	name
*war	stone
?	tooth
*sɔn	breast
*k[a/ɔ]	you
?	path
*ˈtɔkar	bone
?	tongue (*mak voice/language)
