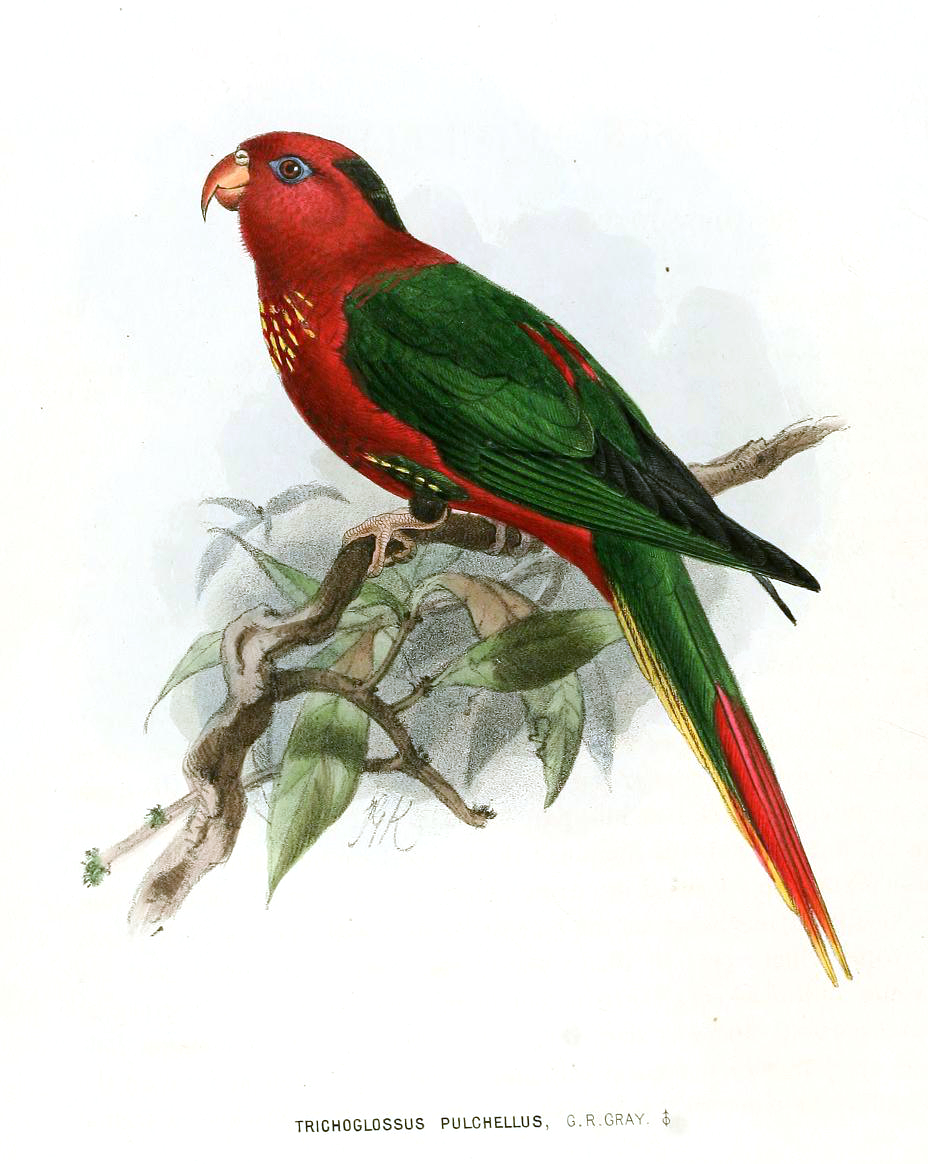
- Fairy lorikeet (Charmosynopsis pulchella)

Scientific classification
- Kingdom: Animalia
- Phylum: Chordata
- Class: Aves
- Order: Psittaciformes
- Family: Psittaculidae
- Tribe: Loriini
- Genus: Charmosynopsis; Salvadori, 1877

Type species
- Charmosyna pulchella Fairy lorikeet Gray, GR, 1859

= Charmosynopsis =

Genus of birds

Charmosynopsis is a genus of parrots in the family Psittaculidae that are endemic to New Guinea, the southern Maluku Islands.

== Taxonomy ==
The genus Charmosynopsis was introduced in 1877 by the Italian zoologist Tommaso Salvadori with the fairy lorikeet as the type species. The genus was formerly considered as a junior synonym of the genus Charmosyna but following the publication of a molecular phylogenetic study in 2020, Charmosynopsis was resurrected for two species in a discrete clade that was a basal to the other members of Charmosyna.

The genus contains two species:

- Blue-fronted lorikeet (Charmosynopsis toxopei)
- Fairy lorikeet (Charmosynopsis pulchella)
