= Kei–Tanimbar languages =

Subgroup of the Austronesian language family

Kei–Tanimbar
- Southeast Maluku; Tanimbar–Bomberai
- Geographic distribution: Indonesia (Maluku Islands)
- Linguistic classification: Austronesian: Malayo-Polynesian (MP); Central–Eastern MP; Kei–Tanimbar
- Proto-language: Proto-Kei–Tanimbar

Language codes
- Glottolog: keit1238

The Kei–Tanimbar languages are a small group of Austronesian languages spoken on the Kei and Tanimbar islands in the southern Maluku Islands, and on the north side of the Bomberai Peninsula. The languages include:

- Kei–Tanimbar
  - Kei–Fordata
    - Kei
    - Fordata
  - Yamdena–North Bomberai
    - Yamdena
    - North Bomberai
      - Onin
      - Sekar
      - Uruangnirin

Grimes & Edwards add the following languages, previously incertae sedis, and rename the family Tanimbar–Bomberai:

- Teor-Kur
- Irarutu–Nabi: Irarutu, Kuri (Nabi)
- Bedoanas–Erokwanas: Arguni, Bedoanas, Erokwanas
