= Arguni (district) =

- District
- Country: Indonesia
- Province: West Papua
- Regency: Fakfak

Arguni is a district (distrik) in Fakfak Regency, West Papua, Indonesia. The district covers part of Arguni Island. The district government center is located in Fior Village. This district is a division of Kokas District based on West Papua Regional Regulation No. 4/2012.

In Andamata, Fior, and Furir Villages, Tapurarang sites were found in the form of various reddish ochre handprints attached to rock walls on the coast.

== Government ==
=== Administrative division ===
This district consists of 5 Kampung (Village), including:

1. Andamata
2. Arguni
3. Fior
4. Furir
5. Taver
