= Kalamang language =

Berau Gulf language spoken in Indonesia

Kalamang
- Karas
- Region: West Papua
- Native speakers: (100 cited 2000)
- Language family: Trans–New Guinea: Berau Gulf; West Bomberai; Kalamang

Language codes
- ISO 639-3: kgv
- Glottolog: kara1499
- ELP: Karas
- Karas is classified as Severely Endangered by the UNESCO Atlas of the World's Languages in Danger.

- Location within Western New Guinea Location within Indonesia Location within Southeast Asia
- Coordinates: 3.47°S 132.68°E

Kalamang, sometimes also called Karas, is a divergent Trans–New Guinea language spoken on the biggest of the Karas Islands off the Bomberai Peninsula, that is part of the West Bomberai family. It is spoken in Antalisa and Mas villages on Karas Island.

== Phonology ==
Consonants
	Labial	Alveolar	Palatal	Dorsal
Plosive	p b	t d	c ɟ	k g
Fricative	f	s		h
Nasal	m	n		ŋ
Approximant	w	l	j	
Trill		r		

- The consonants /f/ and /h/ are uncommon, with f mostly appearing in loanwords. The palatal plosives, /c/ and /ɟ/, also appear mostly in loans, though some come from a historically palatalised /t/ or /d/.

Vowels
	Front	Central	Back
High	i		u
Mid	e		o
Low		a	

- The vowels /a e i/ are reduced to [ə] in unstressed syllables in fast or casual speech.

Additionally, the following diphthongs are present: /ei/, /oi/, /ou/, /ui/.

== Pronouns ==
Cowan (1953) records the following pronouns for Karas.

		singular	dual	plural
1st person	exclusive	aan	inir	piridok
1st person	inclusive	aan	inir	aantemu (?)
2nd person		kame	?	kijumene
3rd person		mame	mjeir	mubameir

Visser (2020) records the following pronouns for Karas of Maas village:

Free nominative
		singular	dual	plural
1st person	exclusive	an	in-ier	in
1st person	inclusive	an	pi-er	pi
2nd person		ka	ki-er	ki
3rd person		ma	m-ier	mu

Free possessive
		singular	plural
1st person	exclusive	aŋ-gon	pi-n
1st person	inclusive	aŋ-gon	iŋ-gon
2nd person		ka-in	ki-n
3rd person		ma-in	mu-in

Possessive suffix
		singular	plural
1st person	exclusive	-an	-pe, -p-in
1st person	inclusive	-an	-un
2nd person		-tʃa	-tʃe
3rd person		-un	-un

The free possessives and possessive suffixes can occur together.

== Grammar ==
=== Nouns and the noun phrase ===
==== Nouns ====
Nouns take suffixes marking their possessors. Nouns can be reduplicated, either fully or partially, often resulting in a plural interpretation, though this may alter the meaning of the noun in some other way, such as intensifying, or it may derive a verb, as in mun "flea", munmun "search for fleas." A subset of kinship terms can mark plurality with a suffix of the form -mur/-mumur, but this is not found on other nouns. Some noun roots cannot appear alone, and must take a possessive suffix or some other marker, one group of these being some kinship terms which are required to have possessive suffixes, such as nam- "husband", or tara- "grandparent, grandchild". Nouns can be compounds, either the first or second component may be the head, with the other being the modifier. In compounds where the second element is the head, it may be optionally possessive marked, but this is lexicalised, as the form of the possessive marker is fixed (e.g. kokok nar(-un) chicken egg-(possessive suffix)".

==== Pronouns ====
Pronouns have distinct roots for each person in the singular and plural, along with making a clusivity distinction in the first person plural, and from the plural stems, a dual pronoun can be formed by suffixing -ier. The first-person plural inclusive pronoun pi, may be used as a generic or impersonal reference. The third person singular pronoun ma refers to inanimate referents of any number, the other third person forms are not used for inanimates. Suffixes -(ah)utak and tain attach to the pronoun roots, both meaning "only", though -tain serves more to emphasise or single out a referent from a larger group, while -(ah)utak primarily quantifies. -gan, -(nV)ninggan, on duals or plural pronouns respectively, expresses "both, all". Possessive pronouns are formed by a suffix -gon on the first-person singular and plural-exclusive, and -in on other roots, and may either modify a head noun, or stand alone (e.g. anggon may mean either "my" or "mine, my (one)".

==== Noun phrase structure ====
The order of elements in the noun phrase is thus: A possessor noun phrase or pronoun may precede the head noun, and these are the only elements that may do so. After the head noun are in order, quantifiers, possessive pronouns, attributive modifiers, and demonstratives.

==== Possession ====
Possession is usually marked by a possessive suffix on the possessed noun, optionally accompanied by a noun phrase referring to the possessor preceding the head, or less commonly, a pronoun. A possessive pronoun may follow the head noun, which may be either marked or unmarked with a possessive suffix, though possessive pronouns much more commonly occur alone, rather than modifying a head noun. The nouns esa, ema "mother, father" often use this construction, as they may only take a possessive suffix to form a teknonym, a very common way of addressing someone, where they are referred to as the parent of their eldest child. It is also found with compound nouns that obligatorily take a fossilised possessive suffix, since the suffix slot cannot be used to indicate possession on these compounds.

==== Quantifiers ====
Quantifiers include both numeral, and non-numeral quantifiers. Reduplication on numerals is distributive, though Kon "one", when reduplicated, can mean "a few", or "not any/nothing" in a negated clause. Reduplication on the non-numeral quantifier bolon "little", intensifies the meaning.

There are numeral classifiers, which are prefixes that attach to a numeral, or the content interrogative puraman "how many", expressing some feature of the noun being quantified, such as kis- for long, thin objects, or nar- for small, round ones. Not all nouns have a classifier assigned to them, for example, human nouns do not, but for those which do, the use of a classifier with a numeral is obligatory. Many classifiers also function as nouns referring to parts of wholes, like tak- "leaf, page, flat object", or ar- "stem", and are possessed in this context. When functioning as classifiers, a single noun referring to a kind of plant may occur with different classifiers, depending on which part of it is being discussed, like the plant as a whole, its fruits, its seeds, etc. When a quantifier is the only post-head modifier object noun, in addition to the noun taking the object marker =at, the quantifier receives the object quantifier suffix -i. If there is another post-noun modifier however, object status is marked only by the object marker attaching to the final element of the noun phrase.

==== Modifiers of other word classes ====
The marker =ten attaches to predicates placed after the noun within the noun phrase, turning them into modifiers. Its use is not required on stative verbs, which fill the role of adjectives, in this function. Constructions using =ten can be considered relative clauses. The associative marker =kin appears on a modifying noun, to mark meanings including possession, purpose or location, like nika war=kin line fish-kin "fishing line."

==== Demonstratives ====
Kalamang has a number of different demonstrative roots, with different syntactic behaviour. Wa, me "this, that" exhibit the full range of possibilities, they can follow a noun in a noun phrase, be an argument or predicate of a non-verbal clause (identificational function), and they are also the only ones that can be used as pronouns. These forms can also take suffix -ndi, meaning "like (this/that", or suffixes -bes, -rip, -sen "(this/that) many, big, far". Me is also often used in forms expressing a change of setting or time in a narrative. Other forms include the far distal owa, which is often used for nonvisible referents, and yawe and osa, which mark elevation rather than distance, "up" and "down" respectively. These demonstratives can be used as modifiers to a head noun, and identificationally, but cannot be used as pronouns, and are often used adverbially as well when marked for the locative or lative. The anaphoric demonstrative, opa is only used as a modifier, referring to already mentioned or accessible referents. When demonstratives have the object marker attached, it takes a reduced form with them -t, while the locative =ko and lative =ka are augmented to -t=ko and -n=ka.

==== Postpositions ====
Postpositions are clitics, because they are not bound to the head of the noun phrase, but always attach to the last element, like English 's The postposition =at marks objects, both direct and some indirect objects, depending on the verb, whether animate or inanimate. The only situation where it doesn't surface is if the object is marked as topic with me. The object marker co-occurs with the object quantifier suffix if there is no other following modifier.

The marker =ki has two functions, as an instrumental marker, and as a benefactive marker in the "give" construction. The similative is marked by =kap. Comitative =bon marks either animate or inanimate accompaniment. Unlike other postpositions, it may co-occur with =at, since it also functions as a coordinator, and it may stand alone with an omitted head if the accompanying referent is obvious from context.

The locative =ko, konggo, which marks location (though sometimes goal, when placed after some verbs of motion), and the lative =ka, =kongga, which marks the source or goal of a movement, each have two forms depending on whether the referent they mark is inanimate or animate, respectively. The animate lative and locative may also mark the indirect objects of some verbs. To show more specific locational meanings, there are locational nouns, such as keit- "top(side)" or kol- "outside". They cannot appear alone, and must be either used in locative or lative marked noun phrases, be either marked as possessed, or take a suffix of the form -pis, -kadok "-side".

==== Coordination ====
Noun phrases can be coordinated via juxtaposition, or through the use of the comitative postposition =bon, which follows each coordinated referent. Ye "or" following the coordinands is used for disjunctive coordination.

=== Verbs and complex predicates ===
==== Verbs ====
Verbs most often function as the predicate of a clause. Often, multiple verbs will do so in a complex predicate. Verbs can be either active or stative; stative verbs covering meanings that English generally uses adjectives for, as adjectives are not a distinct word class from verbs in Kalamang. Verbs take the attributive marker =ten to modify a noun within a noun phrase; this marker is used much less often with stative verbs. Verbs can be nominalised with -un, resulting in an abstract noun, such as deriving ririn-un "length" from ririn "long", or konenen-un "memory" from konenen "remember". Reduplication on active verbs has a range of possible meanings, including durative, distributive, and habitual, with a diminutive reading also possible for some verbs. Reduplication of stative verbs intensifies the meaning, which is done alongside attaching the intensification clitic =tun for most.

Most verbs are regular, but there are some irregular verbs which display variation between ending with a vowel, or attaching a final n or t before some inflectional clitics. Most follow the same pattern of which clitic triggers each ending, but some do not. When not followed by a clitic, irregular verbs may end either in a vowel, or in n, though bo "go" surfaces as bot when it is the only verb in a predicate, or when following a locative or lative marked noun phrase in a complex predicate, but bo when occurring with other verbs in a complex predicate. Directional verbs are a set of irregular verbs with unique behavior, they precede locative marked noun phrases rather than following them as other verbs do, take a unique imperative ending -ei, and can be causativised by the marker di=. There are also many irregular verbs to do with cutting or breaking that all end in ma, and many of these have intransitive counterparts where the ma is replaced with cie, and/or a related noun (e.g. sanggoup "branch", sanggotma "break off (a branch)", sanggoyie "(a branch) be broken".

==== Verb Derivation ====
There is both valency reducing, and increasing morphology. In terms of valency reducing, there is a reflexive prefix un- is used, though it is not frequent. Reciprocal proclitic nau= forms reciprocals, but may have more specific meanings, as in saur "shoot", nau=sair "be at war". For valency increasing, there is the applicative clitic ko=, which causes a referent to become the object of the verb, when it would have been more peripheral in the underived form. For example gareor "pour", takes the thing poured as its object, while ko=gareor takes the location of the pouring as the object. There are two causative clitics, di= and ma=. di= may only attach to directional verbs as in sara "ascend" di=sara "raise/put up", though it also attaches to some non-verbal predicates; some other verbs may form a causative with ma= instead.

Verbs may incorporate an object noun, which will directly precede the verb and not be marked as an object, (e.g. Non-incorporated ter=at na vs incorporated ter-na, drink (the/some) tea vs tea-drink) The noun don "thing", is only attested incorporated, never as an object in its own noun phrase.

==== Complex Predicates ====
Multiple predicational elements, including both verbs, and locative or lative marked noun phrases, can be combined to form a complex predicate within a single clause, in which predicate-level markers appear only once, attached to the final element. Locative and lative marked nouns may appear alongside other verbs, to add explicit sources or goals to a complex predicate of motion; in this context, the locative only indicates goal, the lative may indicate either source or goal. Manner verbs precede them, verbs of motion may precede or follow them, while any verb may be the final verb in the construction, indicating an action done in the location, once arriving.

The predicate linker =i is often used to form complex predicates, attaching to the first element. These include those involving verbs of motion (e.g. ecien=i sara return-LINK ascend "go back up", talep-pis=i bot outside-side=LINK go "walk outside"), or an action and its result (e.g. pue=i parair hit=LINK break "break (by hitting)/hit and break). A verb may be doubled, both copies taking =i, to indicate an action done repeatedly or until some other action takes place. Using the verb koyet after an elements marked with =i forms the completive aspect, meaning "After VERBing", which is then followed by a different clause.

Some verbs appearing in complex predicates cannot appear on their own, such as kuru and bon, both meaning "bring", they are followed by a motion, or a locative or lative marked noun phrase indicating the goal. toni appears after a verb of speech or thought, introducing a complement expressing what is said or thought, while it can appear before another verb, to indicate desire instead. A verb nominalised with -un may precede eranun "cannot" to indicate lack of ability.

Serial verb constructions, in which no element links the verbs, and all verbs used may appear independently, are also present. These may express actions performed in sequence, often with the second as the goal of the first, and often include a motion verb, but this is not required. Bo "go", which surfaces as bot when used alone, may appear as the first verb in a serialisation with the meaning "become", followed by a stative verb indicating the result state. Bo, as well as ra "move", can also appear as the first verb, indicating the second verb is the goal of motion. Verbs of posture can appear in a serialisation showing the posture one is in while doing another action. paruo "do/make" can appear as the first verb to causativise the second verb, though it is not productive, mostly appearing with stative intransitive verbs.

=== Clauses ===
==== Basic constituent order ====
The typical word order of a Kalamang clause is subject, object, predicate. Subjects are unmarked, while objects are marked with =at. Subject and object do not need to be mentioned overtly, if the context makes it clear that it is being referred to.

==== Information structure marking ====
Topicalisation can be done through fronting a referent to the beginning of the sentence, marking it with the topic marker me, or both. Me is placed after a noun phrase, following a postposition if there is one, though if the noun phrase would be object marked with =at, the object marker does not surface. Me also has uses for topicalising clauses. Subjects can also be topicalised by apposing them to a personal pronoun. Focus is marked by the clitics =a, =ba following the focused element, coming after a postposition, just as the topic marker does.

==== Trivalent clauses ====
Structure of trivalent clauses varies; For verbs of showing and sending, both objects are marked with =at, and may occur in either order. With most other trivalent verbs, the theme is marked with =at, and is followed by a recipient marked with the animate locative or lative, =konggo or =kongga. In both of these structures, the direct object (theme) is rarely mentioned overtly. The meaning "give" is expressed with a zero morpheme, where the argments are in order: The agent; the theme, which takes the object marker =at; and the recipient, which takes the benefactive marker =ki if it is a noun, but not if it is a pronoun, and is optionally preceded by the causative di=, with seemingly no change in meaning. As with other ditransitive clauses, the theme is often not overt. Linguist Eline Visser, who wrote A Grammar of Kalamang, says that "a clause consisting of a noun followed by a pronoun [...] or of two pronouns [...] is always interpreted as a give-construction by Kalamang speakers". Predicate final grammatical markers, which usually attach to the verb, attach to the recipient. A give-construction can appear after an =i marked verb in a complex predicate, and may consist of just the recipient (e.g. rep=i ka "get and give to you")

==== Reflexive clauses ====
Reflexive clauses can be formed through the use of the reflexive prefix un- on a verb, and the subject pronoun often takes the quantifying -tain suffix. This suffix is also encountered in sentences with reflexive meaning without the use of un-, though such examples are ambiguous. More often, diri, a reflexive pronoun loaned from malay, is used as the object, with a Kalamang possessive suffix.

==== Comparative clauses ====
The verbs lebe, or more rarely nemies, can be used to form comparative clauses, with the referent the subject is compared against as their object. The property being compared is not mentioned overtly. Instead of a dedicated comparative construction, two clauses describing opposite properties may be juxtaposed.

==== Existential clauses ====
The verb mambon is used to form clauses of existence and possession, with the subject being the referent whose existence or possession is predicated (e.g. "I have a pen" is expressed with a similar structure to "There is my pen.")

==== Nonverbal clauses ====
Many elements can function as a predicate without the use of a verb, including unmarked nouns or pronouns (both personal and possessive) to express equation, inclusion, or possession, demonstratives, quantifiers, and locative or (rarely) lative marked referents to express location or goal. A similative =kap marked referent, a referent preceded by nain "like", or one marked by both, expresses similarity, while the use of both makers may also express equality of some property like height. These often have the topic marker me following the subject. In identificational clauses, which have a demonstrative as one of the elements, it will appear after a focus marked noun, but before a topic marked noun.

==== Aspect, mood, and modality marking ====
Aspect, mood, and modality are marked in Kalamang at various spaces across the clause, with both post-subject particles, and post-predicate clitics being common, but there are other possibilities as well. Temporal adverbials come before the subject. A small class of manner adverbs precede the predicate, while intensifying clitics follow it, as well as weinun "too, as well".

The irrealis clitic =et attaches to the predicate, marking future or hypothetical situations, such as possibilities or explanations of how something is done, and it appears in conditional clauses. In clauses with irrealis =et, the clitic =re may attach to an argument, usually the subject, producing a clause warning of danger, something bad that may happen. Volitional =kin marks an event that is desired, or imminent. Imperative clauses are formed with a final clitic =te, though motion verbs, or transitive verbs ending in ma take a suffix -ei instead. If the subject of the imperative clause is plural a clitic =tar is used, with irregular or motion verbs taking =r instead. Prohibitives attach a suffix -mun to a subject pronoun, if present, and a clitic =in to the predicate. Unlike the imperative, it can have a non second-person subject, and will then indicate that something should or must not happen.

Other markers of modality are free forms. Borrowings from Malay, bisa "can", and harus "must", appear after the subject usually, but before the subject in the apodosis of a condition. Gen and reon both mean "maybe", and just differ in position; gen follows the subject, reon, the predicate. There are also modality related forms with more complex behaviour, such as suka- "(not) like", which takes a possessive suffix and is negated, and eranun, which appears as part of a complex predicate.

After the subject, aspectual markers can be found. The iamitive particle se, he (the he allomorph can appear after a vowel) indicates something already done, or is a perfect, completed state with present relevance, while the nondum tok means "still", or "first". Under negation, se means "not anymore", while tok has the meaning "not yet". Aspectual markers can also attach to the predicate, =teba marks the progressive, and can co-occur with other predicate clitics, preceding the irrealis or imperative, but following the volitional or negative.

==== Negation ====
Verbal clauses are negated with the clitic =nin attaching to the predicate. Some other predicate enclitics cannot combine with it, though it may be followed by the irrealis =et, which results in a negated conditional clause. Imperatives are negated with distinct prohibitive markers. =nin negates non-verbal clauses with a preposition-marked noun phrase as predicate, and may also negate unmarked nouns in predicate position, though final ge may also be used for this. Ge is required to negate predicate demonstratives and possessive pronouns. As well as these grammatical forms, there are also dedicated negative verbs. Negation of existential clauses, which may also express possessive semantics, uses the negative existential verb saerak instead of mambon, without a negative clitic. Negation of desire is expressed using suka (a borrowing from Indonesian suka "like") which takes a possessive suffix that may either co-refer to the subject, or be fixed in the third-person singular form, and is followed by either ge, or a verb negated by =nin to express an undesired action. Negation of ability uses the verb eranun "cannot", following the lexical verb, which takes the nominalising suffix -un.

==== Questions ====
Interrogative words occur in-situ. The root tama means "which" on its own, but can be marked locative or lative to question location, or goal/source, respectively. Other interrogatives are the pronouns naman, neba "who, what", puraman "how many", and tamandi "how/why". Polar interrogatives can be marked by just a final rising-falling intonation, but often end with the tag ye ge? "or not?", though tags ge, e, and to are also possible.

=== Clause combining ===
==== Coordination ====
Clauses can be coordinated through juxtaposition, though conjunctions are also often used. Many come in pairs, where a native Kalamang conjunction, a loaned conjunction, or both may be used, without a change in meaning. Eba/ba and terus "then", are a native and loaned pair, and come between the clauses they connect. Similar pairs include ye and atau "or", ye follows each conjunct, atau only the first; and ba and tapi "but". =tauna and =tenden "so", both attach to a clause expressing a reason, with the result following. The marker mena "or else/lest", elsewhere used to mean "later", can function to link two clauses together, in which the second expresses a negative outcome or possibility, with the first often stating something done to prevent it

==== Non-final markers ====
Clause markers =te, =ta mark a non-final clause, often with a sequential or causal meaning, and these are often also followed by the topic marker me. Eba may follow a clause with the non-final marker =ta, resulting in a consequential, "so that" meaning.

==== Relative clauses ====
Relative clauses can be formed with the attributive marker =ten attaching to a predicate placed after a head noun. The role of the head noun in the relative clause is only ever subject. More often, sentences with meanings corresponding to relative clauses in other languages will be expressed by two distinct clauses in sequence (e.g. instead of "I caught the dog that bit me", one would say something analogous to "The dog bit me, then I caught it".)

==== Complement clauses ====
Complement clauses follow the main clause, and are used for embedding speech or thought. The verb toni "say", can be used when followed by a complement clause of speech, or appear in a complex predicate following another verb of speech or thought like gonggin "know", or gerket "ask", though these may also be used alone. Speech need not be introduced with an overt speech verb however, depending on context, wandi "like this" may introduce it, as well as the iamtive particle se, or the interjection "eh", all of which are also common alongside speech verbs.

==== Conditional Clauses ====
Conditional clauses can be formed with =ero/=o attaching to the predicate, often the Austronesian loan kalau appears at the start of the clause. Concessive conditionals are formed with taero, which may be derived from =taet "more, again", followed by =ero/=o; often the malay loan biar is used at the start of the clause. Irrealis =et can also be used to form conditionals, referring to the scene or situation where the apodosis applies, and it is often followed by the topic marker me in this function. When =et follows the negator =nin, this forms a negative conditional clause.

==== Discourse linking ====
Tail-head linkage is commonly used in discourse in Kalamang, in which a clause, or just its predicate, is repeated at start of a following clause chain. This structure often uses the completive aspect =i koyet, a complex predicate. Ma he me "That's it" (lit. It is that), is often used to end a particular stretch of discourse.

== Machine Translation from One Book ==
In 2023, Kalamang was used by machine learning researchers for a benchmark called "Machine Translation from One Book". It was chosen because of its negligible presence in the Internet and because field research materials were collected by Eline Visser, who published "A grammar of Kalamang" as her PhD thesis. Although Kalamang is primarily oral language, it can be written in the Indonesian alphabet. Researchers used all existing materials (grammar book, short dictionary, and small set of Kalamang-English sentences) to test how large language models (LLM) can learn a language from a single source, and tested the quality of translations. In 2024, researchers from Google showed that their latest LLM, Gemini 1.5, can translate English to Kalamang with similar quality to a human who learned from the same resources.

== Sources ==
- Cowan, H. K. J. (1953). Voorlopige Resultaten van een Ambtelijk Taalonderzoek in Nieuw-Guinea (in Dutch). 's-Gravenhage: Martinus Nijhoff.
- Visser, Eline (19 January 2022). A grammar of Kalamang. Language Science Press. ISBN 978-3-96110-343-0.
- Visser, Eline. 2021. "Kalamang dictionary". ids.clld.org.. In: Key, Mary Ritchie & Comrie, Bernard (eds.) The Intercontinental Dictionary Series. Leipzig: Max Planck Institute for Evolutionary Anthropology. (CLDF dataset)
