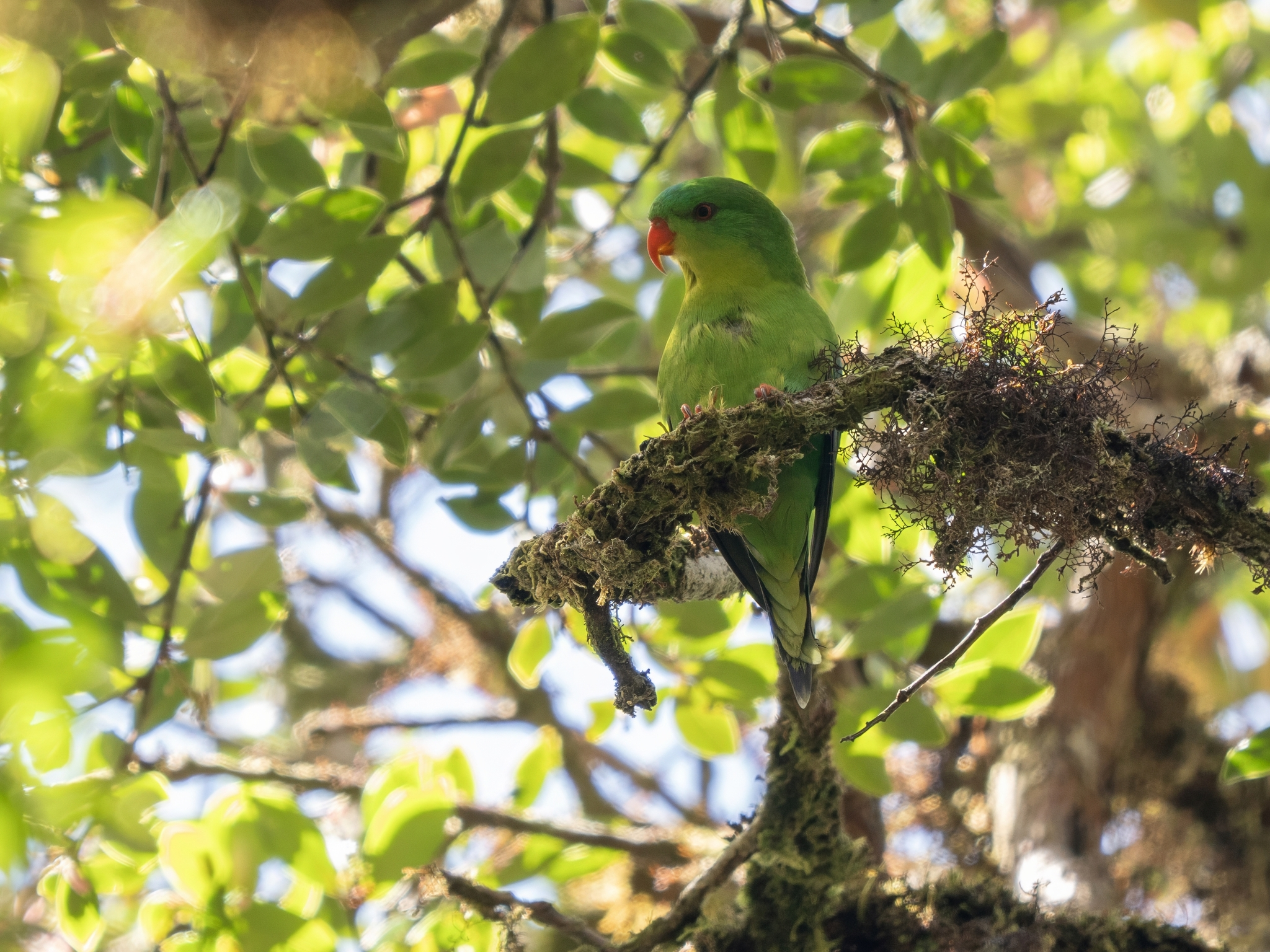

Conservation status
- Data Deficient (IUCN 3.1)

Scientific classification
- Kingdom: Animalia
- Phylum: Chordata
- Class: Aves
- Order: Psittaciformes
- Family: Psittaculidae
- Genus: Charmosynopsis
- Species: C. toxopei

Binomial name
- Charmosynopsis toxopei (Siebers, 1930)

Synonyms
- Charmosyna toxopei

= Blue-fronted lorikeet =

Species of bird

The blue-fronted lorikeet (Charmosynopsis toxopei) also known as the Buru lorikeet, is a parrot endemic to the Indonesian island of Buru.

== Taxonomy ==
This species was formerly placed in the genus Charmosyna. It was moved to the resurrected genus Charmosynopsis based on a molecular phylogenetic study published in 2020.

== History ==
The first foreign scientist who described the blue-fronted lorikeet and the only one who managed to capture it (seven individuals in the 1920s, using lime) was the Java-born Dutch lepidopterist Lambertus Johannes Toxopeus, which is reflected in the Latin name of the bird. His observations were summarized by the Dutch ornithologist Hendrik Cornelis Siebers (1890–1949) in 1930.

== Distribution and habitat ==
Toxopeus noted that the bird's habitat on Buru is likely restricted to the western part of the Rana plateau in the center of the island (settlements of Wa Temun, Wa Fehat and Nal Besi), as the local name of the bird, utu papua, was not known anywhere else on the island. Two indigenous hunters caught blue-fronted lorikeets for food north-west from the Rana lake, but the bird was not found in the mangroves of the Kayeli Bay at the eastern part of Buru. The locals living at the Rana plateau reported that the bird feeds on nectar and pollen of the flowering trees. Toxopeus found the bird at elevations of 840–1,000 m (2,760–3,280 ft). Four blue-fronted lorikeets were observed in the 1980s, in very different areas at the north-western (Bara settlement) and southern coasts of Buru, at a coconut plantation and in a disturbed lowland forest between the coastal farming fields and the base of the nearby hills. Flocks of several birds were found in another area at elevation of 600 meters (2,000 ft). In November 2014, it was rediscovered and the first photographs were published by birders from BirdQuest in the internet. The analysis of all observations suggested that the blue-fronted lorikeet preferably inhabits forests at the altitude of several hundred meters.

== Behaviour ==
The blue-fronted lorikeets usually live in pairs, but may form groups up to 10 individuals. They grow to about 16 cm (6.3 in). The voice was described by Toxopeus as a ti–ti–ti–ti–tititi shrill, but might be related not to the blue-fronted lorikeet, but to the red-flanked lorikeet (Charmosyna placentis) which was later observed in the same area. In nature the blue-fronted lorikeets feed on flowering trees of the family Myrtaceae, and in captivity they consumed bananas and milk.

== Status ==
The anecdotal character of their observation and very limited habitat, which is gradually shrinking due to logging, urged the International Union for Conservation of Nature to gradually elevate its status from threatened in 1988 to vulnerable in 1994 and critically endangered since 2000. The establishment of two protected areas on Buru, Gunung Kapalat Mada (1,380 km^{2} (530 sq mi)) and Waeapo (50 km^{2} (19 sq mi)), partly aim at preserving the habitat of the blue-fronted lorikeet.

== Elusivity and Sightings ==
The lorikeet was seen and photographed for the first time since 2014 in April 2026. The sighting was recently announced by the Search for Lost Birds and the American Bird Conservancy on June 3, 2026.
