= Berau Gulf =

- MacCleur Gulf
- Teluk Berau (Indonesian)
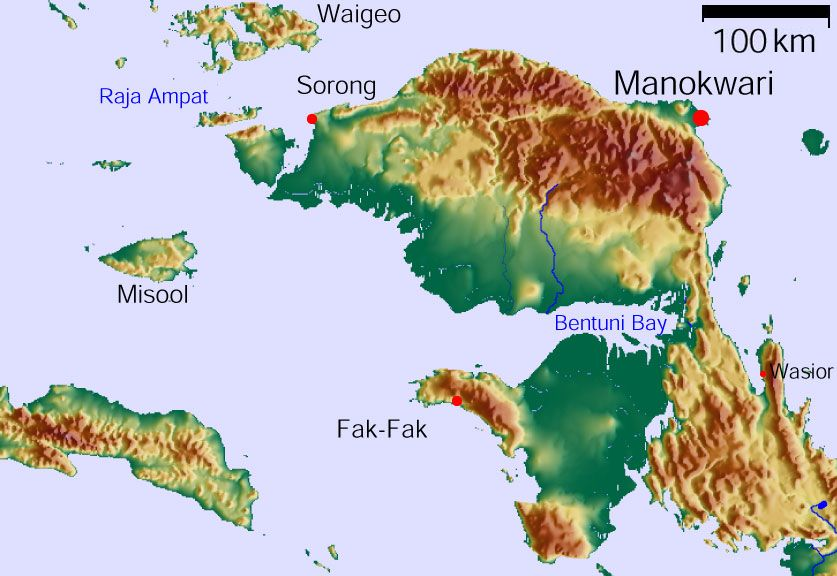

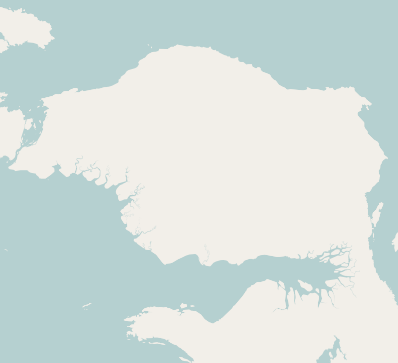
- Location within Bird's Head Peninsula
- Coordinates: 2.462661°S 132.518469°E
- Primary inflows: Bintuni Bay
- Primary outflows: Ceram Sea

The Berau Gulf (Indonesian: Teluk Berau), formerly the MacCleur Gulf, separates the Vogelkop (Doberai) and Bomberai Peninsulas of Western New Guinea. It opens on the Ceram Sea to the west and ends in Bintuni Bay to the east.

== Geography ==
Berau Bay is formed by the broadening of Bintuni Bay to the east and separates the Vogelkop Peninsula to the north from the Bomberai Peninsula (with its western extremity, the Fakfak Peninsula) to the south. To the west is the open Seram Sea. The islands of Ogar and Arguni are located off the Fakfak peninsula.

The area is part of the Indonesian province of Papua Barat. The administrative district of Fakfak lies on the southern coast, while the northern coast (the southern coast of the Vogelkop) belongs to the administrative districts of Teluk Bintuni and Sorong Selatan (South Sorong).

== See also ==
- Berau Gulf languages
