= Institute for Healthcare Advancement =

The Institute for Healthcare Advancement (IHA) is a not-for-profit, private operating foundation providing health care and improving health literacy at the national level. It is located in Anaheim, California.

== Local services ==
The La Habra Family Resource Center is 501 S Idaho St in La Habra CA. It is a complete, family-centered support system, working with community resources that can address the health, emotional, social, and academic needs of children and their families.

== Health literacy publications ==
It published easy-to-read 'What to Do For Health' books, used by the states of California and South Dakota, health plans, Head Starts, health departments, and more; these books help reduce emergency room visits and costs.

Health Education Literacy Program (H.E.L.P.) Curriculum is an ESL (English as a Second Language) curriculum. As learners begin to master reading, writing, and speaking in English, they are also learning healthcare skills to become effective child caregivers. This project was funded through an English literacy and civics education grant from the Louisiana State Department of Education.

It has developed easy to use bilingual versions of advance health care directives in English, Spanish, Chinese, and Vietnamese; a Khmer version is being developed. It has been approved for use in California and may be downloaded for free.

== Health Literacy Conference ==
It sponsors an annual national Health Literacy Conference for healthcare professionals and educators to teach them about health literacy, the latest research, and how to improve their patient education. It presents three awards for outstanding achievements in health literacy in the categories of Research, Innovative Programs, and Published Materials.

=== Annual themes ===
- 2002 Health Literacy - State of the Art
- 2003 Organizational Solutions
- 2004 Clinical and Educational Solutions
- 2005 Culture, Language and Clinical Issues
- 2006 Beyond the Written Word: Alternative Solutions
- 2007 Chronic Illness Management
- 2008 Primary Care - Best Practices and Skill Building
- 2009 Health Literacy - Bridging Research and Practice
