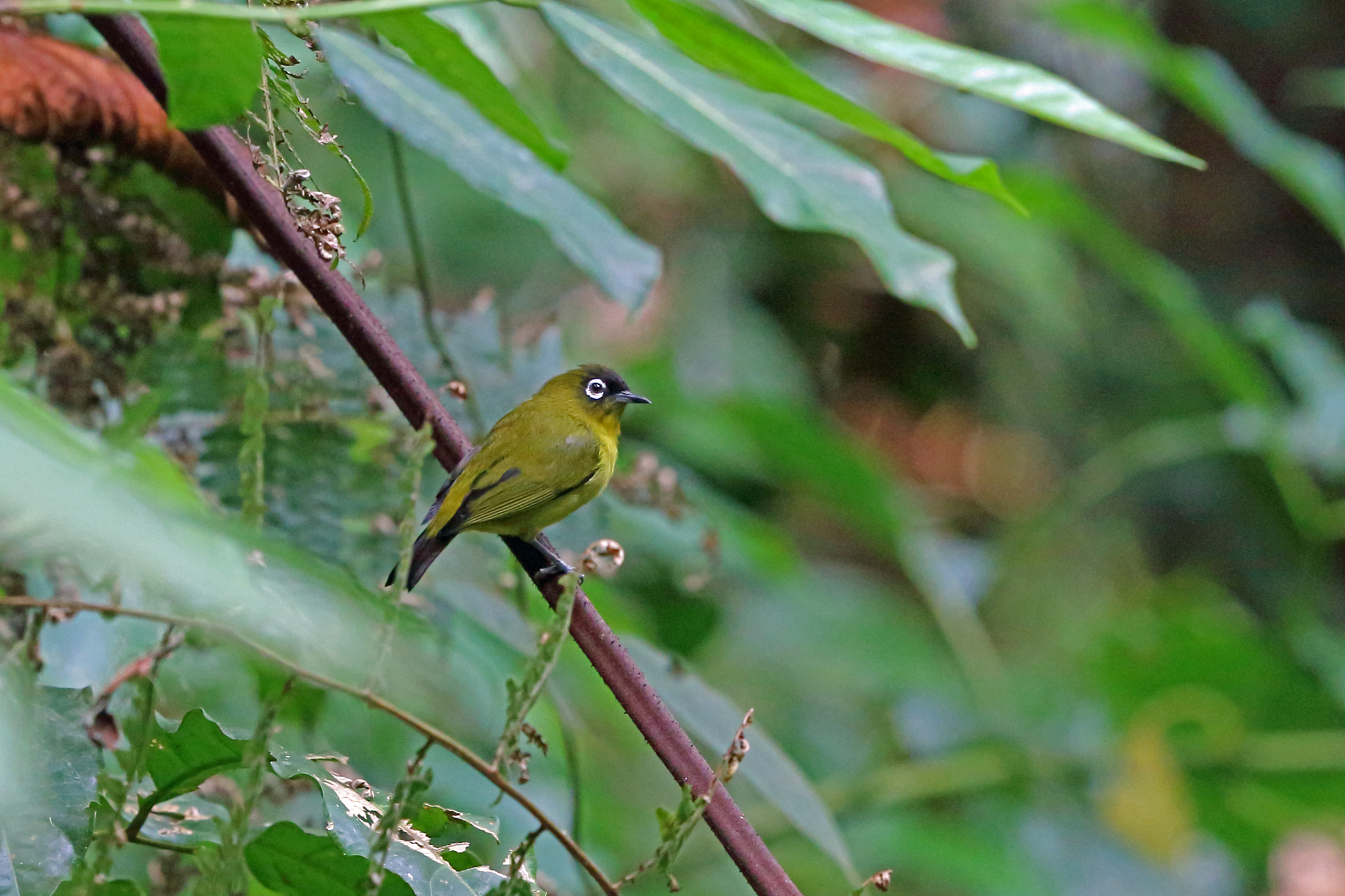

Conservation status
- Least Concern (IUCN 3.1)

Scientific classification
- Kingdom: Animalia
- Phylum: Chordata
- Class: Aves
- Order: Passeriformes
- Family: Zosteropidae
- Genus: Zosterops
- Species: Z. fuscicapilla

Binomial name
- Zosterops fuscicapilla Salvadori, 1876

= Capped white-eye =

Species of bird

The capped white-eye (Zosterops fuscicapilla) is a species of bird in the family Zosteropidae. It is found in New Guinea. Its natural habitat is in subtropical or tropical moist montane forests. It has a white eye ring, round wings, and strong legs. The capped white-eyes are sociable and live in large flocks. The Oya Tabu white-eye of the D'Entrecasteaux Islands has sometimes been considered to be a distinct species.

== Taxonomy ==
The capped white-eye was formally described in 1876 by the Italian zoologist Tommaso Salvadori under the current binomial name Zosterops fuscicapilla based on a specimen collected on Mount Arfak on the Bird's Head Peninsula of northwest New Guinea. The specific epithet fuscicapilla combines Latin fuscus meaning "dusky" or "brown" with "-capillus" meaning "-capped".

Two subspecies are recognised:

- Z. f. fuscicapilla Salvadori, AT, 1876 – mountains of coastal northern New Guinea
- Z. f. crookshanki Mayr, E & Rand, AL, 1935 – Oya Tabu white-eye – mountains of Goodenough Island, in D'Entrecasteaux Archipelago (off southeastern New Guinea)

The subspecies Z. f. crookshanki has sometimes been considered as a separate species, the Oya Tabu white-eye, based on the differences in plumage, iris colour, and vocalization.

== Distribution ==
The capped white-eye is found only in the mountains of New Guinea, as well as on Goodenough Island in the neighboring D'Entrecasteaux Islands. In New Guinea, it is distributed across the northern coastal mountains, the central mountain range, and the Arfak Mountains. Its natural habitat is montane tropical moist forests. The extent of occurrence is 442,000 km^{2} (109,000,000 acres).

== Ecology ==
These birds live at an elevation of 750–2,600 m (2,460–8,530 ft) above sea level. They have a medium dependency to forested areas. Due to tree cover having declined by 2% within its mapped range in the past ten years, it is expected that up to a 19% decline of the population has occurred.
