= Torea Airport =

Airport in West Papua, Indonesia

Torea Airport Bandar Udara Torea
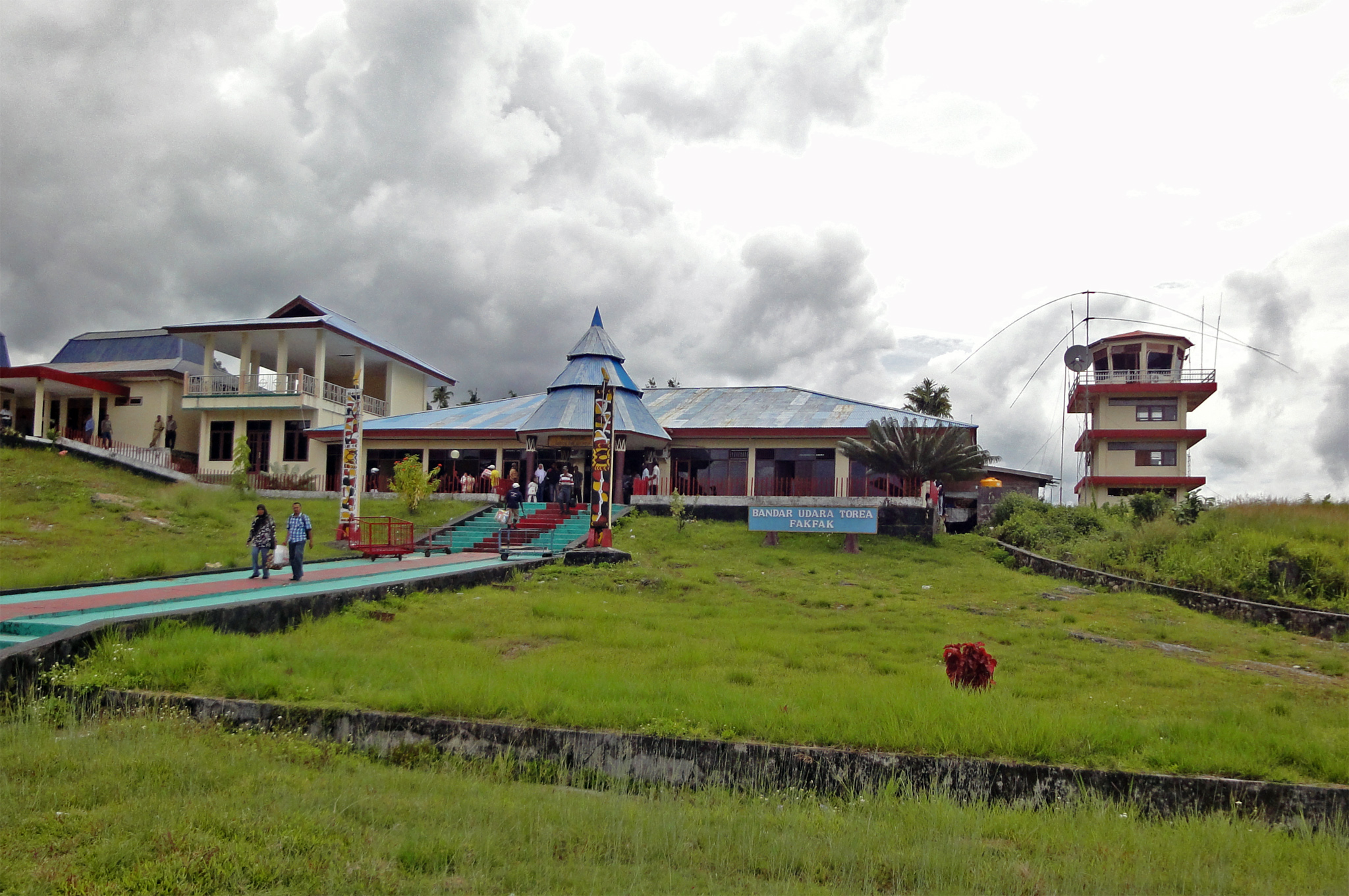
- IATA: ~~FKQ~~; ICAO: ~~WASF~~

Summary
- Airport type: Defunct
- Owner: Fakfak Government
- Operator: Ministry of Transportation
- Serves: Fakfak, West Papua, Indonesia
- Elevation AMSL: 462 ft (141 m)
- Coordinates: 02°55′12″S 132°16′01″E

Map
- Location in West Papua Location in Indonesian Papua Location in Indonesia

Runways
Direction	Length		Surface
Direction	m	ft	Surface
~~10/28~~	~~1,200~~	~~3,937~~	~~Asphalt~~
- Source: DAFIF

Torea Airport (Indonesian: Bandar Udara Torea) ~~(IATA: FKQ, ICAO: WASF)~~, also known as Fak Fak Airport, was an airport serving the town of Fakfak, in the province of West Papua in Indonesia.

== History ==
In around the 1950s, the runway was built, when this region was still under Dutch rule as Dutch New Guinea, this airport was named (Luchthaven Fakfak)

In April 1970, it was renamed as Torea Civil Airport.

The airport closed following the opening of the larger Siboru Airport on January 25, 2024.

== Facilities ==
The airport is at an elevation of 462 feet (141 m) above mean sea level. It has one runway designated 10/28 with an asphalt surface measuring 1,200 by 30 metres (3,937 ft × 98 ft).
