= Bintuni Bay =

Gulf on the waters of West Papua, Indonesia

- Teluk Bintuni (Indonesian)
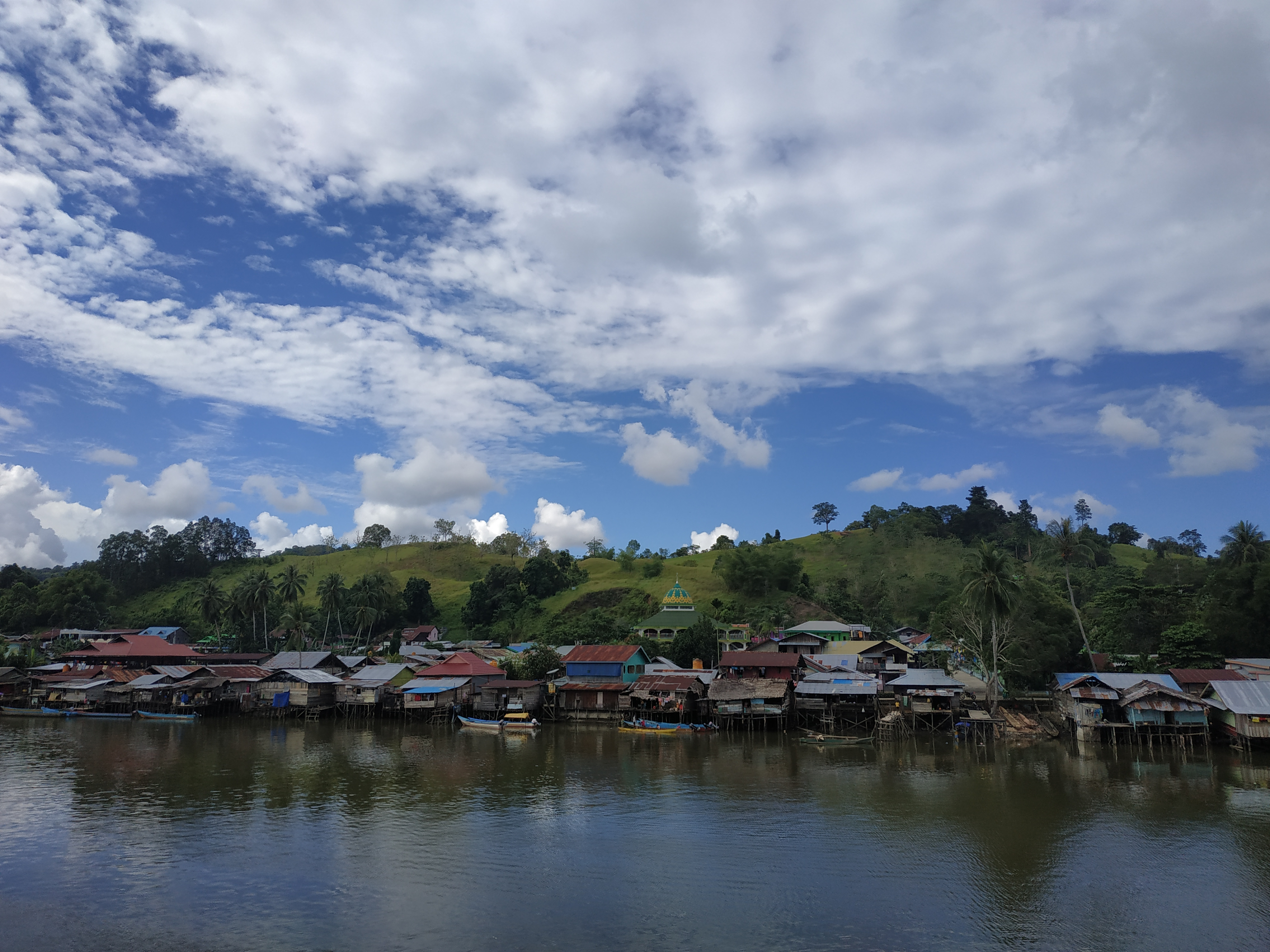

- Bintuni Bay as shown relative to Western New Guinea
- Location: New Guinea
- Coordinates: 02°20′S 133°25′E
- Primary outflows: Berau Gulf
- Basin countries: Indonesia
Bintuni Bay Nature Reserve
- Teluk Bintuni Nature Reserve
- IUCN category Ia (strict nature reserve)
- Interactive map of Bintuni Bay Nature Reserve
- Area: 1,248.51 km^{2} (482.05 sq mi)
- Designation: Nature reserve
- Governing body: Balai Besar Konservasi Sumber Daya Alam Papua Barat

Bintuni Bay (Indonesian: Teluk Bintuni) is the eastward extension or inner bay of Berau Gulf in western New Guinea. It separates the Bird's Head Peninsula on the north from the Bomberai Peninsula on the south. Administratively it is part of West Papua, Indonesia. The bay is 12 miles (19.3 km) wide at its entrance and there are extensive marshes along the shore.

Bintuni Bay is located on the Southern end of the Bird's Head Peninsula in West Papua, Indonesia. The bay is elongated with a total length of 160km and 70km wide at the mouth. Bintuni Bay is the inner bay with extensive river and mangrove habitats, known for one of the largest contiguous mangrove forests in the world, covering approximately 300,000 hectares of area on land and another 600,000 hectares to the 10m water depth. Mangrove forests play an important role in the ecosystem because they serve as a habitat for various types of animals, including birds, fish, and other marine biota. Mangrove forests in Bintuni Bay also serve as natural protection from coastal erosion, abrasion, and function in mitigating climate change by absorbing large amounts of carbon. More than 30 species of mangroves have been recorded growing in Bintuni Bay, reflecting the extraordinary biodiversity of the area. Undisturbed mangrove stands can grow up to 30 meters high, making it one of the most magnificent and pristine mangrove areas in Indonesia. With the area of mangrove forest it has, Bintuni Bay is the second largest in the world after the Sundarbans, a mangrove forest area located on the border between India and Bangladesh.

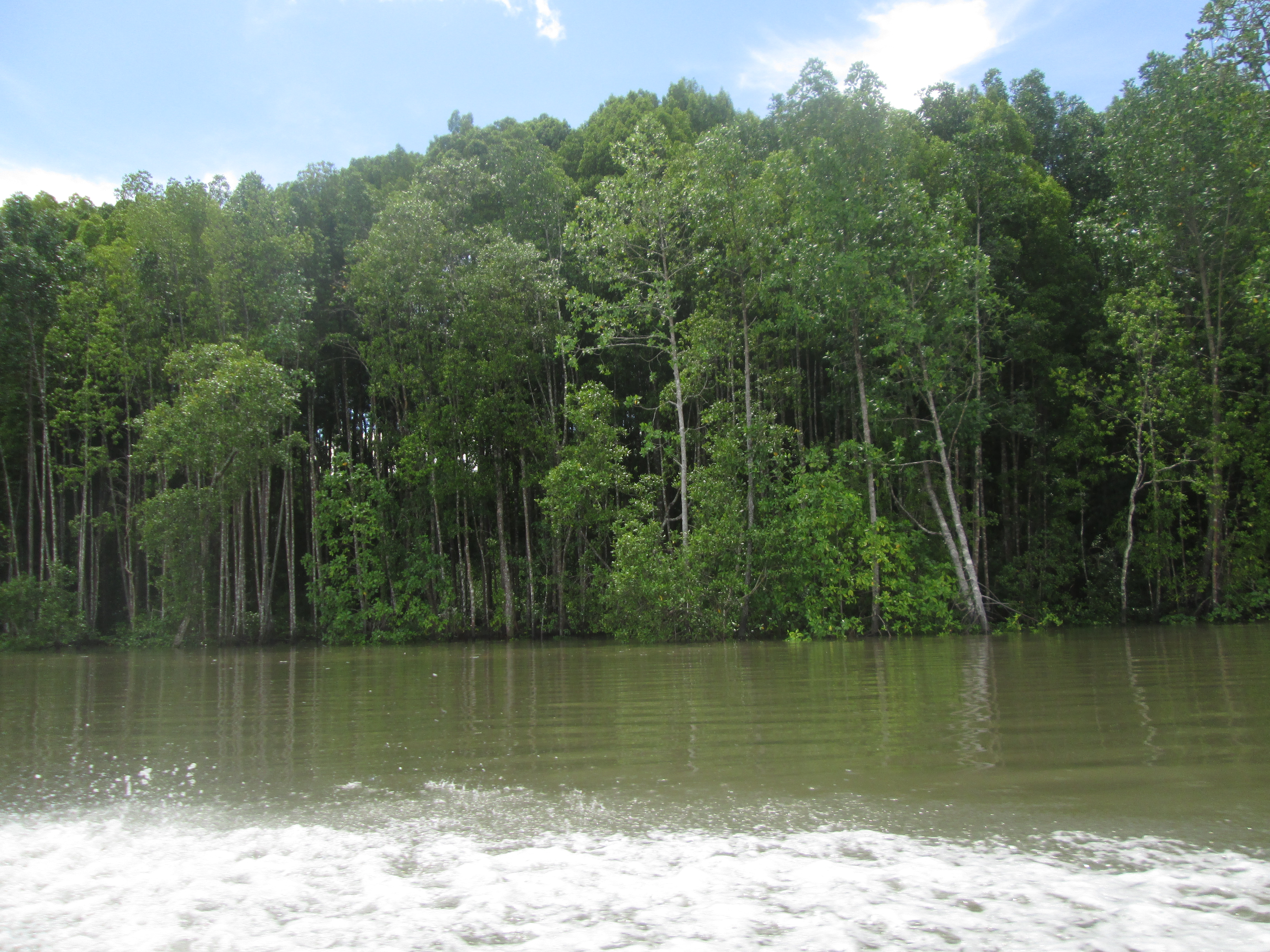
The Bintuni Bay Mangroves

Bintuni Bay Nature Reserve, also known as Teluk Bintuni Nature Reserve, protects the mangrove wetlands in the northeastern portion of the bay. It has an area of 1248.51 km^{2}. In addition to its ecological value, the mangrove area in Bintuni Bay also has economic value. Many local communities depend on the mangrove forest for their livelihoods, such as fishing, collecting non-timber forest products, and ecotourism. Conservation of mangrove forests in this area is very important, considering the threats from illegal logging, changes in land use, and potential exploitation for industrial interests. Conservation efforts involving the government, local communities, and various environmental organizations are important steps to ensure the sustainability of this rich mangrove ecosystem.

== See also ==
- KRI Teluk Bintuni, named for the bay
