= Kingdom of Iha =

Pre-colonial polity in the Moluccas

Banner of Iha

The Kingdom of Iha was an Islamic kingdom located in Saparua island, Maluku. Around the Dutch colonial period, there existed two well-known kingdoms in Saparua island, Iha and Honimoa (Siri Sori Islam). Both were quite influential Islamic empires known as sapanolua. This means two boat or two boats. It means Saparua island has two large peninsula thereon two ruling kings controlling a vast land. While the southeast peninsula was controlled by the King of Honimoa with his kingdom (Kingdom of Honimoa/ Siri Sori), the north peninsula was the regional power of the Kingdom of Iha. The Kingdom of Iha was involved in a series of struggles against the Dutch colonization of Maluku that later led to the Iha War (1632-1651) which resulted in a loss of some areas of this kingdom as well as its citizens which led to the later deterioration of the kingdom.
