= Rar Gwamar Airport =

Airport in Indonesia

Rar Gwamar Airport Bandar Udara Rar Gwamar
- IATA: DOB; ICAO: WAPD

Summary
- Owner: Government of Indonesia
- Operator: Indonesian Ministry of Transportation
- Serves: Dobo
- Location: Aru Islands, Indonesia
- Time zone: WITA (UTC+09:00)
- Coordinates: 5°46′18″S 134°12′45″E

Map
- Location of the airport in Maluku

Runways
Direction	Length		Surface
Direction	ft	m	Surface
05/23	4,593	1,400	Asphalt

Rar Gwamar Airport (IATA: DOB, ICAO: WAPD) is an airport in Dobo, Aru Islands, Indonesia. The airport is the principal point of entry to the Aru Islands and is about 5 km (3.1 mi) from Dobo city center. It is planned that the current 1,400-meter (4,600 ft) runway will be extended to 1,800 meters (5,900 ft) according to the master plan. The runway extension will be done gradually, starting from 1,500 meters (4,900 ft) which is planned to be finished by 2018.

== Airlines and destinations ==
Airlines	Destinations
Susi Air	Fakfak
Wings Air	Ambon, Langgur
