= Onin language =

Austronesia language spoken in Indonesia

Onin
- Native to: Indonesia
- Region: Kokas District, Teluk Patipi District, Fakfak Regency, Bomberai Peninsula
- Native speakers: (500 cited 2000)
- Language family: Austronesian: Malayo-Polynesian (MP); Central–Eastern MP; Kei–Tanimbar; Yamdena–North Bomberai; North Bomberai; Sekar Onim; Onin

Language codes
- ISO 639-3: oni
- Glottolog: onin1245
- ELP: Onin

Pidgin Onin
- Native to: Indonesia
- Region: Bomberai Peninsula
- Native speakers: None
- Language family: Onin-based pidgin

Language codes
- ISO 639-3: onx
- Glottolog: onin1237

Onin or Onim is a dialect of Sekar Onim language, an Austronesian language of the Onin Peninsula in Bomberai, West Papua. Despite the small number of speakers, it is the basis of a local pidgin.

It has 18 consonants and 5 vowels.
