= Sebakor Bay =

Bay in West Papua, Indonesia

- Teluk Sebakor (Indonesian)
- Location within West Papua (province) Location within Western New Guinea
- Location: South East Asia
- Coordinates: 03°35′00″S 132°50′00″E
- Type: Bay
- Primary inflows: Ceram Sea
- Basin countries: Indonesia

Sebakor Bay (Indonesian: Teluk Sebakor), is a bay on the west of Bomberai Peninsula in Province of West Papua.

The Karas Islands, alongside a few smaller islands, are located in the bay.

== History ==
First recorded sighting by Europeans of Sebakor Bay and Karas Island was by the Spanish expedition of Luís Vaez de Torres on 30 October 1606. Sebakor Bay was charted by the Spaniards as Bahía Bermeja (Reddish Bay in Spanish). Sabakor is the name of the tribal troops from this region under the influence of Narawatu of the Kaimana Kingdom for fighting Hongi wars (Hongitochten).
