= Iha language =

Papuan language spoken in Indonesia

Iha
- Matta, Kapaur
- Native to: Indonesia
- Region: West Papua (Bomberai Peninsula)
- Native speakers: (5,500 cited 1987)
- Language family: Trans–New Guinea: West Trans–New Guinea; West Bomberai; Mbaham–Iha; Iha

Language codes
- ISO 639-3: ihp
- Glottolog: ihaa1241

Pidgin Iha
- Native to: Indonesia
- Region: West Papua (Bomberai Peninsula)
- Native speakers: None
- Language family: Iha-based pidgin

Language codes
- ISO 639-3: ihb
- Glottolog: ihab1241
- ELP: Iha Based Pidgin

Iha (Matta, Kapaur) is a Papuan language spoken by the Mbaham-Matta people (primarily Matta) of the Bomberai Peninsula in West Papua Province, Indonesia. It is the basis of a pidgin used as the local trade language.

== Phonology ==
Consonants
		Labial	Dental/ Alveolar	Palatal	Velar	Labio- dorsal	Uvular	Glottal
Nasal		m	n		ŋ			
Plosive/ Affricate	voiceless	p	t̪	(t͡ʃ)		q͡p	q	
Plosive/ Affricate	voiced	(b)	d̪	(d͡ʒ)			ɢ	
Plosive/ Affricate	prenasalized	ᵐb	ⁿd		ᵑɡ	ᵑᵐɡ͡b		
Fricative	voiceless	(f)	s					h
Fricative	voiced	β						
Approximant			l	j		w		
Tap/Flap			ɾ					

- Marginal phonemes are in parentheses.

Vowels
	Front	Central	Back
Close	i		u
Close-mid	e		o
Open-mid	ɛ		ɔ
Open		a	

- /i a/ can also have allophones [ɪ ə].

== Pronouns ==
Flassy and Animung (1992) list the following pronouns for Iha.

		singular	plural
1st person	exclusive	on	mbi
1st person	inclusive	on	in
2nd person		ko	ki
3rd person		mi	wat/mi
