= Fakfak =

- Town (District)
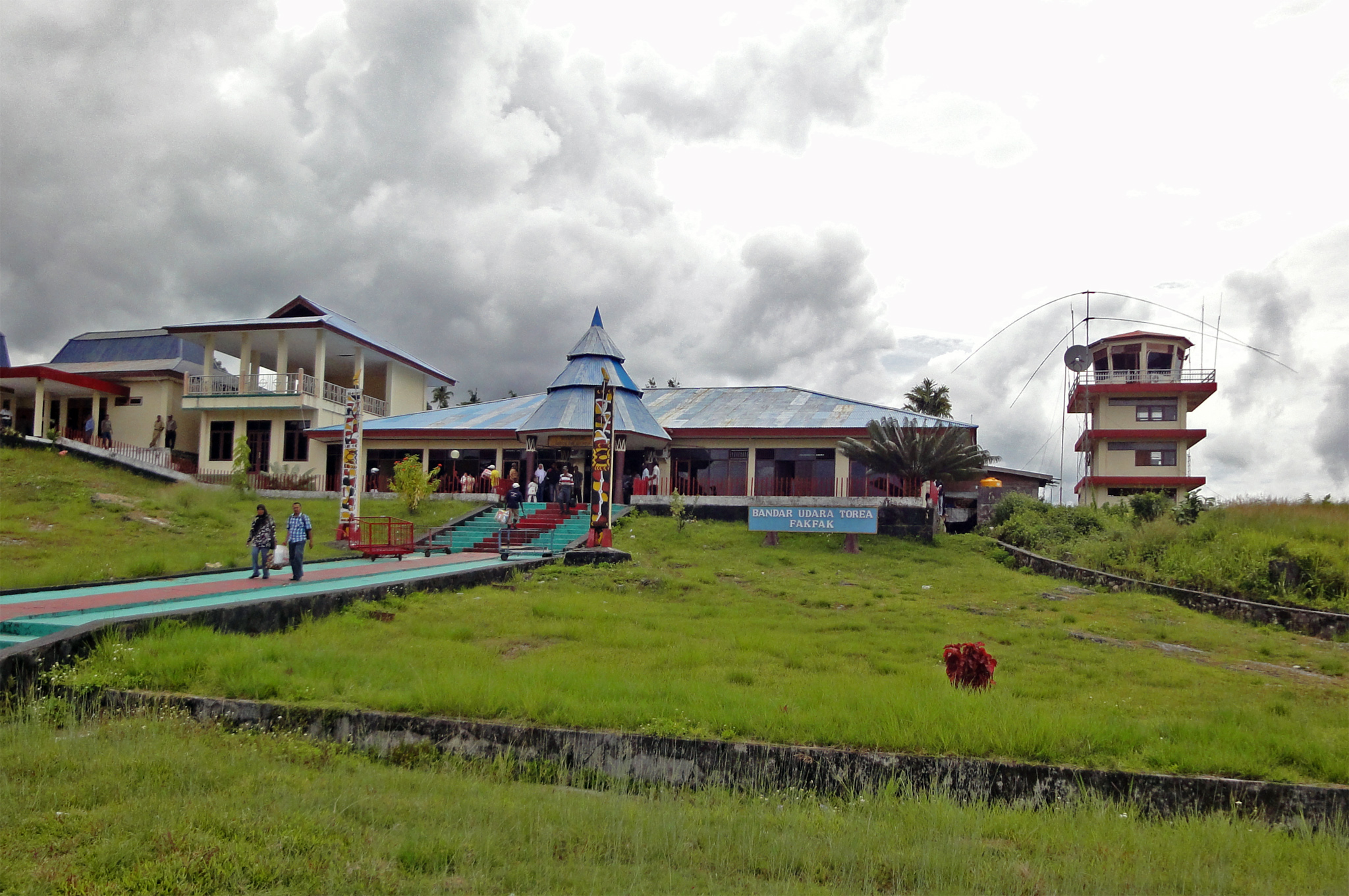
- Fakfak Airport

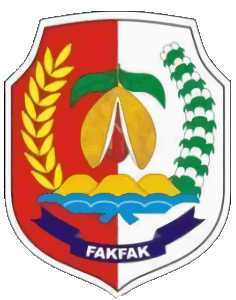
- Seal

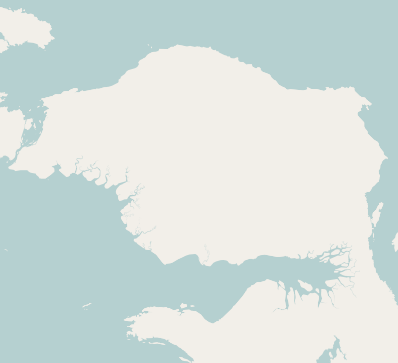
- Location of the town in relation to the Bird's Head Peninsula Location of the town in Indonesia
- Coordinates: 2°55′0″S 132°18′0″E
- Country: Indonesia
- Province: West Papua
- Regency: Fakfak Regency

Area
  - Total: 233 km^{2} (90 sq mi)

Population (mid 2024 estimate)
  - Total: 17,718
  - Density: 76.0/km^{2} (197/sq mi)
- Time zone: UTC+9 (WIT)

Fakfak ([ˈfaʔfaʔ]) is an administrative district (distrik) in West Papua Province of Indonesia. It includes two urban villages (kelurahan) of North Fakfak (Fakfak Utara) and South Fakfak (Fakfak Selatan); together they form the town of Fakfak, which is the seat of the Fakfak Regency. The district covers an area of 233 km^{2}, and had a population of 12,566 at the 2010 Census, which rose to 18,900 at the 2020 Census; the official estimate as at mid 2024 was 17,718. It is served by Fakfak Airport. It is the only town in West Papua with a significant Muslim Indian and Arab Indonesian presence. There's a Mr DIY in North Fakfak.

== History ==
The former name of the settlement was Kapaur and it is still in use by biologists. Historically Fakfak was a significant port town, being one of the few Papuan towns that had relations with the Sultanate of Ternate, being bound to it. The Sultanate later granted the Dutch colonial government permission to settle in Papua, including in Fakfak. The Dutch began settlement in 1898. The town still has some colonial buildings remaining from this settlement.

The Japanese 1st Detachment landed in Fakfak on April 1, 1942. The small Royal Netherlands East Indies Army garrison surrendered without a fight and later a small garrison of 67 men of the 24th Special Base Unit occupied the area and used it as a seaplane base. Between April 1943 and October 1944, the town was attacked several times by allied bombers. Japanese forces occupied the town until the end of the war in September 1945.

Fakfak is now an isolated town, not often used for the import and export of goods.

== Geography ==
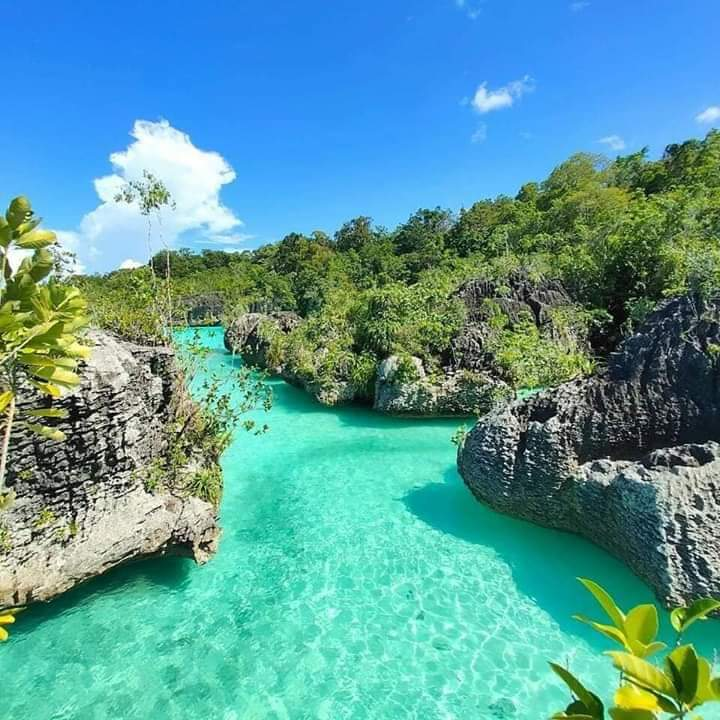
Toran Bay, south of Fakfak

Fakfak is located in West Papua, Indonesia, on the Bomberai Peninsula at the foothills of the Fakfak Mountains, near Tambaruni Bay. It is situated in an area with many limestone hills, rivers and caves. As such, the streets twist and turn.

== Climate ==
Climate data for Fakfak (2000–2020)
Month	Jan	Feb	Mar	Apr	May	Jun	Jul	Aug	Sep	Oct	Nov	Dec	Year
Mean daily maximum °C (°F)	30.6 (87.1)	30.6 (87.1)	30.6 (87.1)	29.9 (85.8)	29.5 (85.1)	28.4 (83.1)	27.7 (81.9)	27.4 (81.3)	28.3 (82.9)	29.4 (84.9)	30.3 (86.5)	30.6 (87.1)	29.4 (85.0)
Mean daily minimum °C (°F)	22.8 (73.0)	22.6 (72.7)	22.6 (72.7)	22.8 (73.0)	22.9 (73.2)	22.5 (72.5)	22.1 (71.8)	22.0 (71.6)	22.3 (72.1)	22.6 (72.7)	22.9 (73.2)	23.1 (73.6)	22.6 (72.7)
Average precipitation mm (inches)	290.6 (11.44)	216.4 (8.52)	216.4 (8.52)	296.1 (11.66)	354.6 (13.96)	434.0 (17.09)	354.7 (13.96)	298.7 (11.76)	280.4 (11.04)	237.0 (9.33)	165.9 (6.53)	210.1 (8.27)	3,354.9 (132.08)
Average precipitation days	16.2	14.5	14.5	15.8	17.1	18.3	19.2	18.1	16.6	14.3	13.6	15.0	193.2
Source: Meteomanz

== Demographics ==
Fakfak has a small community of Muslim Arab and Indian Indonesians, descended from traders and religious teachers who came to Papua in the 19th century and possibly earlier; this minority population has decreased recently due to Fakfak's diminishing role as a port town. It is the only place in West Papua with such a community.

The local Papuan population are majority Muslim, with sizable minorities of Catholics and Protestants. Islamization in Fakfak occurred due to Fakfak being part of the broader trading relationship with the Maluku Islands, intermarriages between traders with native nutmeg producing tribes, informal religious education through Muslim missionaries, and through political channels as native kingdoms and their aristocracy adopted Islam.

== Cultural identity ==
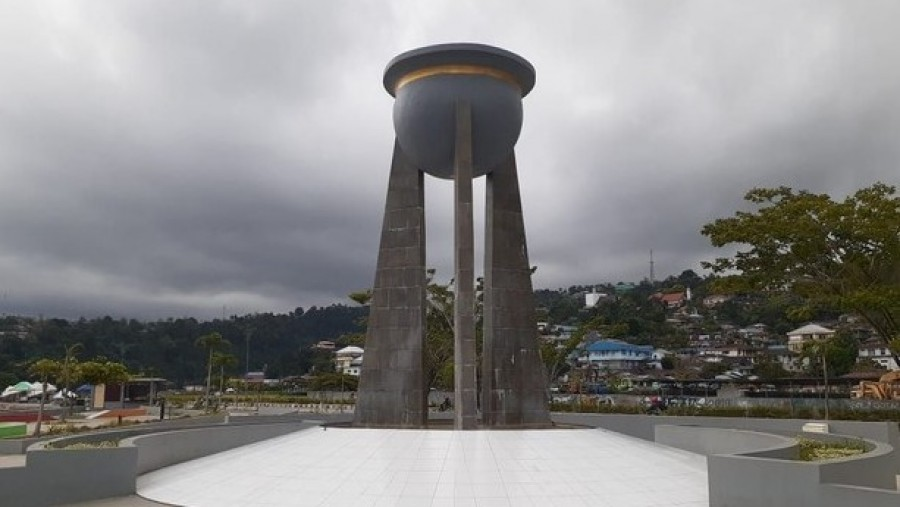
Satu Tungku Tiga Batu Monument

The local philosophy is called “Satu tungku tiga batu” which means a stove/cauldron with three stones/legs. The majority of local ethnic groups are member of Mbaham Matta Wuh, who traditionally cook with cauldron which is balanced over three stones. The cauldron symbolizes life, while the three stones symbolizes the pronouns you, me, and they. Another saying to reflect this is “Ko, on, kno mi mbi du Qpona” which means you, me, and they are related. This forms the basis for religious tolerance in the area as Fakfak is a majority Muslim area while also having a sizable Christian minority. Whatever the religion the people are still considered family. There is a monument symbolizing this philosophy located in the center of Fakfak to commemorate its multiculturalism and tolerance. Due to historically being under the control of Ternate but being located in West Papua, Fakfak is torn between being pro-Indonesian or supporting the Free Papua Movement.

== Tourism ==
Fakfak has 1.5 kilometres (0.93 mi) of white sand beaches, located approximately half an hour from the town. Nearby there are also rock paintings. It is served by the Fakfak Airport.

== Bibliography ==
- Backshall, Stephen (2002). Rough Guide to Indonesia. London: Rough Guides. ISBN 1-85828-991-2. OCLC 59463950.
- Chauvel, Richard (2005). Constructing Papuan nationalism: history, ethnicity, and adaption. Washington, D.C.: East-West Center. ISBN 1-74104-830-3. OCLC 310400596.
- Noor, Farish (10 February 2010). "The Arrival and Spread of Tablighi Jama'at in West Papua (Irian Jaya), Indonesia" (PDF). S. Rajaratnam School of International Studies. Archived from the original (PDF) on 2011-10-01.
- Ver Berkmoes, Ryan (2010). Indonesia. Footscray, Victoria: Lonely Planet. ISBN 978-1-932728-26-2. OCLC 61748548.
