= Bomberai Peninsula =

Peninsula in Indonesia

Native name: Semenanjung Bomberai
- Location within Western New Guinea

Geography
- Coordinates: 03°09′19.15″S 133°10′15.6″E
- Adjacent to: Seram Sea; Bintuni Bay

Administration
- Indonesia
- Province: West Papua
- Largest settlement: Fakfak

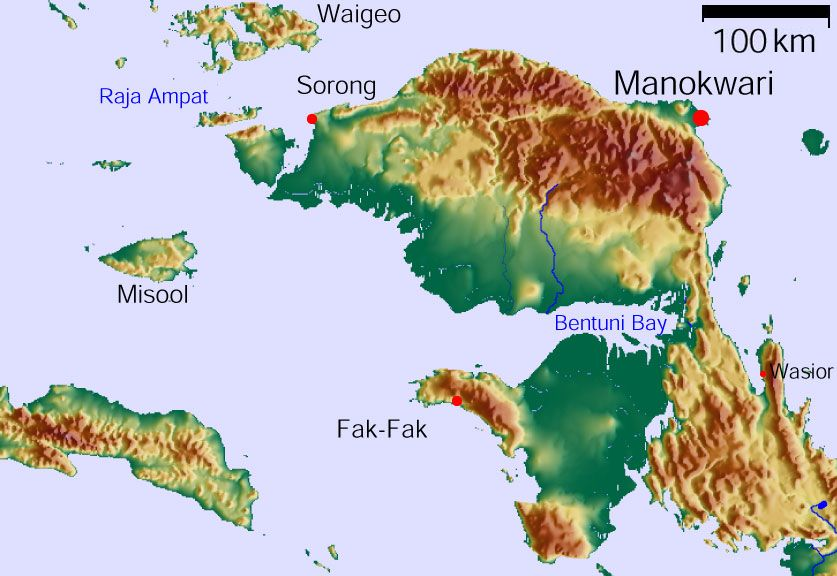
Vogelkop Peninsula, West Papua (Indonesia)

Bomberai Peninsula (Indonesian: Semenanjung Bomberai) is located in the Western New Guinea region. It is south of the Bird's Head Peninsula, and Bintuni Bay separates the two peninsulas. To the west lies the Sebakor Bay and to the south Kamrau Bay. On the southeast Arguni Bay lies between the peninsula and the Bird's Neck Isthmus.

Sabuda island lies off the western tip of the peninsula, and is separated from the mainland by Berau and Bintuni straits.

== Geography ==
The entire peninsula is covered by a dense tropical rainforest. Most of the peninsula consists of a marshy plain, covered in lowland rainforest. There are smaller areas of montane rainforest in the Fakfak and Kumawa mountains along the peninsula's western edge. Together with the eastern region of Bird's Head Peninsula and offshore islands, the Bomberai Peninsula forms the Indonesian province of West Papua (Indonesian: Papua Barat). The western part of the peninsula is part of Fakfak Regency, the north belongs to Teluk Bintuni Regency and the southeast to Kaimana Regency. It is a wide peninsula that opens to the Seram Sea, forming a wide bay, Sebakor Bay, defined by two small peninsulas:

- to the northwest is the Onin Peninsula part of Fakfak Regency, includes Fakfak, the main town and port of the region. The Fakfak Mountains reach 1619 m (5312 ft) elevation. Due to the facilities offered by the town of Fakfak, this part of the Bomberai Peninsula is the most visited.
- to the southeast is the peninsula formed by the Kumawa Mountains, whose south coast is bathed by the Arafura Sea. It is a region little explored by europeans tourists and almost unknown to them. The region is historically called Sran and later Kowiai after the people and kingdom and the southern coast is part of Kaimana Regency and its main town and port Kaimana.

To the north lie Berau Bay and Bintuni Bay, which separate the Bomberai Peninsula from the Bird's Head peninsula. Off the north coast are located the islands of Amutu Besar, Asap, Arguni and Ugar. Opposite is the island of Panjang in Tamaruni Bay.

Further south are Samai Island and Sebakor Bay, which is protected from the offshore island of Karas by the Tamaruni Bay. Southeast beyond the Nautilus Strait (Indonesian: Selat Nautilus) is Adi Island. In the east, Kamrau Bay separates the peninsula from the rest of New Guinea. At its northernmost point lies the island of Freterenusu in the bay. Only narrow land bridges connect the Bomberai Peninsula with the neighboring land masses.

The Terumbu Karang Sehat Indonesia programme implemented by Konservasi Indonesia has supported local marine protected-area management in the Bomberai area, including work on institutional and financing arrangements.

== History ==
There were trading relationships that formed based on birds of paradise feathers with 7th century Sriwijaya and the surrounding islands.

There was a mention of "Wwanin" and "Sran" in a 14th-century Nagarakretagama manuscript as a region/tributary of Majapahit. Scholars tends to attribute this to Onin Peninsula and the southern region of Sran or Kowiai referring to the kingdom of Namatota, which if true represent the earliest mention of a native names of Papuan regions.

The first sighting by Europeans of this zone was in 1606, in the Spanish expedition commanded by Luís Vaz de Torres. This region alongside others mainly the Western part of New Guinea became part of Sultanate of Tidore under the expansion of its influence led by the legendary figure Gurabesi. The Dutch constructed Fort Du Bus in 1828 on Triton Bay in the current Kaimana Regency and formalised Tidore rule over this region (and Tidore's protectorate status under Netherlands) by appointing three local rulers Sendawan (King of Namatota), Kassa (King of Lahakia) and Lutu ("Orang Kaya" from Lobo and Mawara) under which many local kingdoms and tribes swear fealty. However the Fort was abandoned in 1835 due to the unhealthy climate and attacks by natives, and the Dutch generally left the rule and collection of taxes of these region under Tidore, which in turn delegated them to regional rulers, like Misool which collected tributes from Onin kingdoms.

The Dutch colonial authorities began to govern more directly late 19th century with the ending of hongi fleets and slave trading of Tidore in 1850, followed by the agreement on 1872 with Tidore which made the Sultan explicit only had right on feudal matters, and the sovereignty if New Guinea rest in Dutch East Indies government, in practice allowed them to establish administrations in New Guinea. In 1898 the Netherlands Indies government decided to establish administrative posts in Fakfak and Manokwari, followed by Merauke in 1902. Tidore throne became vacant in 1905 and the lack of ruler diminished its autonomy. By 1909 Tidore signed away its independence and in 1910 Bacan and Tidore signed contract invalidating all their previous contracts and its region became part of Dutch East Indies, although still retained some jurisdiction in New Guinea until 1911 where further legislation was enacted to curtail it.

== Languages ==
There are several Central–Eastern Malayo-Polynesian languages spoken on the Bomberai Peninsula, including Uruangnirin, Onin, Sekar, Arguni, Bedoanas, Erokwanas, Irarutu, and Kowiai.

Language isolates spoken in the Bomberai Peninsula are Mor and Tanah Merah.

The West Bomberai languages Baham and Iha are also spoken on the peninsula, as well as the Asmat-Kamoro languages Buruwai and Kamberau, and the South Bird's Head language Kemberano. The Timor–Alor–Pantar languages may possibly have lexical links with the West Bomberai languages, although this proposal is not without controversy.

Karas, a West Bomberai language, is spoken on Karas Island, a small island located just off the western coast of the Bomberai Peninsula.

== Fauna ==
Twenty-four endemic species of rainbow fish (Melanotaenia) live on the Bird's Head Peninsula, Bomberai Peninsula and offshore islands. Many live in the karst areas, including the Harlequin Rainbow Fish (Melanotaenia boesemani).

Fauna of the Fakfak Mountains includes the black-eared catbird and Oninia senglaubi, a member of the family of the narrow-mouthed frogs (Microhylidae).
