= Fakfak Regency =

Regency in West Papua, Indonesia

Fakfak Regency Kabupaten Fakfak
- Regency
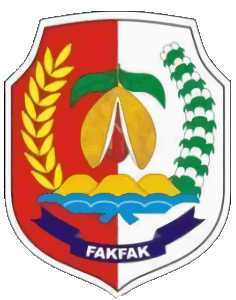
- Coat of arms

- Location in West Papua

- Location in Indonesia
- Coordinates: 2.9167°S 132.3000°E
- Country: Indonesia
- Province: West Papua
- Capital: Fakfak

Government
  - Regent: Samaun Dahlan
  - Vice Regent: Donatus Nimbitkendik

Area
  - Total: 14,320 km^{2} (5,530 sq mi)
- Highest elevation: 2,000 m (6,600 ft)
- Lowest elevation: 0 m (0 ft)

Population (mid 2024 estimate)
  - Total: 93,963
  - Density: 6.562/km^{2} (16.99/sq mi)
- Time zone: UTC+9 (IEST)
- Area code: (+62) 956
- Website: fakfakkab.go.id

Fakfak Regency is a regency of West Papua province of Indonesia. It covers an area of 14,320 km^{2} at the western end of the Bomberai Peninsula, and had a population of 66,828 at the 2010 Census and 87,894 at the 2020 Census; the official estimate as of mid-2024 was 93,963 (comprising 48,070 males and 45,893 females). The regency and its eponymous capital, Fakfak, are notable for being a Muslim-majority regency in the Protestant-majority island of Papua due to historic trading ties.

== Geography ==
Fakfak Regency was divided in 2002 into a reduced Fakfak Regency and a new Kaimana Regency, created by Law No. 26 of 2002, to be precise effective on 25 October 2002. The regency is geographically located at 131º 531 0311 east longitude - 133º 291 1911 east longitude and 2º 301 5811 – 3º 571 5111 LS. The land area of Fakfak Regency, following the division of 2002, is 14,320 km^{2}, consisting originally of four districts, which were later divided into nine districts (subdivided into 106 villages) in 2004, and subsequently redivided into seventeen districts (subdivided into 149 villages), of which the largest is Karas Distrik.

The southern half of the Regency comprises the districts of Wartutin, Fakfak Barat, Pariwari, Fakfak, Fakfak Tengah, Fakfak Timur Tengah, Fakfak Timur and Karas. The less well populated northern half of the Regency consists of the districts of Furwagi, Teluk Patipe, Kayauni, Kramongmongga, Kokas and Arguni in the west, and Mbahamdandara, Tomage and Bomberay in the east.

== Administrative districts ==
At the 2010 Census, the regency comprised nine districts (distrik), but subsequently eight additional districts have been created by splitting the original districts. These are tabulated below with their areas and their populations at the 2010 Census and the 2020 Census, together with the official estimates as of mid-2024. The table also includes the locations of the district administrative centres, the number of administrative villages (142 rural kampung and 7 urban kelurahan^{(a)} in total) and offshore islands in each district, and its post code.

Kode Kemendagri	Name of District (distrik)	Area in km^{2}	Pop'n 2010 Census	Pop'n 2020 Census	Pop'n mid 2024 Estimate	Admin centre	No. of villages	No. of islands	Post code
92.03.01	Fakfak	233	33,174	18,900	17,818	Fakfak	5	3	98011
92.03.02	Fakfak Barat (West Fakfak)	679	4,122	3,460	3,779	Werba	9	26	98022
92.03.03	Fakfak Timur (East Fakfak)	1,020	2,992	1,284	1,467	Weri	6	27	98027
92.03.04	Kokas	788	4,610	4,118	4,601	Kokas Kota	15	229	98016
92.03.05	Fakfak Tengah (Central Fakfak)	705	9,872	13,216	14,412	Raduria	14	2	98012
92.03.06	Karas	2,491	2,597	3,155	3,250	Malakuli	7	106	98032
92.03.07	Bomberay	1,023	2,950	1,903	2,440	Onim Sari	7	-	98026
92.03.08	Kramongmongga	746	2,737	2,046	2,326	Kramongmongga	10	-	98017
92.03.09	Teluk Patipe (Patipe Bay)	786	3,774	3,837	4,559	Patipi Pasir	13	55	98024
92.03.12	Fakfak Timur Tengah (East Central Fakfak)	701	^{(b)}	2,654	3,054	Krebelang	10	^{(c)}	98031
92.03.10	Pariwari	587	^{(b)}	23,670	24,924	Dulnpokpok	9	^{(c)}	98013
92.03.11	Wartutin	1,006	^{(b)}	2,261	2,469	Wartutin	6	^{(c)}	98025
92.03.13	Arguni	334	^{(b)}	1,150	1,255	Fior	5	^{(c)}	98014
92.03.14	Mbahamdandara	664	^{(b)}	1,011	1,184	Goras	7	^{(c)}	98021
92.03.16	Furwagi	732	^{(b)}	1,617	1,781	Rumbati	8	^{(c)}	98023
92.03.15	Kayauni	938	^{(b)}	1,697	2,006	Kayauni	9	^{(c)}	98015
82.03.17	Tomage	887	^{(b)}	1,915	2,638	Tomage	9	^{(c)}	98033
	Totals	14,320	66,828	87,894	93,963	Fakfak	149		

Note: (a) the 7 kelurahan are Fakfak Selatan (South Fakfak) and Fakfak Utara (North Fakfak) in Fakfak District, Danawaria in Fakfak Tengah District, Kokas Kota (Kokas Town) in Kokas District, and Dulanpokpok, Wagom and Wagom Utara in Pariwari District.
(b) the populations of the eight new districts in 2010 are included in the figures for the original districts from which each was later split off.
(c) the number of offshore islands in each of the eight new districts are included in the figures for the original districts from which each was later split off.

== Demographics ==
Religion in Fakfak (2023)
1. Islam (63.1%)
2. Protestantism (20.7%)
3. Roman Catholic (16.2%)
4. Hinduism (0.05%)
5. Buddhism (0.02%)
6. Others (0.00%)

The majority of the population is Muslim, the level of assimilation with the outside world has been very high for a long time (before Dutch colonization). In Fakfak Regency, there are old mosques from the 17th century, one of which is Patimburak Old Mosque which is located in Kokas District. This shows that Islam has entered Papua before the 17th century, some experts predict that it has been in since the 15th century. The people of Fakfak Regency highly uphold religious values, as evidenced by the creation of a slogan that has been around for generations in Fakfak Regency, namely Satu Tungku Tiga Batu. Based on data from Central Bureau of Statistics Fakfak Regency in 2020 which implements Islam, namely 57.79%, then Christian as much as 42.17% (Protestant 22.24% & Catholic 19.92%) and Buddhist Hindu around 0.03%. One of the largest churches in Fakfak is the Santo Yosep Fakfak Church.

== Industries ==
Fakfak Regency has plans for industrial development, including:

- PT. Priskila Prima Makmur (still a plan 2023)
- GEA RSA (the electronics industry) (still a plan 2026)
