= Deraya Air Taxi =

Airline based in Jakarta, Indonesia

IATA	ICAO	Call sign
-	DRY	DERAYA
- Founded: 1967
- Ceased operations: 2022
- Hubs: Husein Sastranegara Airport
- Fleet size: 1
- Headquarters: Jakarta, Indonesia
- Key people: Siti Rahayu Sumadi (Founder)
- Website: http://www.deraya.co.id

Deraya Air Taxi was an airline based in Jakarta, Indonesia. It operates commuter, charter, medical evacuation, and aerial photography services, as well as a flying school. Its main base is Halim Perdanakusuma International Airport, Jakarta, with a hub at Husein Sastranegara Airport, Bandung. Deraya Air Taxi is listed in category 2 by Indonesian Civil Aviation Authority for airline safety quality.

== History ==
The airline was established in March 1967 and started operations in 1967. It is wholly owned by the Boedihardjo Group. In January 2005 Deraya Air Taxi had its first Shorts 360 aircraft delivered.

In 2022, the airline ended operations when its sole aircraft was retired and transferred to Airfast Indonesia

== Destinations ==
Deraya Air Taxi operates the following services (at 2006):

Indonesia

- Java
  - Bandung – Husein Sastranegara Airport Hub
  - Jakarta – Halim Perdanakusuma International Airport Main Base
  - Semarang – Jenderal Ahmad Yani International Airport
- Kalimantan
  - Palangkaraya – Tjilik Riwut Airport
  - Pangkalanbun – Iskandar Airport
- Papua and Maluku
  - Ambon – Pattimura Airport
  - Babo – Babo Airport
  - Bula, Papua – Bula Airport
  - Kaimana – Kaimana Airport
  - Sorong – Sorong Airport
- Sumatra
  - Batam – Hang Nadim Airport
  - Lubuklinggau – Lubuklinggau Airport
  - Matak – Matak Airport
  - Palembang – Sultan Mahmud Badaruddin II International Airport
  - Pangkal Pinang – Depati Amir Airport

Singapore - Seletar Airport

== Fleet ==
=== Current ===
The Deraya Air Taxi fleet includes the following aircraft (as of November 2021):

- 1 Boeing 737-300

=== Former ===
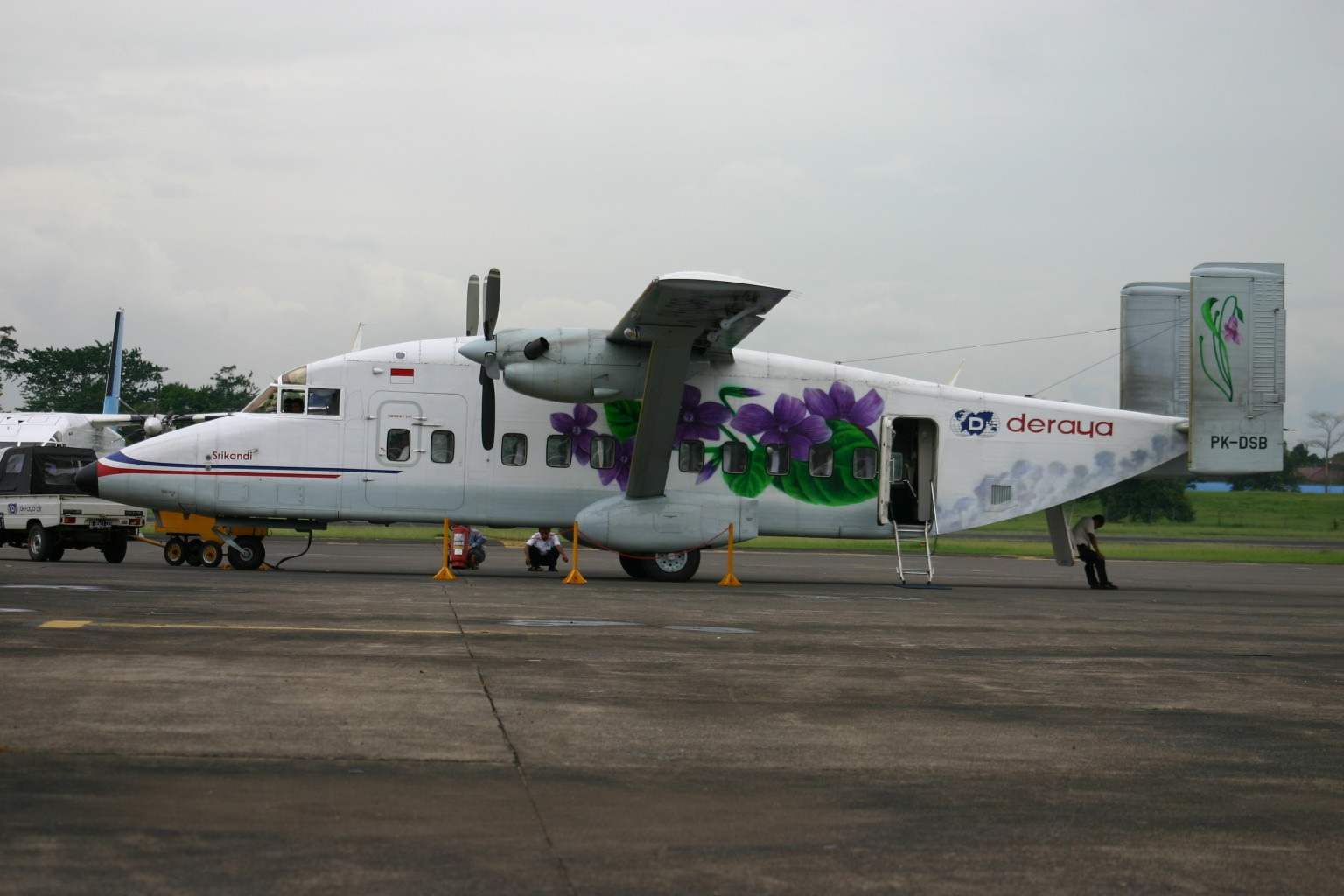
Deraya Air Shorts 330

- 2 British Aerospace ATPF
- 2 Indonesian Aerospace 212-100
- 2 Shorts 330-100
- 2 Shorts 360-300

== Accidents and incidents ==
- In November 1982, Indonesian Aerospace 212-100 PK-DCR of Deraya Air Taxi and PT Pupuk Kaltim was damaged when it approaching Bontang. No fatalities in this accident.
