= WASO =

WASO may refer to:

- Waso, a month in the traditional Burmese calendar that marks the beginning of the traditional Buddhist retreat during the rainy season
- WASO (AM), a defunct radio station (730 AM) formerly licensed to Covington, Louisiana, United States
- West Australian Symphony Orchestra, the premier professional orchestra of the state of Western Australia
- Worms: A Space Oddity, a video game
- Babo Airport, in Babo, Western New Guinea, Indonesia (ICAO code WASO)
- Washington Office (WASO), the central administrative office of the National Park Service; see Organization of the National Park Service
- Wake After Sleep Onset, a measure of the time spent awake after first falling asleep, often used in somnology
- waso, a word in Toki Pona meaning "bird"
