= BxB =

BXB is the IATA code for Babo Airport, Indonesia

BxB or BXB may refer to:

- BXB (group), South Korean boy band
- Broxbourne railway station, Hertfordshire, National Rail station code
- BxB Hulk, Japanese wrestler
- BxB Dating sim games
