= Merpati Nusantara Airlines Flight 724 =

1993 aviation accident

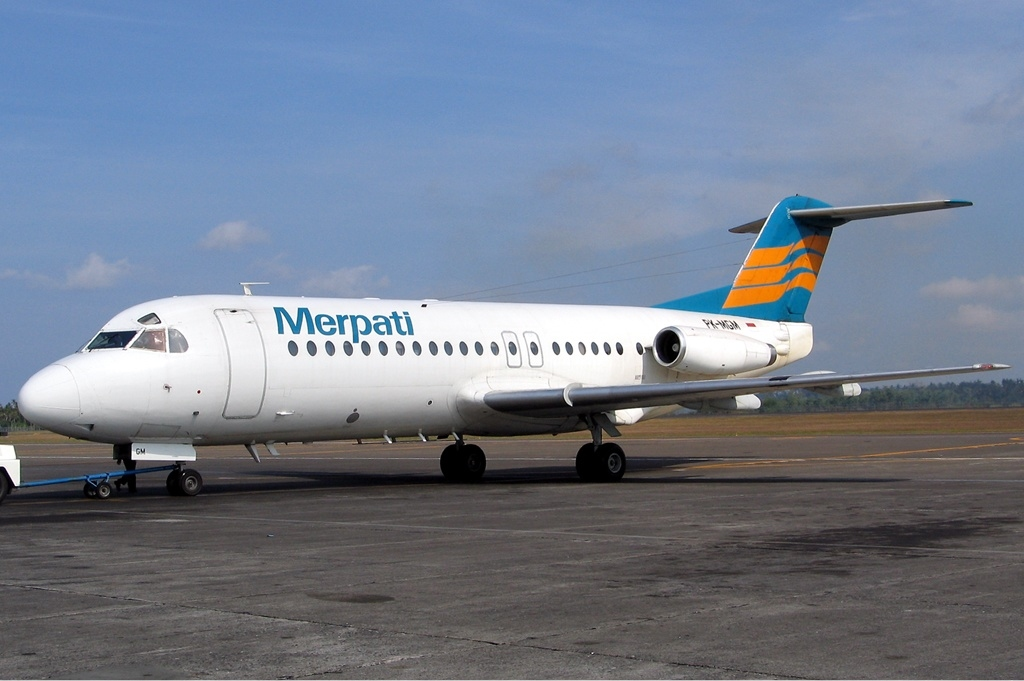
- A Merpati Nusantara Airlines Fokker F28 Fellowship similar to the crashed aircraft

Accident
- Date: 1 July 1993
- Summary: Controlled flight into terrain due to pilot error
- Site: Near Jefman Airport, Sorong, West Papua, Indonesia; 0°54′50″S 131°7′52″E

Aircraft
- Aircraft type: Fokker F28 Fellowship
- Operator: Merpati Nusantara Airlines
- Registration: PK-GFU
- Flight origin: Pattimura Airport, Ambon, Maluku, Indonesia
- Destination: Jefman Airport, Sorong, Irian Jaya, Indonesia
- Occupants: 43
- Passengers: 39
- Crew: 4
- Fatalities: 41
- Injuries: 2
- Survivors: 2

Merpati Nusantara Airlines Flight 724 (MZ724/MNA724) was a scheduled domestic passenger flight operated by Merpati Nusantara Airlines from Pattimura Airport in Maluku's provincial capital Ambon to Jefman Airport in Sorong, Irian Jaya (currently West Papua); both in Indonesia. On 1 July 1993, the aircraft operating the flight, a Fokker F28 Fellowship 3000 registered as PK-GFU, crashed into the sea after it struck a small hill near Jefman Airport. 41 of the 43 people on board were killed in the crash.

Investigators concluded that the pilot of the aircraft unintentionally flew into high terrain. Subsequent damage caused the aircraft to crash into the sea off Jefman Airport.

== Accident ==
On 1 July 1993, the Fokker F28 Fellowship was approaching Jefman Airport at a relatively low height. Survivors recalled that the distance between the ground and the aircraft was less than one metre. The aircraft suddenly climbed then the left landing gear struck the summit of a small hill. Survivors stated that there was a loud bang when it happened.

Some passengers were thrown from their seats inside the aircraft. Parts of the wing detached, and the aircraft began to spin. The aircraft then overran the airport and crashed into the sea, breaking into three main sections. Most of the victims were found still strapped to their seats and several bodies floated to the surface. Search and rescue units were deployed immediately after the crash. Local fishermen arrived first on the crash site and helped a young boy and a man from the site. Several people survived the crash, but some died from their injuries. A man survived the crash and saved an unconscious boy from the water. While handing the boy over to a local fisherman, he suddenly became unconscious and later died.

News of the crash began to break at 3:00pm - 4:00pm. Relatives of the victims were informed about the crash and were transported to the crash site. They arrived the following day. The evacuation process was relatively quick, as the crash site was easily accessible.

== Aircraft ==
The aircraft involved in the crash was a Fokker F28 Fellowship 3000 registered as PK-GFU with a serial number of 11131. The aircraft had its first flight in April 1978. It was delivered the same year and after service with Garuda Indonesia it was sold to Merpati Nusantara Airlines in 1989.

== Investigation ==
Weather conditions were reported as bad at the time of the crash. Eyewitnesses stated that heavy rain was accompanied by strong wind. Merpati spokesman also stated that the weather in and around Sorong was "inclement", including the area of Jefman Airport. Thick black clouds could be seen at the time of the crash. Reports revealed that air traffic controllers had warned the crew of Flight 724 to abort their landing attempt and divert to Biak Airport. However, the pilot of Flight 724 insisted on landing at Jefman Airport.

When the pilot started the descent the aircraft turned towards the sea instead of the runway. The pilot seemed to be disoriented due to the inclement weather conditions. Seconds later, the crew realized their mistakes and executed a climb, but failed. The front part of the aircraft did manage to avoid the hill, however the rear part of the aircraft hit it. The aircraft then broke into three sections and crashed into the sea.

== See also ==
- Merpati Nusantara Airlines Flight 8968
- TransAsia Airways Flight 222
