= Travira Air =

Indonesian airline

IATA	ICAO	Call sign
TR	TVV	PARAMITA
- Founded: 1983; 43 years ago
- Hubs: Halim Perdanakusuma International Airport
- Fleet size: 16
- Destinations: Charter
- Headquarters: Jakarta
- Website: travira-air.com

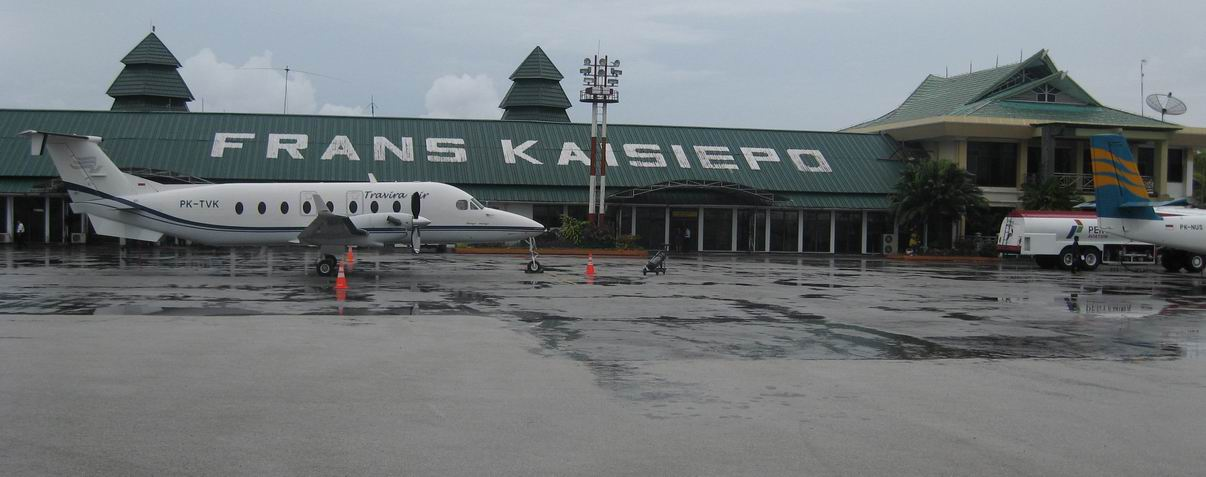
Travira Air Beechcraft 1900 at Frans Kaisiepo Airport

Travira Air (IATA: TR) is an airline based in Jakarta, Indonesia. It operates charter flights between Indonesian cities and other Asian countries. It is a midsize operator.

Travira's aircraft are used for long-term deals with major mineral companies, including LNG Tangguh, West Natuna Consortium, and mining companies in Sumbawa and East Kalimantan. Travira Air is listed in category 1 by Indonesian Civil Aviation Authority for airline safety quality.

Travira Air use the ATR 72 to operate charter flight between Halim-Matak route for mineral companies. Their Viking DHC6-400 Amphibian and Cessna 208 Amphibian operates charter flights between Denpasar-Benete route for a mining company in West Sumbawa.

== Destinations ==
As of 2025, Travira Air serves charter flights to other cities in Kalimantan and Papua.

Jakarta

- Matak

Biak

- Sorong
- Manokwari
- Babo

=== Terminated destinations ===
- Ambon

== Fleet ==
The Travira Air fleet includes the following aircraft (as of July 2023):

Travira Air fleet
Aircraft	In Service	Orders	Passengers	Notes
ATR 42-600	1	—		(as of July 2026)
ATR 72-600	2	—		(as of July 2026)
Beechcraft 1900D	1	—		(as of July 2026)
De Havilland Canada DHC-6 Twin Otter	1	—		(as of July 2026)
Beechcraft King Air 300	1	—		
Cessna 208B Grand Caravan Amphibian	1	—		
Gulfstream G450	2	—		
Agusta-Westland AW139	3	—		
Agusta-Westland AW169	1	—		
Sikorsky S-76	3	—		
Airbus Helicopters H145	1	—		
Bell 412	1	—		
Total	18	—		

The Travira Air fleet previously included the following aircraft (as of January 2015):

- 3 Cessna 208 Caravan
