= Halim Perdanakusuma International Airport =

Military and secondary commercial airport serving Jakarta, Indonesia

Halim Perdanakusuma International Airport Bandar Udara Internasional Halim Perdanakusuma
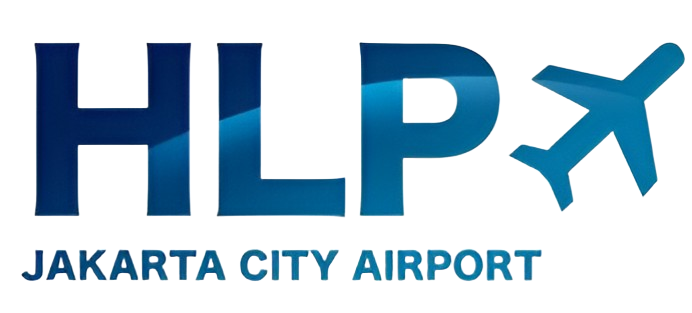

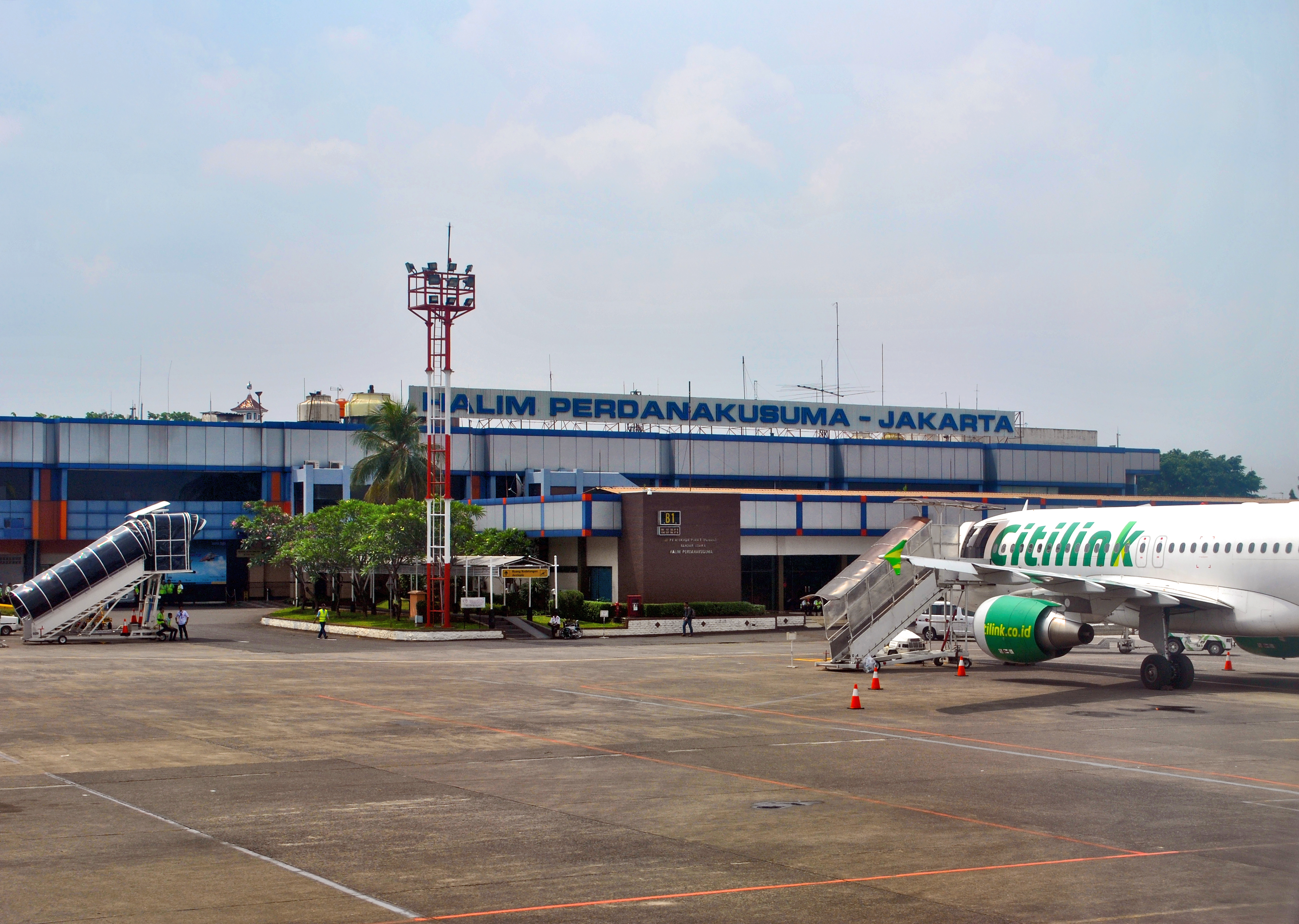
- IATA: HLP; ICAO: WIHH

Summary
- Airport type: Public / Military
- Owner: Indonesian Air Force
- Operator: InJourney Airports
- Serves: Jakarta metropolitan area
- Location: East Jakarta, Jakarta, Indonesia
- Opened: 1924; 102 years ago
- Hub for: Batik Air
- Operating base for: Citilink; Susi Air
- Time zone: WIB (UTC+07:00)
- Elevation AMSL: 82 ft (25 m)
- Coordinates: 06°15′59″S 106°53′28″E
- Website: halimperdanakusuma-airport.co.id

Map
- Location within Jakarta, Indonesia HLP/WIHH (Java) HLP/WIHH (Indonesia) HLP/WIHH (Southeast Asia)

Runways
Direction	Length		Surface
Direction	m	ft	Surface
06/24	3,000	9,843	Asphalt

Statistics (2024)
- Passengers: 3,430,093 (▼9.5%)
- Cargo (tonnes): 55,134 (▲16.8%)
- Aircraft movements: 40,929 (▼7.7%)
- Source: DGCA

Halim Perdanakusuma International Airport (IATA: HLP, ICAO: WIHH) is an international airport serving Jakarta, the capital city of Indonesia. The airport is named after Halim Perdanakusuma (1922–1947), an Indonesian Air Force officer and a recognized national hero of Indonesia. Located in East Jakarta near the border with Bekasi, West Java, the airport lies approximately 12 kilometers (7.5 miles) from Jakarta’s city center. It serves as the city’s secondary airport, complementing the larger Soekarno–Hatta International Airport in Tangerang. Although designated as an international airport, Halim Perdanakusuma International Airport primarily handles domestic flights, with international flights mostly limited to cargo and non-commercial flights. It functions as a secondary hub for airlines such as Batik Air and Citilink, providing connections to several major Indonesian cities including Surabaya, Denpasar, Padang, and Pekanbaru. In addition, the airport also accommodates charter flights, VIP operations, and other non-commercial aviation services.

While the civilian facilities are operated by InJourney Airports, the land remains fully owned by the Indonesian Air Force. The airport shares its facilities with Halim Perdanakusuma Air Force Base, a Type A base of the Indonesian Air Force and one of the largest air force installations in Indonesia. The air force base hosts several squadrons of the Indonesian Air Force and also serves as the headquarters for multiple air force units.

== History ==
=== Colonial era ===
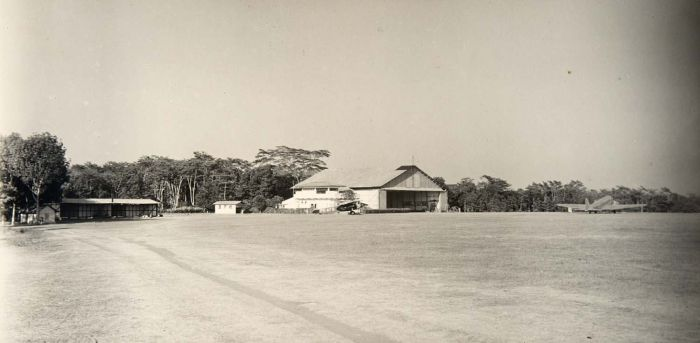
The old Tjililitan airfield in 1925–1935

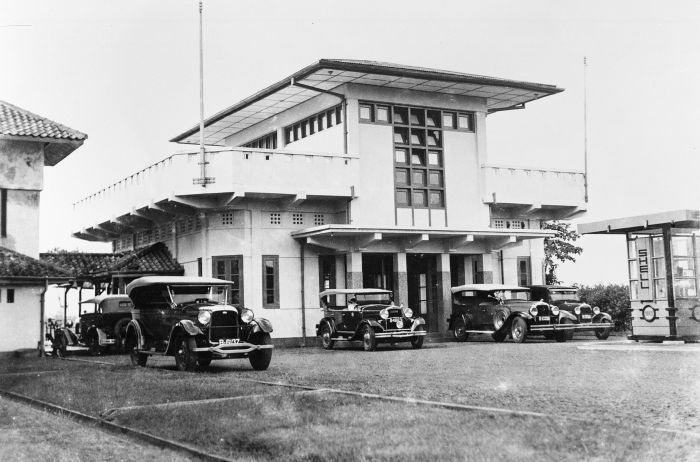
Arrival hall at Tjililitan Airfield, c. 1915–1925

Formerly, the area in Tjililitan where Halim Perdanakusuma Airport is now located was owned by a Dutchman named Pieter van der Velde. The estate, known as Tandjoeng Ost, was originally used as a rubber plantation. Part of the plantation was later transferred to the government of the Dutch East Indies for the construction of an airfield.

Halim Perdanakusuma Airport is the first airfield in the city of Jakarta, which was formerly known as Batavia. It was built around 1924 and was originally named Tjililitan Airfield (Dutch: Vliegveld Tjililitan), after its borough. On November 1, 1928, Tjililitan airfield began operations under a Dutch airline in the Dutch East Indies, the Koninklijke Nederlandsch-Indische Luchtvaart Maatschappij (KNILM), which served routes from Batavia to Bandung, as well as from Batavia to Semarang and Surabaya. A year later, the name Tjililitan Air Base gained international recognition after the Dutch airline KLM set a record for intercontinental flight using a Fokker F.VII aircraft. The flight covered a distance of 14,500 km from the Netherlands to Batavia in 10 days, carrying only four passengers. In addition to its role as a civilian airfield, it also served as a base for the Royal Netherlands East Indies Army Air Force (ML-KNIL). When the Pacific Theater of World War II broke out in 1941, the airfield became home to Air Group III (vliegtuiggroep), which consisted of three divisions (afdelingen). Each division was equipped with nine Martin B-10 bombers, plus two additional aircraft held in reserve as spares. In preparation for the Japanese attack on the Dutch East Indies, the airfield was expanded to accommodate additional military aircraft.

On 25 February 1942, the Imperial Japanese Navy Air Service launched an air raid on Batavia, with Tjililitan Airfield as one of its targets. At the time, eight Hawker Hurricanes from No. 605 Squadron RAuxAF and No. 242 Squadron RAF were stationed at the airfield to defend the city. On the ground, the airfield was protected by units of the British Army and the Royal Netherlands East Indies Army (KNIL). Elements of the KNIL’s A. I Ld. section and the British Army’s 242 Battery (48th Light Anti-Aircraft Regiment) operated a combined anti-aircraft defence consisting of two 2 cm and eight 4 cm guns. During the attack, they engaged approximately eight Japanese aircraft (likely a mix of Navy fighters and a C5M reconnaissance aircraft) that were involved in the raid. In addition, British troops used Bren guns to fire at low-flying aircraft conducting strafing runs against anti-aircraft positions along the airfield perimeter. According to reports, two Japanese fighters were hit by fire from 242 Battery personnel. One British soldier, firing from a trench with his rifle, was struck in the head by machine-gun fire and killed, becoming the only recorded casualty of the attack. Eventually, the aircraft were withdrawn to Bandung after Batavia was declared an open city. Despite initially fierce resistance, the airfield was soon overrun by Japanese forces.

During the Japanese occupation (1942–1945), the airfield was seized by the Imperial Japanese Army Air Service and repurposed as a military base. Numerous Japanese aircraft, particularly Mitsubishi A6M Zero fighters, operated from Tjililitan in support of Pacific War operations against Allied forces.

After Japan’s surrender in 1945, control of the airfield was transferred back to returning Dutch authorities, who subsequently rebuilt and reactivated it. The airfield then reverted to its original function as a base for the ML-KNIL throughout the Indonesian National Revolution. During this period, it served as a staging area for Dutch military operations against Indonesian forces, including Operation Kraai. Between 1946 and 1948, the airfield has been associated in some historical accounts with incidents of extrajudicial violence, in which elements of indigenous KNIL units were reportedly involved in the killing of civilians in the surrounding area, allegedly under orders from their Dutch superiors.

=== Post-independence era ===
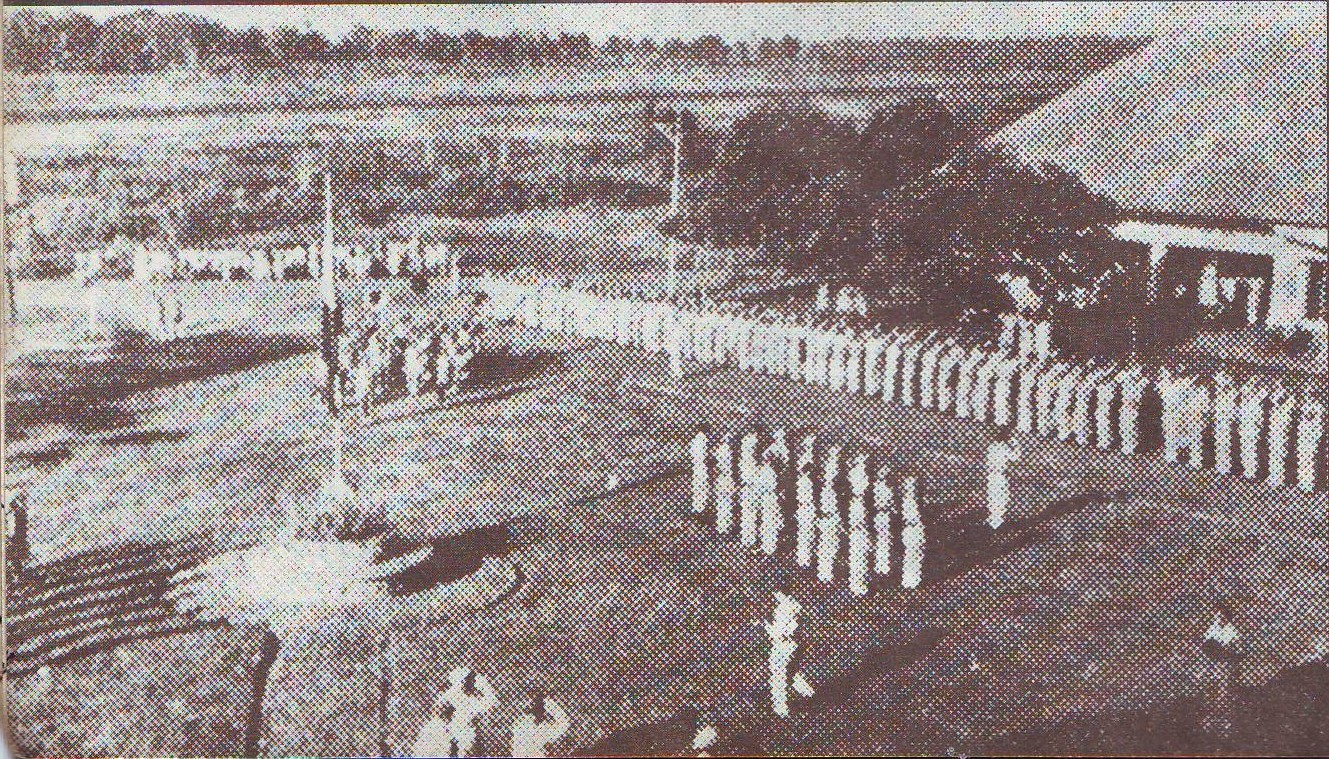
The transfer ceremony of Tjililitan Airfield to the Indonesian Air Force, 20 June 1950

On June 20, 1950, the Netherlands officially handed over the air base to the Indonesian government. It was subsequently taken over by the Indonesian Air Force (AURI) and designated as a military air base under the 1st Air Force Operations Command. Several facilities were transferred to the Air Force Chief of Staff at the time, Soerjadi Soerjadarma, including buildings, hangars, offices, warehouses, housing, and a hospital, along with two air squadrons—20th Squadron and 18th Bomber Squadron. Three former ML-KNIL hangars were repurposed to house 17th Air Squadron, 31st Air Squadron, and 21st Technical Squadron. On August 17, 1952, Tjililitan Air Base was officially renamed Halim Perdanakusuma Air Base in honor of Abdul Halim Perdanakusuma, an Indonesian Air Force officer and airman who died in the line of duty during the Indonesian National Revolution and was later recognized as a national hero of Indonesia.

Throughout the 1950s and 1960s, the airfield continued to serve as a base of the Indonesian Air Force. It hosted several squadrons, including the 2nd Squadron, which at the time operated C-47 Dakota aircraft and participated in Operation Trikora, Indonesia’s joint military campaign in the early 1960s aimed at integrating Dutch-controlled Western New Guinea into the Republic of Indonesia.

During the 30 September Incident of 1965, Halim Air Base served as the central base for the coup plotters of the 30 September Movement. Members of the Tjakrabirawa Regiment assembled there prior to launching the coup, reportedly with the support of the Indonesian Air Force. The bodies of seven Indonesian Army officers were discarded by the plotters in Lubang Buaya, situated just south of the airbase. After the failed coup attempt, President Sukarno sought refuge at Halim Air Base before fleeing to Bogor for safety. In the early hours of 2 October 1965, Indonesian Army forces, including units from Kostrad and RPKAD, launched an assault on the airbase. After a brief skirmish with rebel troops, the Army successfully secured the airbase. Subsequently, the Army blockaded the runway, preventing Indonesian Air Force aircraft from landing. As a result, many of these aircraft were diverted to Atang Senjaya Air Base in Bogor.

=== Contemporary history ===
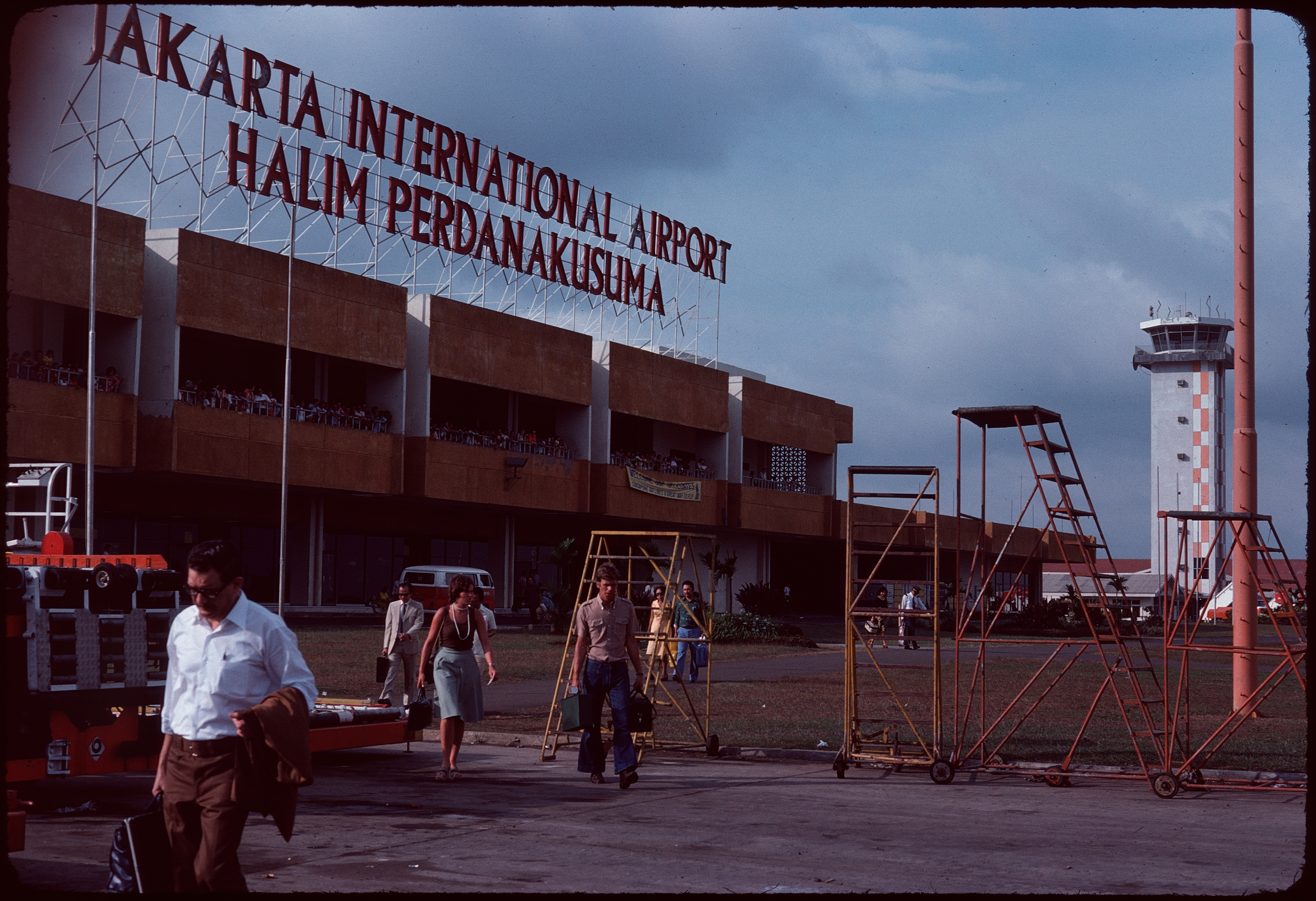
Halim Perdanakusuma International Airport in 1975

In addition to serving as a military airbase, the airport began handling international flights in 1974, easing the burden on the busy Kemayoran Airport. At that time, all international flights were relocated to Halim Perdanakusuma International Airport, while Kemayoran continued to serve only domestic flights. Halim Perdanakusuma International Airport remained a vital gateway for international travel to Jakarta until the opening of Soekarno–Hatta International Airport in Tangerang in 1985. Following the closure of Kemayoran in 1985, Halim Perdanakusuma became Jakarta's secondary airport, primarily accommodating charter flights, general aviation, and serving as a base for flying schools for the next 29 years. In the 1990s, the Directorate General of Civil Aviation designated Halim as a hub for non-scheduled flights and scheduled services using aircraft with a capacity of fewer than 100 passengers.

In 2013, to ease congestion at Soekarno–Hatta Airport, the Halim airport authority announced that it would give 60 flight slots per hour for scheduled flights and, for the first time, the 2013 Haj pilgrims used this airport. Batik Air initially was the largest user, taking 32 slots from 74 slots available for all airlines a day. Since 2014, the airport has served domestic scheduled flights with a capacity up to 2.2 million passengers per year from about 200,000 passengers in 2013.

In early November 2021, Indonesia's Ministry of Transportation announced they would close the airport temporarily for public use for the next nine months for renovation. Domestic flights would be moved to Soekarno–Hatta International Airport or Pondok Cabe Airport. This decision was made based on the evaluation of Halim's aging infrastructure, like the runways and terminals, and the impact to the airport's quality of services. The airport was closed from March to September 2022 to allow for renovation works.

Conflict frequently arose between Angkasa Pura, which operates the airport's commercial area, including the passenger terminal, and the Indonesian Air Force, which owns the land. In July 2022, the Indonesian Air Force attempted to evict Angkasa Pura from the 21-hectare commercial area it managed. Following intervention by the Directorate General of Civil Aviation under the Ministry of Transportation, which affirmed that Angkasa Pura was the legitimate manager of the airport's commercial area, Angkasa Pura cancelled its planned withdrawal from the airport. The Indonesian Air Force subsequently rescinded the eviction order.

== Facilities and development ==
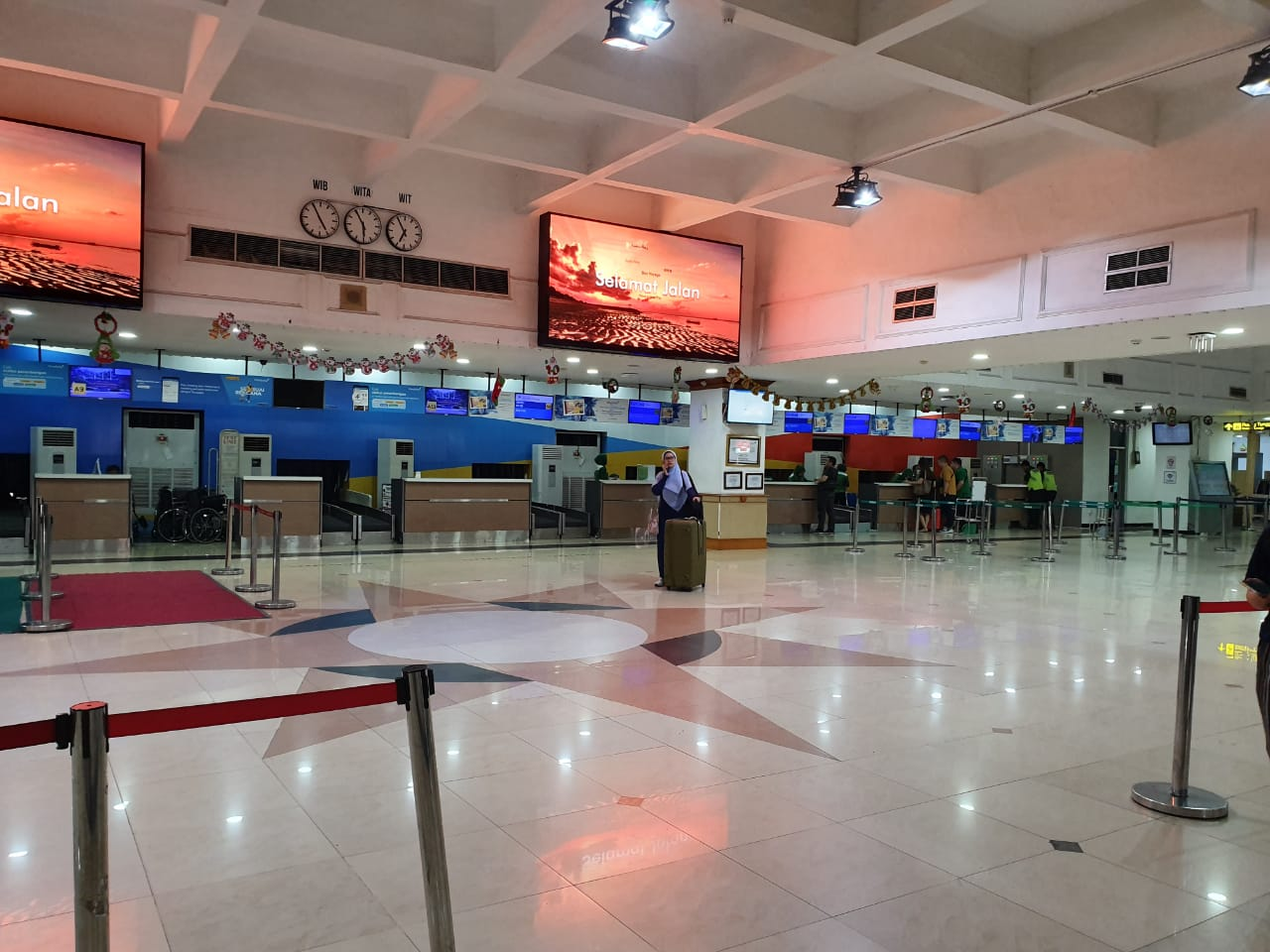
Check-in counters

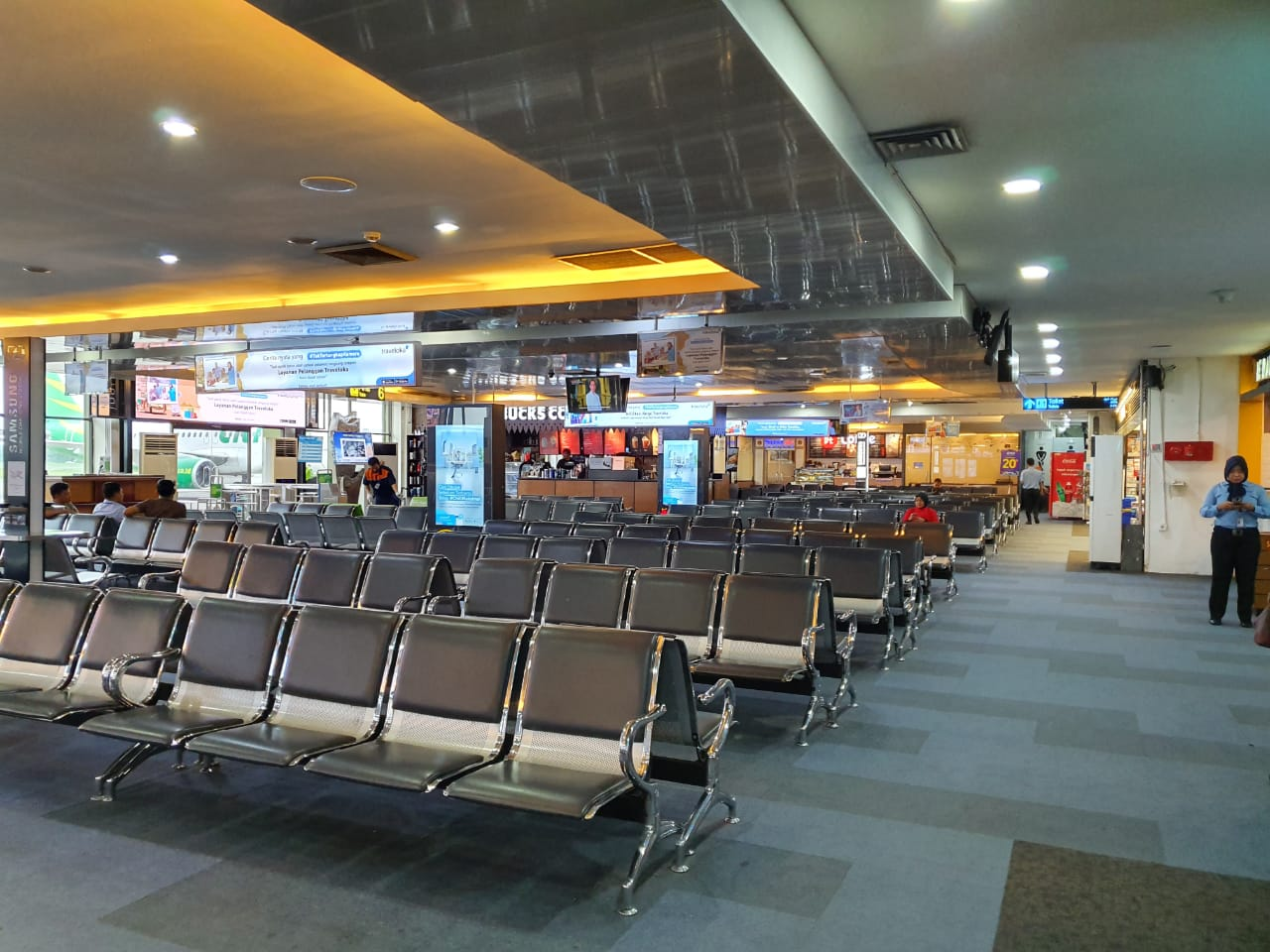
Boarding gates

=== Facilities ===
Halim Perdanakusuma International Airport has a single runway measuring 3,000 meters in length and 45 meters in width, supported by five taxiways, each measuring 150 meters by 30 meters. The airport is equipped with two aprons: a northern apron measuring 711 meters by 125 meters, and a southern apron measuring 470 meters by 135 meters. The runway is oriented 06/24 and features a hot mix asphalt surface with a Pavement Classification Number (PCN) of 86 F/C/X/U. The airport is currently capable of accommodating wide-body aircraft such as the Boeing 747 and the Boeing 777.

Before the airport resumed commercial operations after decades of inactivity, the passenger terminal and supporting infrastructure were renovated in 2013. The upgrades included the construction of ticket counters, reorganization of the parking area, and expansion of the boarding gate, which is capable of accommodating up to three flights or 600 passengers per hour. Additional improvements were made to facilities such as the check-in area entrance, surveillance cameras (CCTV), fire alarm systems, and flight information displays. On the airside, the apron is capable of accommodating up to 14 Boeing 737-400 aircraft.

=== Development ===
A major redevelopment of the airport was carried out between March and September 2022, involving extensive upgrades to both the airside and landside facilities. During the renovation period, the airport was temporarily closed to all flights. The total cost of the upgrade amounted to approximately 500 billion rupiah. On the airside, works included the rehabilitation of the runway, taxiways, and aircraft apron. On the landside, the project focused on revitalizing the drainage system, the Naratetama VVIP Terminal, the Naratama VIP Terminal, the passenger terminal, and various supporting infrastructure.

The apron was expanded to accommodate up to 16 narrow-body aircraft—such as the Boeing 737 and Airbus A320—or six wide-body aircraft. The arrival terminal was also enlarged by 30 percent, increasing from 819.32 to 1,194.24 square meters. Additionally, the number of baggage conveyor belts was increased from two to three units to improve handling capacity. Following the renovation, the passenger terminal's capacity increased to accommodate 7-8 million passengers annually, up from its original capacity of only 2 million passengers. One of the most notable transformations took place at the Naratetama VVIP Terminal. Previously in a state of disrepair, the terminal now resembles a five-star hotel, shedding its former worn-out appearance. Located at the front section of the airport in East Jakarta, it now features dedicated rooms for the president, vice president, and visiting state guests. The presidential meeting room has also been expanded and fitted with higher ceilings, offering a more spacious and distinguished atmosphere.

In July 2026, it was announced that the airport's taxiway system would be reorganized and upgraded, including the possibility of constructing a new taxiway, to improve the efficiency of aircraft taxiing, takeoffs, and landings. The project is expected to reduce aircraft operational waiting times by approximately 20–30 minutes, thereby improving overall airport efficiency. Funding for the project is expected to be allocated through the 2027 state budget (APBN).

== Airlines and destinations ==
=== Passenger ===
Airlines	Destinations
Batik Air	Denpasar, Malang, Palembang, Surabaya
Citilink	Denpasar, Medan, Padang, Pekanbaru, Surabaya, Yogyakarta–Adisucipto
FlyJaya	Ketapang, Jember, Yogyakarta–Adisucipto
Pelita Air	Charter: Matak
Susi Air	Bandung–Husein Sastranegara, Pangandaran (Note: Pangandaran is continuation of Bandung–Sastranegara flight as the same flight number)

=== Cargo ===
Airlines	Destinations
Cardig Air	Balikpapan, Makassar, Pekanbaru

== Statistics ==
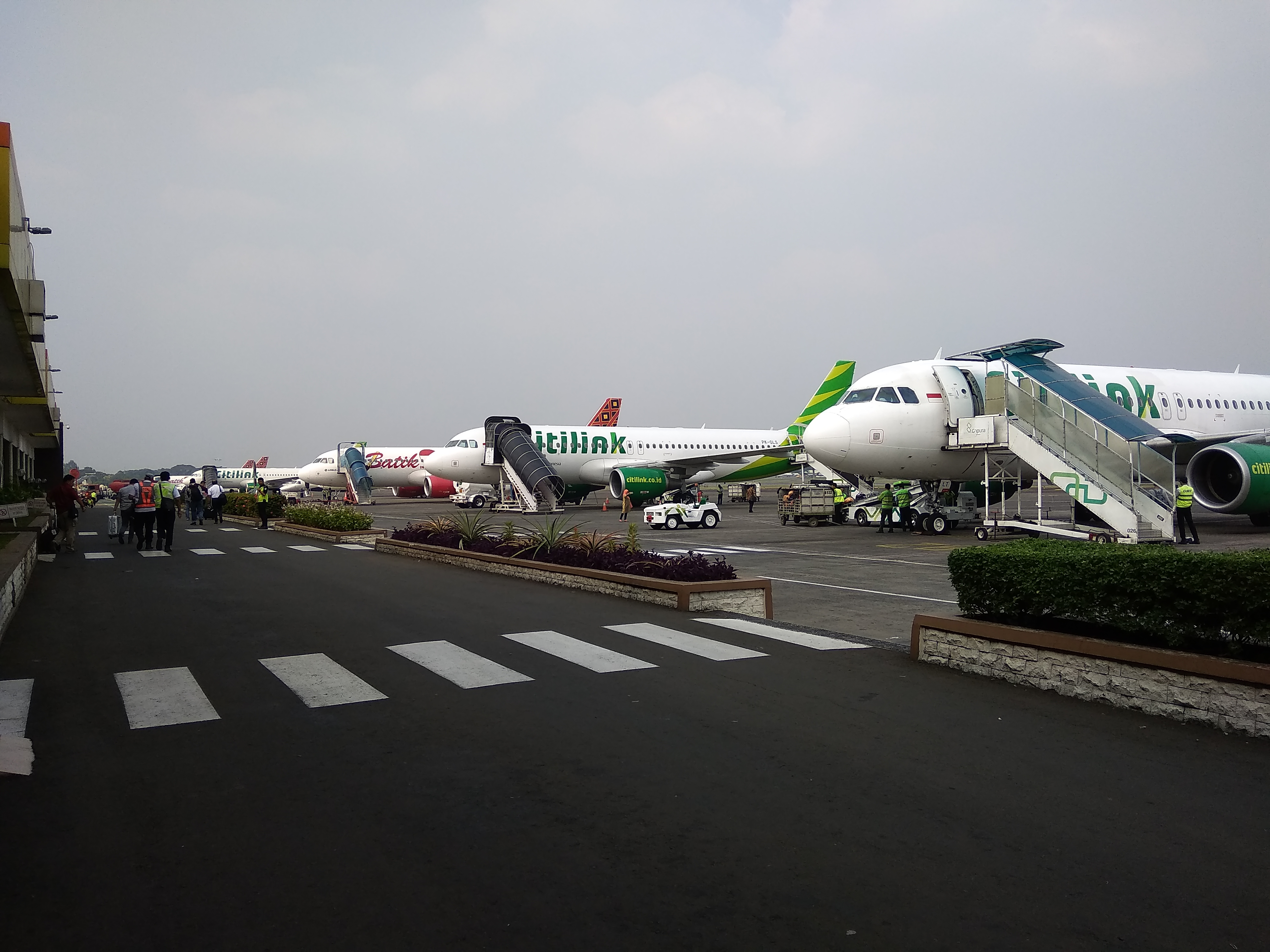
Batik Air and Citilink aircraft, the two primary airlines operating at Halim Perdanakusuma International Airport, lined up on the apron.

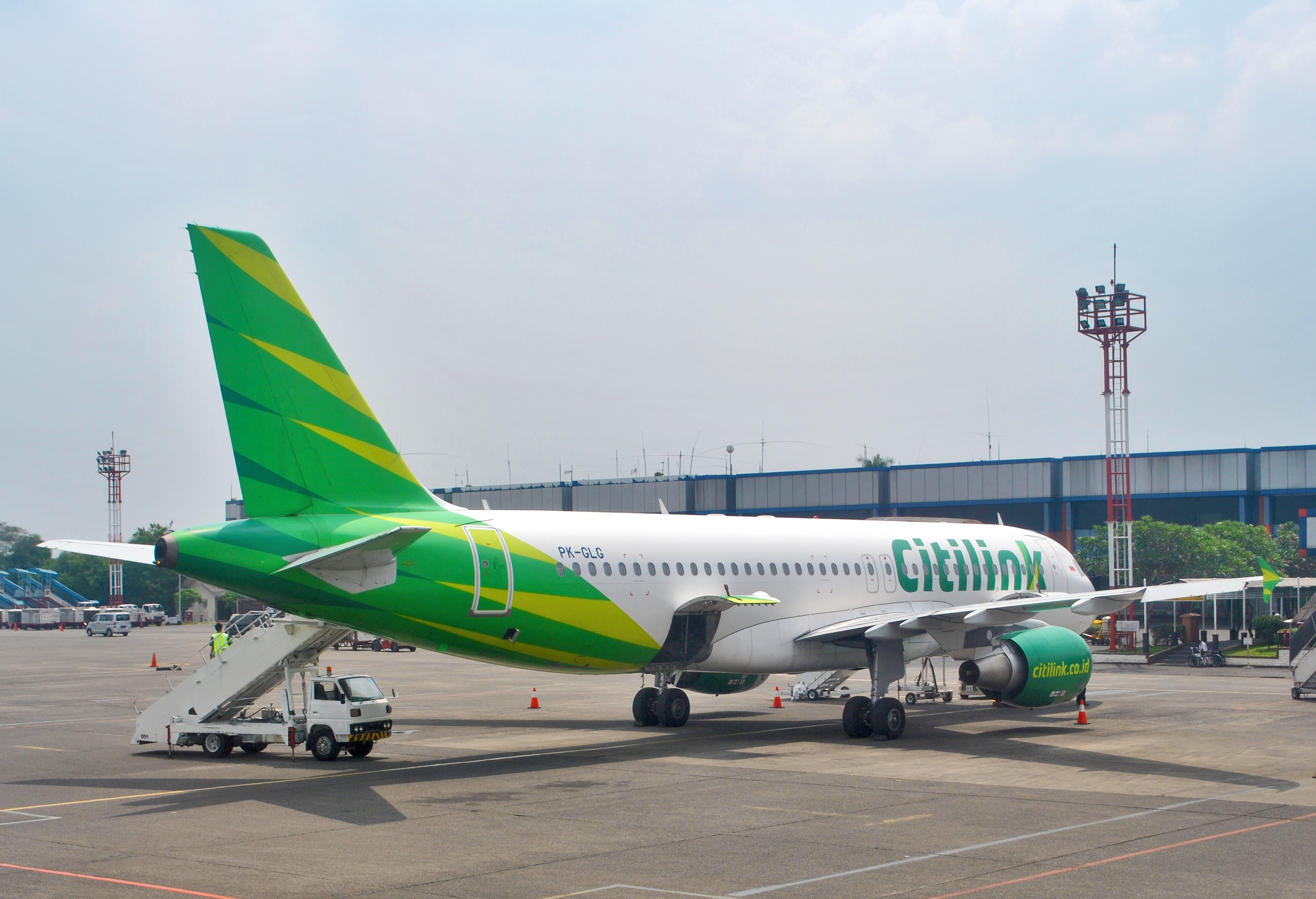
A Citilink Airbus A320-200 on standby at Halim Perdanakusuma International Airport

Annual passenger numbers and aircraft statistics
Year	Passengers handled	Passenger % change	Cargo (tonnes)	Cargo % change	Aircraft movements	Aircraft % change
2006	227,769	Steady	6,682	Steady	21,015	Steady
2007	167,781	▼26.3	3,720	▼44.3	16,949	▼19.3
2008	133,204	▼20.6	4,285	▲15.2	4,346	▼74.4
2009	190,183	▲42.8	1,332	▼68.9	17,449	▲301.5
2010	216,210	▲13.7	243	▼81.8	19,888	▲14.0
2011	75,026	▼65.3	208	▼14.4	23,250	▲16.9
2012	168,190	▲124.2	289	▲138.9	26,417	▲13.6
2013	210,815	▲25.3	1,129	▲1290.7	28,432	▲7.6
2014	1,646,862	▲681.2	12,793	▲11033.1	29,108	▲2.4
2015	3,059,153	▲85.8	8,435	▼34.1	30,235	▲3.9
2016	5,613,039	▲83.5	13,608	▲161.3	55,739	▲84.4
2017	6,912,445	▲23.1	25,395	▲186.6	67,390	▲20.9
2018	7,446,483	▲7.7	34,381	▲135.4	66,798	▼0.9
2019	6,209,195	▼16.6	31,902	▼7.2	62,047	▼7.1
2020	2,014,089	▼67.6	46,746	▲46.5	35,252	▼43.2
2021	1,432,366	▼28.9	80,149	▲171.5	34,648	▼1.7
2022	1,002,500	▼30.0	21,986	▼72.6	16,211	▼53.2
2023	3,791,108	▲278.2	47,206	▲114.7	44,327	▲173.4
2024	3,430,093	▼9.5	55,134	▲16.8	40,929	▼7.7
^{Source: DGCA, BPS}

== Halim Perdanakusuma Air Force Base ==
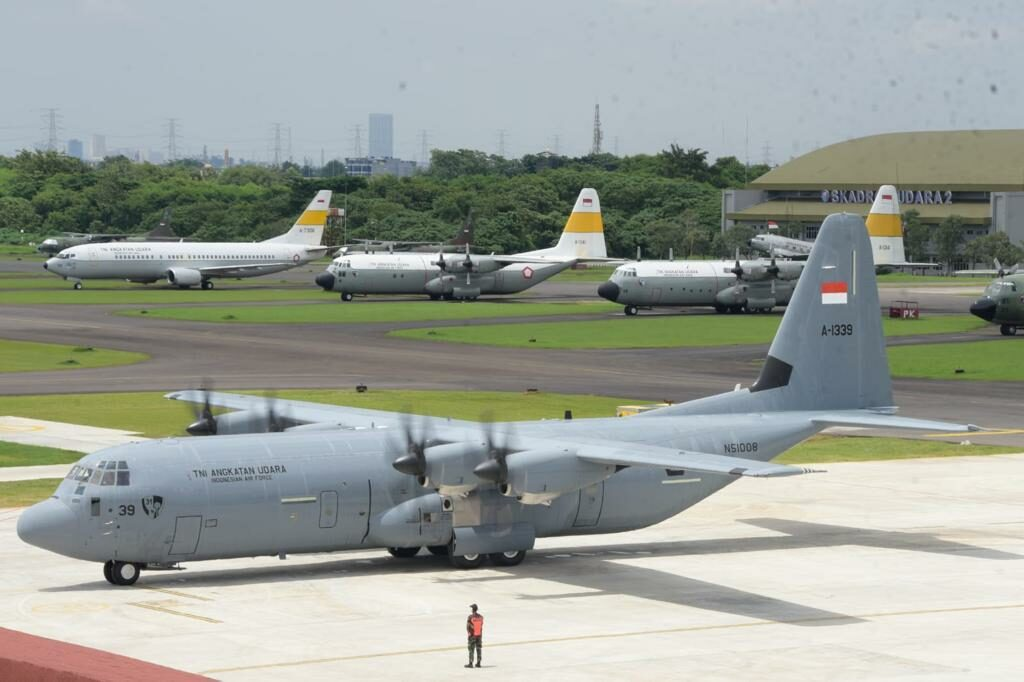
Indonesian Air Force aircraft lining up at Halim Perdanakusuma Air Force Base

In addition to handling commercial flights, the airport shares its airfield with Halim Perdanakusuma Air Force Base, a key Type A facility of the Indonesian Air Force. Operating under the 1st Air Force Operations Command (Komando Operasi Angkatan Udara I), the base plays a critical role in overseeing the western sector of Indonesia’s airspace. It also serves as the headquarters of both the National Air Operations Command and the 1st Air Force Operations Command. Halim Perdanakusuma Air Force Base is regarded as one of the most comprehensive air bases in Indonesia. It hosts several operational units, including three air squadrons and one engineering squadron, as listed below:

- 2nd Transport Air Squadron – operates the CASA CN-295 MPA aircraft.
- 17th VIP Air Squadron – operates the Dassault Falcon 7X and Boeing 737NG aircraft.
- 31st Heavy Transport Squadron – operates the C-130J Super Hercules, C-130H/HS, L-100-30, and Airbus A400M/MRTT.
- 45th VIP Air Squadron – operates the Eurocopter AS332 Super Puma helicopter.

In addition, the airbase also serve as the headquarter of mere than 20 supporting units of the Indonesian National Armed Forces and the Indonesian Air Force. These include Air Force Operation Command I (Makoopsau I), the Air Force Doctrine, Education and Training Development Command (Makodikau), the National Air Operation Command (Makohanudnas), Air Defense Sector Command I (Makosek Hanudnas I), the Air Force Aerial Survey and Mapping Service (Dissurpotrudau), the Air Force Psychology Service (Dispsiau), and the Dr. Esnawan Antariksa Air Force Central Hospital (Ruspau).

The 17th Air Squadron provides dedicated aircraft for transporting high-ranking state officials, including the President and Vice President. Meanwhile, the 31st Air Squadron, which operates Lockheed C-130 Hercules aircraft, supports troop transport operations, reinforcing the base’s role as a primary deployment hub for military forces and national security personnel. In line with this function, the Commander of Wing I at Halim Perdanakusuma Air Force Base also serves as the Air Task Force Commander of the Rapid Reaction Strike Force (Pasukan Pemukul Reaksi Cepat, PPRC).

== Ground transportation ==
=== Bus ===
DAMRI buses operate from the airport, providing connections to nearby cities such as Bogor and Bekasi. For travel within Jakarta, the airport is accessible via the Gereja Oikumene stop on the JakLingko JAK20 corridor, located just a three-minute walk from the airport terminal.

=== Taxis ===
Within the airport terminal, only official taxis authorized by the Indonesian Air Force authority in Halim Perdanakusuma Airport are permitted to operate. This policy has sparked some controversy, as these taxis are often considered overpriced by passengers. However, outside the terminal, travelers can easily find alternative options such as Bluebird taxis and app-based ride-hailing services like Gojek, Grab, and Maxim.

=== Rail ===
The airport is located near the Halim railway station complex, which includes stations for both the Jakarta–Bandung high-speed railway operated by Kereta Cepat Indonesia China (KCIC) and the Jabodebek LRT Bekasi Line. An airport shuttle bus is available to provide convenient transportation between the airport and the station complex.

An express train service is now under planning stage to connect Soekarno–Hatta International Airport with Halim Perdanakusuma Airport. Completion of this line is originally expected to be completed at the very earliest in 2019. At first this project was solely planned to be built as an 33-kilometer (21 mi) express line between Manggarai Station at South Jakarta and Soekarno–Hatta International Airport via Angke and Pluit, which would be a public–private partnership project. Later the route was extended from Manggarai to Halim Perdanakusuma Airport, which is in East Jakarta. The 33 kilometer project, proposed as Halim-Cawang-Manggarai-Tanah Abang-Sudirman-Pluit Terminal 2 and 3 SHIA stretch route, has been proposed to include a combination of surface-underground-elevated tracks. The express train is projected to take 30 minutes to connect the two main airports that serve the Greater Jakarta area.

== Accidents and incidents ==
- 24 June 1982: British Airways Flight 9, a Boeing 747-200 (registered G-BDXH) flew through a cloud of volcanic ash thrown up by the eruption of Mount Galunggung, causing the failure of all four engines. The crew diverted the aircraft to Jakarta and it landed safely.
- 9 May 2012: a Sukhoi Superjet 100 crashed into Mount Salak on a test flight, killing all 45 people on board. The investigation found that pilot error was to blame.
- 21 June 2012: An Indonesian Air Force Fokker F-27 crashed on landing and hit a housing complex near Halim airport.
- 4 April 2016: Batik Air Flight 7703, a Boeing 737-800 (registered PK-LBS) collided with a TransNusa ATR 42 while taxiing. The Boeing 737 wingtip sliced the tail of the ATR. The wingtip of the Boeing 737 burst into flames but was quickly extinguished. No one on board was killed.
