= Jefman Airport =

Former airport in Sorong, Southwest Papua, Indonesia (1947–2004)

Jefman Airport Bandar Udara Jefman
- IATA: ~~SOQ~~; ICAO: ~~WASS~~

Summary
- Airport type: Defunct
- Operator: Ministry of Transportation
- Serves: Sorong
- Location: North Salawati, Raja Ampat, Southwest Papua, Indonesia
- Opened: 16 March 1947
- Closed: 20 March 2004
- Elevation AMSL: 10 ft / 3 m
- Coordinates: 00°55′34″S 131°07′16″E

Map
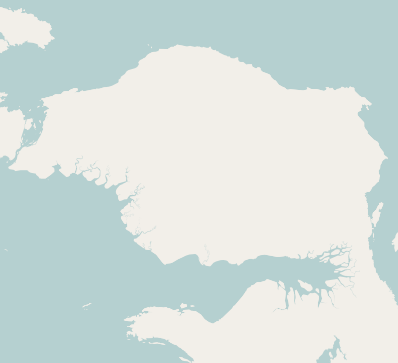
- Location in Bird's Head Peninsula Location in Western New Guinea

Runways
Direction	Length		Surface
Direction	m	ft	Surface
04/22	1,650	5,413	Asphalt (Closed)

Jefman Airport ~~(IATA: SOQ, ICAO: WASS)~~ was an airport in North Salawati, Raja Ampat Regency, Southwest Papua, Indonesia. It closed when the new Domine Eduard Osok Airport became operational.

== Former airlines and destinations ==
=== Passenger ===
Airlines	Destinations
Merpati Nusantara Airlines	Jayapura, Ambon, Manokwari, Fakfak, Biak, Makassar, Manado
