= Matak =

Island in Indonesia

Coordinates: 3°18′0″N 106°16′0″E

Location of Matak in Riau Islands Province

Matak (Indonesian: Pulau Matak) is an island in the Anambas Islands of Indonesia, located in the South China Sea between the Malay Peninsula and Borneo. The island is a base for oil companies including ConocoPhillips, Premier Oil and Star Energy, and is served by Matak Airport (MWK/WIOM). The population of Matak Island is estimated to be in the range of 1500–2500. Residents usually work for the oil companies located on the island. There are also factories on the island, such as Kosel Yamato.
