= Matak Airport =

Matak Airport Bandar Udara Matak
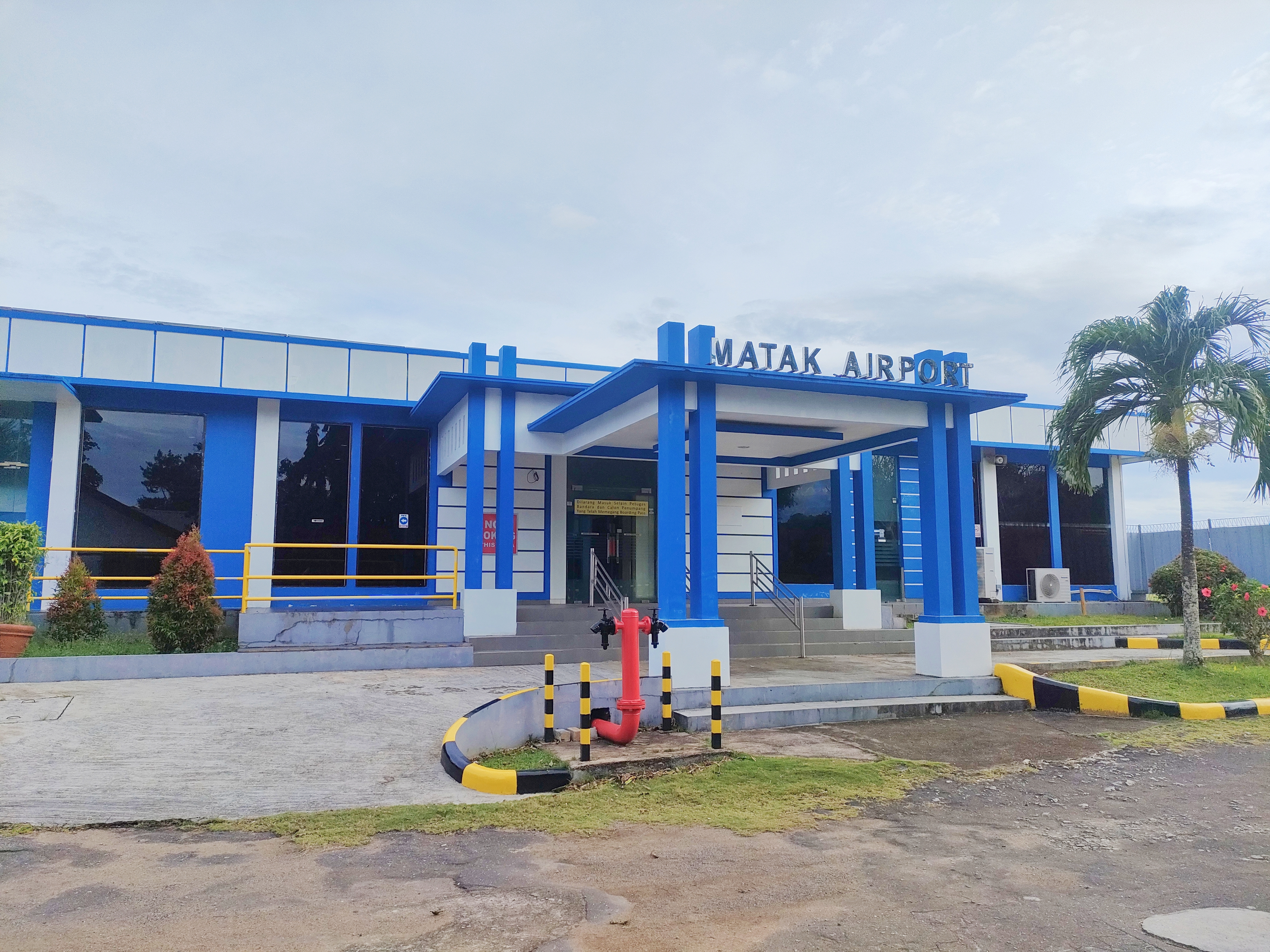
- IATA: MWK; ICAO: WIDM

Summary
- Airport type: Private/civil
- Owner: Private
- Operator: MedcoEnergi
- Serves: Anambas
- Location: Matak, Riau Islands, Indonesia
- Elevation AMSL: 10 ft (3.0 m)
- Coordinates: 03°20′53.23″N 106°15′28.98″E

Map
- Location in South China Sea Location in Riau Islands

Runways
Direction	Length		Surface
Direction	m	ft	Surface
18/36	1,190	3,904	Asphalt

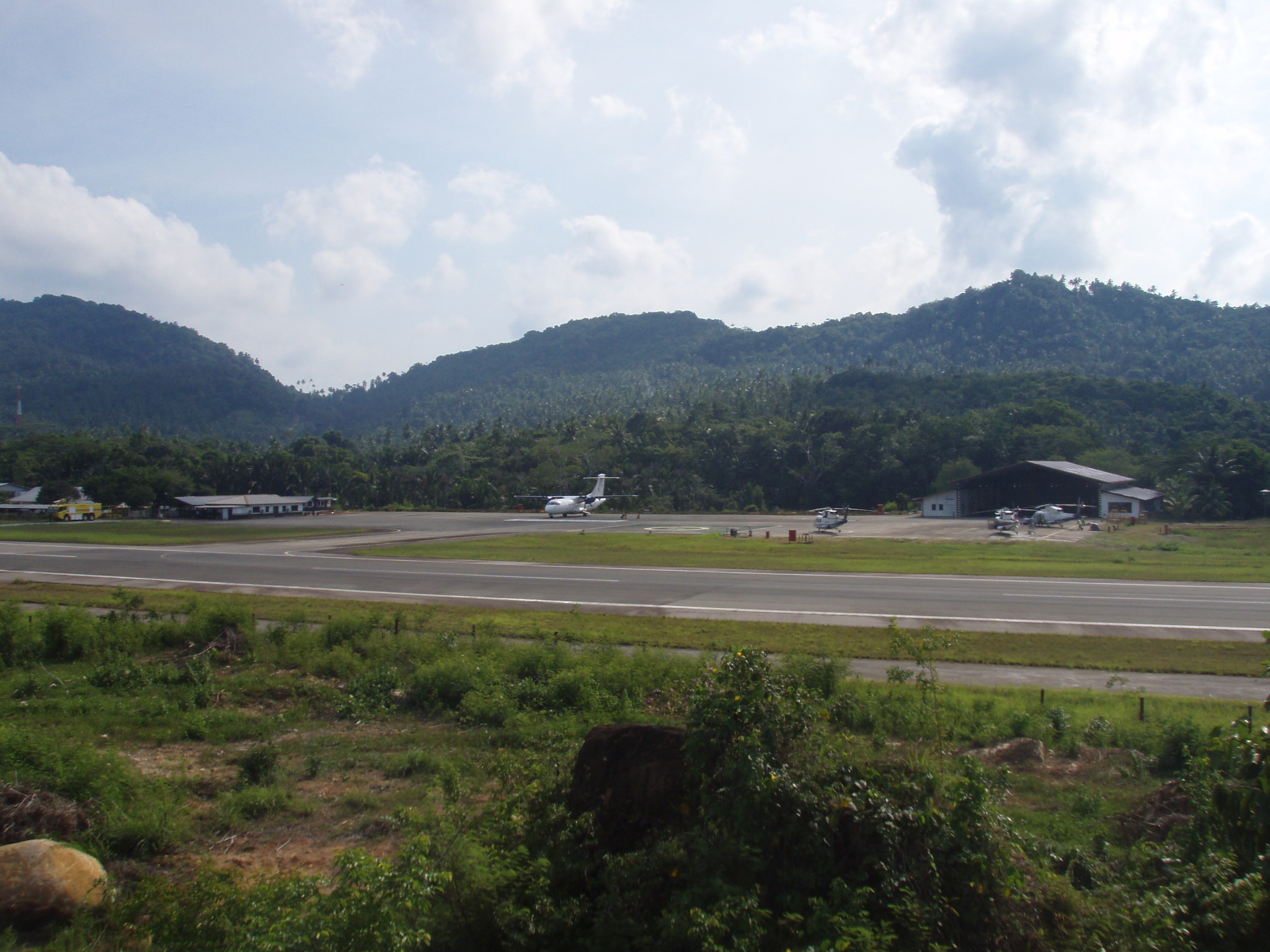
Matak Airport

Matak Airport is located on the island of Matak in the Anambas Islands on Riau Islands Province, Indonesia. It serves charter flights from and to Jakarta–Halim for MedcoEnergi, as well as commercial flights to and from Tanjung Pinang and Batam.

== Airlines and destinations ==
Airlines	Destinations
Travira Air	Charter: Jakarta-Halim Perdanakusuma

== Statistics ==
Frequency of flights at Matak Airport
Rank	Destinations	Frequency (weekly)	Airline(s)
1	Tanjung Pinang, Riau Islands	6	XpressAir
2	Batam, Riau Islands	3	XpressAir
