= Taxi Maxim =

Russian technology company

Maxim
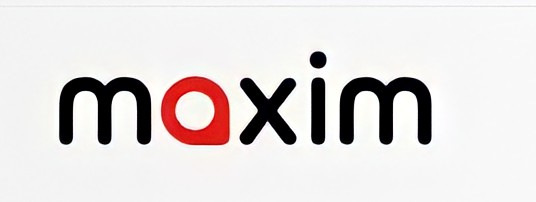
- Industry: Information technology Transportation
- Founded: 2003
- Website: taximaxim.com

Maxim is a global technology company that operates a taxi aggregation platform, having created a hardware-software system for connecting and processing an unlimited number of customers and contractors. It also develops food tech solutions, as well as software and technologies for shipping, freight transport, e-commerce, delivery, and other services.

== History ==
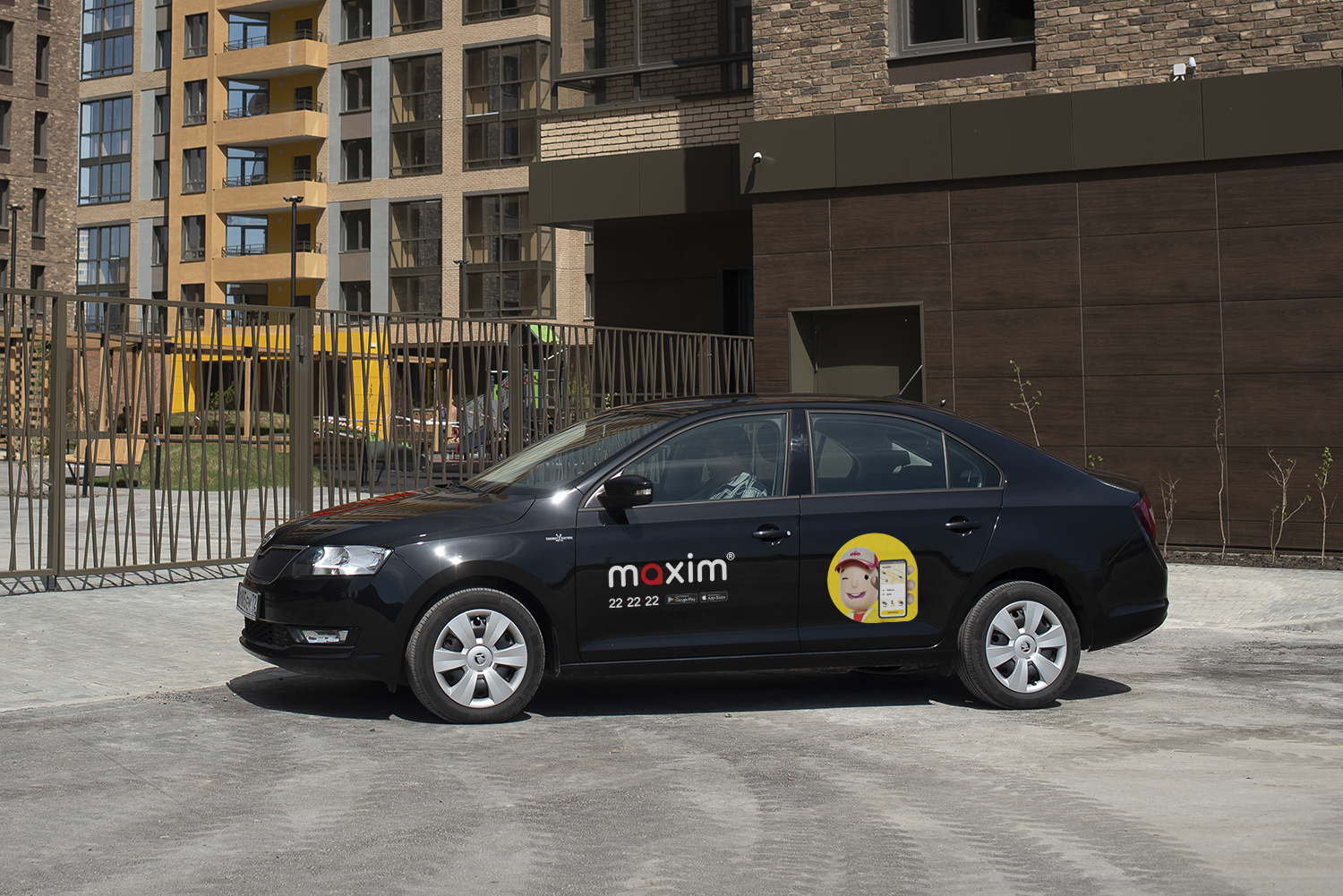
A Maxim car on a city street

In 2003, a specialized system called “Maxim” was developed to handle ride requests, dispatch drivers, and plan routes. In November 2004, the company launched its first full-scale dispatch system for taxi operators. In 2007, Taxi Maxim launched a mobile app for drivers: the Java ME version replaced radio communication with an automated status tracking system. In 2012, apps were developed for Android and iOS, and in 2013, for Windows Phone. In 2014, Maxim entered the international market. As of 2022, Maxim operates in more than a thousand cities in 18 countries worldwide.

== Architecture ==
- Modular software architecture with a decentralized management model.
- Support for ride-hailing, delivery, and other transportation services.
- Order acceptance via mobile applications
- Real-time automatic order assignment to drivers.
- Route planning and trip tracking.
- Integrated payment processing.
- Scalable architecture supporting business growth.
- Localization for different countries and regions.
- Integration of additional services and transport solutions.
- Configurable fares, service zones, vehicle categories, and business rules without modifying the source code.
- Analytics tools for monitoring operational performance.
- Driver performance evaluation.
- Service quality monitoring through rating systems, customer feedback, and incident management.

Passengers book rides through the Taxi Maxim app, while drivers and couriers use Taxsee Driver to accept orders and plan their work schedules.

== Regions ==
=== Southeast Asia ===
Maxim has been working in Indonesia since 2018. Users can order trips on a motorcycle, car, bentor, delivery and purchase of goods, cargo transportation and cleaning. In December 2020, a new massage and spa service was launched.

In December 2021, Maxim launched the charity fund Yayasan Pengemudi Selamat Sejahtera Indonesia (YPSSI) to provide financial support for passengers and drivers injured during rides. By 2024, the payments amounted to more than 6 billion rupiah for more 100 cases.

In December 2021, Maxim launched a marketplace integrated into the app. Users can order ready meals, food and other goods from partners directly.

In the first five years in Indonesia, Maxim expanded the area of operation to more than 150 cities across the country. In 2026, the number of cities exceeded 400.

In the Philippines, the service launched in Cebu in January 2020. As of 2026, it operates in 20 cities. Maxim has operated in Malaysia since 2018, growing to over 70 cities; in 2025, the Minister of Transport ordered the company to cease operations for allowing vehicles to operate without valid permits, and Maxim has been appealing the order. The service is licensed to operate in all states of Malaysia. The service also operates in Cambodia (launched in Phnom Penh in 2024), Vietnam (since 2020), Laos (launched in Vientiane in 2024), and Thailand (available in Chiang Mai and Pattaya since 2022). By 2024, the number of cities served in Thailand had reached 17. The Indonesian city of Gianyar became the 1001st city in the world where Maxim works.

=== Latin America ===
Maxim launched in Brazil in 2021 and by mid-2023 was available in over 50 cities. In Argentina, the service operates in Mendoza, La Rioja and Catamarca. Maxim entered Peru in 2020, initially focusing on provincial cities. Maxim launched in Colombia in 2020 and expanded to six cities; motorcycle rides were introduced in 2022.

=== Central Asia ===
In Azerbaijan, Maxim has been operating since 2017, starting in Baku and expanding to six cities. Maxim started working in Kazakhstan in 2014. By March 2018, the company was operating in 11 cities: Aktobe, Almaty, Astana, Karaganda, Kokshetau, Kostanay, Petropavlovsk, Semey, Temirtau, Uralsk, Ust-Kamenogorsk. As of 2022, residents and visitors in 20 cities across the country were able to use the company's services.

The business in Tajikistan began in 2017. In September 2018, the company began operating in the capital of the country, Dushanbe, where it also opened a contact center.

=== South Africa ===
By 2025, Maxim had expanded to 15 cities in South Africa: Cape Town, Bloemfontein, East London, Emalahleni, George, Gqerberha (Port Elizabeth), Kimberley, Mbombela, Middelburg, Mossel Bay, Newcastle, Pietermaritzburg, Polokwane, and other cities.
