= WASO (AM) =

Covington, Louisiana; United States
- Broadcast area: New Orleans metropolitan area
- Frequency: 730 kHz
- Branding: WASO AM 730

Programming
- Format: News/Talk

Ownership
- Owner: MDCJ, LLC

History
- Former call signs: WARB
- Call sign meaning: Where America Speaks Out

Technical information
- Facility ID: 1312
- Class: D
- Power: 250 watts (day); 25 watts (night)
- Transmitter coordinates: 30°29′37″N 90°08′37″W

Links
- Website: hottalkradio.com

WASO (730 AM) was an American radio station that served the New Orleans, Louisiana, area. The station was assigned the WASO call letters by the Federal Communications Commission on August 18, 1992.

== History ==
WASO, whose call letters stood for "Where America Speaks Out", was originally WARB, owned by the Blossman family who owned a local bank (the call letters stood for Alfred R. Blossman.) The station was sold in 1992 to Robert Namer, a conservative talk show host who launched the station after he left WSLA AM.

In 2005, the FCC transferred control of the license to the receiver liquidating the assets of America First Communications to satisfy a court judgement and the station went silent pending its possible sale.

The judgement was the result of non-payment of a $3 million award from a lawsuit brought and won by the Federal Trade Commission in 1991. The FTC brought the action and won at trial claiming "Namer and NBC [National Business Consultants] made numerous material misrepresentations to potential franchisees, made unsupported earnings claims, failed to provide required supporting documentation, and failed to make required disclosures.". That judgment was appealed and affirmed by the Fifth Circuit US Appeals Court in 2004.

On September 2, 2005 WASO was bought back on the air through executive emergency powers by the president of St. Tammany Parish, Kevin Davis, to assist in getting information and relaying messages to its residents and services in the wake of Hurricane Katrina.

On September 1, 2006, the FCC granted permission to the receiver for the station to resume broadcasting under the terms of the existing license.

As of October 25, 2007, the license for the station was transferred to MCDJ, LLC, a limited liability corporation with 4 individuals each owning a 25% share. The owners of MDJC, LLC also own a 40% stake in radio station WGSO in New Orleans. The purchase price was $578,100.

As of August 3, 2009, the station license was cancelled by the FCC, and the station is no longer listed on their website.
