= Babo Airport =

Airport in Teluk Bintuni, Indonesia

Babo Airport Bandar Udara Babo
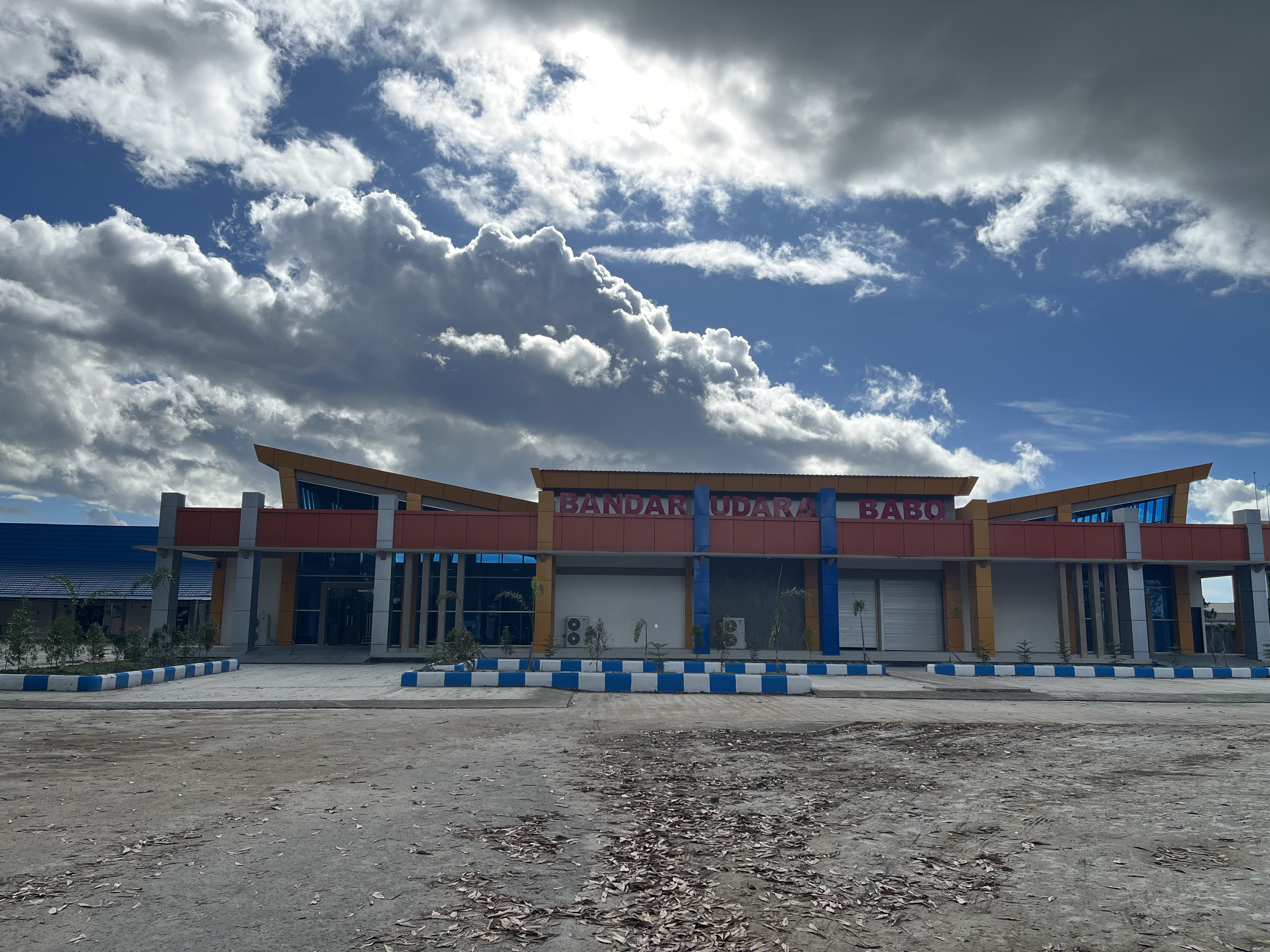
- IATA: BXB; ICAO: WASO

Summary
- Airport type: Public
- Owner: Government of Indonesia
- Operator: Ministry of Transportation
- Serves: Teluk Bintuni
- Location: Teluk Bintuni Regency, West Papua, Indonesia
- Time zone: WITA (UTC+08:00)
- Elevation AMSL: 10 ft / 3 m
- Coordinates: 2°33′0″S 133°25′0″E

Map
- Location in West Papua Location in Western New Guinea Location in Indonesia

Runways
Direction	Length		Surface
Direction	ft	m	Surface
02/20	3,937	1,300	Asphalt

Babo Airport (IATA: BXB, ICAO: WASO) is located in Babo, West Papua, Indonesia. The airport serves as the point of entry to the nearby Tangguh LNG Plant. Its previous runway length of 950 meters (3,120 ft) was extended to 1,300 meters (4,300 ft) in early August 2014. The airport can only accommodate aircraft such as the ATR-72 and Twin Otter.

The Tangguh LNG plant in Teluk Bintuni Regency, West Papua, began production in 2009. Since a few years earlier, various infrastructure began to be built and improved. One of them is Babo Airport, which is in Babo district. To cater to workers of the Tangguh LNG plant, the airport was reactivated and developed after years of lying dormant. The development not only consist of paving the airport runway, but also defusing no fewer than 360 active bombs scattered in the airport area left by the Dutch in the midst of the Pacific War during World War II. The defusing of the bombs, which was assisted by the Indonesian Army Combat Engineers, took place in 2002. Once completed, the airport runway which originally had a gravel surface was paved by BP Berau, a subsidiary of BP. Having a runway along 1,300 meters, Babo Airport is now under the management of the Ministry of Transportation.

== Airlines and destinations ==
Airlines	Destinations
Susi Air	Fakfak, Manokwari
Travira Air	Charter: Sorong, Biak
Wings Air	Sorong
